= Index of ancient Egypt–related articles =

This page list topics related to ancient Egypt.

== 0–9 ==
- 1770 (mummy)
- 317a and 317b mummies
- 4.2-kiloyear event

== A ==
- A-bt
- A-Group culture
- A. F. Shore
- A. J. Arkell
- Aa (architect)
- Aabeni (high steward)
- Aamu
- Aani
- Aaru
- Aat (queen)
- Aati
- Abadiyeh, Egypt
- Abar (queen)
- Abaset
- Abbott Papyrus
- Abd al-Latif al-Baghdadi
- Abdi-Ashirta
- Abdi-Heba
- Abdi-Riša
- Abeer Eladany
- Abetni
- Abimilki
- Abtu
- Abu Ballas
- Abu Gorab
- Abu Mena
- Abu Rawash
- Abu Simbel
- Abusir (Lake Mariout)
- Abusir Bana
- Abusir Papyri
- Abusir
- Abu Tesht
- Abutiu
- Abydos, Egypt
- Abydos boats
- Abydos Dynasty
- Abydos graffiti
- Abydos King List (Ramesses II)
- Abydos King List
- Achaemenes (satrap)
- Achaemenid coinage
- Achaemenid Empire
- Achillas
- Actian dekanaia
- Adam Łukaszewicz
- Adda-danu
- Addaya
- Adder stone
- Adikhalamani
- Adler Papyri
- Adolf Erman
- Adolphe Reinach
- Adriaan de Buck
- Adze-on-block (hieroglyph)
- Adze
- Aegyptiaca
- Aegyptus
- Aelius Gallus
- Aetia (Callimachus)
- Agathodaemon
- Agilkia Island
- Agnès Cabrol
- Ahanakht I
- Ahaneith
- Ahhotep II
- Ahhotep I
- Ahmed Fakhry
- Ahmed Kamal (Egyptologist)
- Ahmed Moussa (Egyptologist)
- Ahmed Osman (author)
- Ahmes
- Ahmose (18th dynasty)
- Ahmose (princess)
- Ahmose (queen)
- Ahmose, son of Ebana
- Ahmose-ankh
- Ahmose-Henutemipet
- Ahmose-Henuttamehu
- Ahmose-Meritamon (17th dynasty)
- Ahmose-Meritamun
- Ahmose-Nebetta
- Ahmose-Nefertari
- Ahmose-Sitamun
- Ahmose-Sitkamose
- Ahmose called Si-Tayit
- Ahmose called Turo
- Ahmose Inhapy
- Ahmose I
- Ahmose Sapair
- Aidan Dodson
- Aker (deity)
- Akhekh
- Akhenaten, Dweller in Truth
- Akhenaten
- Akhet (hieroglyph)
- Akhetaa
- Akhethetep (Louvre mastaba)
- Akhethetep (overseer of the great house)
- Akhethetep (scribe)
- Akhethetep (son of Ptahhotep)
- Akhethetep Hemi
- Akhmim wooden tablets
- Akhmim
- Akhnaten (opera)
- Akhnaton (play)
- Akhraten
- Akhty (deity)
- Akizzi
- Akoris, Egypt
- Aktisanes
- Al-Meragh
- Al-Walid ibn Mus'ab
- Alabastron
- Alan F. Alford
- Alan Gardiner
- Alan Rowe (archaeologist)
- Alara of Kush
- Alashiya
- Albert Lythgoe
- Alcetas
- Alchemy
- Alec Naylor Dakin
- Aleksandr Kotseyovsky
- Alessandra Nibbi
- Alessandro Barsanti
- Alessia Amenta
- Alexander Badawy
- Alexander Balas
- Alexander Helios
- Alexander Henry Rhind
- Alexander I of Epirus
- Alexander IV of Macedon
- Alexander the Great
- Alexandre Moret
- Alexandre Varille
- Alexandrian Pleiad
- Alexandrian school
- Alexandria School of Medicine
- Alexandria
- Alfred Lucas (chemist)
- Alfred Wiedemann
- Alice Grenfell
- Alice Stevenson
- Alicia Daneri
- Ali Suefi
- Alodia
- Alphonse Lami
- Am-heh
- Amandine Marshall
- Amaniastabarqa
- Amanibakhi
- Amanikhabale
- Amanikhalika
- Amanikhareqerem
- Amanikhatashan
- Amanimalel
- Amaninatakilebte
- Amanineteyerike
- Amanipilade
- Amanirenas
- Amanishakheto
- Amanislo
- Amanitaraqide
- Amanitenmemide
- Amanitore
- Amanmašša
- Amantekha
- Amara, Nubia
- Amarna art
- Amarna letter EA 1
- Amarna letter EA 2
- Amarna letter EA 3
- Amarna letter EA 4
- Amarna letter EA 5
- Amarna letter EA 6
- Amarna letter EA 7
- Amarna letter EA 8
- Amarna letter EA 9
- Amarna letter EA 10
- Amarna letter EA 11
- Amarna letter EA 12
- Amarna letter EA 15
- Amarna letter EA 19
- Amarna letter EA 23
- Amarna letter EA 26
- Amarna letter EA 27
- Amarna letter EA 35
- Amarna letter EA 38
- Amarna letter EA 39
- Amarna letter EA 59
- Amarna letter EA 75
- Amarna letter EA 86
- Amarna letter EA 100
- Amarna letter EA 144
- Amarna letter EA 147
- Amarna letter EA 149
- Amarna letter EA 153
- Amarna letter EA 156
- Amarna letter EA 158
- Amarna letter EA 161
- Amarna letter EA 170
- Amarna letter EA 205
- Amarna letter EA 223
- Amarna letter EA 245
- Amarna letter EA 248
- Amarna letter EA 252
- Amarna letter EA 254
- Amarna letter EA 256
- Amarna letter EA 270
- Amarna letter EA 271
- Amarna letter EA 282
- Amarna letter EA 286
- Amarna letter EA 287
- Amarna letter EA 288
- Amarna letter EA 289
- Amarna letter EA 290
- Amarna letter EA 299
- Amarna letter EA 323
- Amarna letter EA 325
- Amarna letter EA 362
- Amarna letter EA 364
- Amarna letter EA 365
- Amarna letter EA 366
- Amarna letter EA 367
- Amarna letter EA 369
- Amarna letters localities and rulers
- Amarna letters
- Amarna Period
- Amarna Princess
- Amarna Royal Tombs Project
- Amarna succession
- Amarna Tomb 1
- Amarna Tomb 3
- Amarna Tomb 5
- Amarna Tomb 7
- Amarna
- Amasis II
- Amaymon
- Amduat
- Amelia Edwards
- Amenemhat (chief of Teh-khet)
- Amenemhat (High Priest of Amun)
- Amenemhat (nomarch, 16th nome)
- Amenemhat (son of Thutmose III)
- Amenemhatankh (vizier)
- Amenemhatankh
- Amenemhat III
- Amenemhat II
- Amenemhat IV
- Amenemhat I
- Amenemhat VI
- Amenemipet called Pairy
- Amenemnisu
- Amenemope (author)
- Amenemope (pharaoh)
- Amenemopet (prince)
- Amenemopet (princess)
- Amenemopet (Viceroy of Kush)
- Amenherkhepshef
- Amenhotep (18th dynasty High Priest of Amun)
- Amenhotep (20th dynasty High Priest of Amun)
- Amenhotep (high steward)
- Amenhotep (Huy)
- Amenhotep (official)
- Amenhotep (prince)
- Amenhotep (treasurer)
- Amenhotep (Viceroy of Kush)
- Amenhotep, son of Hapu
- Amenhotep-Huy
- Amenhotep called Huy
- Amenhotep III
- Amenhotep II
- Amenhotep I
- Amenia (wife of Horemheb)
- Amenirdis II
- Amenirdis I
- Amenmesse
- Amenmose (noble)
- Amenmose (prince)
- Amenmose (TT42)
- Amenmose (vizier)
- Amenmose, son of Pendjerty
- Ameny (general)
- Ameny (high steward)
- Ameny (queen)
- Ameny (vizier under Amenemhat II)
- Ameny (vizier under Amenemhat III)
- Ameny Qemau
- Amenyseneb
- Amesemi
- Amestris
- Amethu called Ahmose
- Amice Calverley
- Amka (official)
- Ammeris
- Amminapes
- Ammit
- Ammu Aahotepre
- Ammunira
- Amqu
- Amu (pharaoh)
- Amu-Aa
- Amun-Her-Khepesh-Ef (son of Senusret III)
- Amun-her-khepeshef (20th dynasty)
- Amun-her-khepeshef
- Amunet
- Amun
- Amyntas (son of Andromenes)
- Amyrtaeus
- Anabasis of Alexander
- Analmaye
- Anat-her
- Anat
- Ancient Egypt (magazine)
- Ancient Egyptian afterlife beliefs
- Ancient Egyptian agriculture
- Ancient Egyptian anatomical studies
- Ancient Egyptian architecture
- Ancient Egyptian calendar
- Ancient Egyptian conception of the soul
- Ancient Egyptian creation myths
- Ancient Egyptian cuisine
- Ancient Egyptian deities
- Ancient Egyptian flint jewelry
- Ancient Egyptian funerary practices
- Ancient Egyptian funerary texts
- Ancient Egyptian Hieroglyphs: A Practical Guide
- Ancient Egyptian literature
- Ancient Egyptian mathematics
- Ancient Egyptian medicine
- Ancient Egyptian multiplication
- Ancient Egyptian navy
- Ancient Egyptian offering formula
- Ancient Egyptian offerings
- Ancient Egyptian philosophy
- Ancient Egyptian pottery
- Ancient Egyptian race controversy
- Ancient Egyptian religion
- Ancient Egyptian retainer sacrifices
- Ancient Egyptian royal ships
- Ancient Egyptian royal titulary
- Ancient Egyptian technology
- Ancient Egyptian trade
- Ancient Egyptian units of measurement
- Ancient Egypt in the Western imagination
- Ancient Egypt
- Ancient Near East
- Ancient Records of Egypt
- Ancient technology
- Andjety
- Andrea G. McDowell
- Andrzej Niwiński
- André Pochan
- Anedjib
- Anen
- Anhotep
- Anhurmose
- Aniba (Nubia)
- Animal mummy
- Ankh-ef-en-Khonsu i
- Ankhefensekhmet
- Ankhesenamun
- Ankhesenpaaten Tasherit
- Ankhesenpepi III
- Ankhesenpepi II
- Ankhesenpepi IV
- Ankhesenpepi I
- Ankhhaf
- Ankhhor
- Ankhkherednefer
- Ankhmare
- Ankhnesneferibre
- Ankhtifi
- Ankhu
- Ankh wedja seneb
- Ankhwennefer (pharaoh)
- Ankhwennefer (vizier)
- Ankh
- Anlamani
- Anna Anderson Morton
- Annals of Amenemhat II
- Annals of Thutmose III
- Anne Boud'hors
- Ann Rosalie David
- Anonymous Tombs in Amarna
- Anput
- Anra scarab
- Anson Rainey
- Anthony Charles Harris
- Anthylla
- Antigonus I Monophthalmus
- Antinoöpolis
- Antiochus III the Great
- Antiochus IV Epiphanes
- Antiochus VII Sidetes
- Antipater
- Antirhodos
- Antiu
- Antoni Józef Śmieszek
- Antonio Lebolo
- Antonio Loprieno
- Anubis Shrine
- Anubis
- Anuketemheb
- Anuket
- Anysis
- Apedemak
- 'Apepi
- Apepi
- Aperanat
- Aperel
- Apesh
- Aphroditopolite Nome
- ʿApiru
- Apis (city)
- Apis (deity)
- Apis Papyrus
- Apollonius (dioiketes)
- Apollonopolis Parva (Hypselis)
- Apollonos Hydreium
- Apophis
- Apries
- Apshait
- Apt (Egyptian)
- Aqen
- Ar (cuneiform)
- Arakamani
- Aramatle-qo
- Archelaus (high priest of Comana Cappadocia)
- Architecture of Sudan
- Archon of Pella
- Arensnuphis
- Aretalogy
- Arghul
- Arikhankharer
- Aristander
- Arm, cubit symbol (hieroglyph)
- Armant, Egypt
- Arms-in-embrace (hieroglyph)
- Arnekhamani
- Arnouphis
- Arqamani
- Arqa
- Arsames (satrap of Egypt)
- Arsawuya
- Arses of Persia
- Arsinoe (Gulf of Suez)
- Arsinoe III
- Arsinoe II
- Arsinoe IV
- Arsinoe I
- Arsinoe of Macedon
- Artakama
- Artaxerxes III
- Artaxerxes II
- Artaxerxes I
- Arthur Callender
- Arthur Cruttenden Mace
- Arthur Surridge Hunt
- Arthur Weigall
- Artist's Sketch of Pharaoh Spearing a Lion
- Art of ancient Egypt
- Arty (queen)
- Aryamani
- Aryandes
- Asander
- Ash (deity)
- Ashakhet II
- Ashakhet I
- Ashayet
- Ashurbanipal
- Ashur-uballit I
- Asiya
- Askut
- Aspelta
- Assessors of Maat
- Assyrian conquest of Egypt
- Astarte and the Insatiable Sea
- Astarte
- Astronomical ceiling of Senenmut's Tomb
- Aswan
- Asyut
- Atakhebasken
- Atef
- Atenism
- Aten
- Athanasius Kircher
- Athenion (general)
- Athribis (Upper Egypt)
- Athribis Project
- Athribis
- Atlanersa
- Attalus (son of Andromenes)
- Atum
- August Eisenlohr
- Auguste Mariette
- Aulus Avilius Flaccus
- Aurélia Masson-Berghoff
- Autobiography of Ahmose Pen-Nekhebet
- Autobiography of Harkhuf
- Autobiography of Weni
- Autophradates
- Avaris
- Avenue of Sphinxes
- Ay (pharaoh)
- Aya (queen)
- Aylward M. Blackman
- Ayyab
- Aziru

== B ==
- B (hieroglyph)
- Ba (pharaoh)
- Ba-Pef
- Baalat Gebal
- Baal
- Babaef II
- Babi (mythology)
- Babylon Fortress
- Badarian culture
- Bahr Yussef
- Baka (prince)
- Bakenhori
- Bakenkhonsu
- Bakenranef
- Bakenrenef (vizier)
- Baketmut
- Baketwernel
- Balakros
- Balanos oil
- Ballana
- Banebdjedet
- Banishment Stela
- Baqet III
- Baqet II
- Baqet I
- Barbara Adams (Egyptologist)
- Barbara Mertz
- Barbara Ruszczyc
- Barbary lion
- Bardiya
- Barga (kingdom)
- Baris (ship)
- Baris, Egypt
- Barry Kemp (Egyptologist)
- Barsine
- Baskakeren
- Bassam el-Shammaa
- Bastet
- Bat (goddess)
- Bata (god)
- Battiscombe Gunn
- Battlefield Palette
- Battle of Actium
- Battle of Alexandria (30 BC)
- Battle of Andros (246 BC)
- Battle of Bitter Lakes
- Battle of Carchemish
- Battle of Cos
- Battle of Djahy
- Battle of Ephesus (ca. 258 BC)
- Battle of Hamath
- Battle of Kadesh
- Battle of Megiddo (15th century BC)
- Battle of Megiddo (609 BC)
- Battle of Migdol (601 BC)
- Battle of Panium
- Battle of Pelusium (373 BC)
- Battle of Pelusium
- Battle of Perire
- Battle of Quramati
- Battle of Raphia
- Battle of Salamis (306 BC)
- Battle of the Delta
- Battle of the Nile (47 BC)
- Battle of the Oenoparus
- Battle of Zephath
- Baufra
- Bawit
- Bay (chancellor)
- Béatrix Midant-Reynes
- Beautiful Festival of the Valley
- Beauty and cosmetics in ancient Egypt
- Bebi (vizier)
- Bebiankh
- Bebnum
- Bee (heraldry)
- Bee (hieroglyph)
- Behbeit El Hagar
- Behenu
- Bek (sculptor)
- Beketamun
- Beketaten
- Bembine Tablet
- Ben-Azen
- Benben
- Bendix Ebbell
- Benerib
- Beni Hasan funerary boat
- Beni Hasan
- Bennu heron
- Bennu
- Bent Pyramid
- Bentresh stela
- Berenice III
- Berenice II
- Berenice IV
- Berenice I
- Berenice Panchrysos
- Berenice Syra
- Berenice Troglodytica
- Berlin Green Head
- Berlin Papyrus 6619
- Bernadette Menu
- Bernard Bruyère
- Bernardino Drovetti
- Bernard Mathieu
- Bernard Pyne Grenfell
- Bertha Porter
- Bes
- Betrest
- Betsy Bryan
- Bigeh
- Bikheris
- Bill Field
- Bintanath
- Biridašwa
- Biridiya
- Bir Kiseiba
- Birth tusk
- Biryawaza
- Black Pyramid
- Blemmyes
- Block statue
- Bob Brier
- Bocchoris vase
- Bone-with-meat (hieroglyph)
- Bonn Egyptian Museum
- Book of Caverns
- Book of Gates
- Book of Nut
- Book of Sothis
- Book of the Dead (Art Institute of Chicago)
- Book of the Dead of Amen-em-hat
- Book of the Dead of Nehem-es-Rataui
- Book of the Dead of Qenna
- Book of the Dead
- Book of the Earth
- Book of the Faiyum
- Book of the Heavenly Cow
- Book of Thoth
- Book of Traversing Eternity
- Books of Breathing
- Boris de Rachewiltz
- Boris Turayev
- Boston Green Head
- Botanical garden of Thutmosis III
- Boundary Stelae of Akhenaten
- Bowstring (hieroglyph)
- Boyo Ockinga
- Branch (hieroglyph)
- Brazier (hieroglyph)
- Breathing Permit of Hôr
- British Museum Department of Ancient Egypt and Sudan
- British school of diffusionism
- Bronze Sphinx of Thutmose III
- Brooklyn Medical Papyrus
- Brugsch Papyrus
- Bubasteum
- Bubastis
- Bubastite Portal
- Bucheum
- Buchis
- Buhen
- Building the Great Pyramid
- Bull (ka hieroglyph)
- Bulletin de l'Institut Français d'Archéologie Orientale
- Bull Palette
- Bunefer
- Bureau of Correspondence of Pharaoh
- Buried Pyramid
- Burna-Buriash II
- Busiris (Aphroditopolis)
- Bust of Amenemhat V
- Bust of Ankhhaf
- Bust of Cleopatra
- Butana
- Buto

== C ==
- C-Group culture
- C. Blankenberg-van Delden
- C. Jouco Bleeker
- C. Wilfred Griggs
- Caesareum of Alexandria
- Caesarion
- Calas (general)
- Callicrates of Samos
- Callisthenes
- Cambyses II
- Campbell Cowan Edgar
- Campsite Memorial of Augustus
- Canopic chest
- Canopic jar
- Canopus, Egypt
- Caphtor
- Caranus (hetairos)
- Carian War
- Carlos Blanco (writer)
- Carnarvon Tablet
- Carob (hieroglyph)
- Caroline Ransom Williams
- Cartonnage
- Cartouche
- Casluhim
- Cataracts of the Nile
- Cats in ancient Egypt
- Cattle count
- Cattle in religion and mythology
- Cavern deities of the underworld
- Cecil Mallaby Firth
- Celestial Ferryman
- Cemetery GIS
- Central Field, Giza
- Chaeremon of Alexandria
- Chair of Reniseneb
- Champollion: A Scribe for Egypt
- Champollion Museum (Vif)
- Chapelle Rouge
- Chares of Mytilene
- Chariotry in ancient Egypt
- Charles Allberry
- Charles Bonnet (archeologist)
- Charles Chipiez
- Charles Edward Moldenke
- Charles Edwin Wilbour
- Charles Kuentz (Egyptologist)
- Charles Lenormant
- Charles Wycliffe Goodwin
- Charlotte Booth
- Charmion (servant to Cleopatra)
- Cheikh Anta Diop
- Chester Beatty Medical Papyrus
- Chester Beatty Papyri
- Child (hieroglyph)
- Chremonidean War
- Chremonides
- Chris Bennett (egyptologist)
- Chris Naunton
- Christian Charles Josias von Bunsen
- Christiane Desroches Noblecourt
- Christiane Ziegler
- Christian Greco
- Christian Jacq
- Christian Leitz
- Christian Loeben
- Christina Riggs
- Christine El Mahdy
- Chronological synchronism
- Claire Lalouette
- Claude-Étienne Savary
- Claude Obsomer
- Claude Rilly
- Claude Sicard
- Claude Traunecker
- Claude Vandersleyen
- Claudius Labib
- Clay tablet
- Cleitarchus
- Cleomenes of Naucratis
- Cleopatra's Daughter (Draycott book)
- Cleopatra's Daughter (Roller book)
- Cleopatra's Needle (New York City)
- Cleopatra's Needle, London
- Cleopatra (1963 film)
- Cleopatra III
- Cleopatra II
- Cleopatra I Syra
- Cleopatra IV
- Cleopatra Selene II
- Cleopatra Selene of Syria
- Cleopatra Thea
- Cleopatra VI
- Cleopatra V
- Cleopatra
- Clergy of ancient Egypt
- Cliff tomb of Hatshepsut
- Clysma
- Coenus (general)
- Coffin of Nedjemankh
- Coffin Texts
- Coiled sewn sandals
- Collection of funerary steles in the National Museum of Brazil
- Colleen Darnell
- Colossal quartzite statue of Amenhotep III
- Colossal red granite statue of Amenhotep III
- Colossal statue of Amenhotep III and Tiye
- Colossal Statues of Akhenaten at East Karnak
- Colossi of Memnon
- Commemorative scarabs of Amenhotep III
- Commission des Sciences et des Arts
- Complaints of Khakheperraseneb
- Conradus Leemans
- Conservation and restoration of papyrus
- Conspiracies in ancient Egypt
- Construction of the Egyptian pyramids
- Coptic language
- Coptic Orthodox Church
- Coptos Decrees
- Coptos Decree
- Coregency Stela
- Corinna Rossi
- Cornelius Gallus
- Corn mummy
- Coronation of the pharaoh
- Cosmetic palette in the form of a Nile tortoise
- Cosmetic palette
- Cosmetic Spoon: Young Girl Swimming
- Count Riamo d'Hulst
- Craterus
- Crocodile (pharaoh)
- Crocus (general)
- Crook-staff (Luwian hieroglyph)
- Crook and flail
- Cross-ndj (hieroglyph)
- Crown of justification
- Crowns of Egypt
- Cultural tourism in Egypt
- Curse of the pharaohs
- Cursive hieroglyphs
- Cusae
- Customs of ancient Egypt
- Cynane
- Cynocephaly
- Cynopolis
- Cyril Aldred
- Cyrus the Great
- Cyrus the Younger

== D ==
- Dabenarti
- Dagi (Ancient Egyptian official)
- Dagi
- Dahshur boats
- Dahshur
- Dakhamunzu
- Damanhur
- Dance in ancient Egypt
- Danielle Bonneau
- Daniel Polz
- Danijela Stefanović
- Dar al-Manasir
- Darb El Arba'īn
- Darius III
- Darius II
- Darius the Great
- David Jacob van Lennep
- David Lorton
- David O'Connor (Egyptologist)
- David P. Silverman
- David Randall-MacIver
- David Roberts (painter)
- Death of Cleopatra
- Debeira
- Deben (unit)
- Decan
- Decipherment of ancient Egyptian scripts
- Decline of ancient Egyptian religion
- Decree of Canopus
- Decree of Nectanebo I
- Dedumose II
- Dedumose I
- Dedun
- Dedusobek Bebi
- Deir el-Bahari
- Deir el-Balah sarcophagi
- Deir el-Ballas
- Deir el-Gabrawi
- Deir el-Medina strikes
- Deir el-Medina
- Deir el-Roumi
- Deir El Bersha
- Delia Pemberton
- Demetrius II Nicator
- Demotic Chronicle
- Demotic Egyptian language
- Demotic Egyptian script
- Den (pharaoh)
- Dendera light
- Dendera temple complex
- Dendera zodiac
- Den seal impressions
- Denyen
- Department of Egyptian Antiquities of the Louvre
- Depiction of Hatshepsut's birth and coronation
- Description de l'Égypte
- Deshret
- Determinative
- Detlef Franke
- Diadochi
- Diary of Merer
- Didia
- Dieter Arnold
- Ding Jinhao engraving scandal
- Dinocrates
- Dionysus-Osiris
- Disability in Ancient Egypt
- Discovery of the tomb of Tutankhamun
- Dispute Between a Man and His Ba
- Divine Adoratrice of Amun
- Djadjaemankh
- Djahy
- Djaty
- Djau
- Djedankhre Montemsaf
- Djedefhor
- Djedefre
- Djedi Project
- Djediufankh
- Djedi
- Djedkare Isesi
- Djedkare Shemai
- Djedkheperew
- Djedkhonsuefankh
- Djedmaatesankh
- Djedptahiufankh
- Djed
- Djefaihapi
- Djefatnebti
- Djehutihotep
- Djehuty (general)
- Djehuty (High Priest of Amun)
- Djehuty (overseer of the treasury)
- Djehutyemhat
- Djehutyhotep (chief of Teh-khet)
- Djehutynakht (10A)
- Djehutynakht VI
- Djer
- Djeseretnebti
- Djet
- Djoser
- Djsr (arm with powerstick)
- Dmitry Prusakov
- Dominic Montserrat
- Donald B. Redford
- Donald P. Ryan
- Donations of Alexandria
- Dorothea Arnold
- Dorothy Eady
- Dotawo
- Double Falcon
- Double Pyramid
- Dows Dunham
- Dra' Abu el-Naga
- Dramatic Ramesseum Papyrus
- Dream Stele
- Drusilla (descendant of Cleopatra)
- DU-Teššup of Amurru
- Duaenhor
- Duaenre
- Duatentopet
- Duathathor-Henuttawy
- Duat
- Dunbar Isidore Heath
- Dung beetle
- Dunqul Oasis
- Dwarfs and pygmies in ancient Egypt
- Dynastic race theory
- Dynasties of ancient Egypt
- Dynasty 0

== E ==
- E. A. Wallis Budge
- E. E. Rehmus
- E. Harold Jones
- Early Dynastic Period of Egypt
- Early life of Cleopatra
- Eberhard Otto (Egyptologist)
- Ebers Papyrus
- Echecrates of Thessaly
- Edda Bresciani
- Edfu-Project
- Edfu South pyramid
- Edfu
- Edme-François Jomard
- Édouard de Villiers du Terrage
- Édouard Dulaurier
- Édouard Empain
- Édouard Naville
- Eduardo Toda y Güell
- Edward Bleiberg
- Edward Chaney
- Edward F. Wente
- Edward Hincks
- Edward R. Ayrton
- Edward Y. McCauley
- Edwin C. Brock
- Edwin Smith (Egyptologist)
- Edwin Smith Papyrus
- Egg (hieroglyph)
- Egypt
- Egypt (TV series)
- Egypt Exploration Society
- Egyptian-style theatre
- Egyptian algebra
- Egyptian astronomy
- Egyptian biliteral signs
- Egyptian blue
- Egyptian chronology
- Egyptian Collection of the Hermitage Museum
- Egyptian faience
- Egyptian finger and toe stall
- Egyptian fraction
- Egyptian geometry
- Egyptian gold stater
- Egyptian Grammar (book)
- Egyptian Greeks
- Egyptian hieroglyphs
- Egyptian Invasion of Kerma
- Egyptian Journeys with Dan Cruickshank
- Egyptian language
- Egyptian Mathematical Leather Roll
- Egyptian medical papyri
- Egyptian Museum (Milan)
- Egyptian Museum of Berlin
- Egyptian Museum
- Egyptian mythology
- Egyptian numerals
- Egyptian obelisks
- Egyptian pool
- Egyptian pyramids
- Egyptian Revival architecture in the British Isles
- Egyptian Revival architecture
- Egyptian sun temple
- Egyptian temple
- Egyptian triliteral signs
- Egyptian–Hittite peace treaty
- Egyptology Scotland
- Egyptology
- Egyptomania in the United States
- Eighteenth Dynasty of Egypt family tree
- Eighteenth Dynasty of Egypt
- Eighth Dynasty of Egypt
- El-Amra clay model of cattle
- El-Amrah, Egypt
- El-Assasif
- El-Gabal el-Ahmar
- El-Hobagi
- El-Khokha
- El-Kurru
- El-Tarif
- El-Tigani el-Mahi
- El Araba El Madfuna
- El Badari, Egypt
- Elbo
- Elephant (pharaoh)
- Elephantine papyri and ostraca
- Elephantine
- Eleventh Dynasty of Egypt family tree
- Eleventh Dynasty of Egypt
- El Hawawish
- El Hiba
- Elinor Mullett Husselman
- Elisabeth R. O'Connell
- Elise Jenny Baumgartel
- Elizabeth Frood
- Elizabeth Thomas (Egyptologist)
- Elkab
- El Lahun
- El Mo'alla
- El Qattah
- El Qurn
- El Salamuni
- El Sheikh Sa'id
- Embalming cache
- Emblem of the East
- Emblem of the West
- Émile Amélineau
- Émile Baraize
- Émile Brugsch
- Émile Chassinat
- Émile Prisse d'Avennes
- Emily Teeter
- Emmanuel de Rougé
- Endaruta
- Enišasi
- Ennead
- Epaphus
- Epip
- Eratosthenes
- Ergamenes
- Éric Aubourg
- Eric H. Cline
- Erigyius
- Erik Hornung
- Erman Papyrus
- Ermenegildo Pistelli
- Ernesto Schiaparelli
- Esarhaddon
- Esna
- Essai sur les hiéroglyphes des Égyptiens
- Etakkama
- Ethnicity of Cleopatra
- Étienne Drioton
- Eugene Cruz-Uribe
- Eugène Grébaut
- Eugène Lefébure
- Eugène Revillout
- Eumenes
- Eurydice of Egypt
- Evaristo Breccia
- Ewa Wipszycka
- Excerebration
- Execration texts
- Exhibitions of artifacts from the tomb of Tutankhamun
- Exploration of the Valley of the Kings
- Eye of Horus
- Eye of Ra

== F ==
- Face (hieroglyph)
- Fadrus
- Fag el-Gamous
- Faiyum
- Falcon
- Fall of Ashdod
- False door
- Family tree of the Twenty-first, Twenty-second, and Twenty-third Dynasties of Egypt
- Famine Stela
- Fan-bearer on the Right Side of the King
- Faras Cathedral
- Faras
- Fayum mummy portraits
- Fayza Haikal
- Fernand Bisson de La Roque
- Festival Hall of Thutmose III
- Festival Songs of Isis and Nephthys
- Fifteenth Dynasty of Egypt
- Fifth Dynasty of Egypt
- Filiative nomen
- Finger Snail
- First Achaemenid conquest of Egypt
- First Dynasty of Egypt family tree
- First Dynasty of Egypt
- First Intermediate Period of Egypt
- Fish (pharaoh)
- Fish cosmetic palette
- Flail (tool)
- Flaxman Charles John Spurrell
- Flinders Petrie
- Flooding of the Nile
- Foreign contacts of ancient Egypt
- Foreleg of ox
- Foundation deposit
- Four sons of Horus
- Fourteenth Dynasty of Egypt
- Fourth Dynasty of Egypt family tree
- Fourth Dynasty of Egypt
- Francesco Salvolini
- Francis Llewellyn Griffith
- Frank J. Yurco
- Frank Shaver Allen
- František Lexa
- Franz Joseph Lauth
- François Chabas
- François Daumas
- François de Bovet
- Françoise Dunand
- François Michel de Rozière
- Fraser Tombs
- Freda Hansard
- Frederick W. Green (Egyptologist)
- French invasion of Egypt and Syria
- Friedrich Preisigke
- Friedrich Wilhelm von Bissing
- Fritz Hintze
- Functions of the Pharaoh
- Funerary cone
- Funerary cult

== G ==
- Gabal El Haridi
- Gabiniani
- Gaius Avidius Heliodorus
- Gaius Petronius
- Gala Abu Ahmed
- Game piece (hieroglyph)
- Ganymedes (eunuch)
- Gardens of ancient Egypt
- Gardiner's sign list
- Gaston Maspero
- Gate deities of the underworld
- Gates to the Temple of Medamud
- Gautseshen
- Gayer-Anderson cat
- Gaza City
- Gebel Adda
- Gebelein predynastic mummies
- Gebelein
- Gebel el-Arak Knife
- Gebel el-Silsila
- Gebu (high steward)
- Geb
- Gegi
- Gemenefhorbak
- Gemenefkhonsbak
- Gemniemhat
- Genealogy of Ankhefensekhmet
- Genetic history of Egypt
- Gengen-Wer
- Geoffrey Thorndike Martin
- George Andrew Reisner
- Georg Ebers
- George Francis Hardy
- George Gliddon
- George Hart (Egyptologist)
- George Herbert, 5th Earl of Carnarvon
- Georges Aaron Bénédite
- Georges Daressy
- Georges Foucart
- Georges Goyon
- Georges Legrain
- George Willoughby Fraser
- Georgios II of Makuria
- Georgios I of Makuria
- Georg Möller
- Georg Steindorff
- Georg Zoëga
- Gerald Avery Wainwright
- Geraldine Harris
- Gertrud Thausing
- Gianluca Miniaci
- Gihane Zaki
- Gilukhipa
- Giovanni Battista Caviglia
- Giovanni Belzoni
- Giovanni Kminek-Szedlo
- Girolamo Segato
- Gisr el-Mudir
- Giulio Farina
- Giuseppe Ferlini
- Giza East Field
- Giza Plateau
- Giza pyramid complex
- Giza Solar boat museum
- Giza West Field
- Giza writing board
- Glasgow Chronology
- Glossary of ancient Egypt artifacts
- Glossenkeil (Amarna letters)
- Goblet drum
- God's Wife of Amun
- God's Wife
- Gold (hieroglyph)
- Göttinger Miszellen
- Graffito of Esmet-Akhom
- Grafton Elliot Smith
- Grammaire égyptienne
- Grand Egyptian Museum
- Grape arbor (hieroglyph)
- Great Hymn to the Aten
- Great Hypostyle Hall
- Great Karnak Inscription
- Great Mendes Stela
- Great Pyramid of Giza
- Great Royal Wife
- Great Sphinx of Giza
- Great Sphinx of Tanis
- Great Temple of the Aten
- Great Theban Revolt
- Greco-Persian Wars
- Greek Magical Papyri
- Greenfield Papyrus
- Greeting-gift (Shulmani)
- Guenter B. Risse
- Guillemette Andreu
- Gun Björkman
- Günter Dreyer
- Gurob
- Gustave Jéquier
- Gustave Lefebvre
- Gustav Seyffarth
- Guy Brunton
- Guy Rachet
- Gwendolen Crewdson
- Gynaecopolis

== H ==
- Ha (mythology)
- Haankhef
- Haankhes
- Haapi
- Hadit
- Hafir
- Hakor
- Hall of Records
- Hamadab
- Haman (Islam)
- Hana Vymazalová
- Hand (hieroglyph)
- Hand-with-droplets (hieroglyph)
- Hand drill (hieroglyph)
- Hans-Werner Fischer-Elfert
- Hans Jakob Polotsky
- Hapi (Nile god)
- Hapuseneb
- Harageh
- Harawî
- Hare (hieroglyph)
- Haremakhet
- Harem conspiracy
- Hare nome
- Harkhebi
- Harper's Songs
- Harpocrates
- Harpoon (hieroglyph)
- Harry Burton (Egyptologist)
- Harry Smith (Egyptologist)
- Harsiese (C)
- Harsiese (High Priest of Ptah)
- Harsiese A
- Harsiese B
- Harsiesi
- Harsiotef
- Harsomtus
- Hartwig Altenmüller
- Harwa
- Hat (High Priest of Osiris)
- Hat-Hor
- Hathor (month)
- Hathorhotep
- Hathor
- Hatmehit
- Hatnub
- Hatshepsut (king's daughter)
- Hatshepsut
- Haty-a
- Hauron
- Hawara
- Head cone
- Head of Nefertem
- Hearst Expedition
- Hearst papyrus
- Heart scarab
- Hebenu
- Hedetet
- Hedjetnebu
- Hedjet
- Hedjhotep
- Hedju-Hor
- Hedwig Fechheimer
- Heh (god)
- Heinrich Karl Brugsch
- Heinrich Menu von Minutoli
- Heinz Heinen
- Heka (god)
- Hekat
- Hekenuhedjet
- Helen Jacquet-Gordon
- Helenus of Cyrene
- Helicopter hieroglyphs
- Heliopolis (ancient Egypt)
- Heliopolite Nome
- Hellenion (Naucratis)
- Hellenistic period
- Helmut Satzinger
- Helwan (cemetery)
- Hemaka
- Hemamieh
- Hemen
- Hemetre
- Hemhem crown
- Hemiunu
- Hemre Isi
- Hemsut
- Henenu (high steward)
- Henet
- Henhenet
- Henna
- Henning Franzmeier
- Henni von Halle
- Hennu
- Henqu I
- Henri Frankfort
- Henri Gauthier
- Henry Francis Herbert Thompson
- Henry George Fischer
- Henry Hall (Egyptologist)
- Henry Salt (Egyptologist)
- Henry Villiers-Stuart
- Henu (Saqqara)
- Henutmehyt
- Henutmire
- Henutsen
- Henuttaneb
- Henut Taui
- Henuttawy (19th dynasty)
- Henuttawy (priestess)
- Henuttawy (princess)
- Henuttawy C
- Henutwati
- Henut
- Hephaestion of Thebes
- Hephaestion
- Heptastadion
- Hepu (vizier)
- Heqaib III
- Heqaib
- Heqanakht Papyri
- Heqanakht
- Heqanefer
- Heqet
- Heracleion
- Heracleopolis Magna
- Herbert Eustis Winlock
- Herbert Ricke
- Herbert Walter Fairman
- Herfu
- Heribre
- Herihor
- Herit
- Hermann A. Schlögl
- Hermann Grapow
- Hermann Junker
- Hermann Ranke
- Hermanubis
- Hermes Trismegistus
- Hermine Hartleben
- Hermopolis (Butosos)
- Hermopolis (Lower Egypt)
- Hermopolis
- Herneith
- Heroninos Archive
- Herta Mohr
- Heru-ra-ha
- Herwer
- Hery-maat
- Heryshaf
- Hesat
- Hesy-Ra
- Hetepheres (princess)
- Hetepheres II
- Hetepheres I
- Hetephernebti
- Hetepi (priest)
- Hetepi
- Hetepti (king's mother)
- Hewernef
- Hieracon
- Hieracosphinx
- Hierakonpolis
- Hieratic
- Hieroglyphs Without Mystery
- High Priest of Amun
- High Priest of Osiris
- High Priest of Ptah
- High Priest of Ra
- High steward (Ancient Egypt)
- Hilary Wilson
- Hilda Petrie
- Hilde Zaloscer
- Hill-country (hieroglyph)
- Hippopotamus (hieroglyph)
- Historical names of Nubia
- History of Alexandria
- History of ancient Egypt
- History of Egypt
- History of Persian Egypt
- History of Sudan
- History of the Karnak Temple complex
- History of timekeeping devices in Egypt
- Homosexuality in ancient Egypt
- Hor (high steward)
- Hor-Aha
- Horapollo
- Hor Awibre
- Hor B
- Horbaef
- Horemheb
- Horemkhauef
- Hori (high priest)
- Hori (High Priest of Osiris)
- Hori I (High Priest of Ptah)
- Hori I (Viceroy of Kush)
- Hori II (Viceroy of Kush)
- Hori II (vizier)
- Horkherty
- Hormeni
- Hornakht (17th Dynasty)
- Hornakht
- Hornedjitef
- Horus Bird (pharaoh)
- Horus name
- Horus on the Crocodiles
- Horus Sa
- Horus
- Horwennefer
- Hotepibre
- Hotepsekhemwy
- Hotep
- Hounds and jackals
- House of Eternity (Ancient Egypt)
- House of life in Ancient Egypt
- Howard Carter
- Howard Vyse
- How to Read Egyptian Hieroglyphs
- Hrere
- Hsekiu
- Hu (mythology)
- Hu, Egypt
- Hubert-Pascal Ameilhon
- Hudjefa I
- Hudjefa
- Hugh Evelyn-White
- Hui (priestess)
- Human–animal hybrid
- Hunefer (mayor)
- Hunefer
- Huni
- Hunters Palette
- Hunting, fishing and animals in ancient Egypt
- Hurbayt
- Hussein Bassir
- Huub Pragt
- Huy (High Priest of Ptah)
- Huy (Viceroy of Kush)
- Huya (noble)
- Hydraulic empire
- Hyksos
- Hymn to the Nile
- Hypocephalus
- Hypselis

== I ==
- I. E. S. Edwards
- Iabet
- Iah (queen)
- Iah
- Ian Mathieson
- Ian Shaw (Egyptologist)
- Iaret
- Iat
- Ibi (Egyptian noble)
- Ibi (nomarch)
- Ibiaw
- Ibn Wahshiyya
- Idfa
- Idris Bell
- Idu (Ancient Egyptian official)
- Idudju-iker
- Idu II
- Idu I
- Idy
- Igai (deity)
- Ihy (vizier)
- Ihy
- Ikhemu-sek
- Ikhernofret Stela
- Ikhernofret
- Ili-Rapih
- Illustrated Hieroglyphics Handbook
- Imenmes
- Imentet
- Imhotep (pharaoh)
- Imhotep (The Mummy)
- Imhotep (vizier)
- Imhotep Museum
- Imhotep
- Imiseba
- Imiut fetish
- Impy II
- Imyremeshaw
- Inaros II
- Inaros I
- Incense burner: arm (hieroglyph)
- Incense burner: pot (hieroglyph)
- Incest in ancient Egypt
- Index of Egyptian mythology articles
- Inebny
- Inebu-hedj
- Inenek-Inti
- Ineni (queen)
- Ineni
- Inetkaes
- Ini (pharaoh)
- Insinger Papyrus
- Installation of the Vizier
- Institut Français d'Archéologie Orientale
- Instruction of Amenemope
- Instruction of Ankhsheshonq
- Instruction of Any
- Instruction of Hardjedef
- Instructions of Amenemhat
- Instructions of Kagemni
- Intef (general)
- Intef III
- Intef II
- Intefiqer
- Intef I
- Intef the Elder
- Intercalary month (Egypt)
- Inti (Ancient Egyptian official)
- Inventory Stela
- Inykhnum
- Ipi (vizier)
- Ipi Heryib
- Ippolito Rosellini
- Ipu (nurse)
- Ipuki
- Iput II
- Iput I
- Ipuwer Papyrus
- Ipy (goddess)
- Ipy (noble)
- Iqer
- Irer
- Irimayašša
- Irsu
- Iry-Hor
- Iry-pat
- Irynachet
- Isesi-ankh
- Iset (daughter of Amenhotep III)
- Iset (daughter of Thutmose III)
- Iset (priestess)
- Iset (queen)
- Isetemkheb D
- Isetnofret (daughter of Khaemwaset)
- Isetnofret II
- Isetnofret
- Iset Ta-Hemdjert
- Isfet (Egyptian mythology)
- Ishemai
- Isidorus (Egyptian rebel)
- Isis
- Isitnofret
- Ita (princess)
- Itakayt (Senusret I)
- Itakayt
- Itaweret
- Itet
- Itjtawy
- Itysen
- Iu-miteru
- Iuenka
- Iufaa (vizier)
- Iufaa
- Iufni
- Iuhetibu Fendy
- Iuhetibu
- Iunit
- Iunmin I
- Iunmutef
- Iunre
- Iuput II
- Iuput I
- Iuput
- Iusaaset
- Iushenshen
- Iuty
- Iuwelot
- Iyibkhentre
- Iymeru (son of Ankhu)
- Iynefer II
- Iynefer I
- Iyri
- Iytjenu
- Izi (Ancient Egyptian official)
- Izi (nomarch)
- Izi (overseer of the treasury)

== J ==
- J. Gwyn Griffiths
- J. W. B. Barns
- Jaana Toivari-Viitala
- Jack Plumley
- Jacobus Van Dijk
- Jacques-Édouard Berger
- Jacques de Morgan
- Jacques Kinnaer
- Jacques Vandier (Egyptologist)
- Jadwiga Lipińska
- Jaffa
- James Burton (Egyptologist)
- James Henry Breasted
- James O. Mills
- James Peter Allen
- James Quibell
- Jan Assmann
- Janet Gourlay
- Janet Helen Johnson
- Janet May Buchanan
- Janet Richards (Egyptologist)
- Jan Potocki
- Jar of Xerxes I
- Jaromír Málek
- Jaroslav Černý (Egyptologist)
- Jean-Baptiste Lepère
- Jean-Baptiste Prosper Jollois
- Jean-Claude Goyon
- Jean-François Champollion
- Jean-Philippe Lauer
- Jean-Pierre Corteggiani
- Jean-Pierre Houdin
- Jean-Vincent Scheil
- Jean-Yves Empereur
- Jean Bingen
- Jean Capart
- Jean Clédat
- Jean Kérisel
- Jean Lauffray
- Jean Leclant
- Jeanne Marie Thérèse Vandier d'Abbadie
- Jean Sainte-Fare Garnot
- Jean Vercoutter
- Jean Yoyotte
- Jebel Barkal
- Jebel Dosha
- Jens Lieblein
- Jeroboam's Revolt
- Jersey Mummy
- Jiro Kondo
- Joachim Friedrich Quack
- Joan Crowfoot Payne
- Joann Fletcher
- Jochem Kahl
- Johan David Åkerblad
- Johannes Dümichen
- Johann Jakob Hess (Egyptologist)
- John Baines (Egyptologist)
- John Beasley Greene
- John Coleman Darnell
- John D. Ray
- John Gardner Wilkinson
- John Gee
- John Pendlebury
- John Romer (Egyptologist)
- John Shae Perring
- John Wilson (Egyptologist)
- John W. Tait
- Joos van Ghistele
- Joris Borghouts
- Josef W. Wegner
- Joseph (Genesis)
- Joseph Bonomi the Younger
- Joseph Davidovits
- Joseph Manning (historian)
- Joseph Smith Hypocephalus
- Joseph Smith Papyri
- Joseph Étienne Gautier
- Journal of Egyptian Archaeology
- Journal of the American Research Center in Egypt
- Joyce Tyldesley
- Jozef Vergote
- Juba II
- Jubilee Pavilion (hieroglyph)
- Judicial Papyrus of Turin
- Julius Caesar
- Julius Julianus
- Jürgen von Beckerath
- Juridical Stela

== K ==
- Ka (pharaoh)
- Ka-Nefer-Nefer
- Kaaper
- Kadashman-Enlil I
- Kadero (archaeological site)
- Kadesh inscriptions
- Kaemsekhem
- Kaemtjenent
- Kafr Ammar
- Kagemni I
- Kagemni
- Kahun Gynaecological Papyrus
- Kahun Papyri
- Kaikhenet II
- Kainepolis, Egypt
- Kamal el-Mallakh
- Kamose
- Kampp 150
- Kampp 161
- Kandake
- Kanefer (High Priest of Ptah)
- Kanefer
- Kapes
- Kara Cooney
- Karanis Site Museum
- Karanog
- Karimala
- Karin Sowada
- Karkamani
- Karl Jansen-Winkeln
- Karl Piehl
- Karl Richard Lepsius
- Karnak King List
- Karnak Open Air Museum
- Karnak
- Karol Myśliwiec
- Karomama A
- Karomama II
- Karomama I
- Karomama Meritmut
- Kashta
- Ka statue of king Hor
- Ka statue
- Kate Bradbury Griffith
- Käthe Bosse-Griffiths
- Kathrin Gabler
- Kathryn A. Bard
- Katja Lembke
- Kawa, Sudan
- Kawab
- Kawit (queen)
- Kay (vizier)
- Kazimierz Michałowski
- Kebechet
- Keftiu
- Kehek
- Kek (mythology)
- Kekheretnebti
- Kemetism
- Keminub
- Kemsit
- Ken-Amun
- Kenneth Kitchen
- Kent R. Weeks
- Kerma culture
- Kerma Museum
- Kerma
- Khaankhre Sobekhotep
- Khabash
- Khabawsokar
- Khaba
- Khabekhnet
- Khaemhat
- Khaemtir
- Khaemwaset (18th dynasty)
- Khaemwaset (20th dynasty)
- Khaemwaset (Nubian official)
- Khaemwaset (vizier)
- Khaemweset
- Khafre Enthroned
- Khafre
- Khahotepre Sobekhotep VI
- Khakau (king's son)
- Khakaureseneb
- Khakheperraseneb
- Khaled El-Enany
- Khamerernebty II
- Khamerernebty I
- Khamudi
- Khamure
- Khasekhemwy
- Khaset (nome)
- Khat (apparel)
- Khawy
- Khay (Nubian official)
- Khay (vizier)
- Khayu
- Khedebneithirbinet I
- Khekeret-nisut
- Khendjer
- Khenemetneferhedjet III
- Khenemetneferhedjet II
- Khenemetneferhedjet I
- Khenemetneferhedjet
- Khenmes
- Khenmetptah
- Khenmet
- Khensa
- Khensit
- Khentetka
- Khenthap
- Khenti-Amentiu
- Khenti-kheti
- Khentika Ikhekhi
- Khentkaus III
- Khentkaus II
- Khentkaus I
- Khenut
- Khepresh
- Khepri
- Khereduankh
- Kherty
- Kheti (treasurer)
- Kheti (vizier)
- Khety (BH17)
- Khety (M12.3)
- Khety I (nomarch)
- Khety II (nomarch)
- Khnumhotep and Niankhkhnum
- Khnumhotep III
- Khnumhotep II
- Khnumhotep IV
- Khnumhotep I
- Khnum
- Khonsu (TT31)
- Khonsuemheb and the Ghost
- Khonsu
- Khopesh
- Khormusan
- Khor
- Khubau
- Khuenre
- Khufukhaf II
- Khufukhaf I
- Khufu ship
- Khufu Statuette
- Khufu
- Khuiqer
- Khuit II
- Khuit I
- Khui
- Khuwyptah
- Khuwyt
- Khyan
- Kim Ryholt
- King's Highway (ancient)
- Kingdom of al-Abwab
- Kingdom of Kush
- King Neferkare and General Sasenet
- Kiosk of Qertassi
- Kiya
- Km and Km.t (Kemet) (hieroglyphs)
- Kmt (magazine)
- Kneph
- Knot (hieroglyph)
- Kohl (cosmetics)
- Koiak
- Kolanthes
- Kom al-Ahmar Necropolis
- Kom el-Hisn
- Kom el-Nana
- Kom El Sultan
- Kom Firin
- Kom Ombo
- Kothar-wa-Khasis
- Kulb
- Kulubnarti church
- Kulubnarti
- Kumma (Nubia)
- Kurna
- Kurt Sethe
- Kushite religion
- KV1
- KV2
- KV3
- KV4
- KV5
- KV6
- KV7
- KV8
- KV9
- KV10
- KV11
- KV12
- KV13
- KV14
- KV15
- KV16
- KV18
- KV19
- KV20
- KV21
- KV26
- KV27
- KV28
- KV29
- KV30
- KV31
- KV32
- KV33
- KV34
- KV37
- KV38
- KV39
- KV40
- KV41
- KV42
- KV43
- KV44
- KV45
- KV47
- KV48
- KV49
- KV50
- KV51
- KV52
- KV53
- KV54
- KV55
- KV56
- KV57
- KV58
- KV59
- KV60
- KV61
- KV63
- KV64
- KV65
- Kyphi
- Kyriakos of Makuria

== L ==
- Labaya
- Labib Habachi
- Ladice (Cyrenaean princess)
- Lady of the Lions
- Lady Rai
- Lagus
- Lahun Mathematical Papyri
- Lake Moeris
- Lake of fire
- Land, irrigated (hieroglyph)
- Land of Goshen
- Land of Manu
- Land of Punt
- Land reform in ancient Egypt
- Laomedon of Mytilene
- László Kákosy
- László Török
- Late Period of Egypt
- Lattice stool
- Laurel Bestock
- Laurent Bavay
- Laure Pantalacci
- Layer Pyramid
- Lector priest
- Legs-forward (hieroglyph)
- Leonard H. Lesko
- Leon of Pella
- Leontopolis (Heliopolis)
- Leontopolis
- Leopard head (hieroglyph)
- Leopard skin (clothing in Ancient Egypt)
- Leo Reinisch
- Lepidotonpolis
- Lepsius I Pyramid
- Lepsius list of pyramids
- Lepsius L
- Lepsius XXIV
- Leslie Greener
- Letopolis
- Letters to the dead
- Levallois technique
- Library of Alexandria
- Libu
- Libyan Palette
- Lighthouse of Alexandria
- Lisht
- Litany of Re
- Litany of the Eye of Horus
- London Medical Papyrus
- Lost Army of Cambyses
- Lotfy El Tanbouli
- Lotiform vessels (Metropolitan Museum of Art)
- Lotus chalice
- Louis Vico Žabkar
- Louvre Pyramid
- Lower Egypt
- Lower Nubia
- Loyalist Teaching
- Lucius Laberius Maximus
- Lucius Lusius Geta
- Lucius Seius Strabo
- Lucius Volusius Maecianus
- Ludmila Matiegková
- Ludwig Borchardt
- Ludwig David Morenz
- Lug (knob)
- Luigi Vassalli
- Luise Klebs
- Lunette (stele)
- Luxor Museum
- Luxor Obelisks
- Luxor statue cache
- Luxor Temple
- Luxor
- Lycopolis (Delta)
- Lyla Pinch Brock
- Lysandra
- Lysimachus of Alexandria
- Lysimachus

== M ==
- Maahes
- Maa Kheru
- Maarten Raven
- Maathorneferure
- Maatkare B
- Maatkare Mutemhat
- Maat
- MacGregor plaque
- Machimoi
- Mafdet
- Magas of Cyrene
- Magas of Egypt
- Mahat chapel of Mentuhotep II
- Mahmoud Maher Taha
- Mahu (noble)
- Mahu (official)
- Maia (nurse)
- Maiherpri
- Makuria
- Malaqaye
- Malewiebamani
- Malkata
- Malonaqen
- Malqata Menat
- Mamdouh Eldamaty
- Mammisi
- Man-prisoner (hieroglyph)
- Man-seated: arms in adoration
- Mandulis
- Manefer
- Manetho
- Manfred Bietak
- Manfred Cassirer
- Manshiyat Ezzat Palette
- Manshiyat Ezzat
- Manuel de Codage
- Marc Bédarride
- Marcelle Baud
- Marcelle Werbrouck
- Marc Gabolde
- Marcus Junius Rufus
- Marcus Petronius Mamertinus
- Marcus Rutilius Lupus
- Margaret Benson
- Margaret Murray
- Margaret Stefana Drower
- Marguerite Naville
- Marianne Brocklehurst
- Mark Antony
- Mark Lehner
- Markos of Makuria
- Martin Bommas
- Martin Isler
- Maru-Aten
- Maryannu
- Mary Brodrick
- María del Carmen Pérez Díe
- Masaharta
- Mask of Tutankhamun
- Mast (hieroglyph)
- Mastaba of Hesy-Re
- Mastaba of Kanefer
- Mastaba of Kaninisut
- Mastaba of Seshemnefer
- Mastaba of Ti
- Mastaba S3035
- Mastaba S3503
- Mastaba S3504
- Mastabat al-Fir'aun
- Mastaba
- Mathematics in Ancient Egypt: A Contextual History
- Maurice Alliot
- Max Uhlemann
- May (governor)
- May (noble)
- Maya (High Priest of Amun)
- Maya (treasurer)
- Mayer Papyri
- Mayet (ancient Egypt)
- Mayor of Thebes
- Mazaces
- Mazghuna
- Measuring rod
- Medamud
- Medical Ostraca of Deir el-Medina
- Medinet Habu king list
- Medinet Habu
- Medinet Madi
- Medius of Larissa
- Medjay
- Medjed (fish)
- Medjed
- Medunefer (Giza G 4630)
- Medunefer
- Mehen (game)
- Mehen
- Mehet-Weret
- Mehit
- Mehu
- Mehytenweskhet
- Meidum
- Meinarti
- Meir, Egypt
- Meketaten
- Meketre
- Meleager (general)
- Mémoires sur l'Égypte
- Memphis (wife of Epaphus)
- Memphis, Egypt
- Memphite Formula
- Memphite Necropolis
- Menander (general)
- Menat
- Menches
- Mendes
- Menedemus (general)
- Menelaus (son of Lagus)
- Menes
- Menet (princess)
- Menhet, Menwi and Merti
- Menhit
- Meni (high official)
- Menka (queen)
- Menkare
- Menkauhor Kaiu
- Menkaure
- Menkaure triads
- Menkheperraseneb I
- Menkheperre (name)
- Menkheperre (prince)
- Menkheperreseneb II
- Menkheperre
- Menna
- Menouf
- Menouthis
- Mentuemhat
- Mentuherkhepeshef (son of Ramesses IX)
- Mentuherkhepeshef A
- Mentuhotep (god's father)
- Mentuhotep (queen)
- Mentuhotep (treasurer)
- Mentuhotep III
- Mentuhotep II
- Mentuhotep IV
- Mentuhotep I
- Merankhre Mentuhotep
- Merdjefare
- Merefnebef
- Merenhor
- Merenptah (prince)
- Merenre Nemtyemsaf II
- Merenre Nemtyemsaf I
- Mereret (12th Dynasty)
- Mereruka
- Meresamun
- Meresankh (given name)
- Meresankh III
- Meresankh II
- Meresankh IV
- Meresankh I
- Meret-Isesi
- Meretnebty
- Meretseger (queen)
- Meretseger
- Meret
- Merhotepre Ini
- Merhotepre Sobekhotep
- Meriiti
- Merikare
- Merimde culture
- Merit-Ptah
- Meritamen
- Meritaten Tasherit
- Meritaten
- Meritites II
- Meritites IV
- Meritites I
- Meritites
- Merkare
- Merkawre Sobekhotep
- Merkheperre
- Merkhet
- Merkurios of Makuria
- Merneferre Ay
- Merneith
- Merneptah Stele
- Merneptah
- Meroitic language
- Meroitic script
- Meroë
- Mersekhemre Ined
- Mershepsesre Ini II
- Meru (overseer of sealers)
- Meru, Bebi
- Mervat Seif el-Din
- Mery (High Priest of Amun)
- Mery (High Priest of Osiris)
- Meryaa
- Meryamun (20th dynasty)
- Meryatum II
- Meryatum
- Meryey
- Meryhathor
- Meryibre Khety
- Merymose
- Meryneith
- Meryptah (high priest of Ptah)
- Meryptah
- Meryre (treasurer)
- Meryre II
- Meryre
- Merysekhmet
- Meryteti
- Merytre-Hatshepsut
- Merytre
- Mesehti
- Mesen-ka
- Meshir
- Meshwesh
- Meskhenet
- Mesori
- Messuy
- Metjen
- Metternich Stela
- Michael A. Hoffman
- Michael D. Rhodes
- Michał Tyszkiewicz (Egyptologist)
- Michela Schiff Giorgini
- Michel Baud
- Michel Chauveau
- Middle Egypt
- Middle Kingdom of Egypt
- Milan Papyrus
- Military of ancient Egypt
- Military of ancient Nubia
- Milkilu
- Min (god)
- Min (treasurer)
- Mindjedef
- Minemhat
- Min Festival
- Mining industry of Egypt
- Ministry of Tourism and Antiquities
- Minkhaf I
- Minmontu
- Minmose (high priest)
- Minmose (overseer of granaries)
- Minmose (overseer of works)
- Minmose
- Minnefer (vizier)
- Minnefer
- Minoan frescoes from Tell el-Dab'a
- Minor tombs in the Valley of the Kings
- Min Palette
- Minya, Egypt
- Mirgissa
- Miriam Lichtheim
- Miriam
- Miroslav Verner
- Mitanni
- MMA 56
- MMA 57
- MMA 59
- MMA 60
- MMA 507
- MMA 729
- Mnevis
- Modius (headdress)
- Monica Hanna
- Montuherkhopshef (son of Ramesses III)
- Montu
- Monumental depictions of Amanitore
- Mortuary Temple of Amenhotep III
- Mortuary Temple of Ay and Horemheb
- Mortuary temple of Hatshepsut
- Mortuary Temple of Mentuhotep III
- Mortuary Temple of Merneptah
- Mortuary Temple of Seti I
- Mortuary temple of Thutmose I
- Mortuary temple of Thutmose III
- Mortuary temple
- Moscow Mathematical Papyrus
- Mose (Ancient Egyptian official)
- Mose (scribe)
- Moses
- Mouseion
- Moustafa Gadalla
- Mummies: A Voyage Through Eternity
- Mummification Museum
- Mummy
- Musawwarat es-Sufra
- Museo Egizio
- Mutbaal
- Mutbenret
- Mutemwiya
- Muthis
- Mutnedjmet (21st dynasty)
- Mutnedjmet
- Mutnofret
- Mut
- Myos Hormos
- Myriam Seco
- Myrmidon of Athens
- Mysteries of Isis
- Mysteries of Osiris
- Mythographus Homericus

== N ==
- N. de Garis Davies
- Nabil Swelim
- Nabta Playa
- Naguib Kanawati
- Nahirqo
- Nakht (high steward)
- Nakht (nomarch)
- Nakhtmin (charioteer)
- Nakhtmin (scribe)
- Nakhtmin (troop commander)
- Nakhtmin
- Nakhtneith
- Nakhtpaaten
- Nakhtubasterau
- Nakht
- Nakhy
- Naos (hieroglyph)
- Naparaye
- Napata
- Naphtali Lewis
- Naqada culture
- Naqada III
- Naqada II
- Naqada I
- Naqada
- Naqa
- Narmer Macehead
- Narmer Palette
- Narmer
- Nasakhma
- Nasalsa
- Nasekheperensekhmet
- Nash Papyrus
- Nastasen
- Natacha Rambova
- Natakamani
- Natalya Semper
- Nathalie Beaux-Grimal
- Nathalie Bosson
- Naucratis
- Nauny
- Nawidemak
- Naziba
- Nearchus
- Nebamun (vizier)
- Nebamun
- Nebankh
- Nebdjefare
- Nebemakhet
- Nebenkharu
- Nebet (queen)
- Nebetah
- Nebethetepet
- Nebetia
- Nebetiunet
- Nebetnehat
- Nebettawy
- Nebet
- Nebiryraw II
- Nebiryraw I
- Nebit
- Nebkaure Khety
- Nebka
- Nebmaatre (prince)
- Nebmaatre
- Nebnerou
- Nebneteru Tenry
- Nebpu
- Nebra (pharaoh)
- Nebsemi
- Nebsenre
- Nebtuwi
- Nebtu
- Nebty-tepites
- Nebty name
- Nebunebty
- Nebwawy
- Nebwenenef
- Necho II
- Necho I
- Nectanebo II
- Nectanebo I
- Nedjeftet
- Nedjemibre
- Nedjem
- Neferefre
- Neferhetepes (princess)
- Neferhetepes
- Neferhotep (scribe of the great enclosure)
- Neferhotep III
- Neferhotep I
- Neferirkare Kakai
- Neferirkare
- Neferitatjenen
- Neferkahor
- Neferkamin Anu
- Neferkamin
- Neferkare II
- Neferkare Iymeru
- Neferkare I
- Neferkare Khendu
- Neferkare Neby
- Neferkare Pepiseneb
- Neferkare Tereru
- Neferkare VIII
- Neferkare VII
- Neferkasokar
- Neferkauhor
- Neferkaure
- Neferka
- Neferkheperu-her-sekheper
- Nefermaat II
- Nefermaat
- Neferneferuaten Tasherit
- Neferneferuaten
- Neferneferure
- Neferronpet
- Nefer-Setekh
- Nefersheshemre
- Nefertari (18th dynasty)
- Nefertari
- Nefertem
- Neferthenut
- Nefertiabet
- Nefertiti Bust
- Nefertiti
- Nefertkau III
- Nefertkau II
- Nefertkau I
- Neferubity
- Neferu III
- Neferu II
- Neferu I
- Neferukayet
- Neferuptah
- Neferure
- Neferweben
- Nefer
- Nefrina
- Nefrusy
- Nehebkau
- Neheri II
- Neheri I
- Nehesy
- Nehi (Viceroy of Kush)
- Nehmes Bastet
- Nehmetawy
- Nehsi
- Neith (wife of Pepi II)
- Neithhotep
- Neith
- Nekauba
- Nekhbet
- Nekhen (nome)
- Nemes
- Nemty
- Neni
- Nenkhefetkai
- Neoptolemus (general)
- Neper (mythology)
- Nepherites II
- Nepherites I
- Nephthys
- Nerikare
- Neserkauhor
- Neshmet
- Nesitanebetashru
- Nesitaudjatakhet
- Neskhons
- Nespamedu
- Nespaqashuty C
- Nestor L'Hôte
- Nesyamun
- Neterkheperre Meryptah called Pipi II
- Netjeraperef
- Netjerkare Siptah
- Netjernakht
- Neues Museum
- Newborn calf (hieroglyph)
- New Chronology (Rohl)
- New Kalabsha
- New Kingdom of Egypt
- New Wadi es-Sebua
- New Year's bottle
- Ni-Neith
- Niankh-Pepy-kem
- Niankhba
- Nicanor (Ptolemaic general)
- Nicanor (son of Parmenion)
- Nicholas Millet
- Nicholas Reeves
- Nicolas Grimal
- Nicolaus of Aetolia
- Night (hieroglyph)
- Nikaiankh II
- Nikaiankh I
- Nikare II
- Nikare
- Nikaure
- Nile: An Ancient Egyptian Quest
- Nile crocodile
- Nile Delta
- Nile Level Texts
- Nile mosaic of Palestrina
- Nilometer
- Nilotic landscape
- Nilus (mythology)
- Nimaathap II
- Nimaathap
- Nimlot A
- Nimlot B
- Nimlot C
- Nimlot of Hermopolis
- Nine bows
- Nineteenth Dynasty of Egypt family tree
- Nineteenth Dynasty of Egypt
- Ninth Dynasty of Egypt
- Niqmaddu II
- Nisuheqet
- Nitocris I (Divine Adoratrice)
- Nitocris II
- Nitocris
- Nobatia
- Nodjmet
- Nofret (13th dynasty)
- Nofret
- Nomarch
- Nome (Egypt)
- Nomen (ancient Egypt)
- Nora E. Scott
- Nora Griffith
- Norea
- Noret-Khent
- North African elephant
- Northampton Sekhemka statue
- North Asasif
- Northern Mazghuna pyramid
- Northern Palace (Amarna)
- North Riverside Palace
- Nubayrah Stele
- Nubemhat
- Nubemtekh
- Nubhetepti-khered
- Nubhetepti
- Nubian architecture
- Nubian Desert
- Nubian ibex
- Nubian languages
- Nubian pyramids
- Nubian vault
- Nubian wig
- Nubia
- Nubkhaes
- Nubkheperre Intef
- Nubkhesbed
- Nubnefer
- Nubwenet
- Nuit
- Numbers in Egyptian mythology
- Nun (mythology)
- Nuribta
- Nut (goddess)
- Nuya
- Ny-Hor
- Nyibunesu
- Nykara
- Nynetjer
- Nyuserre Ini

== O ==
- Obelisk (hieroglyph)
- Obelisk ship
- Obelisks of Nectanebo II
- Obelisk
- Oedipus Aegyptiacus
- Ogdoad (Egyptian)
- Ola El Aguizy
- Olbia (Egypt)
- Old Dongola
- Old Kingdom of Egypt
- Old Nubian
- Olympiodorus of Thebes
- Onomasticon of Amenope
- Onuris
- Opening of the mouth ceremony
- Opet Festival
- Ophellas
- Oracle of the Lamb
- Oracle of the Potter
- Orly Goldwasser
- Orontobates
- Oryx nome
- Osarseph
- Oscar Lemm
- Osireion
- Osiris myth
- Osiris
- Osorkon Bust
- Osorkon C
- Osorkon III
- Osorkon II
- Osorkon IV
- Osorkon I
- Osorkon the Elder
- Ostracon of Prince Sethherkhepshef
- Ostracon of Senenmut
- Ostracon
- Ostrakine
- Otto Rubensohn
- Otto Schaden
- Ouroboros
- Outline of ancient Egypt
- Overseer of cattle
- Overseer of fields
- Overseer of the treasuries
- Overseer of Upper Egypt
- Oxford Encyclopedia of Ancient Egypt
- Oxford Palette
- Oxyartes
- Oxyrhynchus Papyri
- Oxyrhynchus
- Ozymandias
- Ozymandias (Smith)

== P ==
- P. L. O. Guy
- Paatenemheb
- Pabasa
- Pachnamunis
- Paddle doll
- Padiamenope
- Padiiset's Statue
- Paenniut
- Pahemnetjer
- Paheri
- Pahor Labib
- Pahura
- Painting in Ancient Egypt
- Painting of Lady Tjepu
- Pakhet
- Palermo Stone
- Palmette
- Pami II
- Pami
- Panebtawy
- Paneb
- Panehesy (vizier)
- Panehesy
- Panehsy (TT16)
- Pantjeny
- Paoni
- Paopi
- Papyrology
- Papyrus Ambras
- Papyrus Anastasi I
- Papyrus Boulaq 18
- Papyrus Brooklyn 35.1446
- Papyrus Carlsberg Collection
- Papyrus Golénischeff
- Papyrus Graecus Holmiensis
- Papyrus Harris 500
- Papyrus Harris I
- Papyrus Hood
- Papyrus Lansing
- Papyrus Leopold II
- Papyrus of Ani
- Papyrus roll-tied
- Papyrus Salt 124
- Papyrus stem (hieroglyph)
- Papyrus
- Paraemheb
- Pareherwenemef (20th dynasty)
- Pareherwenemef
- Paremhat
- Parennefer called Wennefer
- Parennefer
- Parmenion (architect)
- Parmenion
- Parmouti
- Pascale Ballet
- Paser (mayor)
- Paser (vizier)
- Paser Crossword Stela
- Paser II
- Paser I
- Pashedu
- Pasherienptah III
- Pashons
- Pathros
- Patrizia Piacentini
- Paul Barguet
- Paul Bucher
- Paule Posener-Kriéger
- Paul Ghalioungui
- Paul Sussman
- Paweraa
- Pawura
- Payeftjauemawyneith
- Pearce Paul Creasman
- Pebatjma
- Pebekkamen
- Pediese (prince in Athribis)
- Pediese, chief of the Ma
- Pedubast (high steward)
- Pedubast II
- Pedubast I
- Peftjauawybast
- Pehen-Ptah
- Pehenuikai
- Pehernefer
- Peithon (son of Agenor)
- Peithon
- Peksater
- Pelusium
- Penamun
- Penebui
- Penelope Eames
- Penelope Wilson
- Pennesuttawy
- Penreshnes
- Penre
- Pensekhmet
- Pentawer
- Penthelia
- Penthu
- Pentu
- Pepi II Neferkare
- Pepi I Meryre
- Pepyankh the Black
- Pepyankh the Middle
- Per-Wadjet (Upper Egypt)
- Percy Newberry
- Perdiccas
- Periodization of ancient Egypt
- Perit (goddess)
- Perla Fuscaldo
- Perneb
- Persenet
- Peru-nefer
- Peseshet
- Petbe
- Peteese and Pihor
- Peter Dorman
- Peter J. Brand
- Peter Kaplony
- Peter le Page Renouf
- Peter Ucko
- Petiese
- Petosiris
- Petubastis III
- Phantasia (poet)
- Pharaoh's daughter (wife of Solomon)
- Pharaoh (Book of Abraham)
- Pharaoh (film)
- Pharaoh (module)
- Pharaoh (Old English poem)
- Pharaoh (Prus novel)
- Pharaoh (Smith novel)
- Pharaoh (video game)
- Pharaoh-seated, with flail & red crown (hieroglyph)
- Pharaoh: A New Era
- Pharaoh ant
- Pharaoh Hound
- Pharaoh in Islam
- Pharaohs in the Bible
- Pharaoh
- Pharaonic Tayma inscription
- Pharaonism
- Pharnabazus III
- Pharnabazus II
- Pharnuches of Lycia
- Pherendates II
- Pherendates
- Phernouphis
- Pheron
- Philae obelisk
- Philae temple complex
- Philagrius (prefect of Egypt)
- Philip (husband of Berenice I of Egypt)
- Philistines
- Philitas of Cos
- Philotas (satrap)
- Philotas
- Philotera
- Philoteris
- Philoxenus (general)
- Philo
- Phrataphernes
- Phylakitai
- Pi-HaHiroth
- Pi-Ramesses
- Pi-Sekhemkheperre
- Piankh
- Pick (hieroglyph)
- Pierre Grandet
- Pierre Jouguet
- Pierre Lacau
- Pierre Louis Jean Casimir de Blacas
- Pierre Montet
- Pierre Tallet
- Pihuri
- Pilgrimage
- Pimay
- Pinakes
- Pinedjem II
- Pinedjem I
- Pinehesy
- Pipi A
- Pirissi and Tulubri
- Pítati
- Pithom
- Piye
- Plagues of Egypt
- Plummet amulet
- Pomponius Januarianus
- Poo Mu-chou
- Portal Temple
- Portraiture in ancient Egypt
- Potasimto
- Pothinus
- Potipherah
- Pr (hieroglyph)
- Prayers of Pahery
- Precinct of Amun-Re
- Precinct of Montu
- Precinct of Mut
- Prehistoric Egypt
- Prehotep II
- Prehotep I
- Prenomen (Ancient Egypt)
- Priestess of Hathor
- Prince Djedi
- Prince Rahotep
- Princess Khamerernebty
- Princess Khentkaus
- Prisse Papyrus
- Prophecy of Neferti
- Prostration formula
- Proteus (king of Egypt)
- Prudhoe Lions
- Psammetichus IV
- Psammuthes
- Psamtik III
- Psamtik II
- Psamtik I
- Psamtikseneb
- Pschent
- Psusennes III
- Psusennes II
- Psusennes I
- Ptah-Du-Auu
- Ptah-Patek
- Ptahemhat called Ty
- Ptahemwia
- Ptahhotep (Djedkare)
- Ptahhotep Desher
- Ptahhotep Tjefi
- Ptahhotep
- Ptahmose (treasurer)
- Ptahmose (vizier)
- Ptahmose, son of Menkheper
- Ptahmose, son of Thutmose
- Ptahmose I (High Priest of Ptah)
- Ptahmose II (High Priest of Ptah)
- Ptahshepses (high priest)
- Ptahshepses
- Ptah
- Ptolemaic army
- Ptolemaic coinage
- Ptolemaic cult of Alexander the Great
- Ptolemaic dynasty
- Ptolemaic Kingdom
- Ptolemaic navy
- Ptolemaic synodal decrees
- Ptolemy (son of Seleucus)
- Ptolemy Apion
- Ptolemy Ceraunus
- Ptolemy Epigonos
- Ptolemy Eupator
- Ptolemy III Euergetes
- Ptolemy II of Telmessos
- Ptolemy II Philadelphus
- Ptolemy I Soter
- Ptolemy IV Philopator
- Ptolemy IX Soter
- Ptolemy of Cyprus
- Ptolemy of Mauretania
- Ptolemy Philadelphus (son of Cleopatra)
- Ptolemy V Epiphanes
- Ptolemy VIII Physcon
- Ptolemy VII Neos Philopator
- Ptolemy VI Philometor
- Ptolemy X Alexander I
- Ptolemy XI Alexander II
- Ptolemy XII Auletes
- Ptolemy XIII Theos Philopator
- Ptolemy XIV Philopator
- Pu-Ba'lu
- Puimre
- Pustule (hieroglyph)
- Put (biblical figure)
- Pyhia
- Pylon (architecture)
- Pyramid G1-a
- Pyramid G1-b
- Pyramid G1-c
- Pyramid G1-d
- Pyramid G2-a
- Pyramid G3-a
- Pyramid G3-b
- Pyramid G3-c
- Pyramid inch
- Pyramidion of Amenemhat III
- Pyramidion
- Pyramid of Ahmose
- Pyramid of Amenemhat I
- Pyramid of Ameny Qemau
- Pyramid of Athribis
- Pyramid of Djedefre
- Pyramid of Djedkare Isesi
- Pyramid of Djoser
- Pyramid of Elephantine
- Pyramid of Ity
- Pyramid of Khafre
- Pyramid of Khendjer
- Pyramid of Khentkaus I
- Pyramid of Khui
- Pyramid of Menkaure
- Pyramid of Merenre
- Pyramid of Merikare
- Pyramid of Naqada
- Pyramid of Neferefre
- Pyramid of Neferirkare
- Pyramid of Neferkare Neby
- Pyramid of Nubkheperre Intef
- Pyramid of Nyuserre
- Pyramid of Pepi II
- Pyramid of Pepi I
- Pyramid of Reherishefnakht
- Pyramid of Sahure
- Pyramid of Seila
- Pyramid of Senusret III
- Pyramid of Senusret II
- Pyramid of Senusret I
- Pyramid of Teti
- Pyramid of Unas
- Pyramid of Userkaf
- Pyramidology
- Pyramids of Meroë
- Pyramid Texts

== Q ==
- Qa'a
- Qahedjet
- Qakare Ibi
- Qakare Ini
- Qalhata
- Qar (Ancient Egyptian official)
- Qar (doctor)
- Qar (vizier)
- Qareh Khawoserre
- Qasr Ibrim
- Qaw el-Kebir
- Qed-her
- Qeni
- Qenna
- Qen
- Qetesh
- Qift
- Qiman al-Arus
- Qore (title)
- Quadrat (hieroglyph block)
- Quay with Sphinxes
- Qubbet el-Hawa
- Queen of Heaven (antiquity)
- Qurnet Murai
- Qustul
- Qus
- QV44
- QV60
- QV68
- QV71
- QV75
- QV80

== R ==
- R. A. Schwaller de Lubicz
- Ra (board game)
- Radiate crown
- Raemka
- Raet-Tawy
- Raherka and Meresankh
- Rahonem
- Rainer Hannig
- Rainer Stadelmann
- Ramesses (prince)
- Ramesses-Meryamun-Nebweben
- Ramesses III prisoner tiles
- Ramesses III
- Ramesses II
- Ramesses IV
- Ramesses IX Tomb-plan Ostracon
- Ramesses IX
- Ramesses I
- Ramessesnakht
- Ramesses VIII
- Ramesses VII
- Ramesses VI
- Ramesses V
- Ramesses XI
- Ramesses X
- Ramesseum king list
- Ramesseum magician's box
- Ramesseum medical papyri
- Ramesseum
- Ramesside star clocks
- Ramose (18th Dynasty)
- Ramose (prince)
- Ramose (TT7)
- Ramose (TT55)
- Ramose and Hatnofer
- Ramose
- Ramushenti
- Ranefer (High Priest of Ptah)
- Ranefer
- Raoul Curiel
- Raphael of Makuria
- Raphia Decree
- Rashepses
- Rawer (5th Dynasty)
- Rawer (vizier)
- Raymond O. Faulkner
- Raymond Weill
- Ra
- Reading Egyptian Art
- Reanap
- Red auxiliary number
- Rededjet
- Red Pyramid
- Regalia of the Pharaoh
- Reginald Engelbach
- Rehuankh
- Rehuerdjersen
- Reign of Cleopatra
- Reisner Papyrus
- Rekhetre
- Rekhmire
- Rekhyt
- Relief of Gebel Sheikh Suleiman
- Rem (mythology)
- Renenutet
- Renpetneferet
- Renpet
- Renseneb
- Renée Friedman
- Reptynub
- Repyt
- Reserve head
- Resheph
- Resseneb (son of Ankhu)
- Restoration Stela
- Retjenu
- Revenge of the Mummy
- Revue d'Égyptologie
- Rhampsinit
- Rhind Mathematical Papyrus 2/n table
- Rhind Mathematical Papyrus
- Rhinocorura
- Rhodopis
- Rib-Hadda
- Ricardo Caminos
- Richard Anthony Parker
- Richard B. Parkinson
- Richard H. Wilkinson
- Richard Lobban
- Rifa'a at-Tahtawi
- Rifeh
- Rishi coffin
- River God
- Road (hieroglyph)
- Robert Greg
- Robert Grenville Gayer-Anderson
- Robert Hay (Egyptologist)
- Robert K. Ritner
- Robert Morkot
- Robert Partridge (Egyptologist)
- Roemer- und Pelizaeus-Museum Hildesheim
- Roger Khawam
- Roma called Roy
- Roman Egypt
- Roman pharaoh
- Rope stretcher
- Rosalind Moss
- Rosetta Stone decree
- Rosetta Stone
- Rosicrucian Egyptian Museum
- Rostislav Holthoer
- Roxana
- Royal Cache
- Royal Tomb of Akhenaten
- Royal Wadi and tombs
- Rubutu
- Rudamun
- Ruiu
- Ruth Schumann Antelme
- Ruty
- Rylands Papyri

== S ==
- S 9 (Abydos)
- S 10 (Abydos)
- Sabaces
- Sabef
- Sabni
- Sabrakamani
- Sabu (Egyptian official)
- Sabu also called Ibebi
- Sabu also called Kem
- Sabu also called Tjety
- Sack of Thebes
- Sadeh (queen)
- Saft el-Hinna
- Sah (god)
- Sahure
- Sail (hieroglyph)
- Sais, Egypt
- Saite Oracle Papyrus
- Sakha, Egypt
- Sakir-Har
- SAK S 3
- Sakuji Yoshimura
- Salima Ikram
- Salitis
- Sally Katary
- Salomo of Makuria
- Samannud
- Sami Gabra
- Samuel Birch (Egyptologist)
- Samuel Sharpe (scholar)
- Sanakht
- Sandal-bearer
- Sankhenre Sewadjtu
- Saqiyah
- Saqqara Bird
- Saqqara ostracon
- Saqqara Tablet
- Saqqara
- Sarah Israelit Groll
- Sarah Parcak
- Sara Yorke Stevenson
- Sarcophagus of Seti I
- Sarcophagus
- Sarenput II
- Sarenput I
- Sasobek
- Satatna
- Sathathormeryt
- Satiah
- Satibarzanes
- Satis (goddess)
- Šatiya
- Satkhnum
- Satsobek
- Sayala Mace
- Saï
- ScanPyramids
- Scarab (artifact)
- Scarab ring
- Schoenus
- Scopas of Aetolia
- Scorpion II
- Scorpion I
- Scorpion Macehead
- Scribe equipment (hieroglyph)
- Seankhenre Mentuhotepi
- Seankhibtawy Seankhibra
- Sea Peoples
- Season of the Emergence
- Season of the Harvest
- Season of the Inundation
- Sebakh
- Sebat (king's daughter)
- Sebayt
- Sebek-khu Stele
- Sebiumeker
- Sebkay
- Second Achaemenid conquest of Egypt
- Second Dynasty of Egypt
- Second Intermediate Period of Egypt
- Second Prophet of Amun
- Sedeinga pyramids
- Sed Festival
- Sedjefakare Kay Amenemhat VII
- Sedjemnetjeru
- Sedjem
- Sedjes
- Sedment
- Sega (Upper Egypt)
- Segerseni
- Sehebre
- Sehel Island
- Sehener
- Seheqenre Sankhptahi
- Sehetepebreankh-nedjem
- Sehetepibre
- Sehetepkare Intef
- Seked
- Sekhem-ankh-Ptah
- Sekhemib-Perenmaat
- Sekhemkare (vizier)
- Sekhemkare Amenemhat Senebef
- Sekhemkare II
- Sekhemkare
- Sekhemkasedj
- Sekhemkhet
- Sekhemre-Heruhirmaat Intef
- Sekhemre-Wepmaat Intef
- Sekhemrekhutawy Khabaw
- Sekhemre Khutawy Sobekhotep
- Sekhemre Sementawy Djehuty
- Sekhemre Shedwaset
- Sekhemre Wahkhau Rahotep
- Sekhem scepter
- Sekheperenre
- Sekhmet statues
- Sekhmet
- Seleucus (commandant)
- Seleucus, son of Bithys
- Seleucus I Nicator
- Seleucus VII Philometor
- Selim Hassan
- Sematawytefnakht
- Semat
- Sememiah
- Semenkare Nebnuni
- Semenre
- Semerkhet
- Semna (Nubia)
- Semna Despatches
- Semqen
- Senakhtenre Ahmose
- Senankh
- Senbuy
- Seneb (king's son)
- Senebhenaf
- Senebhenas
- Senebi I
- Senebi
- Senebkay
- Senebsen
- Senebsumai
- Senebtisi
- Seneb
- Senedjemib Inti
- Senedjemib Mehi
- Senedj
- Seneferankhre
- Senenmut
- Senet (queen)
- Senetsenebtysy
- Senet
- Senewosret-Ankh (vizier)
- Senewosret-Ankh
- Senimen
- Seni
- Senkamanisken
- Sennedjem (18th Dynasty)
- Sennedjem
- Sennefer (Deir el-Medina)
- Sennefer (treasurer)
- Sennefer
- Senseneb
- Senusret (nomarch)
- Senusret (vizier)
- Senusret III
- Senusret II
- Senusret IV
- Senusret I
- Sepa (god)
- Sepa (priest)
- Sepermeru
- Seqenenre Tao
- Sequence dating
- Serabit el-Khadim
- Serapeum of Alexandria
- Serapeum of Saqqara
- Serapis
- Serdab
- Serefka
- Serekh
- Sergei Ignatov
- Serge Sauneron
- Sergio Donadoni
- Serket
- Serpopard
- Servant in the Place of Truth
- Sesenebnef
- Seshathetep
- Seshat
- Seshemetka
- Seshemnefer III
- Seshemu
- Sesheshet
- Sesostris
- Set (deity)
- Set animal
- Setau
- Setepenre (princess)
- Setepenre
- Seth-Peribsen
- Seth Meribre
- Seti (commander)
- Seti (Viceroy of Kush)
- Seti-Merenptah
- Setibhor
- Seti II
- Seti I
- Setka (prince)
- Setnakhte
- Setne Khamwas and Si-Osire
- Setut
- Seventeenth Dynasty of Egypt
- Seventh Dynasty of Egypt
- Sewadjare Mentuhotep
- Sewadjkare Hori
- Sewadjkare III
- Sewadjkare
- Sewahenre Senebmiu
- Sha-Amun-en-su
- Shabaka Stone
- Shabaka
- Shadoof
- Shai
- Shalfak
- Shanakdakhete
- Sharek
- Sharuhen
- Sharuna
- Shasu
- Shebitku
- Shed (deity)
- Shedeh
- Shedsu-nefertum
- Shedu (ancient Egyptian official)
- Sheikh Abd el-Qurna cache
- Sheikh Abd el-Qurna
- Sheikh Muftah culture
- Shellal
- Shemanefer
- Shemay
- Shendyt
- Sheneh (pharaoh)
- Shen ring
- Shenshek
- Shepenupet II
- Shepenupet I
- Shepseskaf-ankh
- Shepseskaf
- Shepseskare
- Shepset-ipet
- Shepsy
- Sherden
- Sheretnebty
- Shery (Egypt)
- Shesepankhenamen Setepenre
- Sheshi
- Shesmetet
- Shezmu
- Shishak
- Shorkaror
- Shoshenq A
- Shoshenq D
- Shoshenq III
- Shoshenq II
- Shoshenq IV
- Shoshenq I
- Shoshenq Q
- Shoshenq VII
- Shoshenq VI
- Shoshenq V
- Shoshenq
- Shu (god)
- Shunet El Zebib
- Shuroy
- Shuti hieroglyph (two-feather adornment)
- Sia (god)
- Siamun (son of Ahmose I)
- Siamun (son of Thutmose III)
- Siamun
- Siaspiqa
- Siatum
- Side, Turkey
- Sidelock of youth
- Siege of Alexandria (47 BC)
- Siege of Dapur
- Siege of Harran
- Siege of Kimuhu
- Siese the Elder
- Siese the Younger
- Siese
- Sigurd Wettenhovi-Aspa
- Sihathor
- Silvio Curto
- Simmias of Macedon
- Simon of Makuria
- Simut
- Sinja, Sudan
- Siptah
- Sir Herbert Thompson Professor of Egyptology
- Sirius
- Sistrum
- Sitamun
- Sitdjehuti
- Sithathoriunet
- Sithathor
- Sitre In
- Sitre
- Sixteenth Dynasty of Egypt
- Sixth Dynasty of Egypt
- Sky (hieroglyph)
- Slavery in ancient Egypt
- Small Aten Temple
- Smendes III
- Smendes II
- Smendes
- Smenkhkare
- Smiting-blade symbol (hieroglyph)
- Snaaib
- Sneferka
- Sneferukhaf
- Sneferu
- Soba (city)
- Sobekemhat
- Sobekemsaf (13th Dynasty)
- Sobekemsaf (queen)
- Sobekemsaf II
- Sobekemsaf I
- Sobekhotep (mayor of the Faiyum)
- Sobekhotep (Middle Kingdom treasurer)
- Sobekhotep (New Kingdom treasurer)
- Sobekhotep III
- Sobekhotep IV
- Sobekhotep VIII
- Sobeknakht (high steward)
- Sobeknakht (king's daughter)
- Sobeknakht II
- Sobeknakht I
- Sobekneferu
- Sobek
- Sobkou Planitia
- Sogdianus
- Sokar
- Solange Ashby
- Solar barque
- Soleb
- Somers Clarke
- Sonali Gupta
- Sonchis of Sais
- Sopdet
- Sopdu
- Sosibius of Tarentum
- Sothic cycle
- Soul house
- Souls of Pe and Nekhen
- Sources and parallels of the Exodus
- Southern Mazghuna pyramid
- Southern South Saqqara pyramid
- Southern Tomb 11
- Southern Tomb 23
- South Saqqara Stone
- South Tombs Cemetery, Amarna
- Spell of the Twelve Caves
- Speos Artemidos
- Sphinx of Memphis
- Sphinx of Taharqo
- Sphinx water erosion hypothesis
- Sphinx
- Spine with fluid (hieroglyph)
- Spitamenes
- Spithridates
- Stacy Schiff
- Stair-single (hieroglyph)
- Standard Theory (Egyptology)
- Stanley Lane-Poole
- Star shaft
- Statue of Amenemhat III (Berlin)
- Statue of Horemheb and Amenia
- Statue of Metjen
- Statue of official Bes
- Statue of Ramesses II
- Statue of Sekhmet
- Statue of Sobekneferu
- Statues of Amun in the form of a ram protecting King Taharqa
- Statuette of Neferefre
- Statuette of the lady Tiye
- Stelae of Nahr el-Kalb
- Stela of Akhenaten and his family
- Stela of Pasenhor
- Stela of Queen Tetisheri
- Stele of Ankh-ef-en-Khonsu
- Stele of Piye
- Stele
- Stephen Glanville
- Stephen Quirke
- Step pyramid
- Steve Pasek
- Stick shabti
- Stolist
- Stone quarries of ancient Egypt
- Stone vessels in ancient Egypt
- Stork (pharaoh)
- Story of Sinuhe
- Story of Wenamun
- Stuart Tyson Smith
- Studien zur Altägyptischen Kultur
- Subartu
- Sudan
- Suez inscriptions of Darius the Great
- Sumenu
- Sumur (Levant)
- Sun (hieroglyph)
- Sun-rising (hieroglyph)
- Sun Temple of Userkaf
- Supreme Council of Antiquities
- Susanne Bickel
- Šuta
- Suty
- Šuwardata
- Svetlana Berzina
- Swallow (hieroglyph)
- Sydney Hervé Aufrère
- Syrian Wars

== T ==
- T (hieroglyph)
- T. Eric Peet
- T. G. H. James
- Ta-Bitjet
- Ta-Seti
- Ta-wer
- Tabekenamun
- Tabirqo
- Tabiry
- Tabo (Nubia)
- Tadeusz Andrzejewski
- Tadeusz Samuel Smoleński
- Tadibast III
- Tadukhipa
- Taemwadjsy
- Tagi of Ginti
- Taharqa
- Tahmašši
- Tahpanhes
- Tahpenes
- Tahtib
- Taimhotep
- Takabuti
- Takahatenamun
- Takelot III
- Takelot II
- Takelot I
- Takhat (20th dynasty)
- Takhat
- Takhuit
- Takideamani
- Talakhamani
- Talakhidamani
- Talatat
- Tale of the Doomed Prince
- Tale of the Shipwrecked Sailor
- Tale of Two Brothers
- Tale of Woe
- Tamelerdeamani
- Tamos (Egyptian admiral)
- Tanedjemet
- Tanis
- Tantamani
- Tanyidamani
- Tarekeniwal
- Tarkhan (Egypt)
- Tarkhan dress
- Tarrana
- Tashedkhonsu
- Tasian culture
- Tasos Neroutsos
- Tatenen
- Tati (queen)
- Taur Ikhbeineh
- Taurus (ruler)
- Tausret
- Tawerettenru
- Taweret
- Tay (treasurer)
- Tayt
- Tchaenhotep
- Teaching for King Merykara
- Tebtunis archive
- Tebtunis
- Tefibi
- Tefnakht II
- Tefnakht
- Tefnut
- Teka-her
- Tel Habuwa
- Tell el-Balamun
- Tell el-Dab'a
- Tell el-Yahudiyeh Ware
- Tell es-Sakan
- Tem (queen)
- Tempest Stele
- Temple of Aksha
- Temple of Amada
- Temple of Amenhotep IV
- Temple of Amun, Jebel Barkal
- Temple of Beit el-Wali
- Temple of Dakka
- Temple of Debod
- Temple of Dendur
- Temple of Derr
- Temple of Edfu
- Temple of Ellesyia
- Temple of Ezbet Rushdi
- Temple of Gerf Hussein
- Temple of Hibis
- Temple of Kalabsha
- Temple of Khonsu
- Temple of Kom Ombo
- Temple of Maharraqa
- Temple of Montu (Medamud)
- Temple of Mut, Jebel Barkal
- Temple of Ptah (Karnak)
- Temple of Satet
- Temple of Seti I (Abydos)
- Temple of Taffeh
- Temples of Wadi es-Sebua
- Tentamun (18th dynasty)
- Tentamun (20th dynasty)
- Tentamun (21st dynasty)
- Tenth Dynasty of Egypt
- Tentkheta
- Teos of Egypt
- Teqorideamani
- Teriteqas
- Tessarakonteres
- Teti (vizier)
- Teti, Son of Minhotep
- Tetiankhkem
- Tetisheri
- Teti
- Teucer of Babylon
- Tey
- Thalamegos
- Thamphthis
- Tharbis
- Thebaid
- Theban Mapping Project
- Theban Necropolis
- Theban Triad
- Thebes, Egypt
- The Blinding of Truth by Falsehood
- The Contendings of Horus and Seth
- The Eloquent Peasant
- The Greatest Pharaohs
- The Hyksos: A New Investigation
- The Immortality of Writers
- The Indestructibles
- The Land of Foam
- The lion hunts of Amenhotep III during the first ten years of his reign
- The Maxims of Ptahhotep
- The Mummy's Ghost
- The Mummy's Hand
- The Mummy's Tomb
- The Mummy (1932 film)
- The Mummy (1959 film)
- The Mummy (1999 film)
- The Mummy Returns
- The Mystery of the Great Pyramid, Volume 1: Manetho's Papyrus
- The Mystery of the Great Pyramid, Volume 2: The Chamber of Horus
- Theodore M. Davis
- Theodorus, son of Seleucus
- The Prince of Egypt
- The Pyramids of Giza: Facts, Legends and Mysteries
- The Quarrel of Apophis and Seqenenre
- The Ritual of Embalming Papyrus
- The Satire of the Trades
- The Scorpion King
- The Search for Ancient Egypt
- The Seated Scribe
- The Seven Hills
- The Starving of Saqqara
- The Stonemason ostracon
- The Taking of Joppa
- The Valley of the Pharaohs
- The Younger Lady
- Thinis
- Thinite Confederacy
- Third Dynasty of Egypt
- Third Intermediate Period of Egypt
- Thirteenth Dynasty of Egypt
- Thirtieth Dynasty of Egypt
- Thirty-first Dynasty of Egypt
- Thmuis
- Thomas Pettigrew
- Thomas Schneider (Egyptologist)
- Thomas Young (scientist)
- Thoth
- Thout
- Throne Hall of Dongola
- Throne of Princess Sitamun
- Throw stick (hieroglyph)
- Thutmose (18th-dynasty vizier)
- Thutmose (19th-dynasty vizier)
- Thutmose (prince)
- Thutmose (sculptor)
- Thutmose (viceroy of Kush)
- Thutmose III
- Thutmose II
- Thutmose IV
- Thutmose I
- Thutmose
- Thuya
- Théodule Devéria
- Tia (overseer of treasury)
- Tia (princess)
- Tiaa (princess)
- Tiaa (wife of Seti II)
- Tiaa
- Tiberius Julius Alexander
- Timna Valley
- Timosthenes
- Tisethor
- Titus Petronius Secundus
- Tiy-Merenese
- Tiye (20th dynasty)
- Tiye
- Tjahapimu
- Tjan (queen)
- Tjanefer
- Tjaru
- Tjauti (nomarch of Iqer)
- Tjauti
- Tjeker
- Tjenenyet
- Tjesraperet
- Tjetju
- Tjetjy
- Tjuneroy
- Tlepolemus (general)
- Tlepolemus (regent of Egypt)
- Tobi (month)
- Toby Wilkinson
- Tomb A.5
- Tomb A.6
- Tomb A.24
- Tomb ANB
- Tomb C.3
- Tomb C.7
- Tomb C.8
- Tomb C.14
- Tomb CS4
- Tomb D.1
- Tomb of 'Ip
- Tomb of Akhethetep
- Tomb of Aline
- Tomb of Amenhotep II
- Tomb of Antony and Cleopatra
- Tomb of Ay, Amarna
- Tomb of Hetpet
- Tomb of Horemheb in Saqqara
- Tomb of Kha and Merit
- Tomb of Maiherpri
- Tomb of Meryra
- Tomb of Nebamun
- Tomb of Nefertari
- Tomb of Panehsy
- Tomb of Perneb
- Tomb of Ptahmes
- Tomb of Seti I
- Tomb of Thutmose II
- Tomb of Thutmose
- Tomb of Tutankhamun
- Tomb of Two Brothers
- Tomb of Yuya and Thuya
- Tombos (Nubia)
- Tombos Stela
- Tombs of the Nobles (Amarna)
- Tom Hare
- Torgny Säve-Söderbergh
- Townsite-city-region (hieroglyph)
- Trajan's Kiosk
- Transliteration of Ancient Egyptian
- Treasure of El Lahun
- Treasurer (Ancient Egypt)
- Triakontaschoinos
- Tryphaena
- TT1
- TT2
- TT3
- TT4
- TT5
- TT6
- TT7
- TT9 (tomb)
- TT10
- TT11
- TT12
- TT13
- TT14
- TT15
- TT16
- TT17
- TT18
- TT19
- TT20
- TT21
- TT22
- TT23
- TT24
- TT25
- TT26
- TT27
- TT28
- TT29
- TT30
- TT31
- TT32
- TT33 (tomb)
- TT34
- TT35
- TT36
- TT37
- TT38
- TT39
- TT40
- TT41
- TT42
- TT43
- TT44
- TT45
- TT46
- TT47
- TT48
- TT49
- TT50
- TT51
- TT52
- TT55
- TT56
- TT57
- TT58
- TT60
- TT61
- TT62
- TT63
- TT64
- TT65
- TT66
- TT67
- TT68
- TT69
- TT70
- TT71
- TT72
- TT73
- TT77
- TT80
- TT81
- TT82
- TT83
- TT85
- TT88
- TT89
- TT93
- TT95
- TT96
- TT97
- TT99
- TT100
- TT104
- TT106
- TT111
- TT120
- TT121
- TT127
- TT131
- TT133
- TT137
- TT138
- TT147
- TT156
- TT159
- TT164
- TT168
- TT169
- TT170
- TT171
- TT172
- TT174
- TT176
- TT177
- TT178
- TT184
- TT187
- TT188
- TT189
- TT191
- TT192
- TT193
- TT194
- TT195
- TT196
- TT210
- TT211
- TT212
- TT213
- TT214
- TT216
- TT217
- TT218
- TT219
- TT223
- TT226
- TT233 (tomb)
- TT240
- TT250
- TT255
- TT280
- TT282
- TT286
- TT308
- TT311
- TT319
- TT338
- TT340
- TT358
- TT359
- TT374
- TT382
- TT383
- TT385
- TT387
- TT388
- TT390
- TT391
- TT406
- TT407
- TT409
- TT410
- TT411
- TT413
- TT414
- Tulli Papyrus
- Tuna el-Gebel
- Tunip
- Tura, Egypt
- Turin Erotic Papyrus
- Turin King List
- Turin Papyrus Map
- Tushratta
- Tutankhamun's meteoric iron dagger
- Tutankhamun's mummy
- Tutankhamun's trumpets
- Tutankhamun: Enter the Tomb
- Tutankhamun
- Tutenstein
- Tutkheperre Shoshenq
- Tutu (Egyptian god)
- Tutu (Egyptian official)
- Tuya (queen)
- Twelfth Dynasty of Egypt family tree
- Twelfth Dynasty of Egypt
- Twentieth Dynasty of Egypt
- Twenty-eighth Dynasty of Egypt
- Twenty-fifth Dynasty of Egypt family tree
- Twenty-fifth Dynasty of Egypt
- Twenty-first Dynasty of Egypt
- Twenty-fourth Dynasty of Egypt
- Twenty-ninth Dynasty of Egypt
- Twenty-second Dynasty of Egypt
- Twenty-seventh Dynasty of Egypt
- Twenty-sixth Dynasty of Egypt family tree
- Twenty-sixth Dynasty of Egypt
- Twenty-third Dynasty of Egypt
- Two Ladies
- Two whips with shen ring (hieroglyph)
- Tycho Q. Mrsich
- Tyet
- Tyti

== U ==
- Ubaoner
- Udjahorresnet
- Udjebten
- Ukhhotep III
- Ukhhotep II
- Umm El Qa'ab
- Umm Ruweim
- Unas
- Unfinished Northern Pyramid of Zawyet El Aryan
- Unfinished obelisk
- Unfinished Pyramid of Abusir
- Union symbol (hieroglyph)
- University of Michigan Papyrology Collection
- Unlucky Mummy
- Unut
- Upper and Lower Egypt
- Upper Egypt
- Upper Nubia
- Uraeus
- Urbain Bouriant
- Urban planning in ancient Egypt
- Ure mummified cat's head
- Urkunden des ægyptischen Altertums
- Uronarti
- Ursula Hintze
- Usekh collar
- User (nomarch)
- Useramen
- Userhet
- Userkaf
- Userkare
- Usermontu (mummy)
- Usermontu (vizier)
- Usersatet
- Ushabti

== V ==
- Valley of the Golden Mummies
- Valley of the Kings
- Valley of the Queens
- Vasily Struve (historian)
- Veil of Isis
- Veneration of the dead
- Verena Lepper
- Viceroy of Kush
- Victor Loret
- Victor Solkin
- Victory stele of Esarhaddon
- Violette Lafleur
- Vivant Denon
- Vizier (Ancient Egypt)
- Vladimir Golenishchev
- Vladimir Vikentyev
- Voyage d'Egypte et de Nubie
- Vulture crown

== W ==
- Wad ban Naqa
- Wadi al-Jarf
- Wadi el-Hudi
- Wadi Hammamat
- Wadi Maghareh
- Wadi Tumilat
- Wadj (nomarch)
- Wadj-wer
- Wadj amulet
- Wadjenes
- Wadjetrenput
- Wadjet
- Wadjitefni
- Wadjkare
- Wadjmose
- Wafaa El Saddik
- Wah-Sut
- Wahibre Ibiau
- Wahkare Khety
- Wahneferhotep
- Wahtye
- Walls of the Ruler
- Walter Bryan Emery
- Walter Wreszinski
- Warren Royal Dawson
- War of Actium
- Wars of the Delian League
- Wars of the Diadochi
- Was-sceptre
- Wash (pharaoh)
- Washptah
- Water-jugs-in-stand (hieroglyph)
- Waynman Dixon
- Wazad
- Webensenu
- Wegaf
- Wehem Mesut
- Wendjebauendjed
- Weneg (deity)
- Weneg (pharaoh)
- Wenennefer (High Priest of Osiris)
- Wentawat
- Wepemnofret
- Wepset
- Wepwawetemsaf
- Wepwawet
- Werbauba
- Weres
- Werethekau
- Werirni
- Werner Huß
- Werner Vycichl
- Westcar Papyrus
- Western Deffufa
- Wetjes-Hor
- Wetka
- Wḫdw
- White Chapel
- White Pyramid
- Wilbour Papyrus
- Wilhelm Max Müller
- Wilhelm Spiegelberg
- Willeke Wendrich
- Willem Pleyte
- William (hippopotamus figurine)
- William Ayres Ward
- William C. Hayes
- William J. Murnane
- William Kelly Simpson
- William L. Moran
- Will of Naunakhte
- Wiu, Iyu
- Winged sun
- Winifred Blackman
- Winifred Brunton
- Winifred M. Crompton
- Winifred Needler
- Wolfardine von Minutoli
- Wolfgang Helck
- Wolfgang Kosack
- Wolfhart Westendorf
- Wolfram Grajetzki
- Women in ancient Egypt
- Wonderful Ethiopians of the Ancient Cushite Empire
- Wooden tomb model
- Workmen's Village, Amarna
- Workmen's village
- Wosret
- WV22
- WV23
- WV24
- WV25
- WVA

== X ==
- X-Group culture
- Xerxes II
- Xerxes I
- Xia Nai

== Y ==
- Ya'ammu Nubwoserre
- Yabitiri
- Yakareb
- Yakbim Sekhaenre
- Yam (god)
- Yanassi
- Yanhamu
- Yantin-'Ammu
- Yapa-Hadda
- Yapahu
- Yaqub-Har
- Year 400 Stela
- Yesebokheamani
- Yidya
- Yosef Ben-Jochannan
- Younger Memnon
- Yuf
- Yuny (viceroy of Kush)
- Yuny
- Yuya
- Yuyu (High Priest of Osiris)

== Z ==
- Zacharias III of Makuria
- Zacharias I of Makuria
- Zahi Hawass bibliography
- Zahi Hawass
- Zakaria Goneim
- Zamonth
- Zannanza
- Zatipy
- Zawyet el-Maiyitin
- Zawyet El Aryan
- Zawyet Umm El Rakham
- Zbigniew Szafrański
- Zbyněk Žába
- Zenon of Kaunos
- Zimredda of Lachish
- Zimredda of Sidon
- Zita (Hittite prince)
- Zoomorphic palette
- Zuma, Sudan
- Zvenigorodsky seal
- Zythum

== Lists ==
- Amarna letters by size
- Ancient Egyptian palettes
- Ancient Egyptian royal consorts
- Ancient Egyptian scribes
- Ancient Egyptian sites
- Ancient Egyptian statuary with amulet necklaces
- Ancient Egyptians
- Ancient Egyptian temples
- Ancient Egyptian towns and cities
- Book of the Dead spells
- Burials in the Valley of the Kings
- Burials in the Valley of the Queens
- Children of Ramesses II
- DNA-tested mummies
- Egyptian castles, forts, fortifications and city walls
- Egyptian deities
- Lists of Egyptian hieroglyphs
- Egyptian hieroglyphs
- Egyptian inventions and discoveries
- Egyptian mummies (officials, nobles, and commoners)
- Egyptian mummies (royalty)
- Egyptian pyramidia
- Egyptian pyramids
- Egyptologists
- Female Egyptologists
- Finds in Egyptian pyramids
- Governors of Roman Egypt
- Historical capitals of Egypt
- MMA Tombs
- Monarchs of Kerma
- Monarchs of Kush
- Museums of Egyptian antiquities
- Museums with Egyptian mummies in their collections
- Obelisks in Rome
- Papyri from ancient Egypt
- Pharaohs deified during lifetime
- Pharaohs
- Portraiture offerings with Ancient Egyptian hieroglyphs
- Theban tombs

== Templates ==
- Module:Ancient Egypt kings
- Amarna Image Map
- Amarna Period
- AncientEgypt-bio-stub
- AncientEgypt-book-stub
- AncientEgypt-stub
- Ancient Egypt dynasties sidebar
- Ancient Egypt graphical timeline
- Ancient Egyptian medicine
- Ancient Egyptian religion footer
- Ancient Egyptian religion
- Ancient Egyptian royal titulary case
- Ancient Egyptian titulary
- Ancient Egypt template list
- Ancient Egypt topics
- Ancient Near East mythology
- Ancient seafaring
- Cleopatra
- Egyptian-myth-stub
- Egyptian hieroglyphic script needed
- Egyptian hieroglyphs navbox
- Egyptian Location
- Egyptian pyramids
- Egyptologist-stub
- Egyptology-journal-stub
- Egyptology-stub
- First Dynasty of Ancient Egypt
- GardinerReference
- Giza
- Hebrew Bible textual variants navigation
- Hebrew script needed
- Hiero/1cartouche
- Hiero/2cartouche
- Hiero/3name
- Hiero/5Fold
- Hiero/cartouche
- Hiero/Serech
- Hiero/serekh
- Hieroglyph-stub
- Hiero
- History of Nubia footer
- History of Nubia
- Infobox deity
- Infobox Egyptian dignitary
- Infobox Egyptian tomb
- Infobox hieroglyphs
- Infobox pharaoh/Golden
- Infobox pharaoh/Nebty
- Infobox pharaoh/Serekh
- Infobox pharaoh
- Karnak Temple
- Kushite Monarchs footer
- Kushite Monarchs
- Kushite religion footer
- Kushite religion
- List of hieroglyphs/gardiner-TOC
- List of hieroglyphs
- Memphis pyramid complex
- Middle Eastern deities
- New Testament papyri
- OxyrhynchusGR-stub
- Oxyrhynchus Papyri Vol. III
- Oxyrhynchus Papyri Vol. II
- Oxyrhynchus Papyri Vol. IV
- Oxyrhynchus Papyri Vol. I
- Oxyrhynchus Papyri Vol. VI
- Oxyrhynchus Papyri Vol. V
- Oxyrhynchus Papyri
- Papyrus-stub
- Papyrus link
- Papyrus
- Pharaohs
- Queens of ancient Egypt
- Ramesses II officials and priests
- Script/Egyptian Hieroglyphs
- Second Dynasty of Ancient Egypt
- Theban Necropolis
- Third Dynasty of Ancient Egypt
- Tutankhamun
- Unicode chart Egyptian Hieroglyphs Extended-A
- Unicode chart Egyptian Hieroglyphs
- User egy-1
- User WikiProject Egyptian religion
- User WP Ancient Egypt/Akhenaten
- User WP Ancient Egypt/Anubis
- User WP Ancient Egypt/Horus
- User WP Ancient Egypt/Isis
- User WP Ancient Egypt/Ra
- User WP Ancient Egypt/Sahure
- User WP Ancient Egypt/Tutankhamun
- User WP Ancient Egypt
- Valley of the kings imagemap
- Valley of the Kings
- Western world
- WhosWhoInAncientEgyptReference
- WikiProject Ancient Egypt

== See also ==
- Outline of ancient Egypt
