= Khay (Nubian official) =

Egyptian official

Khay was an ancient Egyptian official in charge under king Tutankhamun. He was child of the Nursery, but also fan bearer on the Right of the King, troop Commander and overseer of Southern Foreign Lands. The titles provide evidence that he was one of the most important officials in Nubia, that was at this time under Egyptian control. Khay is known from a depiction on a temple wall at Kawa and from his sarcophagus, now in the Egyptian Museum in Cairo. On the temple wall, king Tutankhamun is mentioned too, providing a clear date for the official.
