= Stolist =

In ancient Egypt, a stolist was a person who held the rank of priest and is now understood to have been an adorner of divine images. At some time, stolists belonged to a group or guild known as nekrostolisteis, as is attested to by the archaeological finds of the Siwa Oasis, this particularly being an inscription dating to the 1st century CE.
