= Egyptology Scotland =

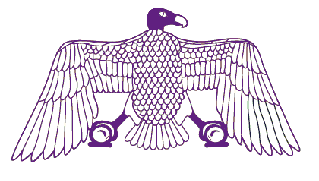
Egyptology Scotland Logo

Egyptology Scotland was formed on 12 December 2000 with the objective of promoting Egyptology, the study and understanding of ancient Egypt, in Scotland. The society holds an annual lecture series, mainly in Glasgow, Edinburgh, and online. Current in-person venues are the Renfield Centre, Bath Street, Glasgow, and the Augustine United Church, George IV Bridge, Edinburgh.

The society's motto is a quote from the ancient Egyptian wisdom text The Instruction of Ptahhotep. It translates as 'Speaking to the future is good – it will listen.'

Egyptology Scotland's annual lecture programme aims to provide members with access to the latest developments in the field of Egyptology and events include group visits, members’ nights and hieroglyph workshops etc. Many notable Egyptologists have spoken to the society over the years. The society newsletter is entitled Scottish Pharaonic.

Egyptology Scotland is the first individual Egyptology society in Scotland although the society is not the first to explore the world of ancient Egypt in Scotland. In 1906, the British School of Archaeology of Egypt, based in University College London established the Egyptian Research Students’ Association. Branches were set up in several cities including in Glasgow and Edinburgh. ‘Lantern lectures’ and ‘demonstrations’ were given and the branches survived on an irregular basis into the 1920s.

== Current leadership ==
- Claire Gilmour, chair
- Dr Bill Manley, honorary president
- Alan Jeffreys, vice chair
