= British school of diffusionism =

Movement that believed ancient Egypt was the source of all human culture

The British school of diffusionism, also known as the Egyptianist school, was an extreme form of the archaeological and anthropological movement of diffusionism. Its main proponents, G. Elliot Smith and William J. Perry believed Ancient Egypt to be the source of all human culture. According to this school of thought, due to the inherent uninventiveness of humans, culture cannot have its origin in every parts of the world. Smith believed that only in ancient Egypt were there favorable enough conditions for the origin of the culture, citing the global distribution of pyramids.
