= Jersey Mummy =

In 1835, John Gosset from Jersey, Channel Islands, took an expedition to Thebes, Egypt, and returned with various artifacts and a mummy (the Jersey Mummy). John Gosset died on the way back in Paris. His father, Isaac Gosset, took over, and brought the mummy to Jersey, where it was housed in a museum in Belmont Road, Saint Helier, along with other Egyptian artifacts, and some Roman and Greek ones as well.

The mummy was dated to around 1069–945 BC. It was thought to be that of a high priestess, but in 1837, it was carefully unwrapped, and found to be that of a middle aged man, early 40s, about 5 ft 5 in.

The museum later closed around 1850, and artifacts were returned to people who had given them for show. Isaac Gosset being dead, the mummy went to a new owner (who the records do not name), presumably the next of kin in the family. He obviously did not care much for a mummy being deposited at his house, because the next we hear about the matter, it is of the mummy having been burnt to ashes somewhere in Longueville, Jersey.

There are a few artifacts left, and these can be seen in the display case at La Hougue Bie, Jersey in the archaeology museum there.

== Sources ==
- Jersey Heritage Report mentioning return on Mummy artefacts to Hougue Bie
- Museum Display Case, Archaeology Section, Hougie Bie, Jersey
