= Nubemtekh =

Daughter of Egyptian king

Nubemtekh was an Ancient Egyptian king's daughter who is known from a number of objects. She lived in the 18th Dynasty and was perhaps the daughter of Thutmosis IV or Amenhotep III.

Nubemtekh is known from several stone cosmetic vessels that were found in the first half of the 19th century and most probably come from Saqqara, where she was perhaps buried. Her only attested title is king's daughter. Her royal father is not known for sure, but he might be Thutmosis IV or Amenhotep III as the style of a stela where she is shown, suggest.

Nubemtekh is depicted on a stela now at the British Museum, belonging to the overseer of the gateway Mehu. The relation between Nubemtekh and Mehu is unknown, but on the stela is also shown a king's son.
