= Weres =

Mummy's-pillow/headrest-themed amulet

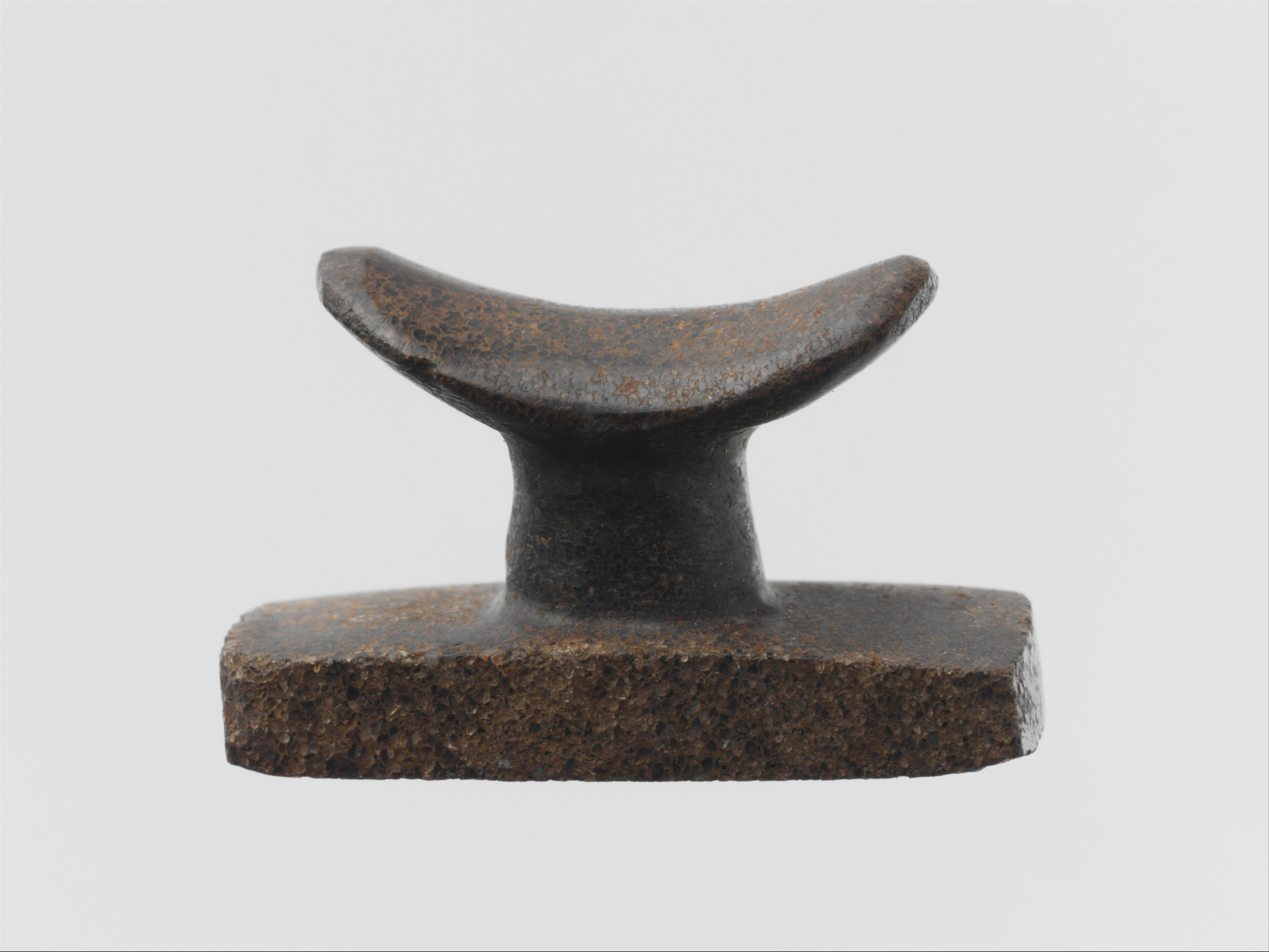
Jasper amulet of a headrest

The Weres was an amulet that symbolically represented the pillow or headrest under the head of an Egyptian mummy. They were placed under the mummy's head to protect it from damage. The Weres amulet was often inscribed with a spell which read: "Their enemies have no power to cut off the heads of the deceased. The deceased shall cut off the heads of their enemies." Weres amulets were sometimes placed in mummy wrappings to magically protect and lift the head of the deceased.

Chapter 125 of the Egyptian Book of the Dead refers to the headrest:

Thou art lifted up, O sick one that lies prostrate. They lift up thy head to the horizon, thou art raised up, and triumphs because of what has been done for thee. Thou art Horus son of Hathor,...who givest back the land after slaughter. Thy head shall not be carried away from thee. Thy head shall never, never be carried away from thee...
