= Danielle Bonneau =

French historian and egyptologist

- Born: 11 January 1912; Noyelles-Godault, France
- Died: 26 October 1992 (aged 80); Paris, France
- Occupation: Papyrologist

Danielle Bonneau (11 January 1912 – 26 October 1992) was a 20th-century French papyrologist. Her work dealt mainly with the floods of the Nile and its supervision by the Greek and Roman administrations of Ancient Egypt. Besides her three books on the subject, she published more than 70 scientific contributions.

== Publications ==
- 1962: Quelques données sur la crue du Nil, in Revue des Études Latines, 39, 1961, (p. 105–111).
- 1964: La crue du Nil, divinité égyptienne, à travers mille ans d'histoire (332 BC.; 641 ap.).
- 1971: Le fisc et le Nil, incidence des irrégularités de la crue du Nil sur la fiscalité foncière dans l'Égypte grecque et romaine.
- 1991: Le sacrifice du porc et Liloïtion en Pactiôn, Association égyptologique Reine Élisabeth.
- 1993: Le régime administratif de l'eau du Nil dans l'Égypte grecque, romaine et byzantine, Leyde, 1993.
