= Henut =

Egyptian queen consort

Henut was an Ancient Egyptian queen with the title king's wife who lived in the 18th Dynasty. Henut is only known from three objects. In the Egyptian Museum in Cairo there is a fragment made of alabaster that belongs to a canopic jar. Here the queen is mentioned and she bears the title king's wife. She appears on the fragment of a wooden fan that was found in tomb WB1 that is located in a side valley, not far away from the Valley of the Kings. Here she bears the titles king's ornament and king's wife. Finally she is known from a cosmetic vessel, where there is only her name preserved. The vessel comes again from WB1. The latter tomb was found heavily looted but must once contained several burials of members of the 18th Dynasty royal family. Her husband is not yet known fror sure, but king Amenhotep III (ruled from about 1386 to 1349 BC) seems likely as most of the burials there belong to his reign.

== Literature ==
- Litherland, Piers (2018). The shaft tombs of Wadi Bairiya, volume I: Preliminary report on the clearance work on the WB1 site by the joint-venture mission of the New Kingdom Research Foundation with the Ministry of Antiquities. New Kingdom Research Foundation, ISBN 978-0-9930973-1-7
