= New Year's bottle =

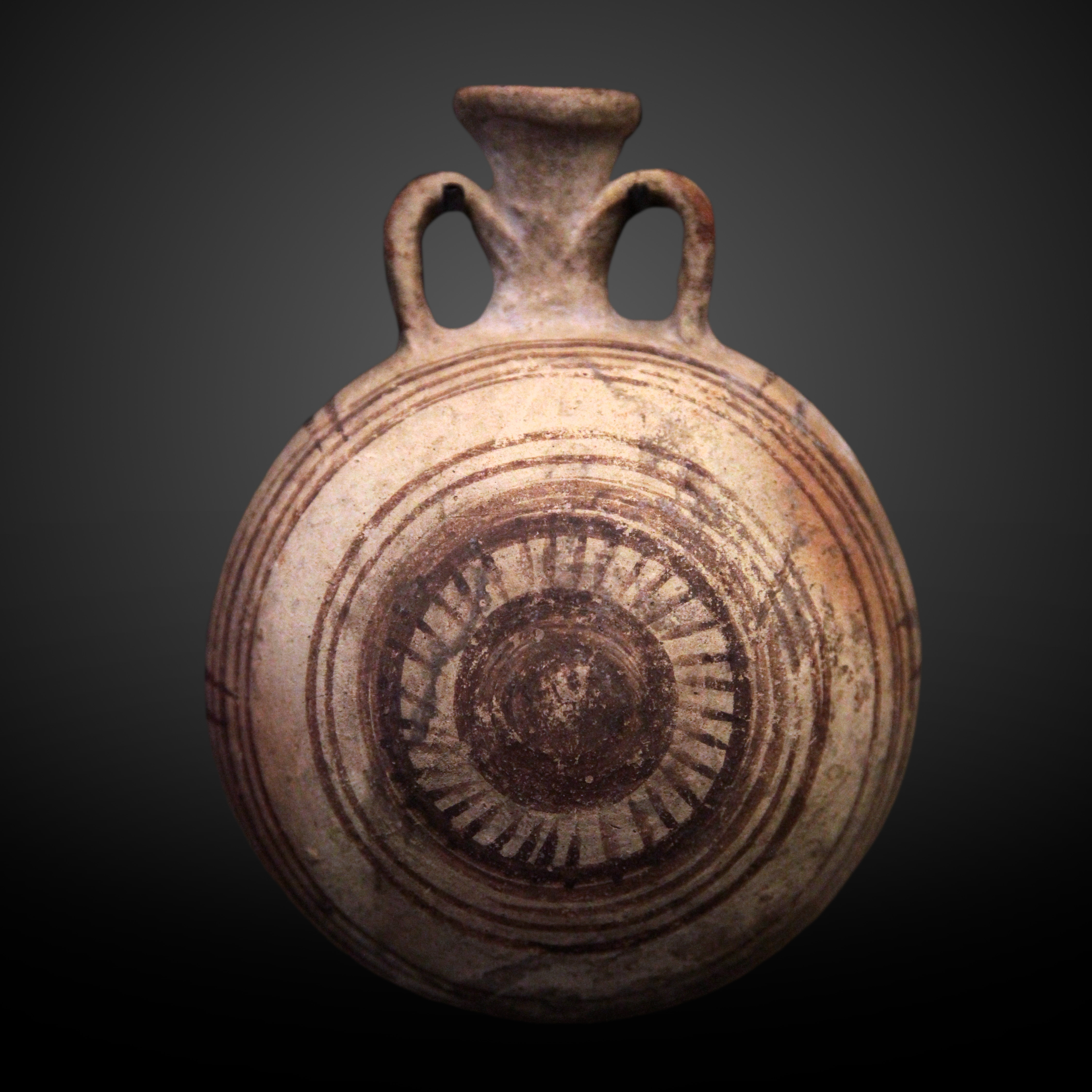
New Year's bottle on display at Musée d'Art et d'Histoire of Geneva.

New Year's bottles, or New Year's flasks, are an archaeological type of lentoid bottles found in the cultures of Ancient Egypt. These bottle were filled with water from the Nile, or possibly with perfume or oil, and offered as celebratory gifts for the New Year. Since the Egyptian New year began at the start of the flood season, offering water from the Nile was a way to symbolise the new cycle.
