= Rahonem =

Egyptian musician

Rahonem (fl. c. 2500 BC) was an Egyptian musician. She was the director of the female singers and tabour (drum) players in her temple.

Rahonem was both the chief woman manager of the lesser wives and director of the female musical performers. She has the same title as that given to the priestess-musician.

== See also ==
- List of women in the Heritage Floor
