= Bakenhori =

bA&k n G5 i A1
Bakenhori
in hieroglyphs
Era: New Kingdom
(1550–1069 BC)

Bakenhori (servant of Horus) was an Ancient Egyptian official who lived under Ramesses II (c. 1303 BC – 1213 BC). He is only known from his decorated rock-cut tomb found in 2022 at Saqqara.

From the inscriptions in his tomb, many of his titles are known. He was true king's scribe, overseer of the wab-priests, lector priest and chief in the funerary workshop (pr-nfr) which is at the sacred place. His wife Taybaket is also mentioned in the tomb. She was songstress of Amun-Re, who is in the island.

The tomb was found in 2022 after heavy rainfalls exposed it. It was excavated, and restoration work was done. It is located north of the tomb of the 26th Dynasty Bakenrenef. The tomb consists of a built-up front part and a back part that is cut into the rocks. The front is an open courtyard with two pillars. At the facade was the entrance to a rock cut chamber that also has two pillars. Most walls are decorated with reliefs, showing Bakenhori and his wife.

== Bibliography ==
Waziri, Moustafa, Mohammad M. Youssef, and Mohamed el-Seaidy (2025). Newly-discovered rock-cut tomb of Bakenhori at Saqqara. in Egyptian Archaeology 66, 42-45
