= Meryaa =

Ancient Egyptian official

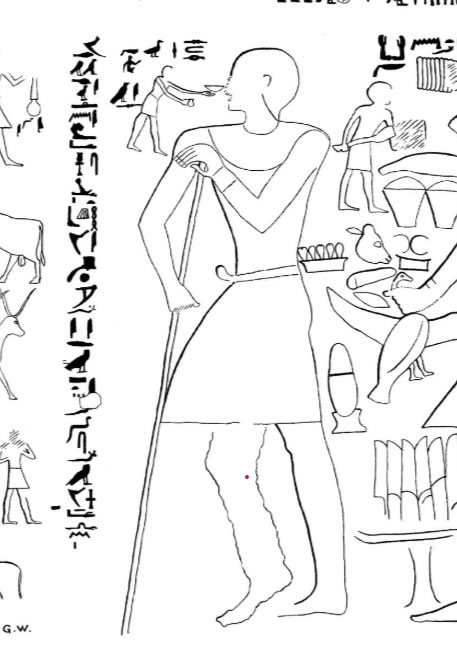
Meryaa on the south wall of his tomb chapel

Meryaa (fl. c. 2200 BC) was an official from Ancient Egypt who lived at the end of the Old Kingdom. He is known from his decorated rock cut tomb at El-Hagarsa.

Meryaa bears in his tomb only three titles. He is mayor (haty-a), lector priest and sole friend.

His tomb consists of the chapel with three rooms and under them, two burial chambers.

The decoration of his small tomb chapel is relatively well preserved. Six wives are depicted in the decoration, as well as several children. On the east wall of the chapel are preserved remains of a biographical inscription.

The tomb was already partly recorded and published by William Flinders Petrie. Later an Australian team under Naguib Kanawati recorded and published the tomb again.

== Literature ==
- Naguib Kanawati (1995): The tombs of El-Hagarsa: Volume III. (= Reports - Australian Centre for Egyptology. Band 7). The Australian Centre for Egyptology, Sydney, ISBN 1-86408-004-3, pp. 25–42, plates 7–17, 33–46.
- W. M. Flinders Petrie (1908): Athribis (= British School of Archaeology in Egypt. Band 14). School of archaeology in Egypt, London, OCLC 162596062, pp. 3–4, plates 6–9 (Digitalisat.).
