= Gebu (high steward) =

- High Steward, Royal Sealer
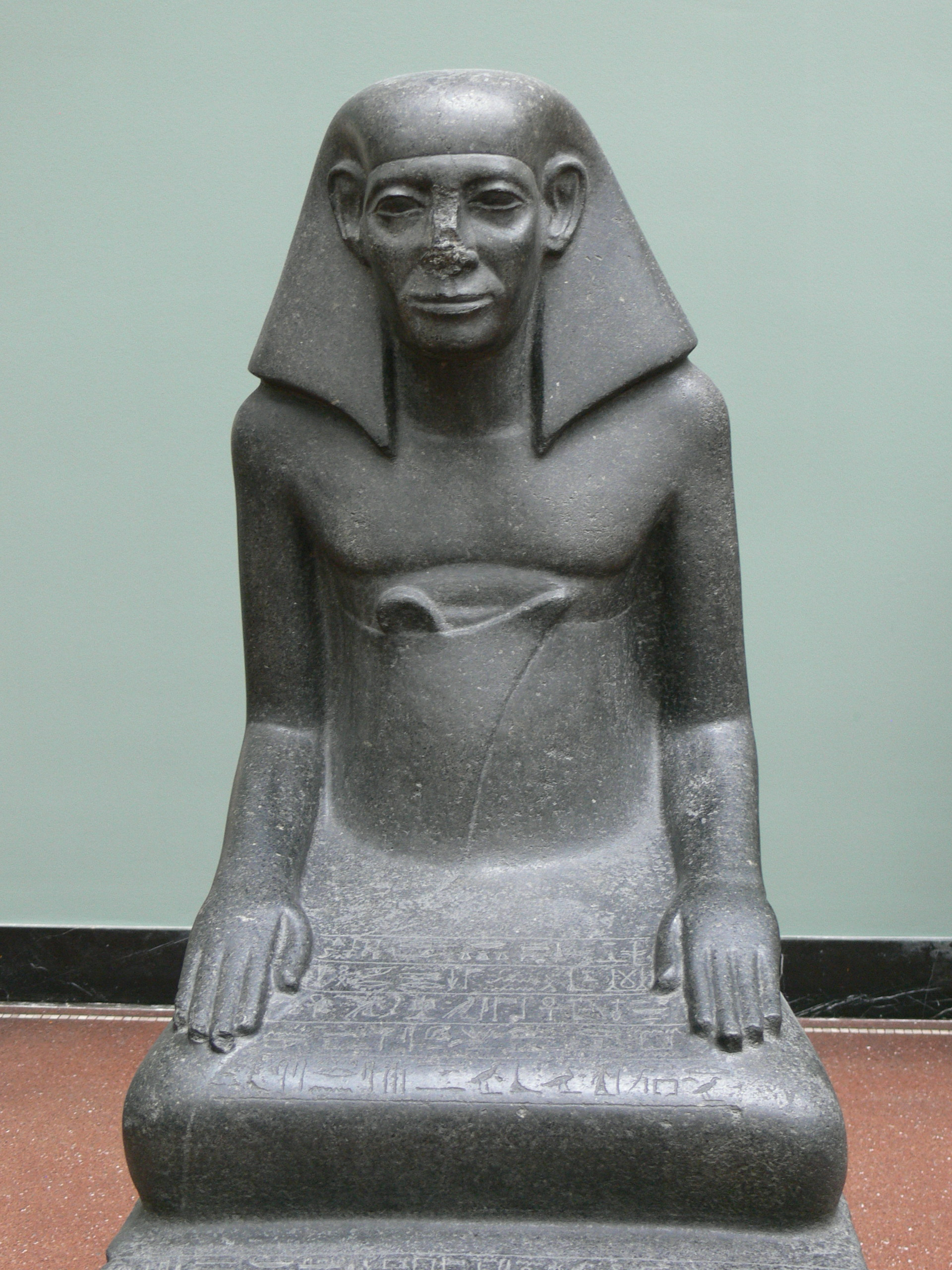
- Statue of the High Steward Gebu in a Cross-Legged Pose
- Dynasty: late Twelfth Dynasty early Thirteenth Dynasty
- Mother: Renesseneb

Gebu (fl. c. 1800 BC) was a high official in Ancient Egypt with the title high steward and royal sealer, during the late Twelfth or early Thirteenth dynasty of the late Middle Kingdom.

== Attestation ==
Gebu is only known from one statue.

At Thebes, a grandorite statue of Gebu sitting with crossed-legs was found in the Temple of Amun at Karnak. Inscriptions show that the statue was a gift from an unnamed king and dedicated to the god Amun. The stylistic features put it to the late Twelfth Dynasty or early Thirteenth Dynasty. His title string was jrj-pꜥt; ḥꜣtj-ꜥ (governor); ḫtmw-bjtj; smr-wꜥtj n mrwt; jmj-rꜣ pr-wr (high steward), gbw (Gebu).

== Literature ==
- Mogens Joergensen: Catalogue Egypt I (3000–1550 B.C.): Ny Carlsberg Glyptotek. Ny Carlsberg Glyptotek, Kopenhagen 1996, ISBN 87-7452-202-7, S. 188–189, Nr. 78.
- Marsha Hill: Statue of the High Steward Gebu in a Cross Legged Pose. In: Adela Oppenheim, Dorothea Arnold, Dieter Arnold, Kei Yamamoto (Hrsg.): Ancient Egypt Transformed, The Middle Kingdom. Yale University Press, New York 2015, ISBN 978-1-58839-564-1, S. 133–134, Nr. 66.
- Marsha Hill: Statue of the High Steward Gebu in a Cross Legged Pose. New York 2015, S. 133.
