= Plummet amulet =

Amulet in the shape of a plumb bob

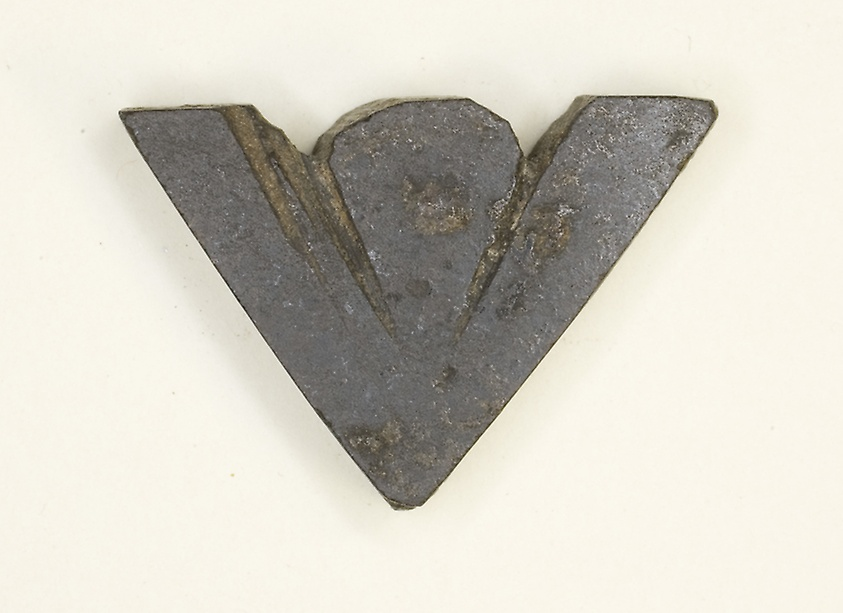
A hematite mason's plummet

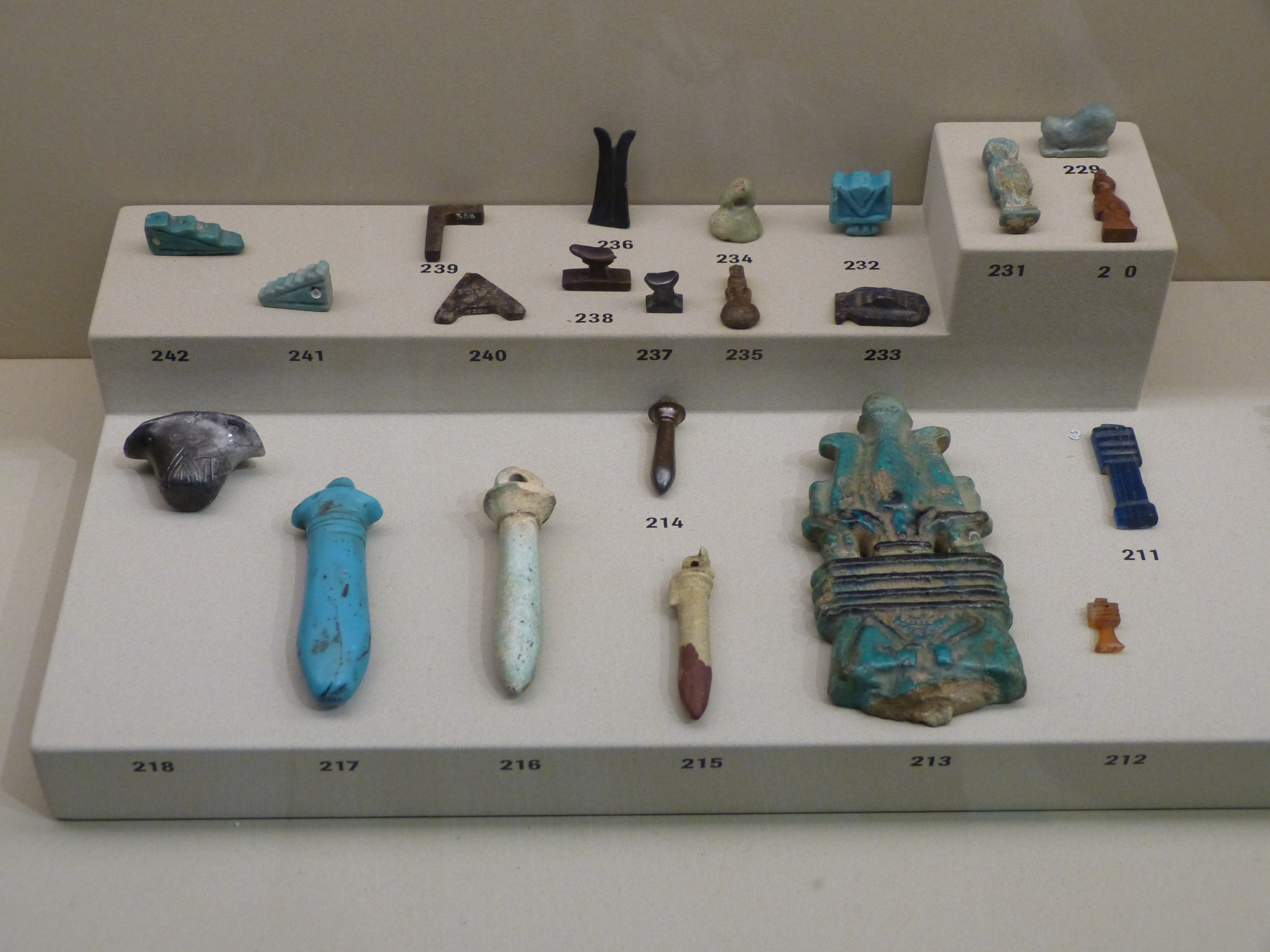
240 is a mason's plummet.

A plummet amulet is an amulet created by Ancient Egyptians in the shape of a plumb bob or plummet.

They included these plummet amulets in the mummification process because they believed it would bring balance to the deceased in their next life.
