= Manfred Cassirer =

British Egyptologist and parapsychologist

Manfred Cassirer (12 July 1920 – 18 December 2003) was a British Egyptologist and parapsychologist.

Cassirer was born in Berlin. Being half-Jewish he moved to Paris to stay with a relative when he was a child. He was psychologically disturbed during his youth. He later moved to Oxford where he studied theology. He obtained a degree in Egyptology and studied at St Peter's College, Oxford.

He was a member of the Society for Psychical Research which he joined in 1975.

== Publications ==
- Parapsychology and the UFO (1988)
- The Persecution of Mr Tony Elms: The Bromley Poltergeist (1993)
- Dimensions of Enchantment: The Mystery of UFO Abductions (1994)
- Close Encounters and Aliens (1994)
- Medium on Trial: The Story of Helen Duncan (1997)
- The Hidden Powers of Nature (2001)
- Miracles of the Bible (2003)
