= Antoni Józef Śmieszek =

Polish Egyptologist (1881–1943)

Antoni Józef Śmieszek (1881–1943) was a Polish Egyptologist and linguist.

Śmieszek studied linguistics and classical philology at the University of Kraków in 1901 and later at the Universities of Munich, Berlin and London. Śmieszek wrote on Egyptian religion and linguistics in Polish periodicals and general collective works. A chair of Egyptology was created for him at Poznań, 1921–1923 and later at Warsaw, 1934–1939.
