= Collection of funerary steles in the National Museum of Brazil =

Brazilian collection of ancient Egyptian funerary steles

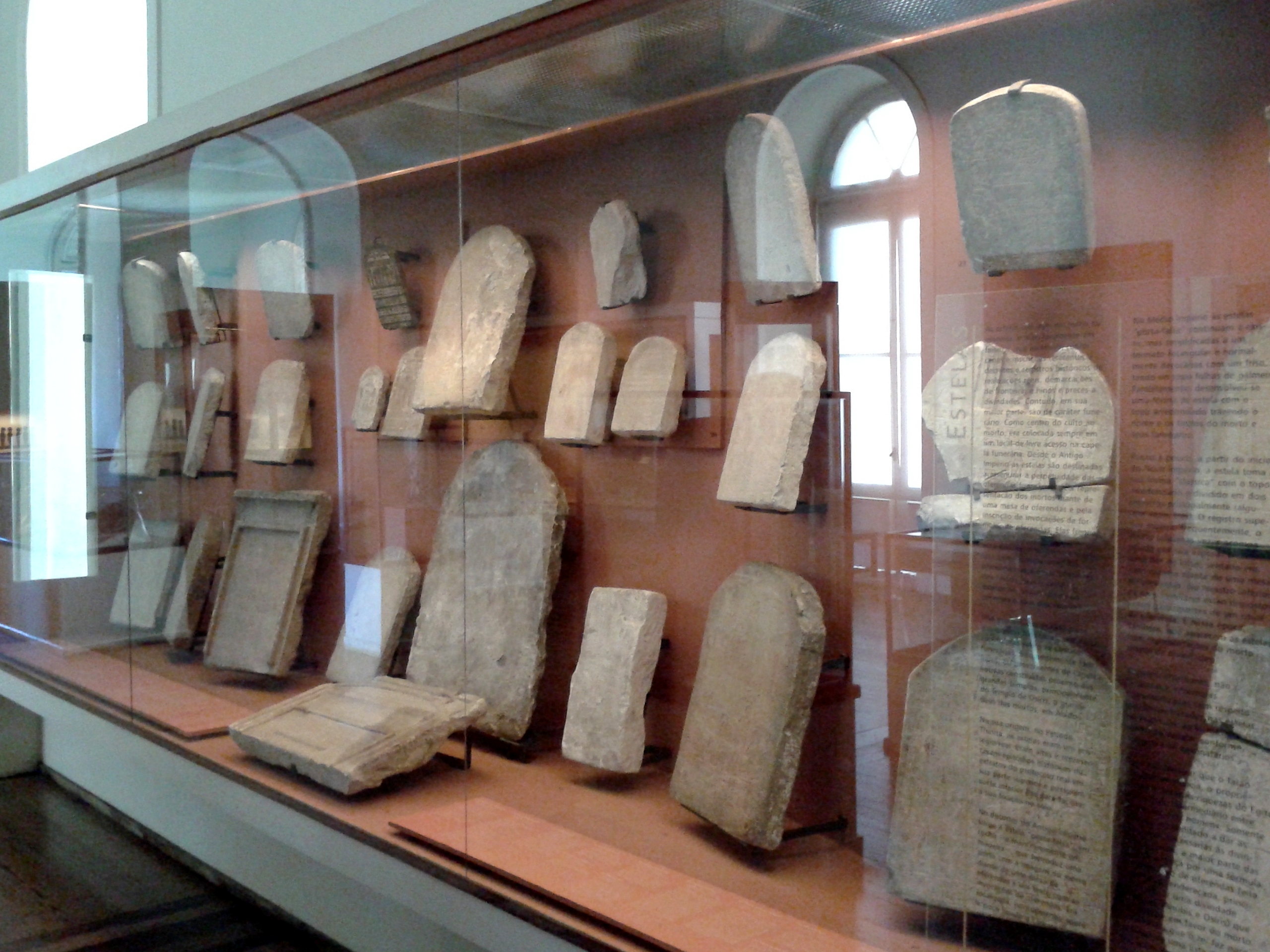
Exhibition of Ancient Egyptian steles in the museum.

The National Museum of Brazil collections include an exhibition of funerary steles from ancient Egypt.

The current status of the collection is unknown after the fire that destroyed the museum in 2018.

Image	Name	Origin	Date	Notes
	First stele of Sahi	Egypt	c. 1991-1668 B.C.	Middle Kingdom, XII/XIII Dynasty.
	Second stele of Sahi	Egypt	c. 1991-1668 B.C.	Middle Kingdom, XII/XIII Dynasty.
	Bas-relief of Sehetepibre	Egypt	c. 1730 B.C.	Middle Kingdom, XIII Dynasty.
	Stele of Seqedi Shemre	Egypt	c. 1991-1668 B.C.	Middle Kingdom, XII/XIII Dynasty.
	Stele of Amenemopet	Egypt	c. 1300-1200 B.C.	XIX Dynasty.
	Stele of Bakenamun	Egypt	c. 1400 B.C.	XII/XIII Dynasty.
	Stele of Djed-Anhurefankh	Egypt	c. 650-550 B.C.	XXVI Dynasty.
	Stele of Haunefer	Egypt	c. 1300-1200 B.C.	XIX Dynasty.
	Stele of Horkefaref and family	Egypt	c. 1991-1668 B.C.	XII/XIII Dynasty.
	Stele of Huy, son of Pahu	Egypt	c. 1290 B.C.	New Kingdom, XIX Dynasty, reign of Seti I.
	Stele of Ithu	Egypt	c. 1300-1200 B.C.	New Kingdom, XIX Dynasty.
	Stele of Mery	Egypt	c. 1991-1668 B.C.	Middle Kingdom, XII/XIII Dynasty.
	Stele of Montusekher	Egypt	c. 1991-1668 B.C.	Middle Kingdom, XII/XIII Dynasty.
	Stele of Nakhtamun	Egypt	c. 1200-1070 B.C.	New Kingdom, XX Dynasty.
	Stele of Pentjek	Egypt	c. 650-400 B.C.	Late Period, XXVI/XXVII Dynasty.
	Stele of Raia	Egypt	c. 1300-1200 B.C.	New Kingdom, XIX Dynasty.
	Stele of Renefankh and his family	Egypt	c. 1991-1668 B.C.	Middle Kingdom, XXI/XIII Dynasty.
	Stele of Ruru, son of Amenemopet	Egypt	c. 600-500 B.C.	Middle Kingdom, XXI/XIII Dynasty.
	Stele of Senusret-Iunefer	Egypt	c. 1897-1878 B.C.	Middle Kingdom, XII Dynasty.
	Unnamed stele	Egypt	c. 600-400 B.C.	XXVI/XXVII Dynasty.
