= Ludmila Matiegková =

Czech archaeologist and Egyptologist

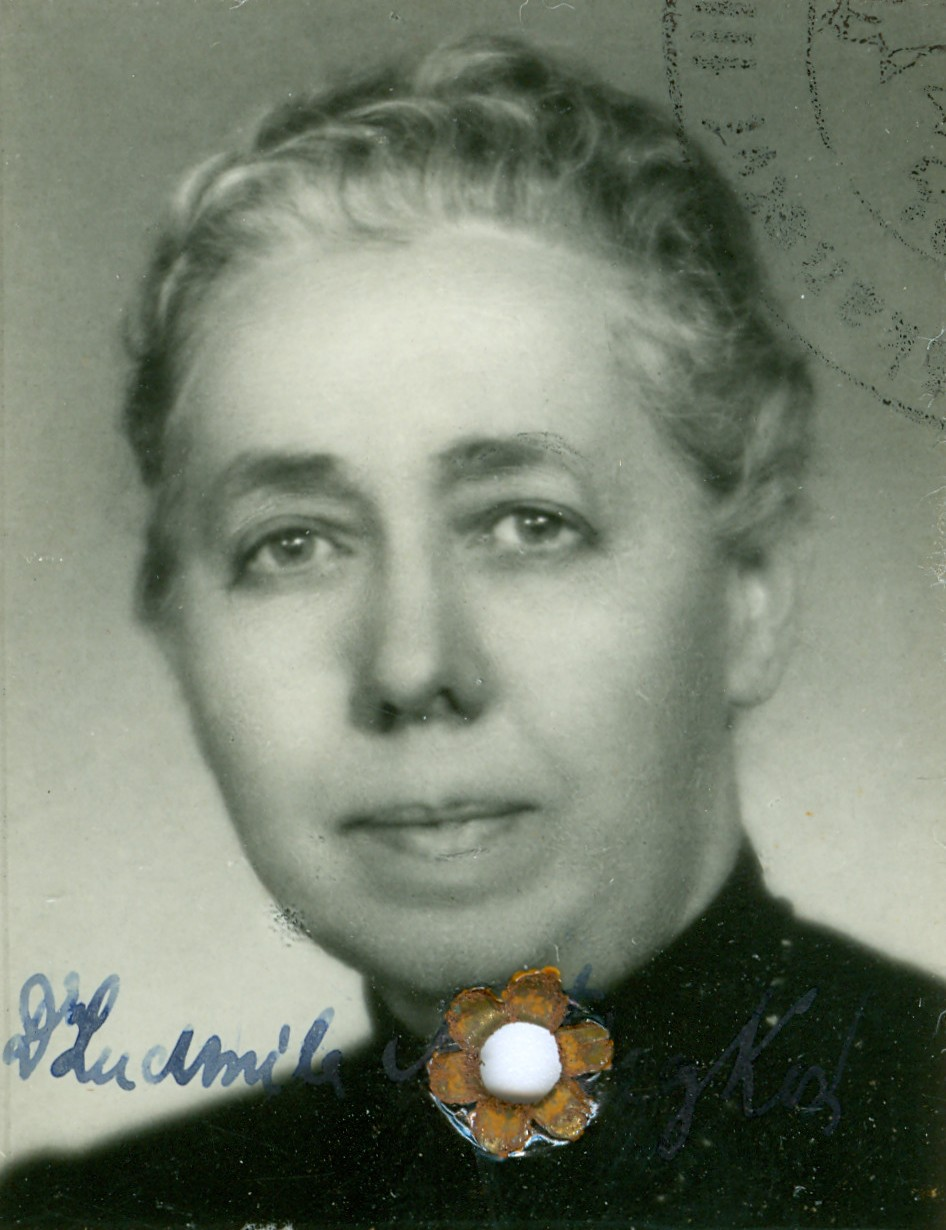
- Born: 9 March 1889; Lovosice, Bohemia, Austria-Hungary
- Died: 26 August 1960 (aged 71); Mariánské Lázně, Czechoslovakia
- Occupations: Archaeologist; Egyptologist

Academic work
- Main interests: Ancient Egypt

Ludmila Matiegková (9 March 1889 – 26 August 1960) was a Czech archaeologist and Egyptologist.

She graduated in Oriental studies from Charles University, where she later worked. She was the first female member of the Oriental Institute, ASCR.

== Publications ==
- 1912. Nová bádání o kamenné době egyptské. Kojetín, Časopis Pravěk.
- 1918. Jak vzniklo písmo Praha, Vilímek.
- 1925. O staroegyptských bozích a hrdinech. Prague: Ústřední nakladatelství a knihkupectví učitelstva českoslovanského.
- 1927. V objetí sfingy.
- 1930. Příběhy bílého oslíka
- 1934. Záhada. Praha.
- 1937. Dítě v starém Egyptě Prague: Institute of Anthropology, Charles University
