= Vladimir Vikentyev =

Russian Egyptologist

Vladimir Mikhailovich Vikentyev (Russian: Владимир Михайлович Викентьев; 6 July 1882 in Kostroma – 1960 in Cairo) was an Egyptologist from the Russian Empire.

He graduated from the Romano-German department of the faculty of Historical philology at Moscow University (1908-1913) with a first class diploma. In 1915 he was hired by the Historical museum named after Tsar Alexander III. In 1922 he went abroad. He taught Egyptian philology and the ancient history of the Near East at Cairo University.
