= Ptahmose =

p t H ms S29 A1
Ptahmose
in hieroglyphs
Era: New Kingdom
(1550–1069 BC)

Ptahmose or Ptahmes may refer to:

- Ptahmose I (High Priest of Ptah), during the time of Thutmose III
- Ptahmose II (High Priest of Ptah), during the time of Thutmose IV
- Ptahmose, son of Menkheper, High Priest of Ptah in Memphis during the time of Thutmose IV and/or Amenhotep III
- Ptahmose, son of Thutmose, High Priest of Ptah in Memphis during the time of Thutmose IV and/or Amenhotep III
- Ptahmose (vizier), High Priest of Amun and Vizier of Upper Egypt, under Amenhotep III
- Ptahmose (treasurer), under Amenhotep III
- Ptahmose, an official under Ramesses II, known for his tomb (see Tomb of Ptahmes)
