= Sabu =

Sabu may refer to:

== Film and comics ==
- Sabu, Japanese name of 1966 Speed Racer's mechanic in original manga and its anime adaptation
- Sabu, 1971 character in Chacha Chaudhary Indian comic books
- Sabu (film), 2002 Japanese period drama directed by Takashi Miike

== Geography ==
- Sabu, Iran, a village in Sistan and Baluchestan Province
- Sabu, Sudan, a village near Rock Art site of Sabu-Jaddi
- Sabu, an island in eastern Indonesia more commonly called Savu

== People ==
- Sabu (c. 3000 BC), son of Egyptian pharaoh Anedjib
- Sabu also called Ibebi (fl. c. 2350 BC), Egyptian High Priest of Ptah
- Sabu also called Kem (fl. c. 2300 BC), High Priest of Ptah
- Sabu also called Tjety (fl. c. 2300 BC), High Priest of Ptah
- Sabu (actor), Indian-American actor Sabu Dastagir (born Selar Sabu) (1924–1963)
- Sabu Cyril (born 1962), Indian film industry art director
- Sabu Martinez (1930–1979), American conguero and percussionist
- Mohamad Sabu (born 1954), Malaysian legislator and Minister of Defense
- Paul Sabu (born 1951), American musician, son of the actor Sabu
- Sabu (director), Japanese filmmaker and actor Hiroyuki Tanaka (born 1964)
- Sabu (wrestler), American professional wrestler Terrance Michael Brunk (1963 or 1964–2025)
- Sabu the Wildman, a ring name of American Samoan wrestler Ulualoaiga Onosai Tuaolo Emelio (1945–2007), better known as Cocoa Samoa
- Dany Sabourin (born 1980), Canadian ice hockey goaltender nicknamed "Sabu"
- Sabu (hacktivist) (born 1983), American computer hacker, co-founder of LulzSec

== Other ==
- Sabu language, spoken on Indonesian island of Savu

== See also ==
- Sabu-Jaddi, Rock Art site in Northern Sudan containing hundreds of Neolithic-era rock panels
- Sabu-sabu, Indonesian name for methamphetamine
- Sabou (disambiguation)
