= Genealogy of Ankhefensekhmet =

Ancient Egyptian relief

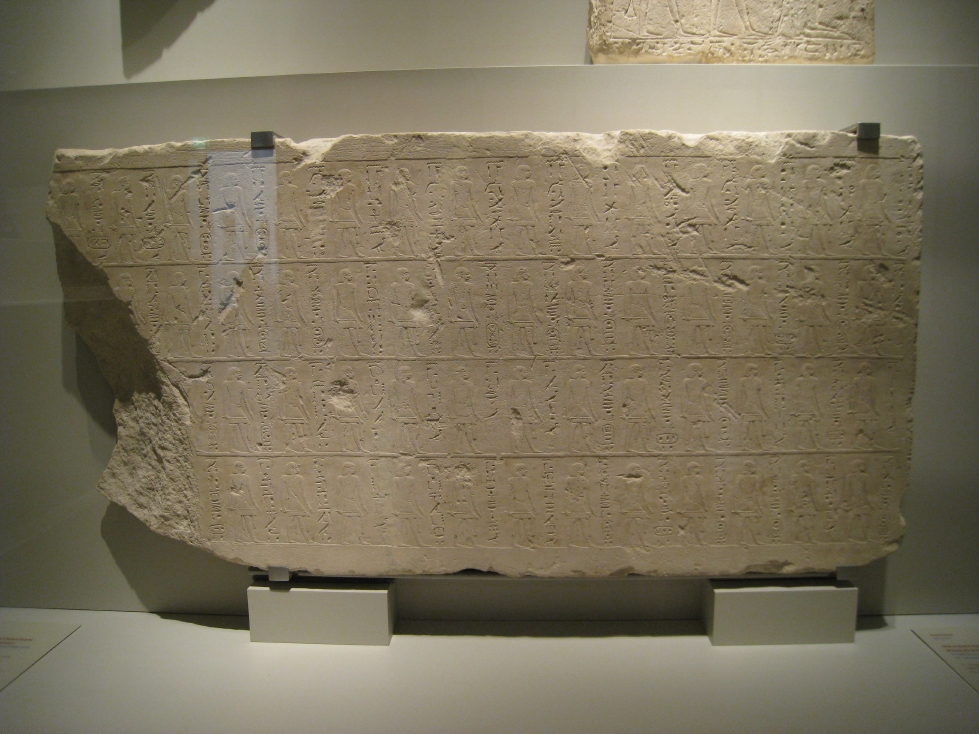
- Material: Limestone
- Size: 90 cm (35 in) x 45 cm (18 in)
- Writing: Ancient Egyptian hieroglyphs
- Created: 8th century BCE
- Discovered: Memphis
- Present location: Egyptian Museum of Berlin
- Identification: 23673

The Genealogy of Ankhefensekhmet or Genealogy of the Memphite priestly elite (Berlin 23673) is an ancient Egyptian relief – sometimes referred to as a stela – normally identified as having been made during the 8th century BCE, under the reign of pharaoh Shoshenq V of the late 22nd Dynasty. A surviving block is kept at the Egyptian Museum of Berlin. The relief was issued by a priest called Ankhefensekhmet with the purpose of illustrating his own genealogy. The relief traces back Ankhefensekhmet's sequence of ancestors up to 64 generations before, with the earliest individual, Ptahemheb, identified by Ritner as being from the time of Nebhepetre (Mentuhotep II) of the 11th Dynasty and alternatively identified by Borchart as being from the time of Nebkaure Khety of the 10th Dynasty. On 25 occasions the genealogy also names the pharaoh or king who was ruling at the time.

Many of Ankhefensekhmet's ancestors bore the title of "Chief of master-craftsmen", more commonly referred as "High Priest of Ptah". Robert K. Ritner suggested that the mention of pharaohs of the Hyksos period (Apepi (3/5), the otherwise unknown Sharek (3/6) and Aaqen (3/12)) should reflect the continuity of the sequence of ancestors, rather than an acceptance of the Hyksos rule by the indigenous people of Egypt; in fact, the name Aaqen, which means "Valiant ass", looks like an intentional misspelling of "Strong of valour". Still earlier, Alan Gardiner also suggested that Aaqen may be a mocking name for Aaqenenre ("Great and strong is Ra"), which is one of Apepi's throne names.

== Text ==
- (1/1) The god's father of Ptah and prophet of Sekhmet, Ankhefensekhmet, son of
- (1/2) the prophet of Sekhmet, Pahemnetjer, son of
- (1/3) the prophet of Sekhmet, Pasherensekhmet, son of
- (1/4) the prophet and chief of secrets of the sanctuary, Pahemnetjer, son of
- (1/5) the prophet [...] in Letopolis, Sisekhmet, son of
- (1/6) the prophet of Sekhmet, Pahemnetjer, son of
- (1/7) the prophet and chief of secrets of the sanctuary, Iweefaenphtah, son of
- (1/8) the prophet and chief of secrets of the sanctuary, Pahemnetjer, son of
- (1/9) the prophet and chief of secrets of the sanctuary, Shedsunefertum, son of
- (1/10) the prophet, Ankhefensekhmet, son of
- (1/11) the chief of secrets of the sanctuary and prophet [...], Ashakhet II, son of
- (1/12) the prophet, Pipi B, in the reign of king Psusennes I, son of
- (1/13) the high priest of Ptah, Horsiese, in the reign of king Psusennes I, son of
- (1/14) the high priest of Ptah, Pipi A, in the reign of king Psusennes I, son of
- (1/15) the high priest of Ptah, Ashakhet I, in the reign of king Amenemnisu, son of [missing block(?)]

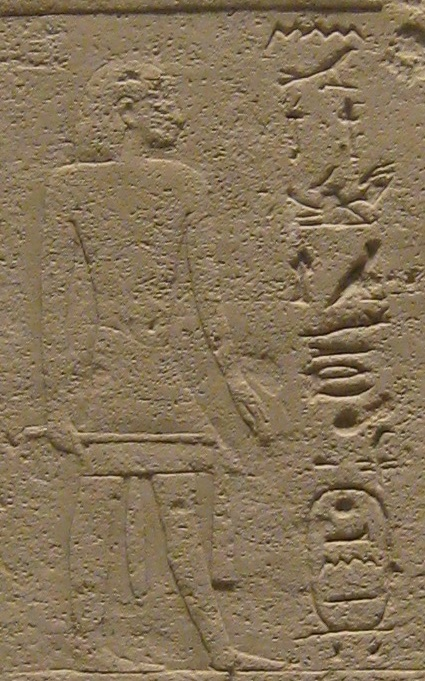
The high priest of Ptah, Sokaremsaf (position 2/7)

- (2/1) the high priest of Ptah, Ptahemakhet, [...]
- (2/2) the high priest of Ptah, Neferronpet, in the reign of king Ramesses II, son of
- (2/3) the high priest of Ptah, Ptahemakhet, in the reign of king Ramesses II, son of
- (2/4) the high priest of Ptah, [...]neshnet, in the reign of king Ramesses II, son of
- (2/5) the god's father of Amun in Karnak, overseer of the works of Ramesses II, Ptahhotep, son of
- (2/6) the high priest of Ptah, Netjerwyhotep, in the reign of king Seti I, son of
- (2/7) the high priest of Ptah, Sokaremsaf, in the reign of king Seti I, son of
- (2/8) the high priest of Ptah, Tiye, in the reign of king Horemheb, son of
- (2/9) the god's father of Amun [in Kar]nak, Sokaremsaf, son of
- (2/10) the god's father of Sekhmet, wab-priest of the king and god's father Ay, Ipu, son of
- (2/11) the high priest of Ptah, Wermer, in the reign of king Amenhotep III, son of
- (2/12) the high priest of Ptah, Pempanebes, in the reign of king Amenhotep III, son of
- (2/13) the god's father and chief of secrets of Ptah, Nehememptah, son of
- (2/14) the setem-priest of Ptah, the chief of seers, in the reign of king Thutmose III, son [missing block(?)]
- (3/1) the god's father, Tiye, son of
- (3/2) the high priest of Ptah, Paimired, in the reign of king Amenhotep I, son of
- (3/3) the god's father and chief of secrets of Ptah, Tiye, son of
- (3/4) the high priest of Ptah, Montu, in the reign of king Ahmose I, son of
- (3/5) the god's father and chief of seers of Heliopolis, Hormaakheru, in the reign of king Apepi, son of
- (3/6) the setem-priest of Ptah, Werhotep, in the reign of king Sharek, son of
- (3/7) the god's father, Horsiese, son of
- (3/8) the god's father, Irmer, son of
- (3/9) the god's father, Kahap, son of
- (3/10) the wab-priest and lector priest, Horemhotep, son of
- (3/11) the god's father and chief of secrets of Ptah, Ptahemhat, son of
- (3/12) the setem-priest of Ptah, Paser, in the reign of king Aaqen, son of
- (3/13) the high priest of Ptah, Sermut(?), in the reign of king Ibi, son [of]
- (3/14) [... son of]
- (3/15) [... son of] [missing block(?)]

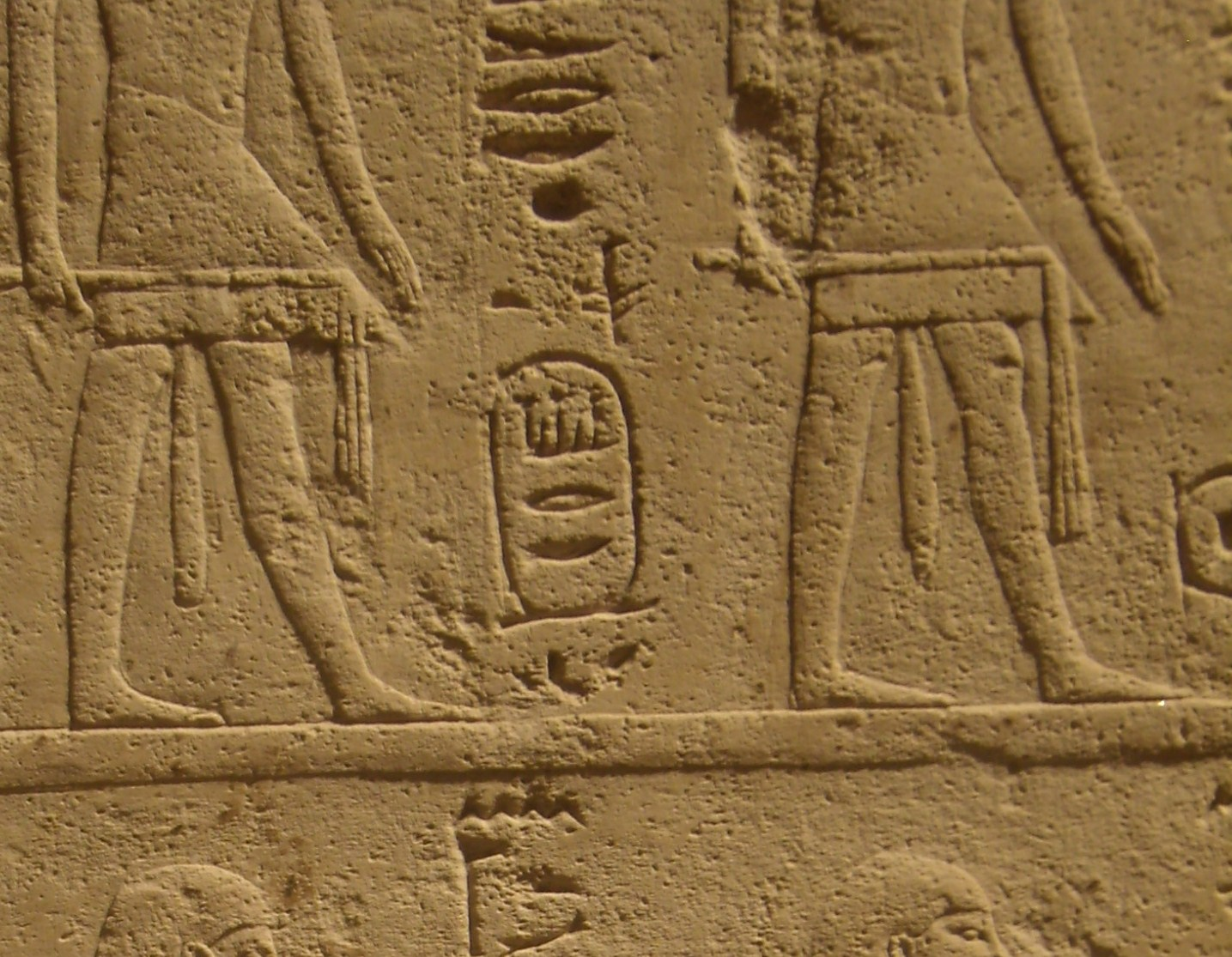
Cartouche of the otherwise unknown Hyksos king Sharek (mentioned in pos. 3/6)

- (4/1) the high priest of Ptah, Wehket, in the reign of king Senusret III, son of
- (4/2) the god's father and prophet of Sobek, Sehetepibseneb, son of
- (4/3) the high priest of Ptah, Nubkaure–ankh, in the reign of king Senusret III, son of
- (4/4) the high priest of Ptah, Khakare–ankh, in the reign of king Amenemhat II, son of
- (4/5) the high priest of Ptah, Sehetepibre–ankh, in the reign of king Senusret I, son of
- (4/6) the god's father, overseer of the city and vizier, Netjerwyhotep, in the reign of king Amenemhat I, son of
- (4/7) the god's father, overseer of craftsmen, and controller of every office of the king, Sokaremheb, son of
- (4/8) [the...and] prophet of Satis lady of Ankhtawy, Nebneferu, son of
- (4/9) the wab-priest and lector priest, Minemheb, son of
- (4/10) the god's father, Ptahhotep, son of
- (4/11) the god's father and chief of secrets of Ptah, Nehemen, son of
- (4/12) the god's father and chief of secrets of Ptah, Minemhat, son of
- (4/13) the high priest of Ptah, Ptahemheb, in the reign of king Mentuhotep II, son [of]
- (4/14) [...son of] [missing block(?)]

== See also ==
- Stela of Pasenhor
