= Pediese =

Pediese, alt. Petiese, Peteese or Padiiset, was the name of a number of high ancient Egyptian officials and noblemen during the first millennium BCE, usually of Libyan descent.

- Pediese (prince in Athribis), around 720s BCE
- Pediese, chief of the Ma and High Priest of Ptah
- Petiese, author of the "Petition of Petiese"
- Pediese, son of Apy, known from a statue usurped by him
