= Ranefer (High Priest of Ptah) =

Ancient Egyptian priest of Ptah

- High Priest of Ptah in Memphis
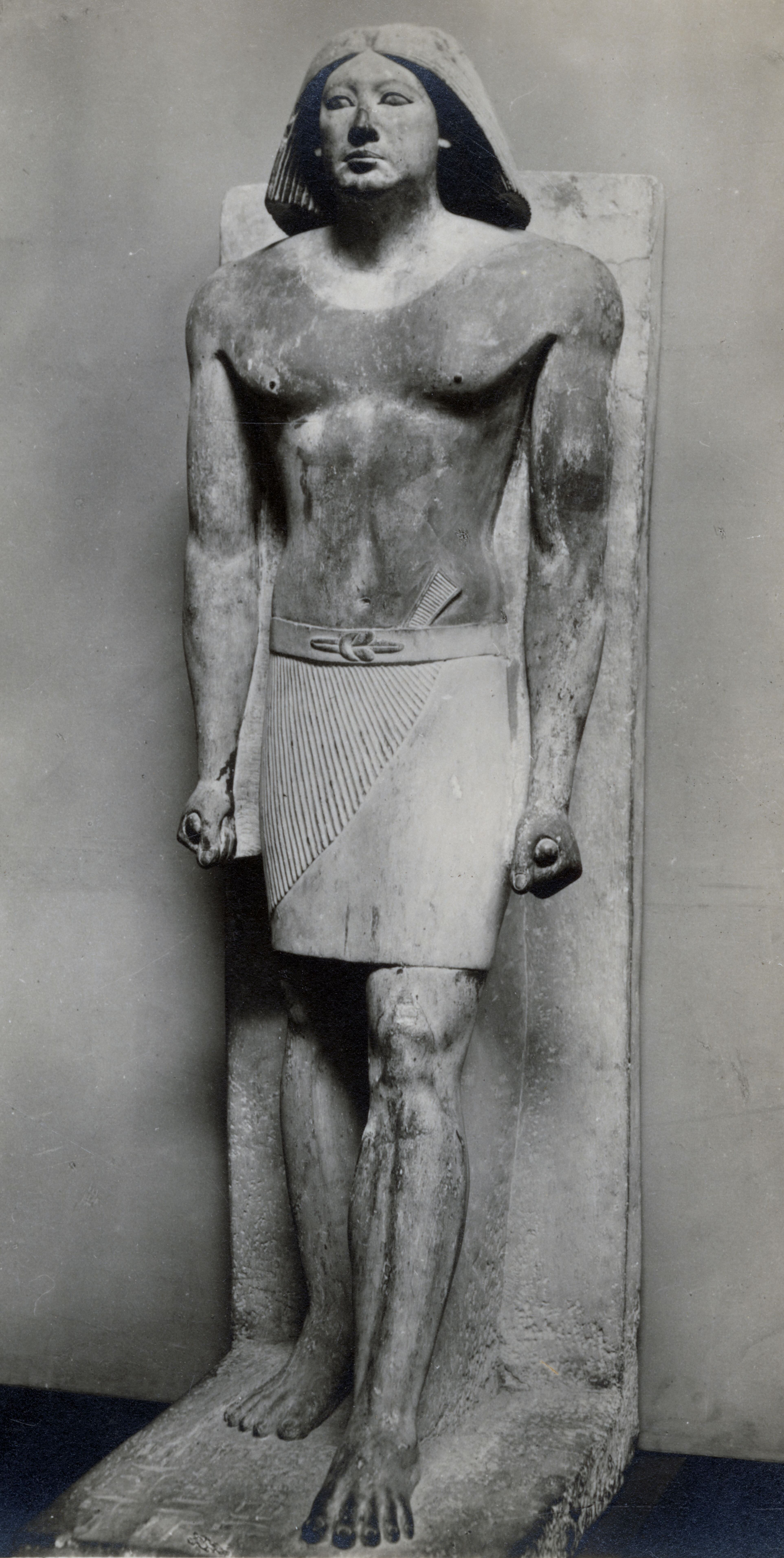
- Statue of Ranefer, High Priest of Ptah, found in his tomb in Saqqara (Cairo CG 19). Egyptian Museum in Cairo. (English)
- Successor: Kanefer
- Dynasty: 4th - 5th Dynasty
- Burial: Saqqara

Ranefer or Ranofer was a High Priest of Ptah, who lived at the end of the Fourth and beginning of the Fifth Dynasty of Ancient Egypt. His name means "Ra is beautiful". His main title was "greatest of the directors of craftsmen belonging to the day of festival". This is a variation of the title normally assigned to the high priest of Ptah.

Ranefer served as a High Priest at the end of the Fourth and the beginning of the Fifth Dynasty. He also was a priest of Seker, steward of Seker (imy-r pr zkr) and priest of Ptah, and was buried in a large mastaba built for himself at Saqqara. In the mastaba was also found the statue of a woman called Hekenu. His name and titles are preserved on two statues discovered in the mastaba. The statues are today in the Egyptian Museum in Cairo.

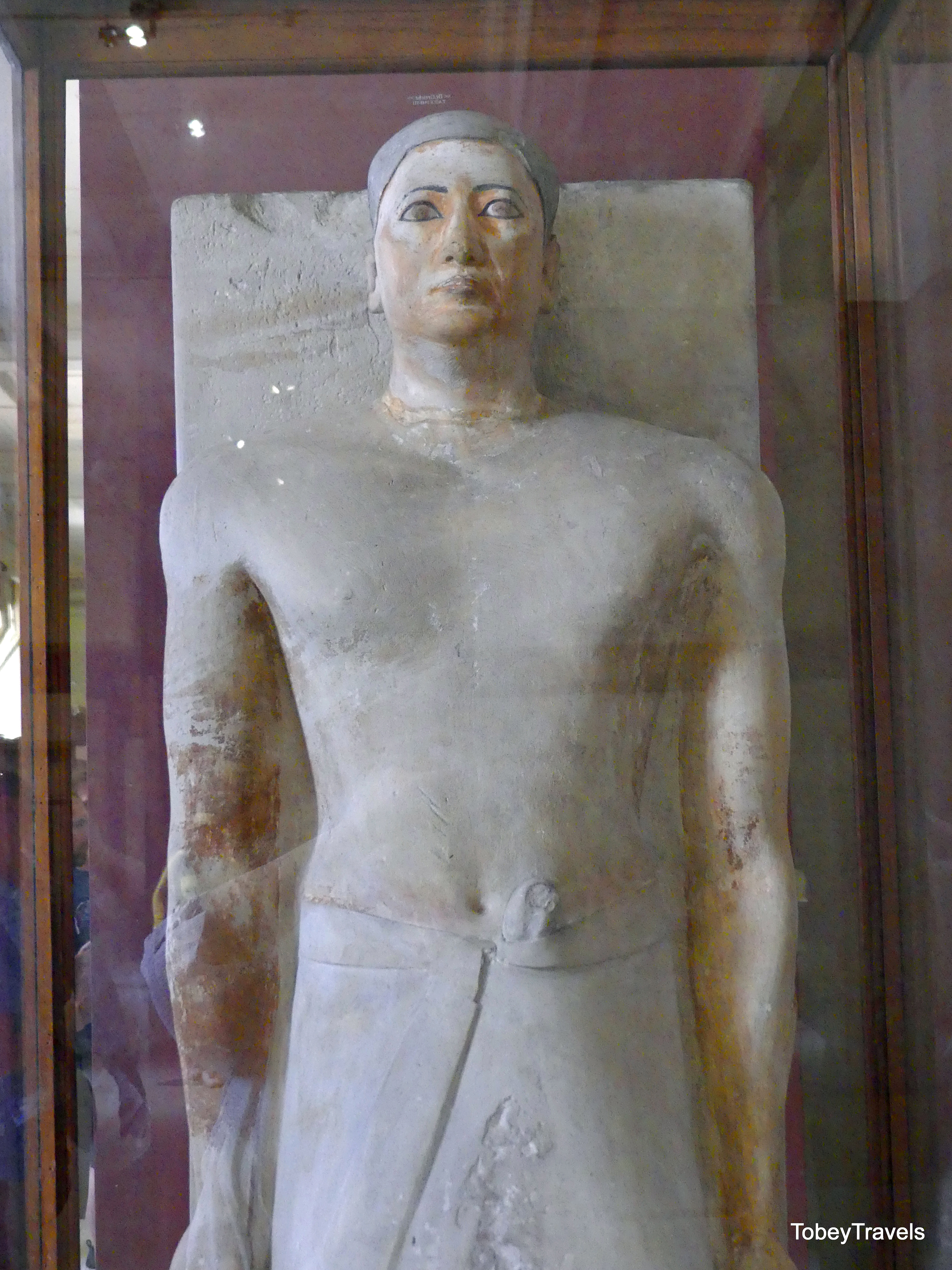
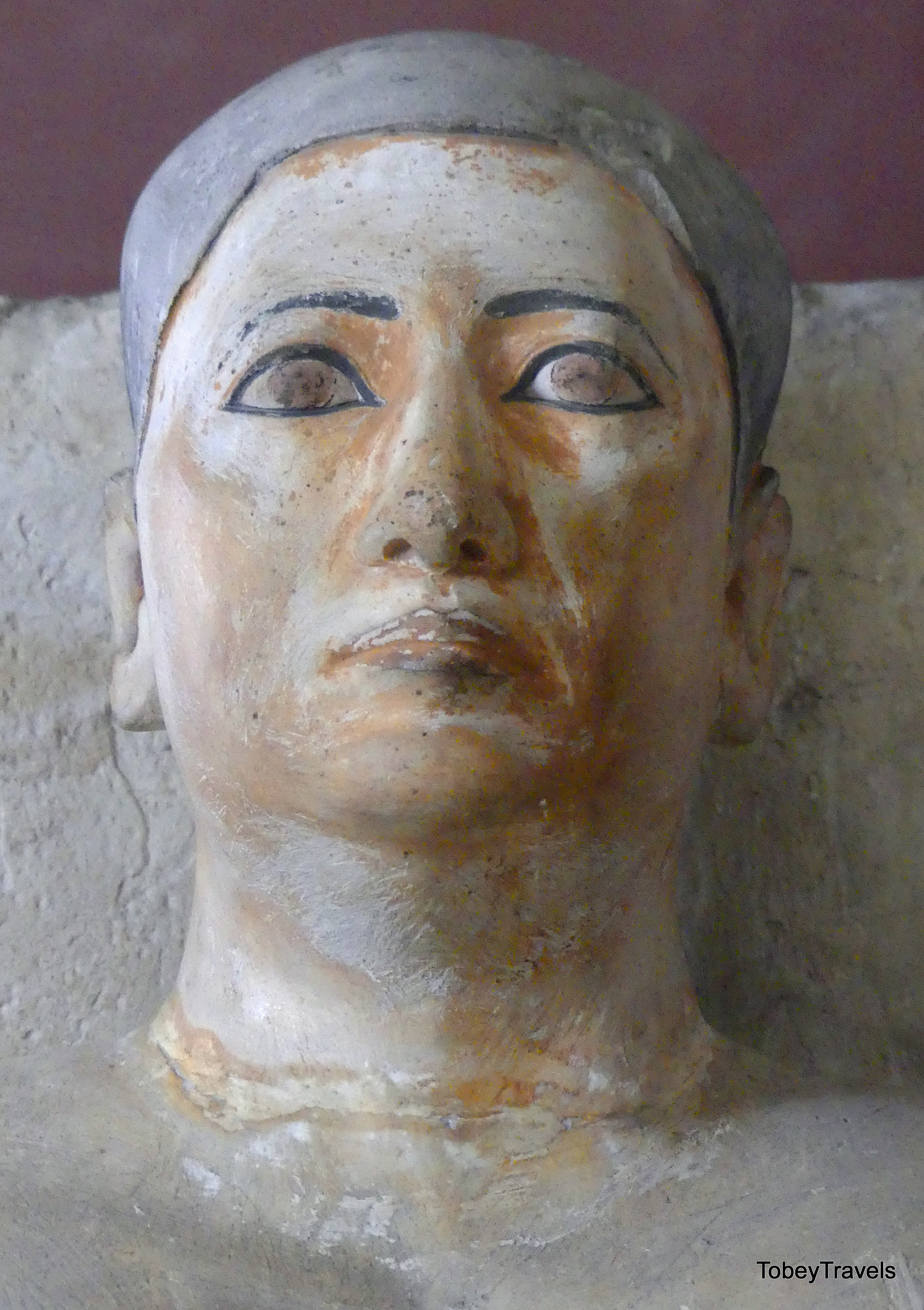
Second statue of Ranofer, Case 224 Egyptian Museum, Cairo
