= Taimhotep =

Ancient Egyptian noblewoman

- priestess of Ptah sistrum player
- Dynasty: Ptolemaic dynasty
- Pharaoh: Ptolemy XII Auletes, Ptolemy XIV, Cleopatra
- Born: Tjaiemhotep; December 17, 73 BCE
- Died: February 15, 42 (aged 30)
- Spouse: Pasherienptah III (m. 60 BCE)
- Father: Khahapi
- Mother: Herankh
- Children: 4 (including 3 daughters and 1 son named Imhotep)

Taimhotep (also known as Tjaiemhotep; December 17, 73 BCE – February 15, 42 BCE) was an ancient Egyptian noblewoman and priestess of Ptah. She was the wife of Pasherinptah III, who was High Priest of Ptah in Memphis. She is primarily known from a large limestone funerary stela that gives a unique detailed autobiography and her reflections on life and death.

== Biography ==
Taimhotep was born on December 17, 73 BCE, corresponding to the 9th regnal year of Ptolemy XII Auletes. Her father, Khahapi, was a sem priest and prophet of Ptah, and her mother, Herankh, was a musician in the temple of Ptah. She had three siblings: a brother, Pasherienamun I, and a sister, Taneferher, who married each other. Her second brother, Horemhotep, was a scribe who personally commissioned the funerary stelae for both Taimhotep and her husband. Taimhotep held the religious titles of Sistrum player and priestess of Ptah.

On July 25, 58 BCE, during the 23rd regnal year of Ptolemy XII, fourteen-year-old Taimhotep married Pasherienptah III, who was 31 years old at the time. The couple had three daughters: Berenice, Herankh, and Her'an. In desire for a male heir, Taimhotep and her husband addressed the deified Imhotep through prayers. According to Taimhotep's stela, they had a son, Imhotep-Pedubast, during the 6th regnal year of Cleopatra VII:

He was born in year 6, day 15 of Epiphi, in the 8th hour of the day, under the majesty of the Queen, the Lady of the Two Lands, Cleopatra, life-prosperity-health ... There was jubilation over him by the people of Memphis. He was given the name Imhotep and was also called Pedibast. Everyone rejoiced over him.

In her stela, Taimhotep laments her untimely death, advising her husband to enjoy his remaining time on Earth. The inscription features a notably bleak perspective on the afterlife, describing it as a state of total darkness where mummies cannot awaken to see their loved ones. This stands out as the only text from Ancient Egypt to explicitly cast doubt on the traditional, idealized conceptions of the afterlife:

The west [the realm of the dead] is a land of sleep. Darkness weighs on the dwelling-place. Those who are there sleep in their mummy-forms. They awake not to see their brothers. They see not their fathers, their mothers, Their hearts forget their wives, their children.

Taimhotep died on February 15, 42 BCE (the 16th day of the 2nd month of Peret in the Julian calendar), during the 10th regnal year of Cleopatra VII. She was 30 years old, passing away four years after the birth of her son in 46 BCE. Funerary inscriptions indicate that her husband survived her by only one year.

Following Pasherienptah III's death, Taimhotep's brother, Pasherienamun I, succeeded him as the High Priest of Ptah, serving from 41 BCE to 39 BCE. Her son, Imhotep, succeeded his uncle as the high priest in 39 BCE at approximately seven or eight years of age. He died in 30 BCE, on the same day that Octavian captured Alexandria.
