= Ashakhet I =

Ancient Egyptian High Priest of Ptah

- High Priest of Ptah in Memphis
- Predecessor: Ptahemakhet
- Successor: Pipi A
- Dynasty: 21st Dynasty
- Pharaoh: Amenemnisu and possibly Psusennes I?
- Children: Pipi A

Ashakhet was a High Priest of Ptah during the beginning 21st Dynasty.

Ashakhet is known from the Genealogy of Ankhefensekhmet, where he is said to be a contemporary of Pharaoh Amenemnisu.

Ashaket was the father of the High Priest of Ptah Pipi A and the grand father of the High Priest of Ptah Harsiese.
