= Thutmose (18th-dynasty vizier) =

Ancient Egyptian vizier

- Vizier of the North
- Dynasty: 18th Dynasty
- Pharaoh: Amenhotep III
- Spouse: Tawy
- Children: Ptahmose, son of Thutmose and Meryptah, son of Thutmose

Thutmose was an ancient Egyptian vizier under Amenhotep III, during the 18th Dynasty.

As vizier of the North (i.e. of Lower Egypt), Thutmose officiated from Memphis, while his southern counterpart was based in Thebes. He was married to Tawy, and had at least two sons: Ptahmose, who became High Priest of Ptah in Memphis, and Meryptah, who later assumed many titles such as prophet and chief steward of the Mortuary Temple of Amenhotep III.

Thutmose is depicted along with his son Ptahmose on a false door-shaped stele now in Florence (inv. 2565). He is mentioned also on a broken stele from Memphis, dedicated to his sons; the two portions of this stele are located in the British Museum and in Leiden respectively.

== Bibliography ==
K. Bosse-Griffiths, "The Memphite Stela of Merptaḥ and Ptaḥmosĕ", The Journal of Egyptian Archaeology, Vol. 41 (Dec., 1955), pp. 56-63.
