= Pipi A =

Ancient Egyptian High Priest of Ptah

- High Priest of Ptah in Memphis
- Predecessor: Ashakhet I
- Successor: Harsiese
- Dynasty: 21st Dynasty
- Pharaoh: Psusennes I
- Father: Ashakhet I
- Children: Harsiese

Pipi A was a High Priest of Ptah during the 21st Dynasty.

Pipi is known from a genealogy known as Berlin 23673, where he is said to be a contemporary of Pharaoh Psusennes I. He is also mentioned in a genealogy from the Louvre. Pipi A was the father of the High Priest of Ptah Harsiese.

== Publications regarding Berlin 23673 and Louvre 96 ==
- L Borchardt, Die Mittel zur Zeitlichen Festlegung von Punkten de Aegyptischen Geschichte und ihre Anwendung, 1935, pg 96-112
- E Chassinat, Recueil de travaux relatifs à la philologie et à l'archéologie égyptiennes et assyriennes, 22 (1900) 16–17, No 54
- Malinine, Posener, Vercoutter, Catalogue des steles de Sérapéum de Memphis, I, 1968, No. 52, pp. 48–49
- Kees, Zeitschrift fur Agyptischer Sprache, 87 (1962), 146-9
