= Ptah-Du-Auu =

Ancient Egyptian priest

- High Priest of Ptah in Memphis
- Dynasty: 4th Dynasty
- Burial: Saqqara

Ptah-Du-Auu was a nobleman and priest in ancient Egypt, who lived during the 4th dynasty. Ptah-Du-Auu was named after the god Ptah, whom he served.

== Biography ==
Ptah-Du-Auu was the first known High Priest of Ptah. His titles were High Priest of the Ka of Ptah and Director of the Craftsmen of the Temple of Ptah of the White Wall.

He was buried at Saqqara. Dominique Mallet excavated his tomb in the late 1960s.
