= Ptahmose, son of Menkheper =

Ancient Egyptian High Priest of Ptah

- High Priest of Ptah in Memphis
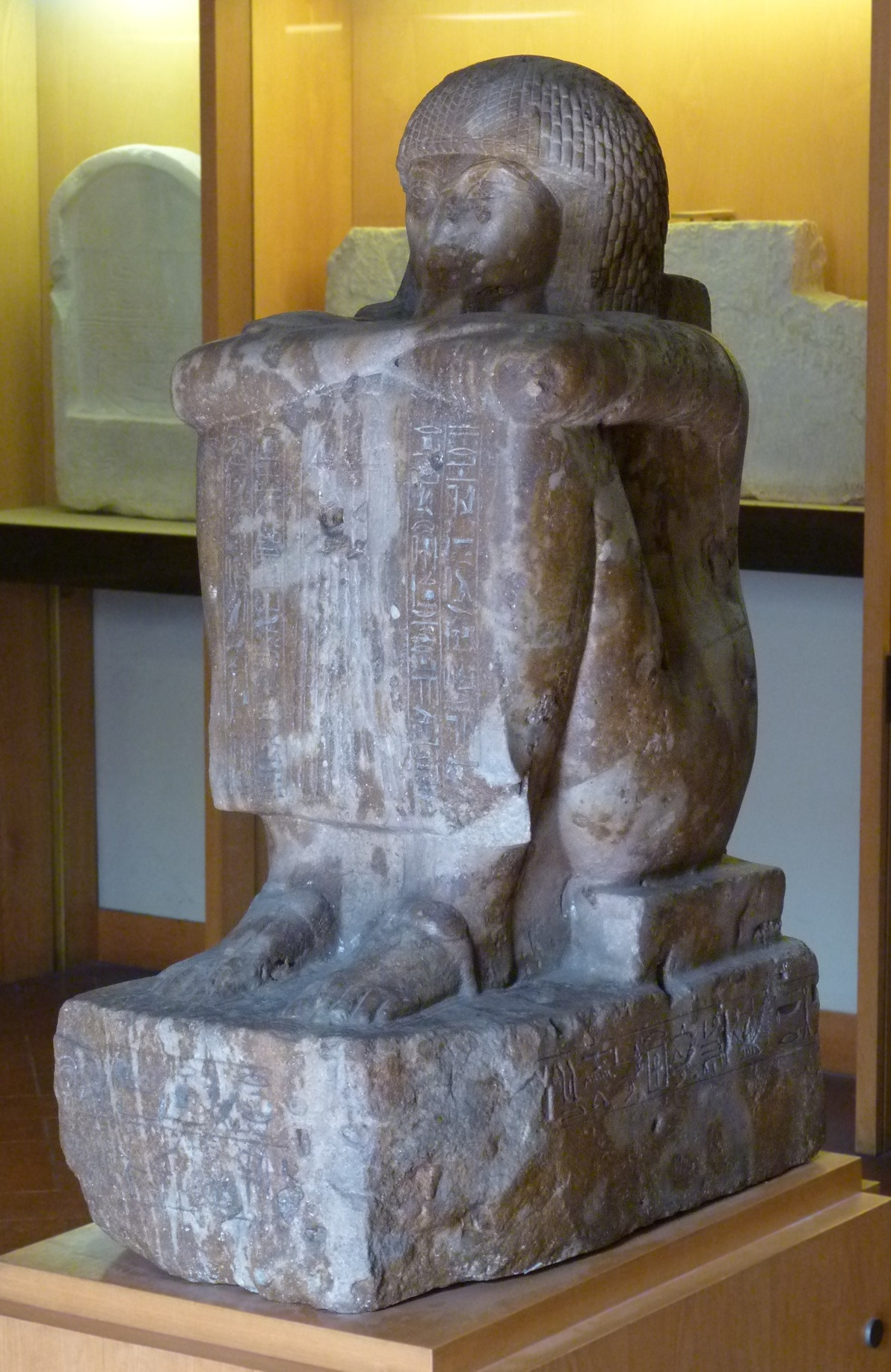
- Ptahmose, son of Menkheper, in Florence.
- Dynasty: 18th Dynasty
- Pharaoh: Amenhotep III
- Father: Menkheper
- Children: Pahonte

Ptahmose was High Priest of Ptah in Memphis during the time of Thutmose IV and/or Amenhotep III. He was the son of a Prophet (priest) named Menkheper. Ptahmose's son Pahonte would later serve as High Priest of Ptah.

Ptahmose is mainly attested by a squatting block statue now in the National Archaeological Museum of Florence (inv. 1790), This statue of Ptahmose is also depicted on Johan Zoffany's painting Tribuna of the Uffizi (1772–78).
Other monuments of Ptahmose are a round topped, limestone stela on which he is mentioned along with the High Priest of Ptah Ptahmose, son of Thutmose and his brother Meryptah, and possibly another small stela, again in Florence (inv. 2537) which may represent either Ptahmose son of Menkheper or Ptahmose son of Thutmose.
