= Ankhefensekhmet =

Ancient Egyptian High Priest of Ptah

- High Priest of Ptah in Memphis
Egyptian name
anx f n sxm x t H8
- Predecessor: Ashakhet II
- Successor: Shedsu-nefertum
- Dynasty: 21st Dynasty
- Pharaoh: Psusennes II? and Shoshenq I?
- Spouse: Tapeshenese, First Chief of the Harem of Ptah and Prophetess of Mut
- Father: Ashakhet II
- Children: Shedsu-nefertum

Ankhefensekhmet (ˁnḫ=f n sḫm.t; "He lives for Sekhmet") was a High Priest of Ptah during the 21st Dynasty in Egypt. He probably served during the reign of Psusennes II and maybe the reign of Shoshenq I.

Ankhefensekhmet is known from a genealogy known as Berlin 23673, which was made by his namesake descendant during the late 22nd Dynasty. On it, he is said to be a prophet (hm nTr). He is also mentioned in a genealogy from the Louvre where he is said to be a High Priest of Ptah.

Ankhefensekhmet is known to have married the Lady Tapeshenese, who served as the First Chief of the Harem of Ptah and Prophetess of Mut. She was the mother of his successor Shedsu-nefertum.

== Bibliography ==
- L. Borchardt, Die Mittel zur Zeitlichen Festlegung von Punkten de Aegyptischen Geschichte und ihre Anwendung, 1935, pg 96-112
- E. Chassinat, Recueil de travaux relatifs à la philologie et à l'archéologie égyptiennes et assyriennes, 22 (1900) 16-17, No 54
- Malinines, Posner, Vercoutter, Catalogue des steles de Sérapéum de Memphis, I, 1968, No. 52, pp. 48–49
- Kees, Zeitschrift fur Agyptischer Sprache, 87 (1962), 146-9
