= Senbuy =

Ancient Egyptian high priest

- High Priest of Ptah in Memphis
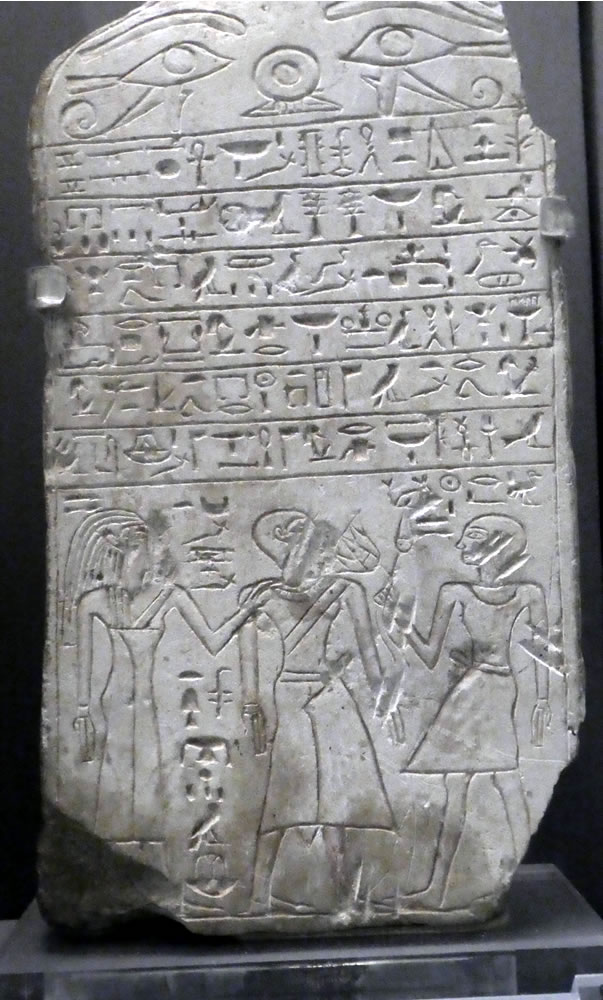
- Stela Cambridge Fitzwilliam Museum E.SS.37
- Dynasty: 12th Dynasty or 13th Dynasty
- Pharaoh: unknown
- Wife: Nubemheb
- Children: Re-Seth
- Burial: unknown

Senbuy was High Priest of Ptah in Memphis during the late Middle Kingdom of Egypt (late Twelfth Dynasty or Thirteenth Dynasty). Senbuy is known from a stela now in the Fitzwilliam Museum in England. Senbuy is depicted with his wife, the king's ornament Nubemheb, and their son Re-Seth. Senbuy's titles on the stela are given as hereditary prince and count, one whose coming to the temple is awaited on the day of the rising of Sothis, the greatest of the directors of craftsmen of the Lord of All, chief priest of his god, the lector-priest.
