= Sabou (disambiguation) =

Sabou is a town in Burkina Faso.

Sabou may also refer to:

== Places ==
- Sabou Department, Burkina Faso
- Asebu, or Sabou, a former Fante chiefdom and town in Ghana

== People ==
- Daniel Sabou (born 1979), Romanian footballer
- Florin Sabou (born 1980), Romanian footballer
- Jiří Sabou (born 1974), Czech footballer
- Marcel Sabou (1965–2025), Romanian footballer
- Samira Sabou (born 1981), Nigerian journalist and blogger

== See also ==
- Sabu (disambiguation)
