= Ptahemhat called Ty =

Ancient Egyptian High priest

- High Priest of Ptah in Memphis
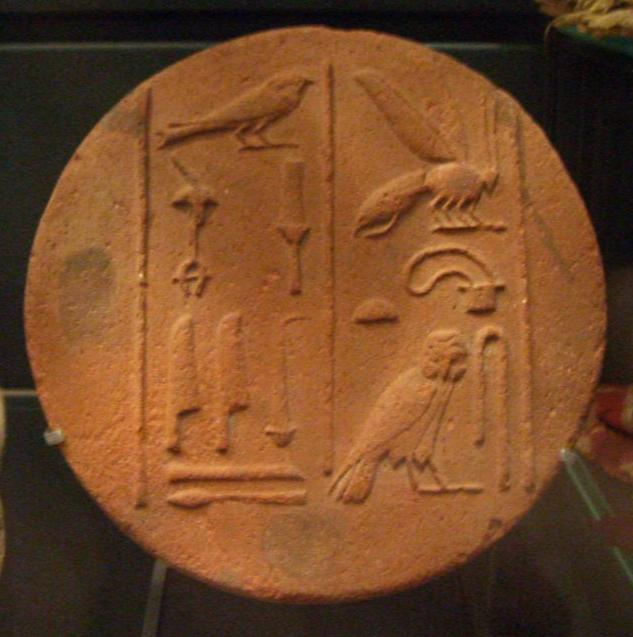
- (base)-Funerary cone of Ty (Ptahemhat), 'Ty, Justified ' (reads right-to-left, Col 2, Col 1)
Egyptian name
U32 i i
- Dynasty: 18th Dynasty
- Pharaoh: Tutankhamen and or Ay
- Burial: Saqqara
- Children: Zay

Ptahemhat called Ty was High Priest of Ptah in Memphis during the time of 18th Dynasty reign of Tutankhamen and/or Ay.

A block of his Saqqara tomb show members of the Egyptian government including Horemheb.

Stela BM 972 which shows the High Priest of Ptah Ptahemhat called Ty receiving offerings from his son Zay, a functionary of the temple of Bastet, was found in the cat necropolis of Saqqara. This may mean that his tomb is located in that general area. His successor in office was most likely Meryptah.
