= Nebpu =

Ancient Egyptian High Priest of Ptah

- High Priest of Ptah
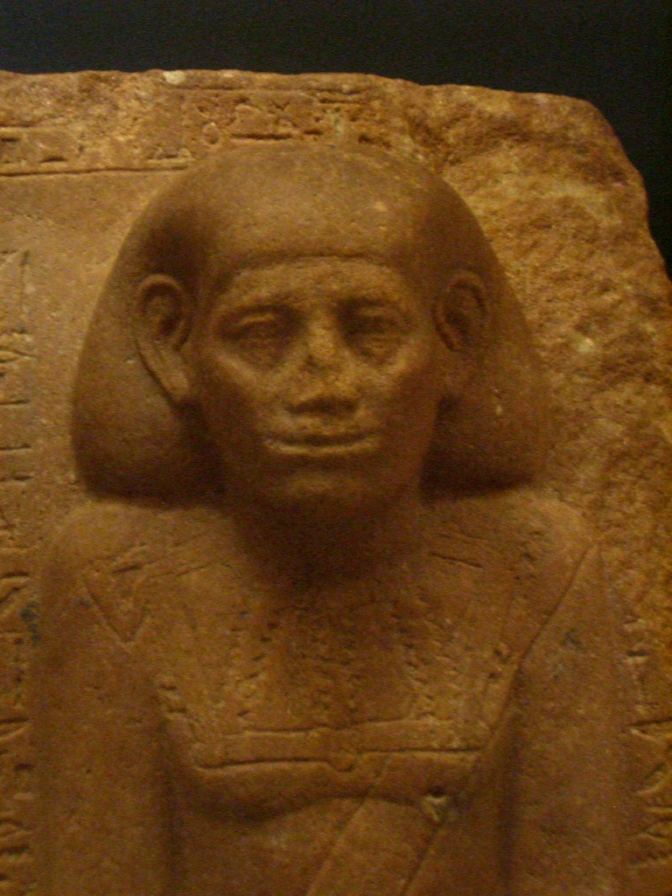
- Closeup of the group statue, showing Nebpu
- Tenure: c. 1840 BC
- Father: Sehetepebreankh-nedjem
- Children: ...hotepibre-shery

Nebpu (fl. c. 1840 BC) served as the High Priest of Ptah at Memphis during the reign of King Amenemhat III in the late 12th Dynasty of Egypt. He was the son and successor in office of Sehetepebreankh-nedjem, who served King Senusret III.

== Attestations ==
In the Louvre Museum (A47), a quartzite group statue shows Sehetepebreankh-nedjem, Nebpu, and a son (...hotepib-shery) which has been damaged, the statue being dedicated by Nebpu to his father and datable by style to the end of the 12th Dynasty. It was bought in 1816.

At Hazor, a fragmentary statue of Nebpu has been found.

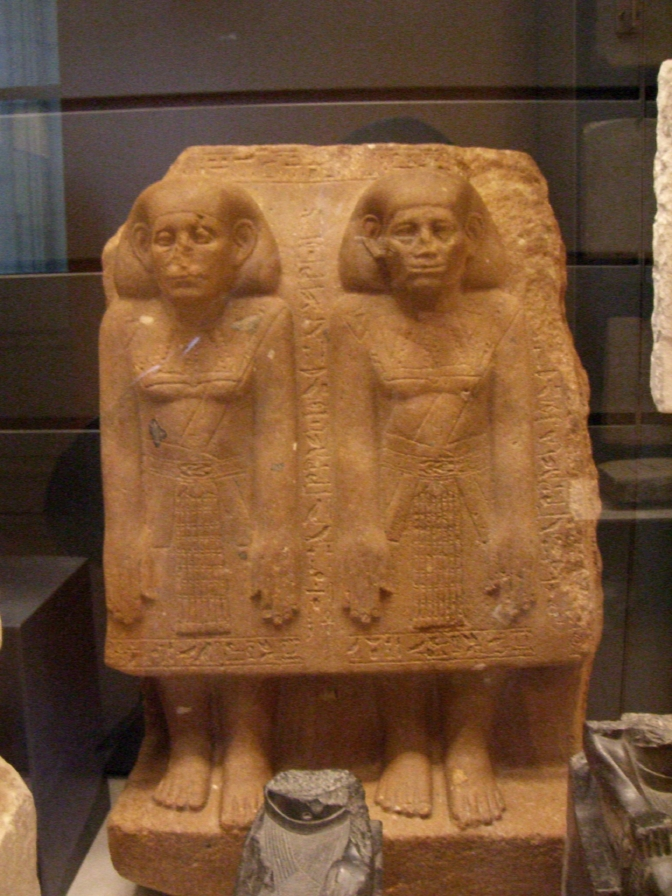
Group statue of Sehotepibreankh-Nedjem (left) and Nebpu (right)
