= Sehetepebreankh-nedjem =

High Priest of Ptah

- High Priest of Ptah; Royal sealer
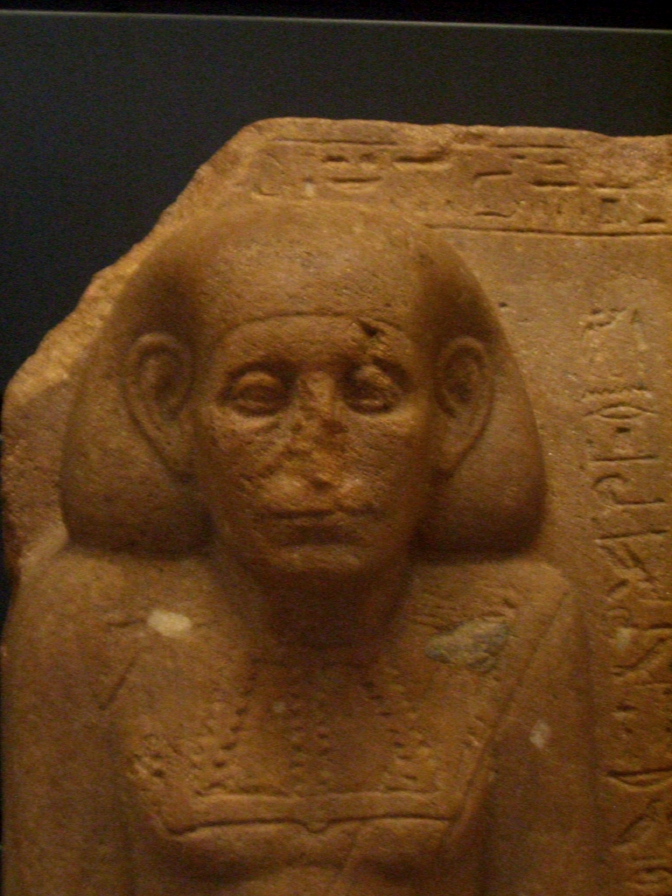
- Head of Sehetepebreankh-nedjem
- Successor: Nebpu
- Dynasty: 12th Dynasty
- Pharaoh: Senusret III
- Burial: unknown
- Father: Uahet
- Children: Nebpu

Sehetepebreankh-nedjem was an ancient Egyptian official with the titles royal sealer, foremost of action, Sem-priest, and Great one of the leaders of craftsmen. The latter title is that of the High Priest of Ptah. The god Ptah was the deity of arts and crafts and therefore, the high priest of Ptah had a title related to crafts. Sehetepebreankh-nedjem is known from a group statue showing him, his son, and his grandson. The statue was dedicated by his son Nebpu, who was also High Priest of Ptah. The statue is datable by style to the end of the 12th Dynasty and is now in the Louvre. The statue was bought in 1816 by the Louvre and is most likely from Memphis. This city was the major cult centre for Ptah.
