= Neterkheperre Meryptah called Pipi II =

Ancient Egyptian High Priest of Ptah

- High Priest of Ptah in Memphis
- Predecessor: Harsiese (High Priest of Ptah)
- Successor: Ashakhet II
- Dynasty: 21st Dynasty
- Pharaoh: Psusennes I, Amenemope, Osochor and Siamun
- Children: Ashakhet II

Neterkheperre Meryptah called Pipi II was a High Priest of Ptah during the 21st Dynasty. He was High priest during the reigns of Psusennes I, Amenemope, Osochor and Siamun.

Pipi II is known from the Genealogy of Ankhefensekhmet, where he is said to be a Prophet (hm nTr) during the time of Pharaoh Psusennes I. He is also mentioned in a genealogy from the Louvre, where he is given the title of High Priest of Ptah.

Pipi II is attested under Siamun on a temple building at Memphis. The gateway of this temple features a lintel mentioning the high priest "Neterkheperre Meryptah who is called Piupiu". The name "Neterkheperre Meryptah" adopted by Pipi II is based on the prenomen of Pharaoh Siamun.
