= Kanefer =

Ancient Egyptian prince and vizier

- Prince of Egypt; Vizier of Egypt
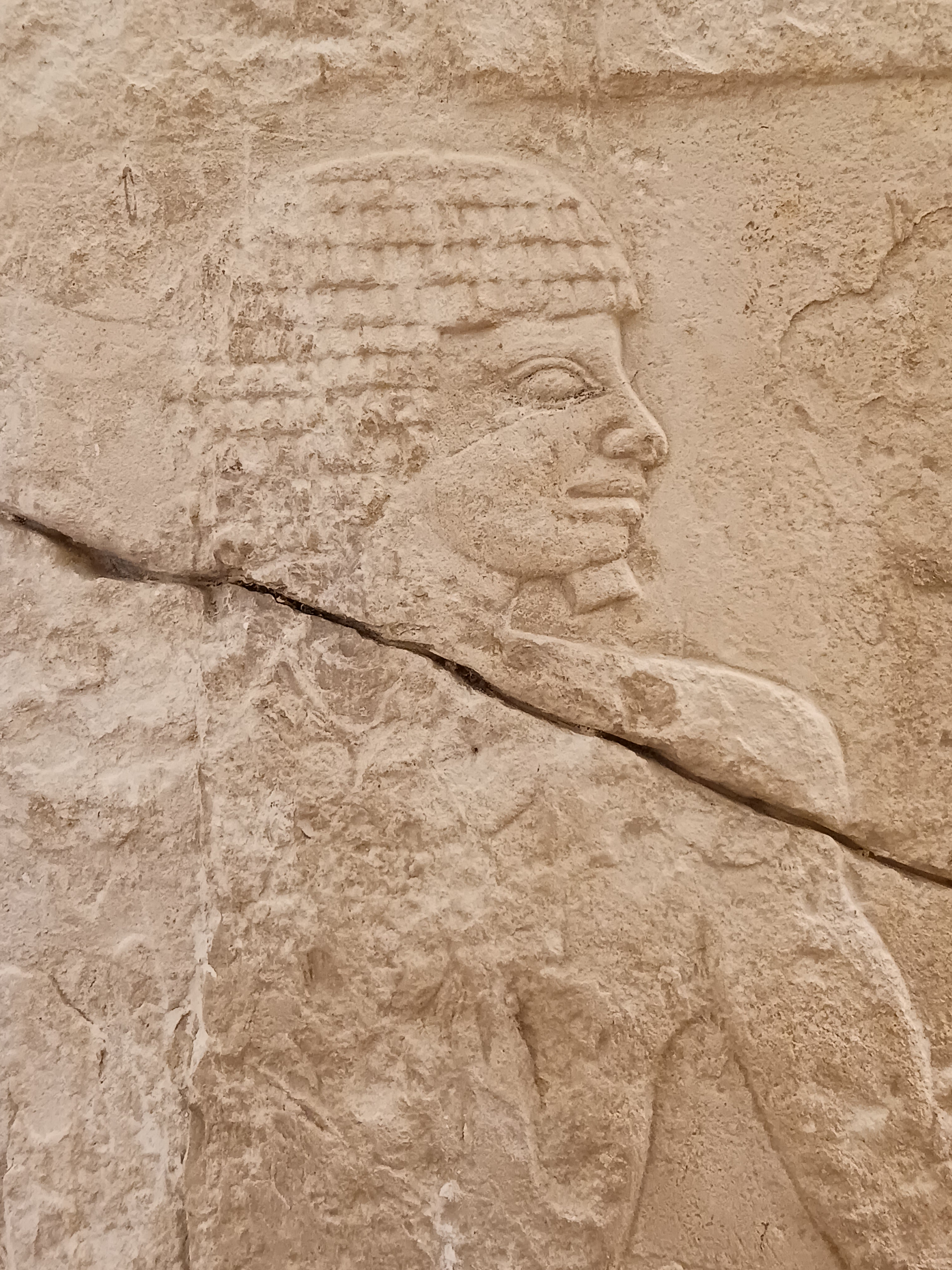
- An individual on the Kanefer stela, 2620-2500 BCE, Dahshur, Louvre
Egyptian name
sw t zA A20 n mi t x r t f kA A nfr
- Burial: Dahshur
- Spouse: Khouenso, Priestess Hator, Lady of the Sycamor
- Father: Sneferu
- Children: Kaiwareb; Kanefer; Meresankh

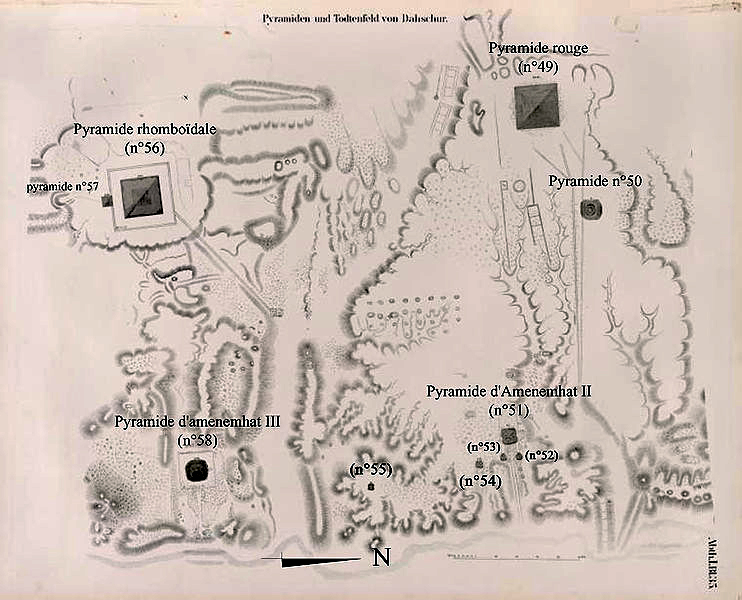
Dahsuhr's necropolis map by Karl Richard Lepsius that shows the location of the Bent Pyramid(no.56) and Red Pyramid(no.49).

Kanefer ( K3=(j).-nfr(.w) My Ka is beautiful") is the name of a prince and King Sneferu's son, who took the vizier's office from his older brother Nefermaat. He lived in the late period of the King Sneferu's reign and possibly in early reign phase of his brother Khufu. Later on, the office of vizier passed to the Nefermat's son Hemiunu. The fourth dynasty was a period when constructions on the Giza plateau peaked, as well as the development of activity of craftsmen and system organisation of grandiose buildings. Kanefer was buried in mastaba No.28 at the Dahshur necropolis. Information about his personality and position of power drawn from the remains uncovered in the mastaba is in question.

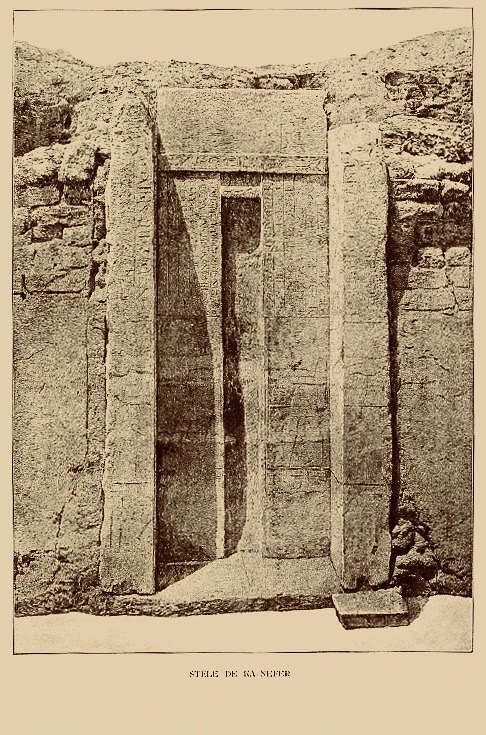
Stele Kanefer, mastaba Dahshur

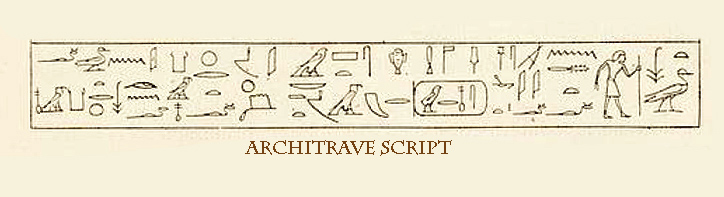
Kanefer title, drum over false door, mastaba Dahshur,

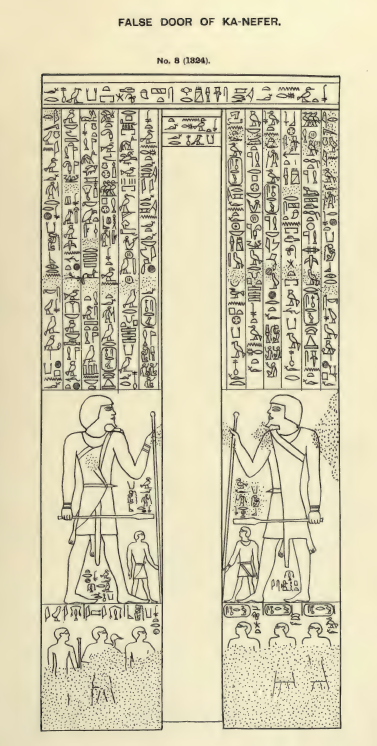
False door from mastaba Dahshur No.28 with text dedicated to Kanefer by his son Keiwareb, who appears on both sides

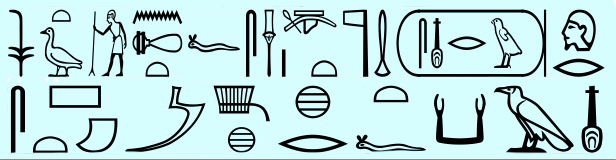
Transcription of the script from lintel drum, mastaba Dahsuhr

== Excavation ==
The vast necropolis of Dahshur is one of the large pyramid cemeteries of the Old and Middle Kingdom (2600–1700 BCE). The appearance of the natural landscape at Dahshur was intensely altered by human impact, especially through mining. The quarries of materials for pyramids buildings appear today as scarps and depressions. The channel beds in the wadis leading to the Bent Pyramid were also altered by use as transport paths for building material and by fluvial erosion. In the area between the pyramids of Sneferu, and northwest of the pyramid complex of Amenemhat II and Senwosret III (12th Dynasty), De Morgan had been conducting archaeological research on tombs of the 4th dynasty during year 1894-1895. The first report on the archaeological research carried out by de Morgan was sent to the "Académie des Inscriptions et Belles-Lettres"on March 8th 1895. Among other things, he also mentioned the opening of the main figures from the Sneferu time, whose tombs were found there. He also opened a mastaba, which he identified Kanefer as the owner, and addressed the title of Kanefer as "Son of the royal wing, who is the chief of his father, the son of Sneferu". De Morgan completed all the archaeological survey in 1895 and published a comprehensive work in year 1903. (Note: It is the most frequently commonly cited work in relation to the Kanefer's mastaba at Dahshur)

== Mastaba ==
The Kanefer mastaba is a large brick mastaba (36x25 m) with three wells. Along the eastern wall were two steles and offering tables from two entrance vaulted rooms lined with clay bricks. All that was left was badly damaged at the beginning of this century.Regarding their decoration, only the lower part of the false door and the outer jamb have been preserved, which are now stored separately in the Louvre and in the British Museum (BM). This amount of evidence has led all scholars to take Kanefer without hesitation as an authentic son of Sneferu. Moreover, the false door of Kanefer was built by his son Kaiwareb, (Note: It is not excluded that the old buildings were repaired and then the already mentioned steles were inserted into the walls) dating the reign of Khafra or possibly Djedefre, too.

In the spring of 2002, an excavation team from the Free University of Berlin worked in the cemetery east of the Red Pyramid and north of the Amenemhat II pyramid complex in Dahshur. Unfortunately, Morgan's documentation is sketchy, and the publication of Kanefer's tomb has been very superficial, so that in the current situation it is even difficult to locate Kanefer's tomb in the field. On the desert surface, only mastabas on the northwest edge of the cemetery can still be distinguished. However, the areas closer to the pyramid complex Amenemhat II are covered with extensive piles of rubble.

== Steles ==
Archaeological research in the Kanefer mastaba in Dahshur, found two steles in the style of false doors, one with inscriptions dedicated it to Prince Kanefer, the other dedicated to the mastaba restorer by his son Kaiwareb The first mentioned above, was offered with a broken top part in the acquisition to the Museum Louvre in year 1912, the second less damaged was offered to the British Museum in year 1901. Both mastabas in memory of Prince Kanefer contain records of his titles in the Vizier's administration. Their translation was made by De Morgan, with minor differences by Cherpion and much more comprehensively by Baud.

Prince Kanefer title are:
Son of the royal flank, he who is chief by his father's side, son of Sneferu, loved by his father every day, commander of the palace, beloved of his father, loyal to his father, prophet of Sneferu, commander of the priests, chief of clan, guardian of the palace, governor of the house of the five-great, chief of accounting, in charge of the seal, high priest of Heliopolis, servant of the spirits of Pa-Dep, officiant, eldest son from the royal flank, chief of the pyramid of Sneferu, curator, prophet of Horus-Neb-Mat, (prophet of the name of Sneferu's hawk) in charge of the seal of the god's boat, prophet of Horus, master of Mesen, commander of the priests of Nekheb in Elkab).

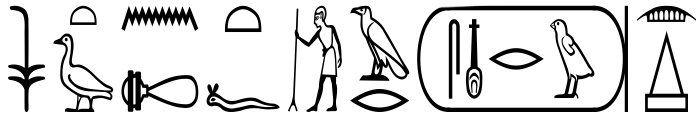
The stele stored in the BM exhibition dedicated to the memory of father Kanefer, which is in a relatively better preserved condition, again lists some of his titles in its upper part. The texts it bears commemorate the Prince Kanefer son of King Sneferu, and they are mostly concerned with his titles and dignities. The lintel and drum carry short texts with brief titles, and the full list of Kanefer's honours is reserved for the upper parts of the two panels. On several titles, the title "King's Eldest Son of His Body" is prefrontal, as seen in the title "Overseer of the Sneferu's Pyramid" . On either side of the false doorway there are large figures of Kanefer's eldest son Kaiwareb, dressed in official uniform carrying a sceptre and a monarch's staff

== Epilogue ==
Historical figures from the period of King Sneferu's reign, his sons and successors, who, according to the customs of the time, occupied the highest positions in the administration of the state, they provide a picture on the time of construction of large buildings and the synergy of the management apparatus, efficient builders and in a logistics system developed. Prince Kanefer Sneferu's son is an indispensable figure in this painting. (Note: Final note: The names Kanefer (Keinefer, Kanufer) or are in ancient Egypt very often used and their connection to a specific historical figure should be carefully examined in relation to a specific site, mastaba or museum artefacts etc.)

== Gallery ==
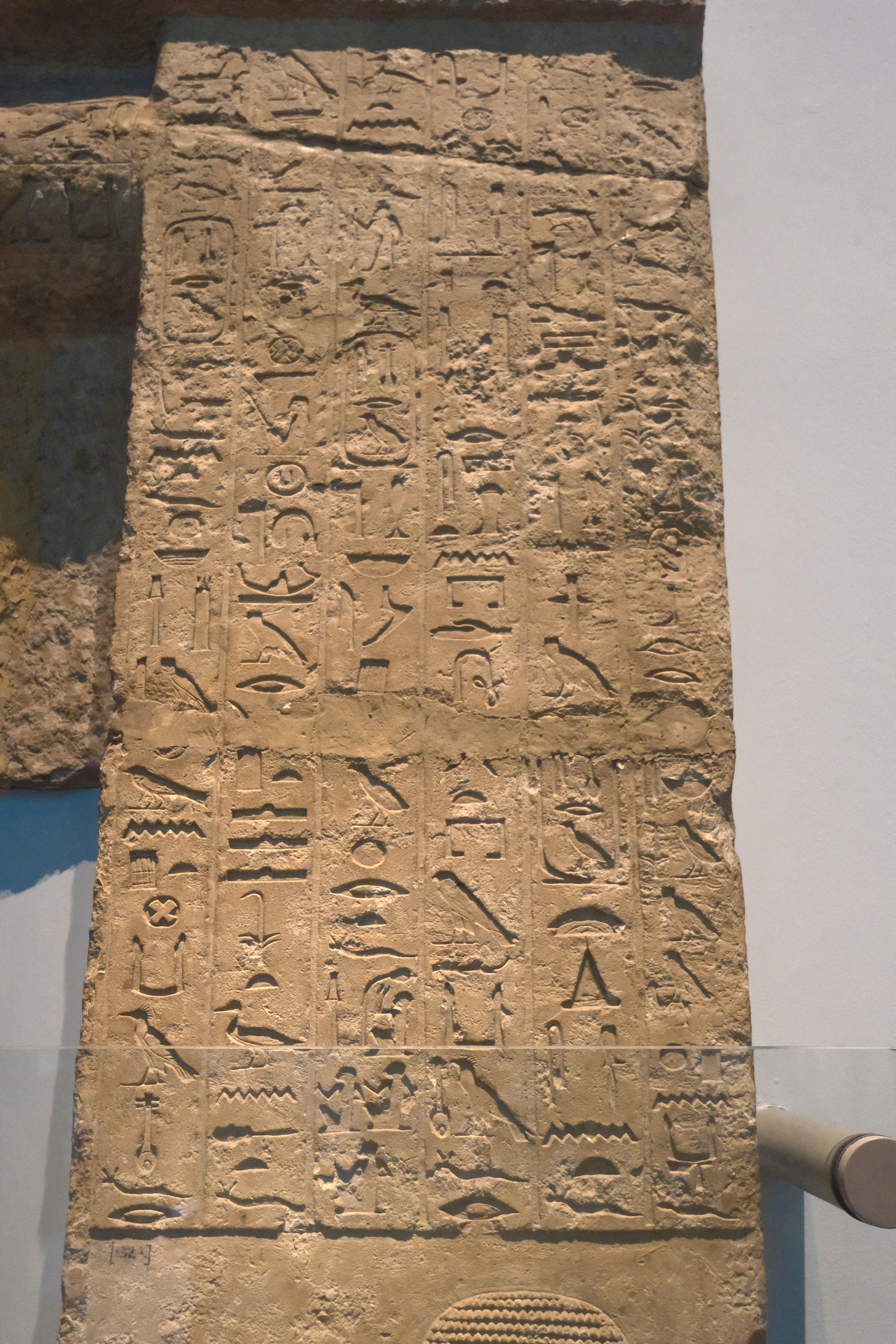
Text on the right side of the false door

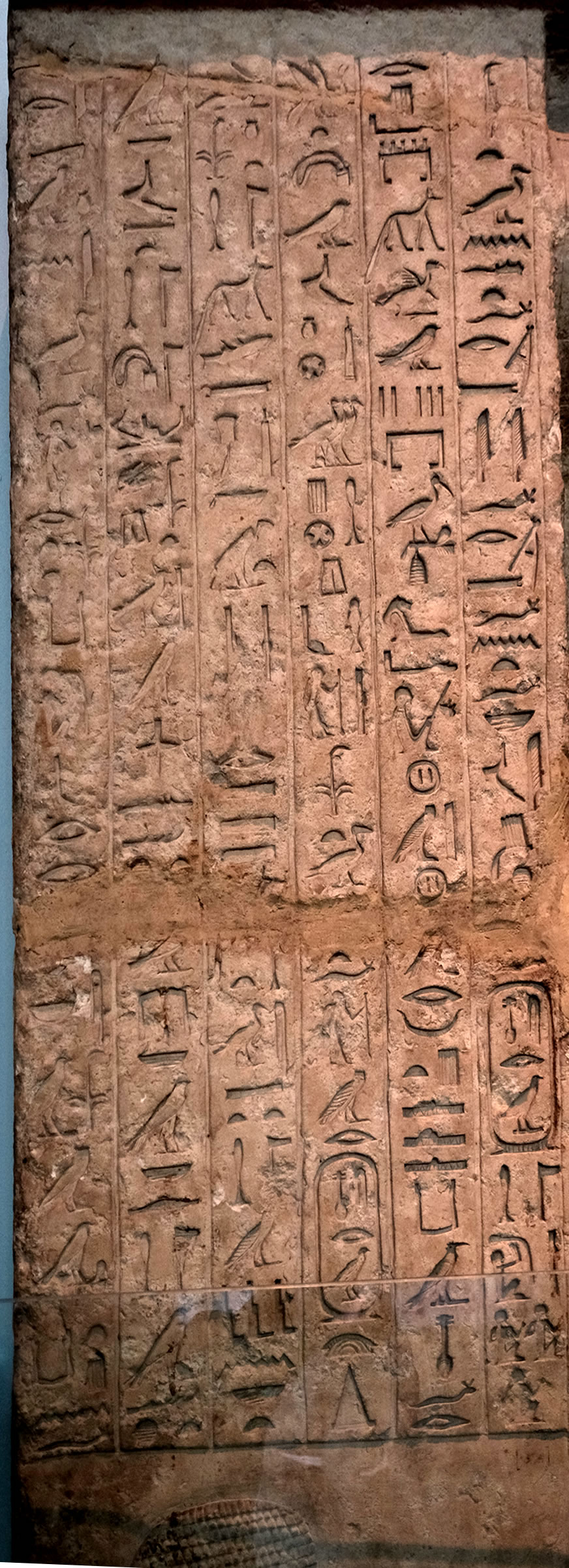
Text on the right side of the false door

== See also ==
Kanefer (High Priest of Ptah)

== Literature ==
- Aidan Dodson, Dyan Hilton: The Complete Royal Families of Ancient Egypt. The American University in Cairo Press, Kairo 2004, ISBN 977-424-878-3, p. 52–61
- Michael Haase: Das Feld der Tränen. König Snofru und die Pyramiden von Dahschur. Ullstein, München 2000, ISBN 3-550-07141-8, p. 217–219
- Miroslav Barta, The Title Inspector of the Palace during the Egyptian Old Kingdom, Oriental Institute of Science, Vol.67, Praha 1999
- Peter Manuelin, Slab stelae of Giza Necropolis, The Peabody Museum on Natural History of Yale University, Philadelphia, 2003,
