= Nakhy =

Ancient Egyptian priest

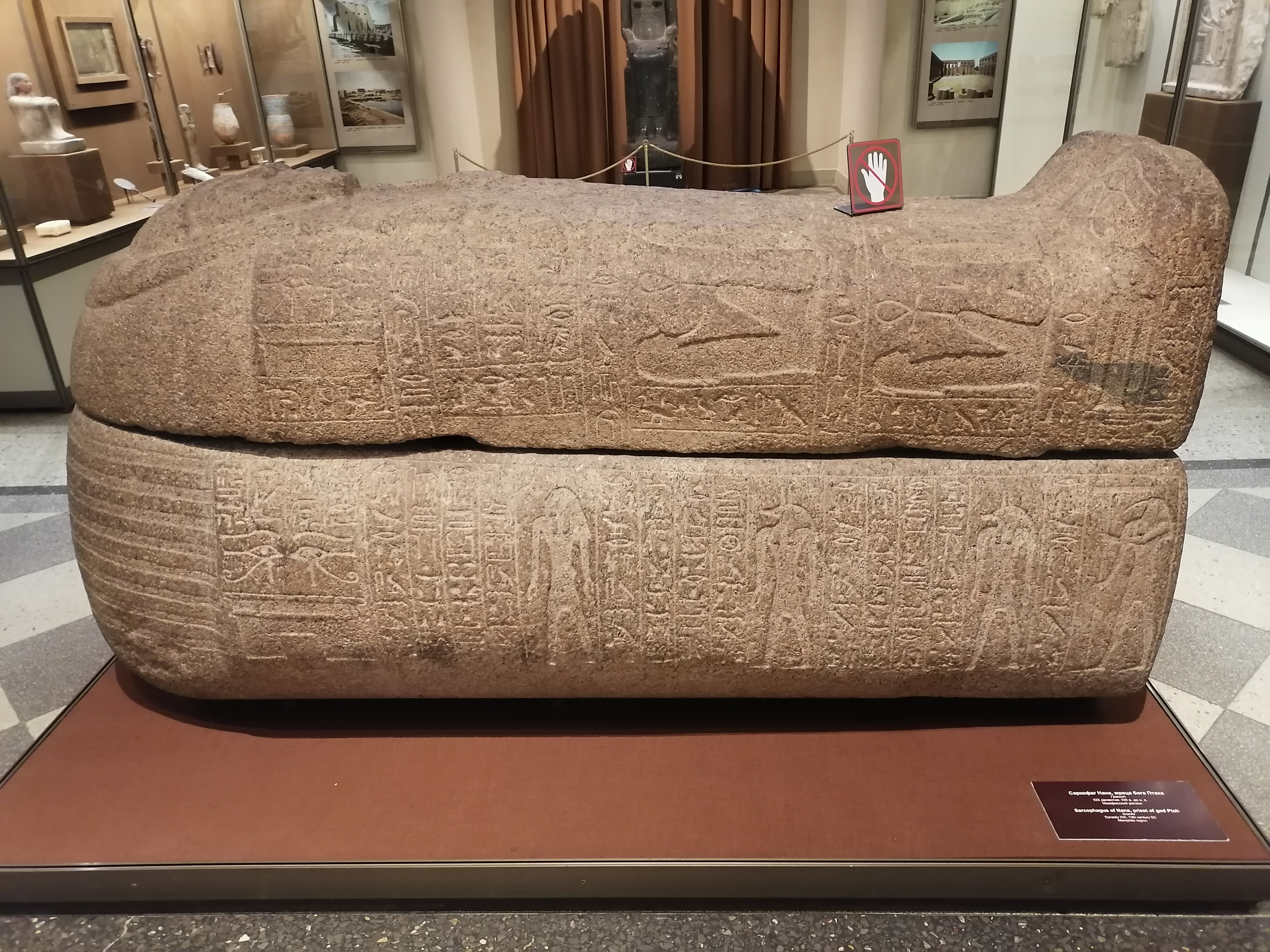
The sarcophagus of Nakhy

Nakhy (or Nana) was an Ancient Egyptian priest in the function of a High Priest of Ptah, who lived most likely in the 19th Dynasty.

Nakhy is only known from his granite sarcophagus that is today in the Hermitage Museum in Saint Petersburg (Inv. no. 768). The sarcophagus shows Nakhy as mummy and is decorated with images and texts. Next to the title of a high priest of Ptah, he also bears other important titles, such as member of the elite, overlord of the two countries, beloved one of the god and privy to the secret of the Ptah-temple. His parents are not named on the sarcophagus. Nakhy is not known from other sources and is therefore difficult to date, but the sarcophagus most likely dates to the 19th Dynasty. The high priest of Ptah was one of the most important religious officials in the Egyptian New Kingdom.

The reading of his name is disputed, some scholars read the name as Nana, others as Nakhy.
