= Pasherienptah III =

Ancient Egyptian high priest

- High Priest of Ptah in Memphis
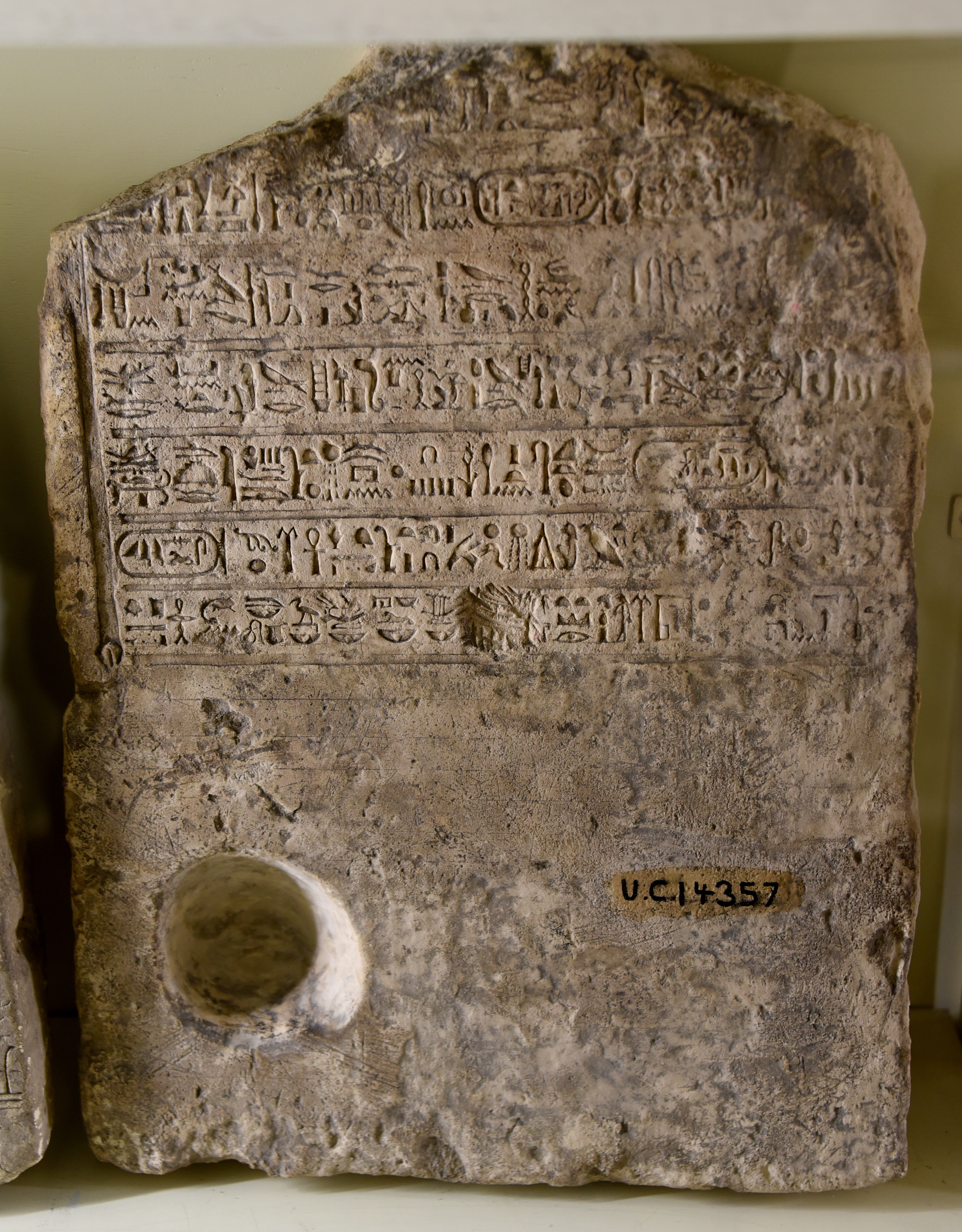
- Stele of Pasherienptah's daughter Kheredankh. Petrie Museum, London (UC14357)
Egyptian name
pA p t H n A17 H8 Z5
- Predecessor: Pedubast III
- Successor: Pasherienamun I
- Dynasty: Ptolemaic dynasty
- Pharaoh: Ptolemy X to Cleopatra VII
- Spouse: Taimhotep
- Father: Pedubast III
- Mother: Herankh-Beludje
- Siblings: Psherenamun I, Taneferher, Horemhotep
- Children: Berenice, Herankh-Beludje , Her'an-Tapedubast, Kheredankh, Imhotep-Pedubast

Pasherienptah (III) (p3-šrỉ-n-ptḥ, 'Son of Ptah'; November 4, 90 BCE – July 13 or 14, 41 BCE) was an ancient Egyptian high Priest of Ptah in Memphis from 76 BCE until his death. Two of his stelas are known, the one with a hieroglyphic inscription is in the Ashmolean Museum (Ash. M. 1971/18), the other, Demotic stela, of which only seven fragments have been found, is in the British Museum (BM 886).

== Background ==
Born in the 25th regnal year of Ptolemy X. He became High Priest at the age of fourteen and played an important role at the Sed festival of the king. It is also known that he made a visit to Alexandria, where he participated in a ritual honoring the goddess Isis. His autobiography also mentions a visit of the king to Memphis. At the age of 31, on July 25, 58 BCE he married fourteen-year-old Taimhotep, the member of a priestly family, and had three daughters in succession, Berenice (56/55–33 BCE), and Her'an-Tapedubast. They prayed to Imhotep – an Old Kingdom sage who was later deified and associated with Ptah – for a son. Their son Imhotep-Pedubast was born in 46 BCE, as Pasherienptah's fifth child. Another daughter, Kheredankh (65–44 BCE), was from a previous relationship.

Pasherienptah died at the age of 49, surviving his wife by one year, and was buried in the 12th regnal year of Cleopatra VII, on July 13 or 14, 41 BCE..

Following Pasherienptah III's death, Taimhotep's brother, Pasherienamun I, succeeded him as the High Priest of Ptah, serving from 41 BCE to 39 BCE. His son, Imhotep, succeeded his uncle as the high priest in 39 BCE at approximately seven or eight years of age. He died in 30 BCE, on the same day that Octavian captured Alexandria.
