= Impy II =

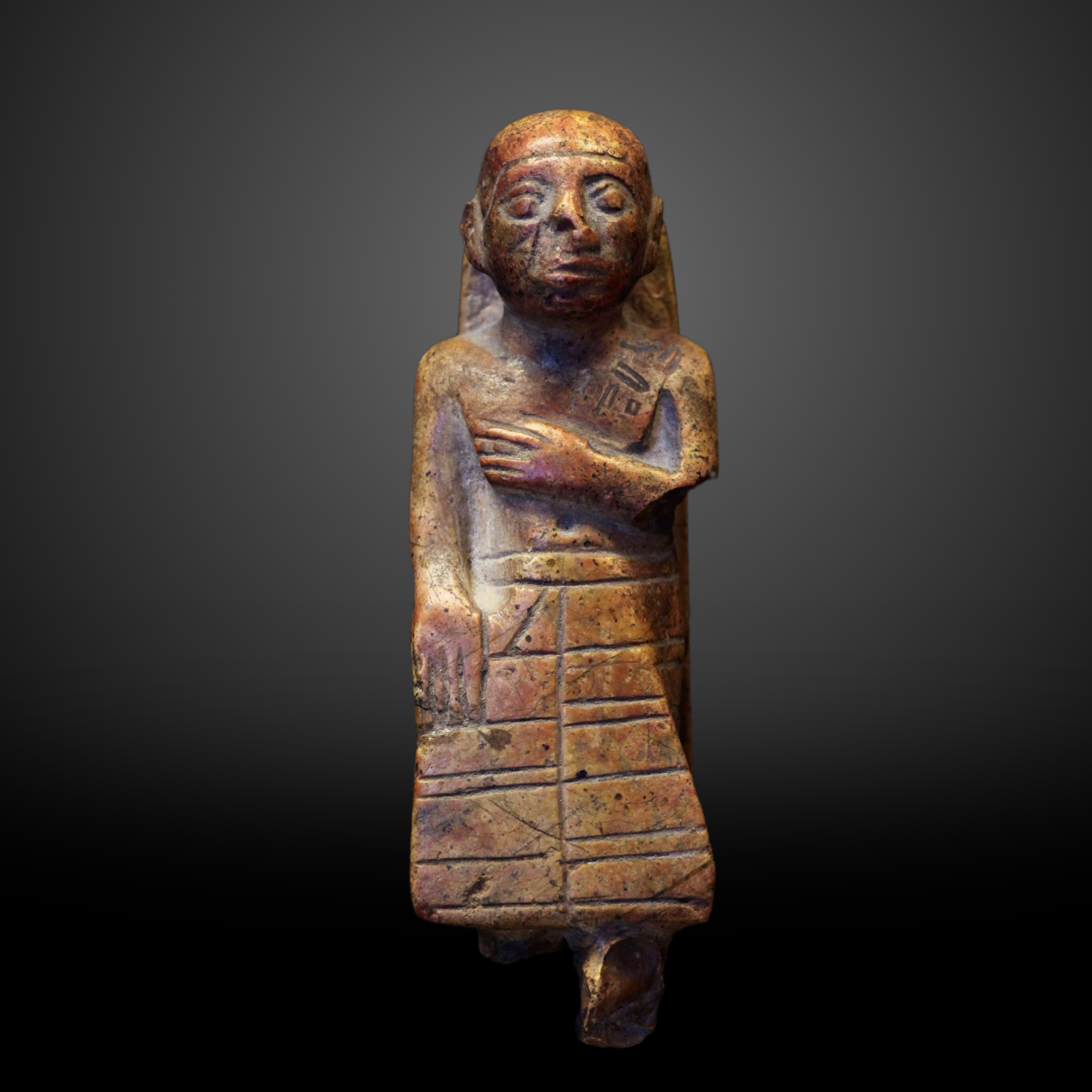
Statuette of Impy. Louvre E 17365, room 636.

Impy (also called Imephor; fl. c. 2225 BC) with the good name Nikauptah was High Priest of Ptah at the end of the ancient Egyptian Old Kingdom or First Intermediate Period. He is mainly known from his tomb and from a statuette now in the Louvre. His main monument is his recently excavated tomb at Kom el-Khamaseen, a small cemetery near Saqqara, about 3 km west of the Pyramid of Isesi. Decorated blocks from his tomb chapel appeared around 2009 on the art market. The tomb itself was excavated in 2019 and 2021.
