= Khuwyptah =

Former High Priest of Ptah

- High Priest of Ptah
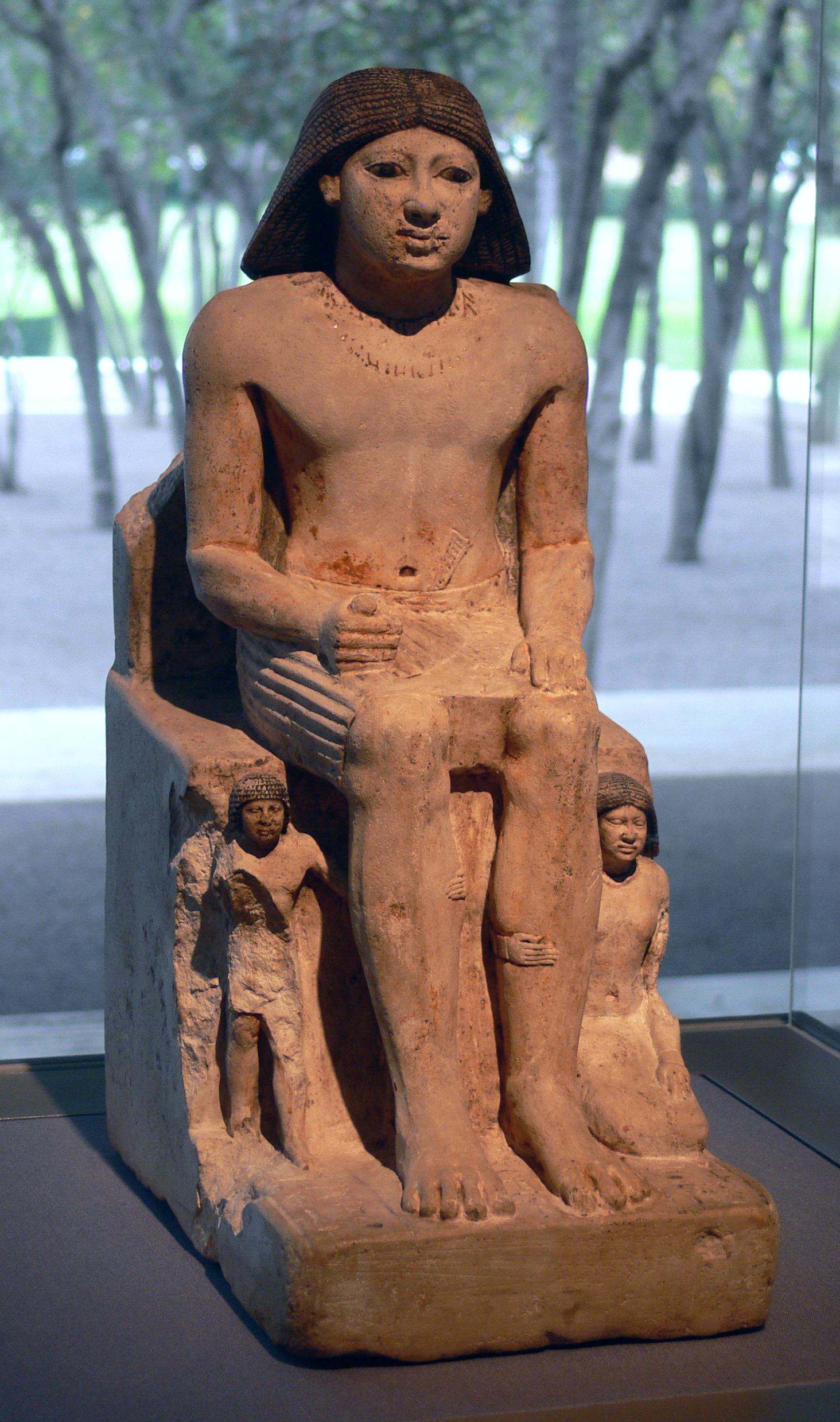
- Khuwyptah depicted as a boy with his parents
- Burial: Saqqara
- Spouse: Tjentety
- Father: Kanefer
- Mother: Tjentety

Khuwyptah was a High Priest of Ptah in Memphis around the reign of Neferirkare Kakai in the 5th Dynasty.

Khuwyptah was the son of Kanefer and Tjentety.

A statue group of Kanefer, his wife Tjentety and their son Khuwyptah is in the Kimbell Art Museum. Khuwyptah is shown leaning against his father's right leg.
