= Iyri =

Ancient Egyptian priest

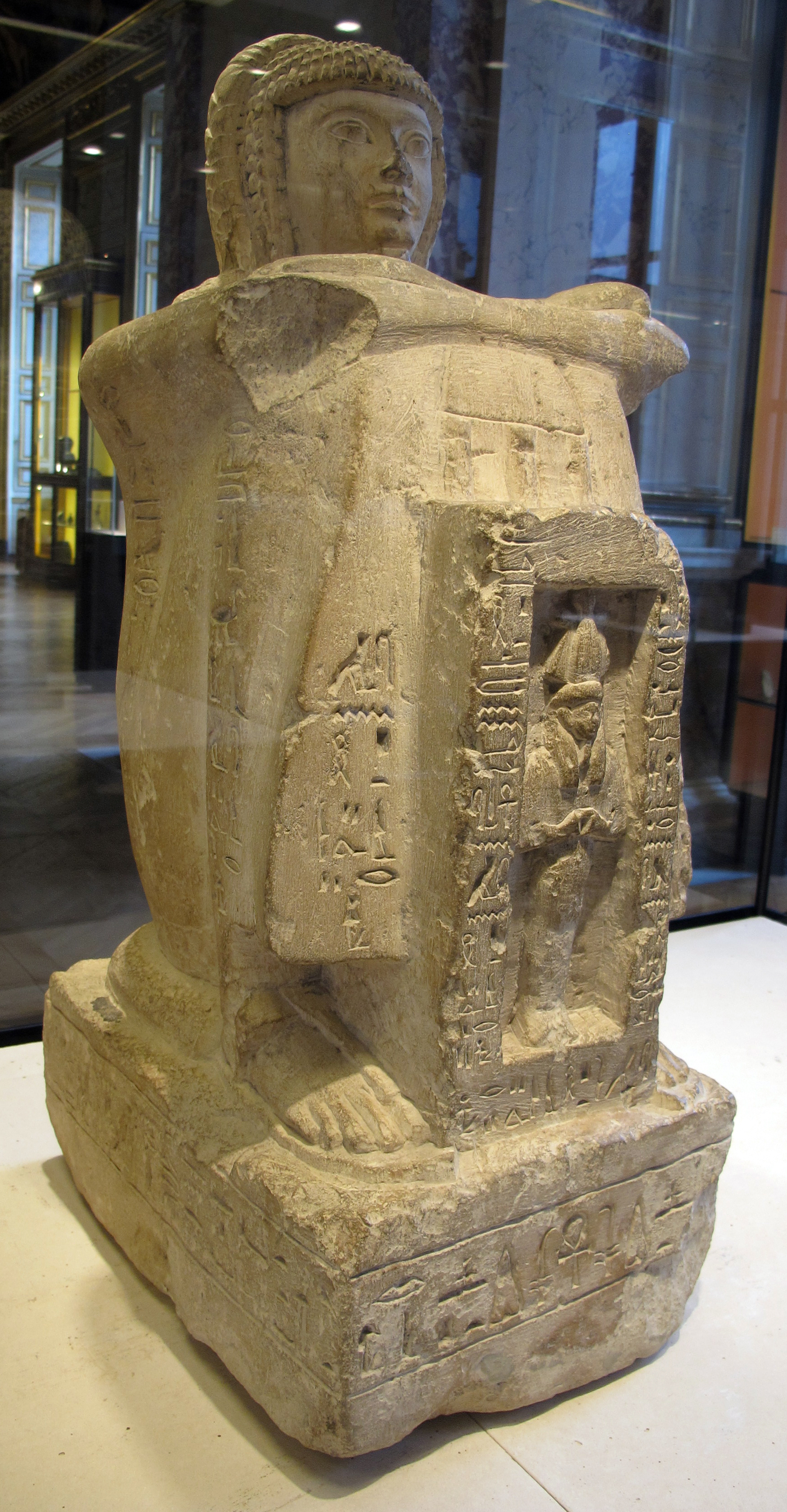
Block statue of Iyri, Louvre

Iyri was an ancient Egyptian priest in the function of a High Priest of Ptah, who was in office under king Seti II (c. 1203 BC to 1197 BC) in the Egyptian Nineteenth Dynasty.

i Z4 D54 i r y
Iyri
in hieroglyphs
Era: New Kingdom
(1550–1069 BC)

Iyri is known from a number of monuments, most of them coming from his tomb at Saqqara. One short text was recorded at his tomb and published in 1877. The exact location of the tomb was not recorded and is lost. Other blocks of the tomb were found reused in Mit Rahina (the site of the ancient town Memphis). Finally, he is known from a block statue that is today in the Louvre (inventory no. A 71 [N.72]). On the shoulders of the statue appears the name of king Seti II, providing a date for this official.
