= Sabu also called Ibebi =

Sabu called Ibebi
- High Priest of Ptah
Egyptian name
s F28 b w sr nfr r&n&f i b b i A1
sbw nfr rn.f ibbi
- Burial: Badrshein, Giza, Egypt
- Father: Ptahshepses
- Mother: Intyit
- Children: Ptahshepses and Sabu (possibly Sabu called Tjety)

Sabu called Ibebi (fl. c. 2350 BC) was a High Priest of Ptah during the reigns of Kings Unas and Teti.

Sabu's mastaba in Saqqara (Mariette's E1) contains several inscriptions showing how the king favored him. Sabu called Ibebi and his son Ptahshepses share a double mastaba (E1 and E2).

The inscriptions specifically mention that Sabu served under Unas and was later much honored by Teti.

His titles and epithets include: High priest of Ptah, cup-bearer of the king, master of secret things of the king in his every place, honored by the king, high priest of Ptah, attached to the Double House, feast-day attendant, pleasing every artificer, honored by every sovereign, a member of his court, attached to the heart of his lord, the favorite of his lord's heart, beloved of his lord, revered of Ptah, doing that which the god desired of him every day in the king's presence.
