= Pediese (prince in Athribis) =

The ancient Egyptian known as Pediese, married to the great-great-granddaughter of Shoshenq III, was one of a number of princes ruling Lower Egypt towards the end of the eighth century BCE. He was of Libyan descent, a chief of the Ma. After Piye conquered Memphis, Pediese surrendered his residence Athribis and may well have been instrumental in bringing about the surrender of most of the other chiefs and kings ruling the Nile Delta.

== Bibliography ==
- Ancient Records of Egypt, by J. H. Breasted, 1906, Part Four, sections 816-883
- From Slave to Pharaoh: The Black Experience of Ancient Egypt by Donald B. Redford, 2004 Johns Hopkins University Press, pp. 78f.
- The Oxford History of Ancient Egypt by Ian Shaw, 2003, p. 342
- Ancient Egyptian Literature: Old and Middle Kingdoms by Miriam Lichtheim, 1975, p. 79
- A History of Ancient Egypt by Nicholas Grimal, 1992 Blackwell Publishing p. 338
