= Pediese, chief of the Ma =

Ancient Egyptian high priest of Ptah, Chief of the Ma

Pediese
- High Priest of Ptah in Memphis
- Pediese. Closeup of the stele of the Year 28
- Predecessor: Takelot B?
- Successor: Peftjauawybast
- Dynasty: 22nd Dynasty
- Pharaoh: Shoshenq III, Pami
- Father: Takelot B
- Mother: Tijesbastperu
- Wife: Her-Bast, Tairy
- Children: Peftjauawybast, Takelot D

Pediese was a Chief of the Ma and a High Priest of Ptah under the Twenty-second Dynasty of Egypt, who was involved in the replacement of an Apis bull, which had died in the Year 28 of Shoshenq III, and again in the replacement of the subsequent Apis, in the Year 2 of Pami. Both the steles were found in the Serapeum of Saqqara and both are now in The Louvre.

His son Peftjauawybast succeeded him as High Priest of Ptah.

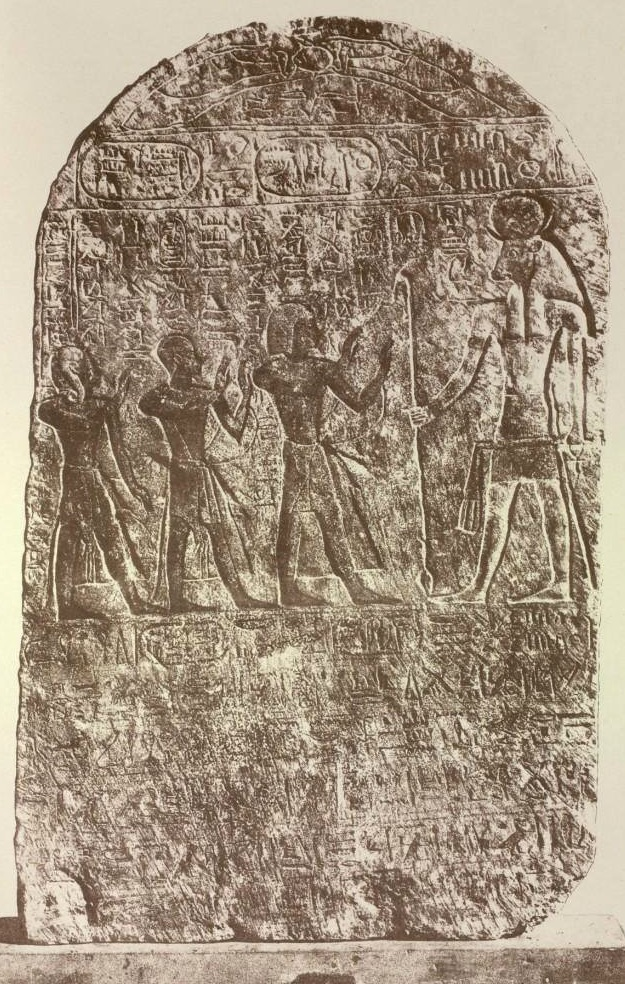
Pediese in front of the dead Apis on the stele of the Year 28 of Shoshenq III (IM. 3749)

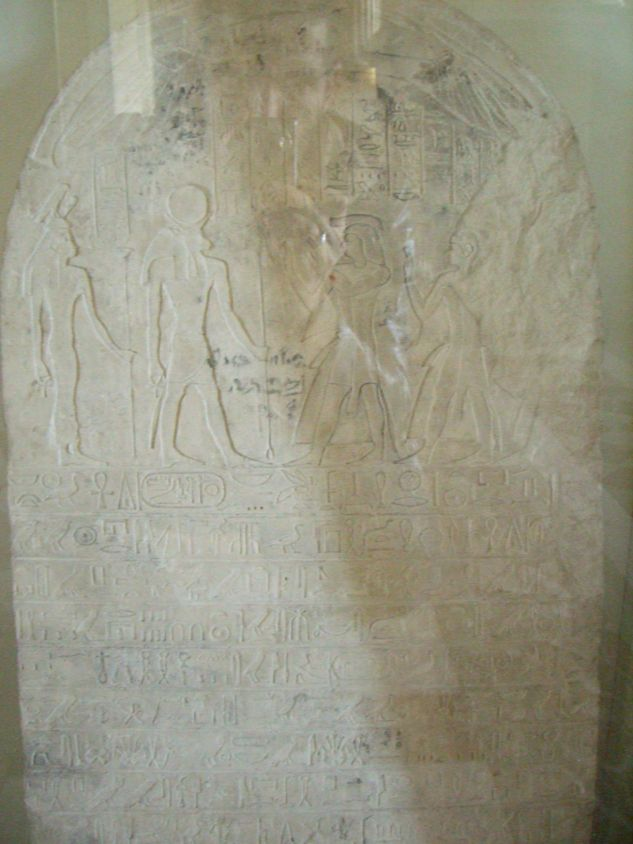
Pediese appears again on the stele of the Year 2 of Pami

== Bibliography ==
- Kenneth Anderson Kitchen, The Third Intermediate Period in Egypt, 1100-650 B.C., Aris & Phillips 1986, §§81f., 155, 301
