= Harsiese (High Priest of Ptah) =

Ancient Egyptian High Priest of Ptah

- High Priest of Ptah in Memphis
- Predecessor: Pipi A
- Successor: Neterkheperre Meryptah called Pipi II
- Dynasty: 21st Dynasty
- Pharaoh: Psusennes I
- Father: Pipi A
- Children: Harsiese

Harsiese was a High Priest of Ptah during the 21st Dynasty. Harsiese is sometimes referred to as Harsiese J.

Harsiese is known from the Genealogy of Ankhefensekhmet, where he is said to be a contemporary of Pharaoh Psusennes I. He is also mentioned in a genealogy from the Louvre.
