= Ashakhet II =

Ancient Egyptian high priest

Ashakhet
- High Priest of Ptah in Memphis
- Predecessor: Neterkheperre Meryptah called Pipi II
- Successor: Ankhefensekhmet
- Dynasty: 21st Dynasty
- Pharaoh: Siamun and Psusennes II
- Father: Neterkheperre Meryptah called Pipi II
- Children: Ankhefensekhmet

Ashakhet II was a High Priest of Ptah during the 21st Dynasty. He served during the reigns of Siamun and Psusennes II.

Ashakhet II is known from a genealogy known as Berlin 23673, where he is said to be a Chief of Secrets of the Great Seat and a prophet (hry-sSt3 (n) st-wrt, hm nTr). He is also mentioned in a genealogy from the Louvre where he is said to be a High Priest of Ptah.

Ashakhet was the son of Neterkheperre Meryptah called Pipi II by an unknown mother. He would later be succeeded by his son Ankhefensekhmet.
