= Sabu also called Tjety =

Ancient Egyptian high priest

- High Priest of Ptah
Egyptian name
S29 F28 D58 G43 T t i is3bw ṯti
- Burial: Badrshein, Giza, Egypt
- Children: Ptahshepses

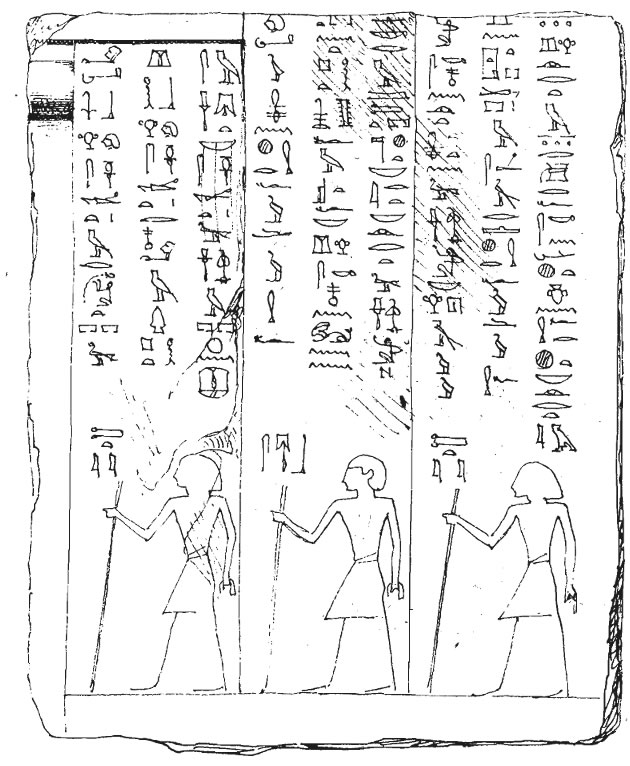
fragment of false door of Sabu also called Tjety

Sabu also called Tjety (fl. c. 2300 BC) was the High Priest of Ptah in the Sixth Dynasty of Ancient Egypt. Sabu is mainly known from the remains of his mastaba in Saqqara (E.3). The inscriptions on the fragment of a false door were copied in the 19th century and present part of a biography. The fragments are today in the Egyptian Museum in Cairo. Sabu bears several titles including: Greatest of the Directors of the Craftsmen in the two houses (wr ḫrpw hmwt m prwy - this is the title held by the High Priest of Ptah), chief lector priest, sole friend and count.

The text mentions that before Sabu was made High Priest of god Ptah there were always two men holding this position. Sabu was the first man to hold the position solely. His chronological position within the Sixth Dynasty is uncertain.
