= Sabu also called Kem =

Sabu
- High Priest of Ptah
- Burial: Badrshein, Giza, Egypt

Sabu called Kem (fl. c. 2300 BC) was High Priest of Ptah, probably during the reign of Pepi I. His precise titles include greatest of the directors of craftsmen belonging to the day of the festival of the Sun (this is the main title of a high priest of Ptah), priest of Sokar in the two houses and priest of Ptah.

Sabu's mastaba (C 23) in Saqqara is described by Auguste Mariette. It is built of limestone. The cult chamber consists of only one room, that is decorated with agricultural scenes. Here was also found a statue, showing Sabu totally naked. The statue is now in the Egyptian Museum, Cairo (Catalogue Generale no. 143).

== Bibliography ==
- Mariette, Auguste; Maspero, Gaston (1889). Les mastabas de l'Ancien Empire: Fragment du dernier ouvrage de A. Mariette, publié d'après le manuscrit de l'auteur. Paris. OCLC 46226552.
- Jones, Dilwyn (2000). An Index of Ancient Egyptian Titles, Epithets and Phrases of the Old Kingdom. Oxford: Archaeopress. OCLC 46226552.
