= Ptahmose I (High Priest of Ptah) =

High Priest of Ptah during the time of Thutmose III

- High Priest of Ptah in Memphis
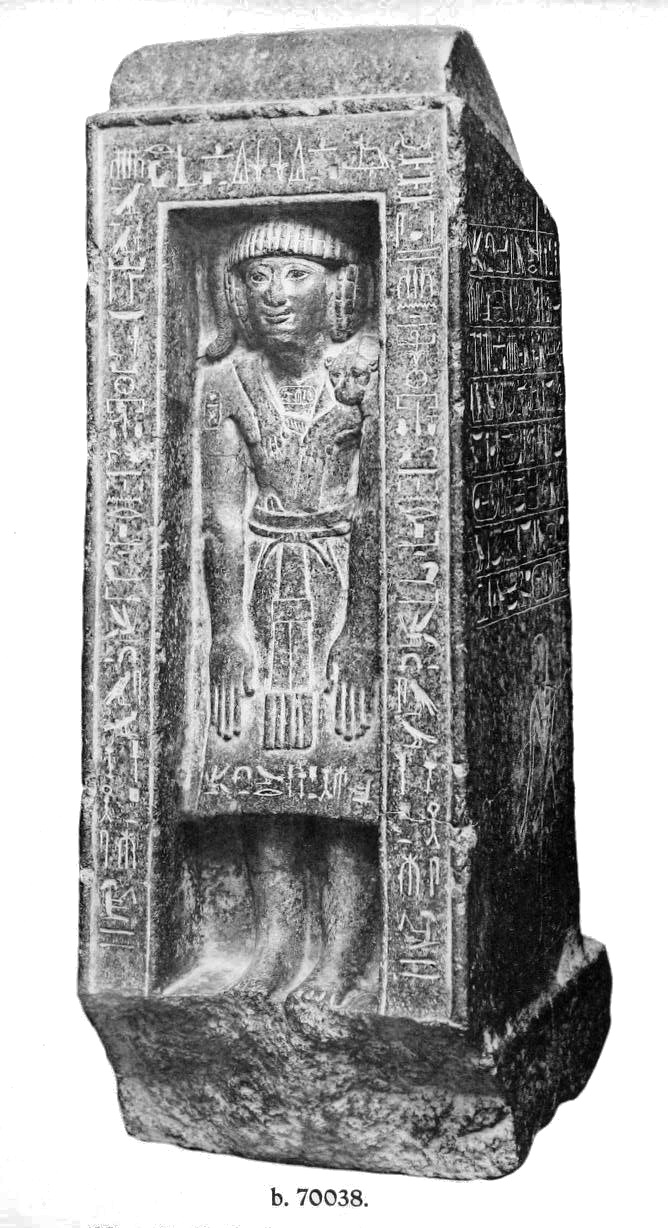
- Ptahmose inside a naos, in Cairo (CG 70038).
- Dynasty: 18th Dynasty
- Pharaoh: Thutmose III

Ptahmose was High Priest of Ptah in Memphis during the time of Thutmose III of the 18th Dynasty.

He held the titles of hereditary prince, count, seal-bearer of the king of Lower Egypt, sm-priest and High Priest of Ptah. A naos with statue of Ptahmose is located in Cairo Museum (CG 70038).
