= Shedsu-nefertum =

Ancient Egyptian high priest of Ptah

- High Priest of Ptah in Memphis
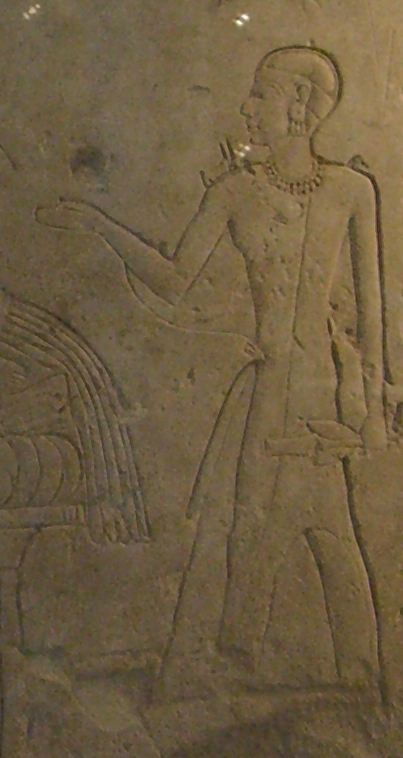
- Detail of a relief depicting Shedsu-nefertum (Musée du Louvre)
Egyptian name
G36 S42 U24 S29 G17 I1 D46 O34 F35 X1 U15 A1The Greatest of the Directors of the Craftsmen,
the sem priest Shedsu-nefertum
wr ḫ.rpw hmwt sm Šdsw-nfr-tm
- Predecessor: Ankhefensekhmet
- Successor: Shoshenq C
- Dynasty: 21st Dynasty
- Pharaoh: Siamen? and Osorkon I?
- Burial: Saqqara
- Spouse: Mehtenweskhet and Tentsepeh A
- Father: Ankhefensekhmet, High priest of Ptah
- Mother: Tapeshenese, First Chief of the Harem of Ptah and Prophetess of Mut
- Children: Ptahshepses

Shedsu-nefertum was a High Priest of Ptah at the end of the Twenty-first Dynasty of Egypt and beginning of the Twenty-second Dynasty. Shedsunefertem was the son of the High Priest Ankhefensekhmet and the lady Tapeshenese, who was First Chief of the Harem of Ptah and Prophetess of Mut.

Shedsu-nefertum had two wives. One of his wives was named Mehtenweskhet, who was probably a daughter of Nimlot A and Tentsepeh A. She was thus a sister of Shoshenq I. The other wife was named Tentsepeh B. She may have been a daughter of Psusennes II.
