= Meryptah (high priest of Ptah) =

Ancient Egyptian priest

Meryptah was an Ancient Egyptian priest at the end of the 18th Dynasty. He was High Priest of Ptah and therefore the most important religious official at the Ptah temple at Memphis, the capital of Egypt at that time.

Meryptah is only known from a few objects that date on stylistic grounds to the end of the 18th Dynasty. He appears on a relief most likely coming from his tomb at Saqqara. Furthermore, there is a statue, now in the Louvre (Inventory no. A 60) and an offering table in the Egyptian Museum of Berlin (Inventory no. 2273).
