= Ptahmose II (High Priest of Ptah) =

High Priest of Ptah during the time of Thutmose IV

- High Priest of Ptah in Memphis
- Dynasty: 18th Dynasty
- Pharaoh: Thutmose IV

Ptahmose was High Priest of Ptah in Memphis during the time of Thutmose IV. Ptahmose held the titles of High Priest of Ptah in the two houses (pr.wy), he who is over the secrets of the great [..] and of foremost position in Rostau.
