= Kanefer (High Priest of Ptah) =

- High Priest of Ptah
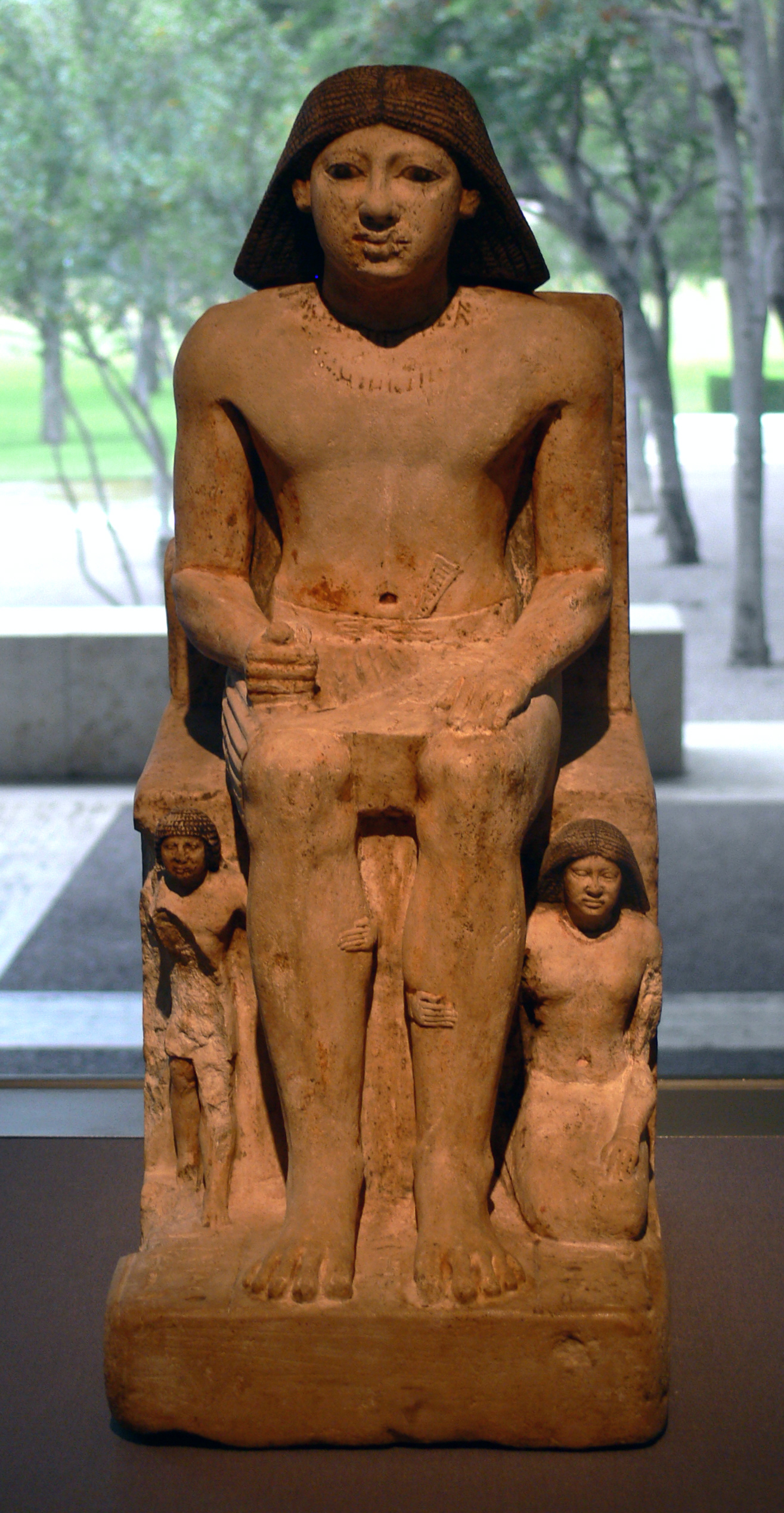
- Kanefer with his son and wife
- Burial: Saqqara
- Spouse: Tjentety
- Children: Khuwyptah

Kanefer (fl. c. 2480 BC) was a High Priest of Ptah in Memphis from the reign of Sahure in the Fifth Dynasty of Egypt.

Items from Kanefer's tomb are known from museum. Two offering tables exist at the British Museum and Ny Carlsberg Glyptotek of Copenhagen respectively.

A statue group of Kanefer, his wife Tjentety and their son Khuwyptah is in the Kimbell Art Museum. Kanefer is shown seated with his wife kneeling by his left leg and his son leaning against his right leg. Kanefer has the titles Overseer of the Craftsmen, Priest of Ptah, while his wife is a Royal Confidant. Kanefer's son Kuwyptah was also a High Priest of Ptah.

== See also ==
- Kanefer, a prince with the same name
