= High Priest of Ptah =

Priestly title in ancient Egypt

wr S42 U24
High Priest of Ptah
wr-ḫrp-ḥmwt
in hieroglyphs
Era: New Kingdom
(1550–1069 BC)

s m
Sem Priest (of Ptah)
(sm)
in hieroglyphs
Era: New Kingdom
(1550–1069 BC)

The High Priest of Ptah was sometimes referred to as "the Greatest of the Directors of Craftsmanship" (wr-ḫrp-ḥmwt). This title refers to Ptah as the patron god of the craftsmen.

The god Ptah

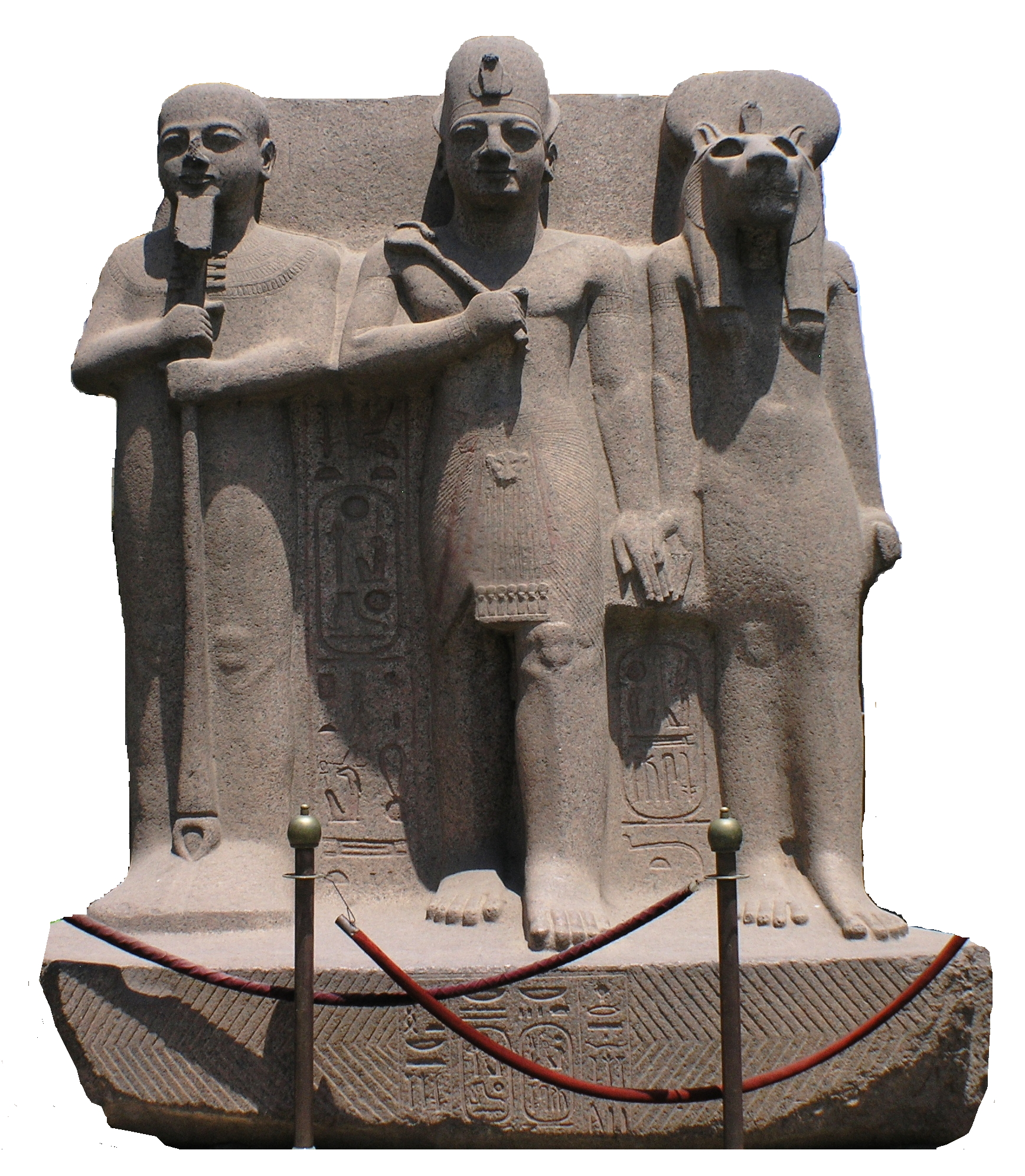
Ramesses II flanked by Ptah and Sekhmet

The office of the high priest of Ptah was located in Memphis in Lower Egypt. The temple of Ptah in Memphis was dedicated to Ptah, his consort Sekhmet and their son Nefertem.

== History ==
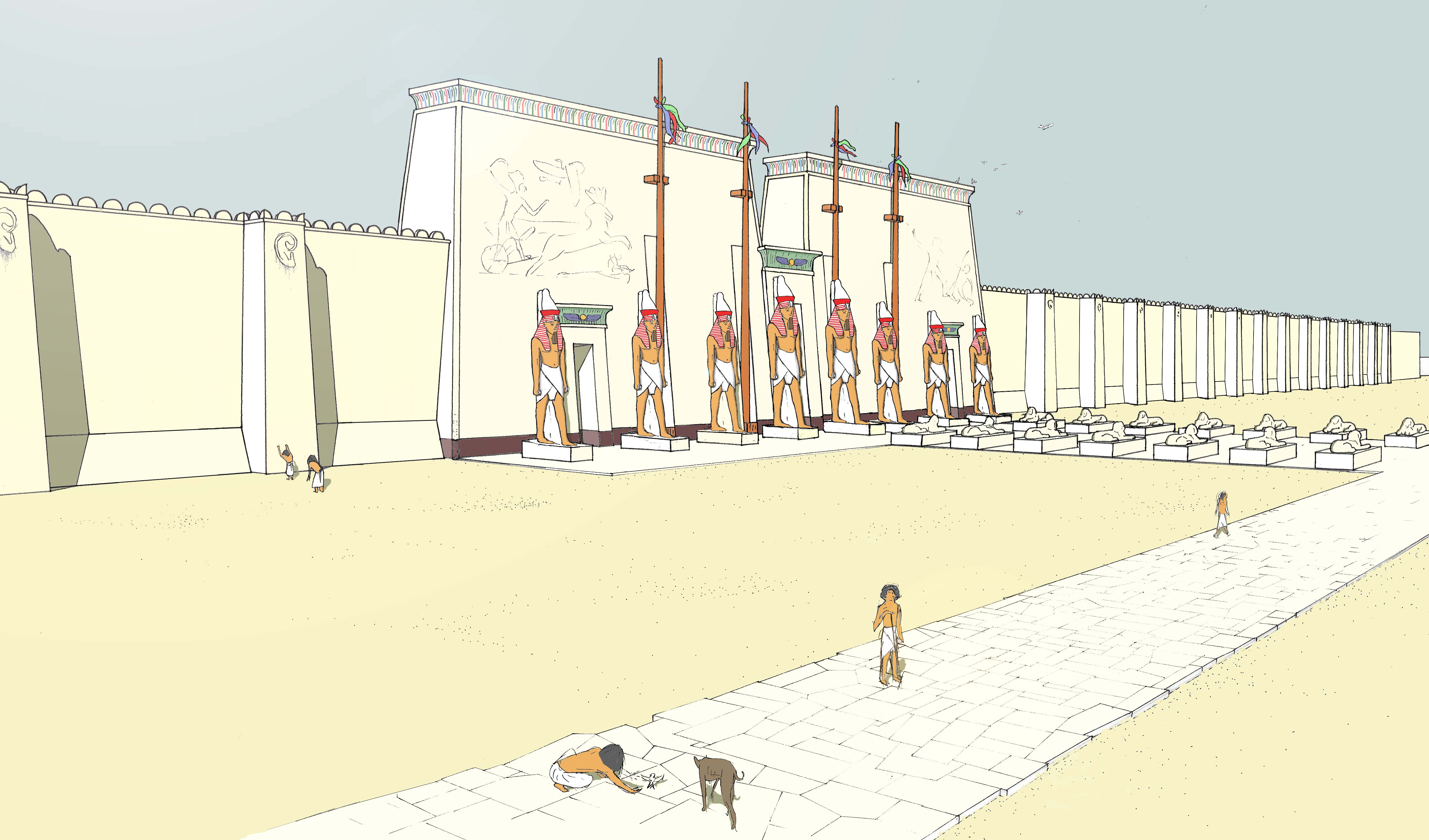
Reconstruction of the temple of Ptah in Memphis during the 19th Dynasty

High priests of Ptah are mentioned in inscriptions dating back to at least the Fourth Dynasty. In the tomb of the nobleman Debhen, for instance, there is a description of a visit by Pharaoh Menkaure to the construction site for his pyramid "Divine is Menkaure". The pharaoh is accompanied by a naval commander and two high priests of Ptah.

There used to be two high priests of Ptah until the Sixth Dynasty. It was probably during the reign of Pepi I Meryre that the two offices were combined into one. In the tomb of Sabu called Thety in Saqqara, the owner mentions that "His Majesty appointed me as High Priest of Memphis alone. [...] The temple of "Ptah-South-of-His-Wall" in its every place was under my charge, although there never was a single High Priest of Ptah before."

A large temple complex dating to the time of Ramesses II is located at the modern site of Mit Rahina. The Temple of Ptah from this time period was one of the largest temple complexes in Egypt. Not much of this complex has been excavated because a large part of the site lies very close to the modern town.

It continued to be an important office in the Ptolemaic period, and the priestly family held many important priestly positions. The high priests crowned some of the Ptolemaic monarchs, and they also served as scribes in the dynastic cult of Arsinoe. The family was speculated to have a blood tie to the Ptolemaic family via a woman named "Berenice", wife of Psenptais II, who was claimed by some modern historians to possibly be a daughter of Ptolemy VIII. However, this speculation has recently been refuted by Egyptologist Wendy Cheshire.

The office appears to have disappeared during Roman rule of Egypt; it is last attested in 23 BC.

=== Sem Priest of Ptah ===
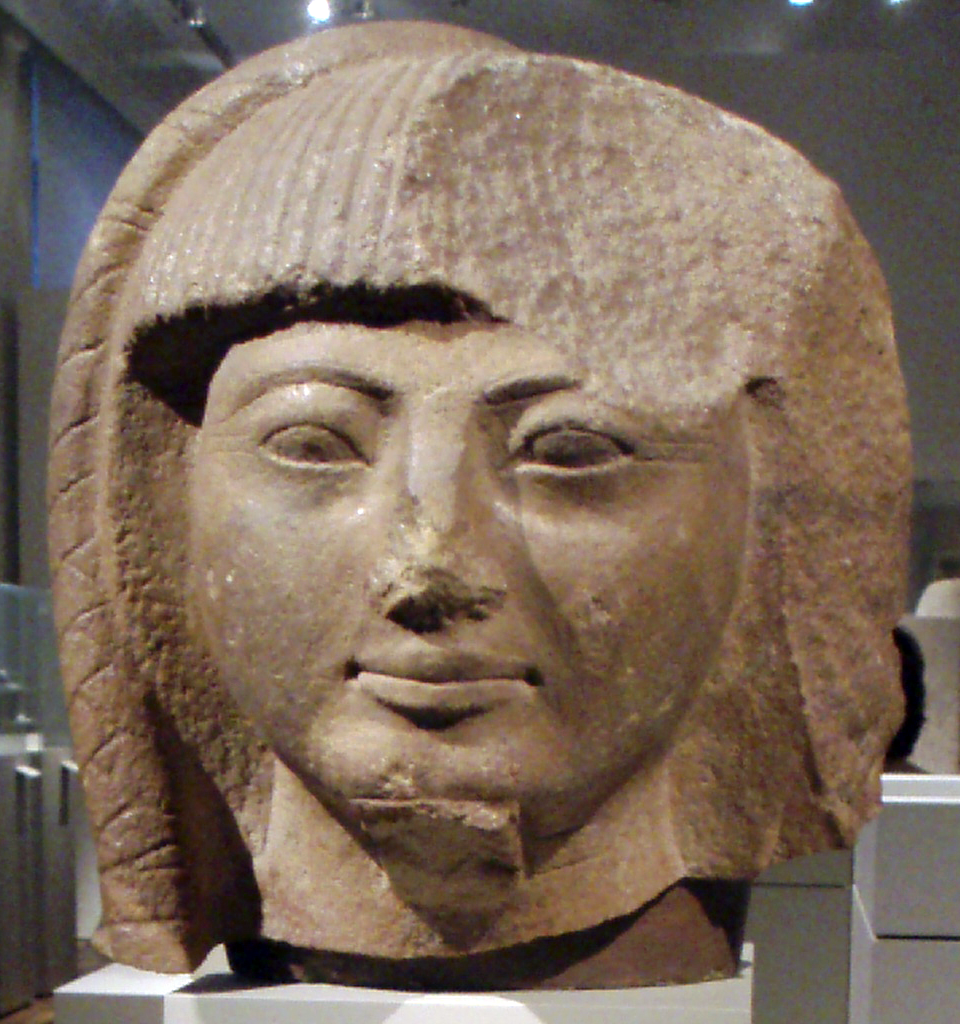
Prince Khaemwaset with the short wig and side lock typical for the sem priest of Ptah

It was common for the high priest to also hold the title of sem priest of Ptah. The sem priest could be recognized by the fact that he wore a short wig with a side-lock and was dressed in a panther skin.

== List of high priests ==
=== Old Kingdom ===
- Ptah-Du-Auu from the 4th dynasty
- Ptahshepses lived during the reigns of Menkaure through to Niuserre
- Ranefer Dynasty 5, reign of Shepseskaf to Userkaf
- Kanefer Dynasty 5, reign of Sahure
- Khuwyptah Dynasty 5, reign of Neferirkare Kakai
- Ptahshepses II Dynasty 5, reign of Unas
- Sabu also called Ibebi 5th and 6th dynasty reign of Unas and Teti
- Sabu also called Tjety. Time of Teti, possibly to Pepi I (dynasty 6).
- Sabu also called Kem. Time of Teti, possibly to Pepi I (dynasty 6).
- Impy II

=== Middle Kingdom ===
- Ptahemheb 11th Dynasty.
- Sehetepebre-ankh time of Senusret I (Statue in Brooklyn Museum, Genealogy of Ankhefensekhmet Berlin 23673)
- Senewosret-Ankh time of Senusret I?
- Khakare-ankh time of Amenenhet II, known from the Genealogy of Ankhefensekhmet (Berlin 23673)
- Nebkaure-ankh time of Senusret III, known from the Genealogy of Ankhefensekhmet (Berlin 23673)
- Ouahet time of Senusret III
- Nefertem
- Sehetepebreankh-nedjem time of Senusret III to Amenemhat III.
- Nebpu time of Amenemhat III.
- (..)hotepib(rê?) Sheri Time of Amenemhat III
- Impy I Time of Amenemhat III - Amenemhat IV

=== Second Intermediate Period ===
- Sergem (High Priest of Ptah) Time of Iby I (13th dynasty)
- Sobekhotep (Haku), known from a statue and a seal
- Senbuy
- Seneber... (name not fully preserved), known from a papyrus found at Lahun
- Ptahemhat 15th dynasty

=== New Kingdom ===
==== Eighteenth Dynasty ====
- Pahemred Time of Amenhotep I
- Sennefer Time of Amenhotep II
- Ptahmose I Time of Tuthmosis III
- Ptahmose II Time of Tuthmosis IV – Amenhotep III?
- Penbenebes Time of Amenhotep III Only known from a stela now in Berlin.
- Wermer Time of Amenhotep III Only known from a stela now in Berlin.
- Ptahmose, son of Thutmose Son of vizier Thutmose. Reign of Amenhotep III.
- Ptahmose, son of Menkheper Son of Menkheper, Reign of Amenhotep III.
- Thutmose Son of Amenhotep III and Queen Tiye. Time of Amenhotep III.
- Pahemnetjer, son of Ptahmose Time of Amenhotep III.
- Ptahemhat called Ty Time of Tutankhamen and/or Ay.
- Meryptah Late 18th dynasty. Possibly from the time of Ay and Horemheb.

==== Nineteenth Dynasty ====
- Sokaremsaf Time of Seti I, known from the Genealogy of Ankhefensekhmet (Berlin 23673)
- Netjeruihotep Time of Seti I
- Iry-Iry Time of Ramses II
- Huy reign of Ramesses II
- Pahemnetjer reign of Ramesses II
- Didia reign of Ramesses II
- Khaemwaset son of Ramesses II and Isetnofret
- (Pa)Rahotep reign of Ramesses II
- Neferronpet reign of Ramesses II
- Hori I Son of Prince Khaemwaset. Became HPM in year 65/66 of the reign of Ramesses II. He continued to serve under his uncle Merneptah (Hori may have been High priest from c. 1214 - c. 1203 BCE).
- Iyri Time of Seti II
- Nakhy

==== Twentieth Dynasty ====
- Ptahemhat Time of Ramesses III (1186–1155 BCE)
- Neferrenpet Time of Ramesses IX (1129–1111 BCE)

=== Third Intermediate Period ===
==== Twenty-first Dynasty ====
- Ptahemakhet
- Ashakhet I c. 1062–1047 From the time of Amenemnisu
- Pipi A c. 1047–1027 Time of Psusennes I. Son of Ashaket A.
- Harsiese (High Priest of Ptah) c. 1027–1017 Time of Psusennes I. Son of Pipi A
- Neterkheperre Meryptah called Pipi II c. 1017–997 Time of Psusennes I, Amenemope, Osorkon the Elder and Siamun.
- Ashakhet II c. 997–982. Son of HPM Pipi II. Father of HPM Ankhefensekhmet.
- Ankhefensekhmet (A) c. 982–962. Son of Ashaket. Dated to the time of Siamen.
- Shedsu-nefertum c. 962–942. End of Dynasty 21, beginning of dynasty 22, including Shoshenq I Shedsu-nefertum was a son of the High Priest Ankhefensekhmet.

==== Twenty-second Dynasty ====
- Shoshenq C c. 920–895 Son of the high priest Shedsu-nefertum. Father of the high priest Osorkon A. Time of King Osorkon I?
- Osorkon A c. 895 –870 Time of King Osorkon I, Takelot I and Osorkon II? Son of Shoshenq C.
- Shoshenq D c. 870–851 Son of King Osorkon II and Queen Karomama (B). Time of King Osorkon II.
- Merenptah (High Priest of Ptah), c. 851–830 Time of Takelot II
- Takelot B c. 830–810 Time of Takelot II and Shoshenq III. Son of Shoshenq D
- Pedieset c. 810–770 Son of HPM Takelot B and Princess Tjesbastperu.
- Peftjauawybast (High Priest of Ptah) c. 790–780 Son of the high priest Pedieset and Tairy. Time of Shoshenq III
- Harsiese II (High Priest of Ptah). Son of the high priest Peftjauawybast or son of Pedieset c. 780–760 Time of Pami.
- Ankhefensekhmet (B), c. 760–740 Time of Shoshenq IV Son of Harsiese.

==== Twenty-fifth Dynasty ====
- Pedekhons?

=== Late Period ===
- Pedepep, temp. Psammetikhos I
- Pefteuemauibaste

=== Ptolemaic Period ===
The High Priests of Ptah in Memphis became very important during the Ptolemaic Period.

- Nesisti-Pedubast, son of Anemhor I and Renpet-neferet. Married to Renpet-neferet and Nefersobek. Children included Pedubast, Khonsiu, Amenhor II, Nefertiti and Neferibre.
- Pedubast I (High Priest of Ptah), son of Nesisti-Pedubast and Nefersobek.
- Amenhor II, son of Nesisti-Pedubast and Nefersobek. Married Herankh. Children include Djedhor, Horemakhet and possibly Horemhotep.
- Djedhor son of Amenhor II and Herankh.
- Horemakhet (223 BCE) son of Amenhor II and Herankh.
- Nesisti (c. 190 BCE), son of Horemakhet and Nefertiti. Succeeded Horemakhet as High Priest of Memphis probably between 194/3 and 180
- Pedubast II (High Priest of Ptah), son of Psherenptah and Taimhotep. Grandson of Horemakhet and Nefertiti.
- Psherenptah II, son of Pedubast II
- Pedubast III (High Priest of Ptah) (103 BCE), son of Psherenptah II and Berenice
- Psherenptah III (76 BCE), son of Pedubast III and Herankh-beludje
- Imhotep-Pedubast (39 BCE), son of Psherenptah III and Taimhotep
- Psherenamun I (30 BCE), brother-in-law of Psherenptah III. Son of Ka-hapi and Her-ankh
- Psherenamun II (27 BCE), son of Psherenamun I and Taneferher.
