= Ptahmose, son of Thutmose =

Ancient Egyptian High Priest of Ptah

- High Priest of Ptah in Memphis
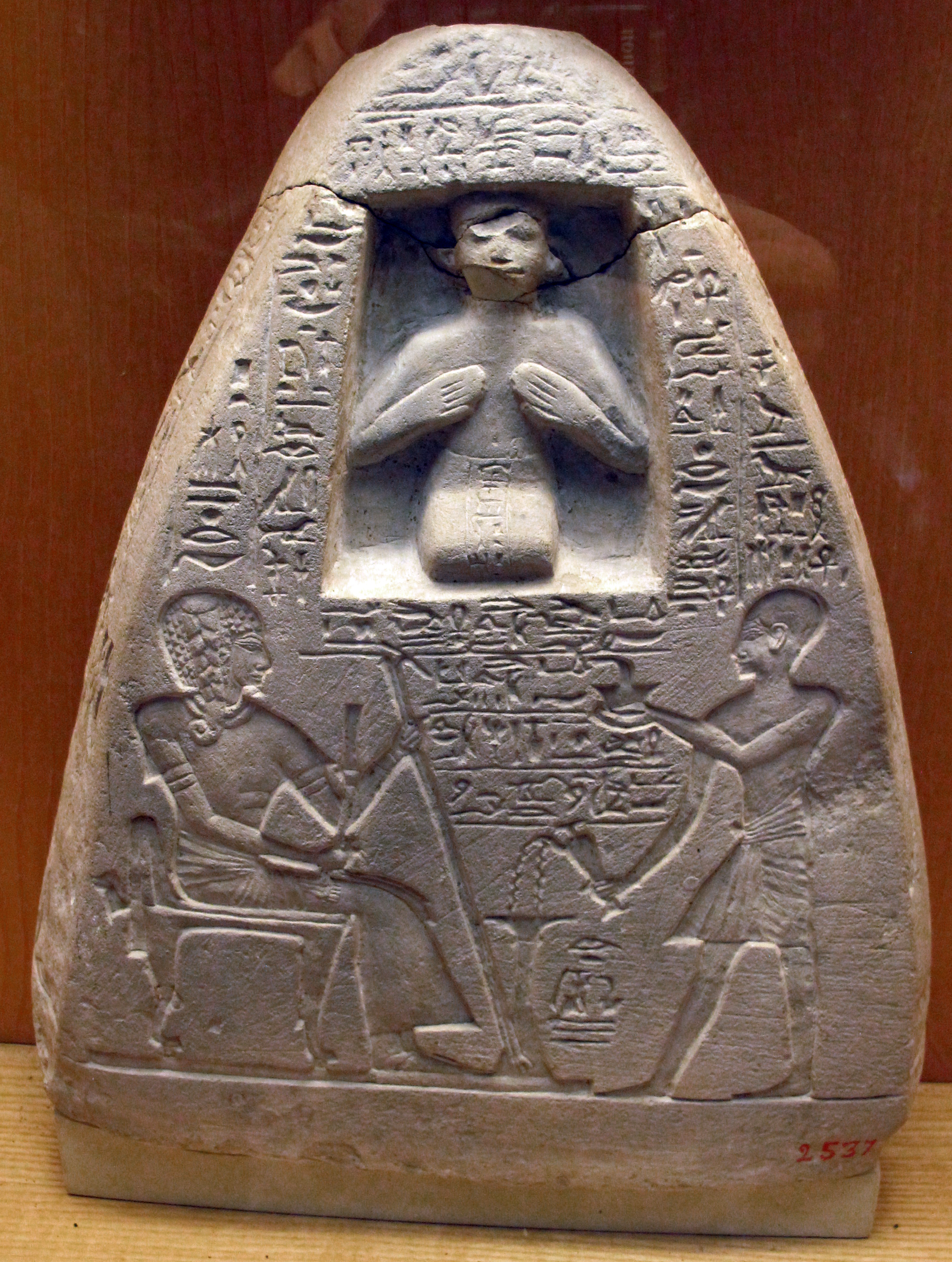
- Pyramidion/funerary stele for the High Priest of Ptah, Ptahmose.
- Dynasty: 18th Dynasty
- Pharaoh: Thutmosis IV and Amenhotep III
- Burial: Saqqara
- Father: Thutmose, vizier
- Mother: Tawy, lady of the house.

Ptahmose was High Priest of Ptah in Memphis during the time of Thutmose IV and in the beginning of the reign of Amenhotep III.

Ptahmose is mentioned on a round topped, limestone stela with his brother Meryptah. Ptahmose and his brother are sons of the Vizier Thutmose and his wife Tawy. Ptahmose held the titles of count and governor, one great in his office and important in the palace, Sem-priest, and Chief of the Master-craftsmen (High Priest of Ptah).

Ptahmose's brother Meryptah is a well-known individual. He was a count and governor, beloved Sole Companion, confidant of the Good God, the Prophet and Chief Steward of the Mansion of Amenhotep III. Meryptah served as steward in Amenhotep III's mortuary temple and held the position of High Priest of Ptah in Thebes.
