= British Museum Department of Ancient Egypt and Sudan =

Ancient Egyptian And Sudanese Museum Department

Coordinates: 51°31′9.62″N 0°7′39.87″W

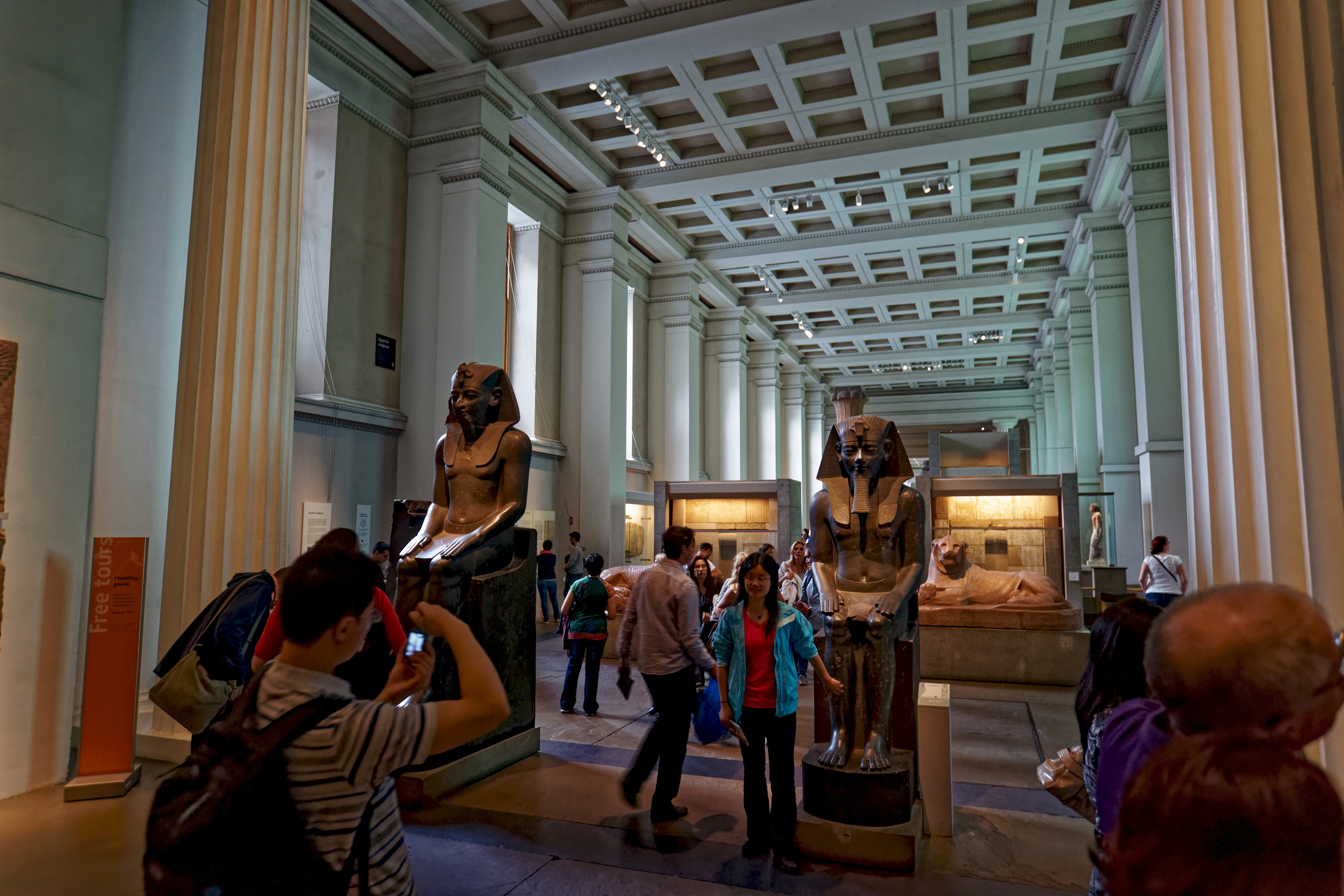
Egyptian Room

The Department of Ancient Egypt is a department forming an historic part of the British Museum, with Its more than 100,000 pieces making it the largest^{[h]} and most comprehensive collection of Egyptian antiquities outside the Egyptian Museum in Cairo.

== History ==
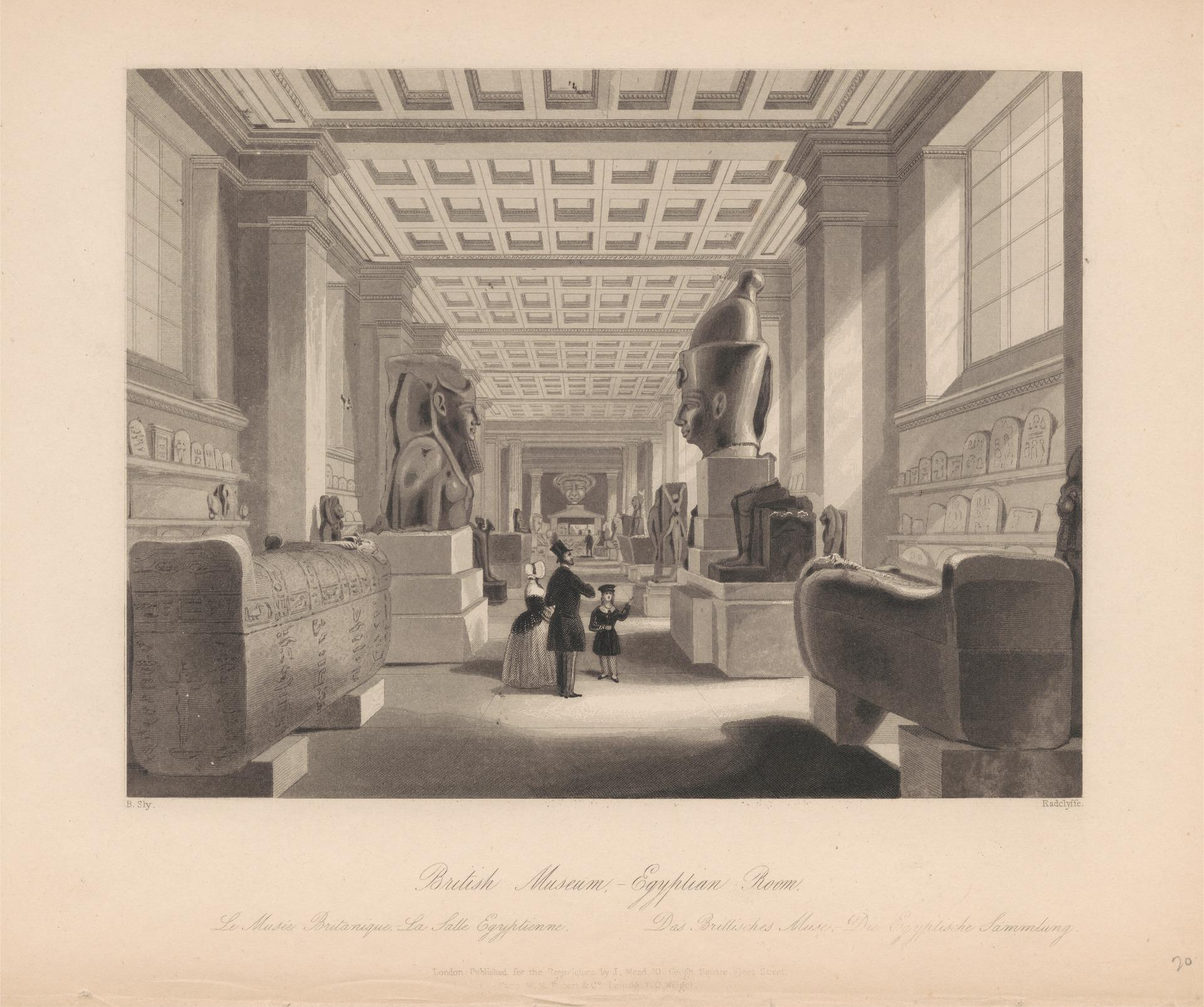
View through the Egyptian Room

Egyptian antiquities have formed part of the British Museum collection ever since its foundation in 1753 after receiving 160 Egyptian objects from Sir Hans Sloane. After the defeat of the French forces under Napoleon at the Battle of the Nile in 1798, the Egyptian antiquities collected were confiscated by the British army and presented to the British Museum in 1803. These works, which included the famed Rosetta Stone, were the first important group of large sculptures to be acquired by the museum. Thereafter, the UK appointed Henry Salt as consul in Egypt who amassed a huge collection of antiquities, some of which were assembled and transported with great ingenuity by the famous Italian explorer Giovanni Belzoni. Most of the antiquities Salt collected were purchased by the British Museum and the Musée du Louvre.

By 1866 the collection consisted of some 10,000 objects. Antiquities from excavations started to come to the museum in the latter part of the 19th century as a result of the work of the Egypt Exploration Fund under the efforts of E.A. Wallis Budge. Over the years more than 11,000 objects came from this source, including pieces from Amarna, Bubastis and Deir el-Bahari. Other organisations and individuals also excavated and donated objects to the British Museum, including Flinders Petrie's Egypt Research Account and the British School of Archaeology in Egypt, as well as the Oxford University Expedition to Kawa and Faras in Sudan.

Active support by the museum for excavations in Egypt continued to result in important acquisitions throughout the 20th century until changes in antiquities laws in Egypt led to the suspension of policies allowing finds to be exported, although divisions still continue in Sudan. The British Museum conducted its own excavations in Egypt where it received divisions of finds, including Asyut (1907), Mostagedda and Matmar (1920s), Ashmunein (1980s) and sites in Sudan such as Soba, Kawa and the Northern Dongola Reach (1990s). The size of the Egyptian collections now stand at over 110,000 objects.

In autumn 2001, the eight million objects forming the museum's permanent collection were further expanded by the addition of six million objects from the Wendorf Collection of Egyptian and Sudanese Prehistory. These were donated by Professor Fred Wendorf of Southern Methodist University in Texas, and comprise the entire collection of artefacts and environmental remains from his excavations at Prehistoric sites in the Sahara Desert between 1963 and 1997. Other fieldwork collections have recently come from Dietrich and Rosemarie Klemm (LMU Munich) and William Adams (University of Kentucky).

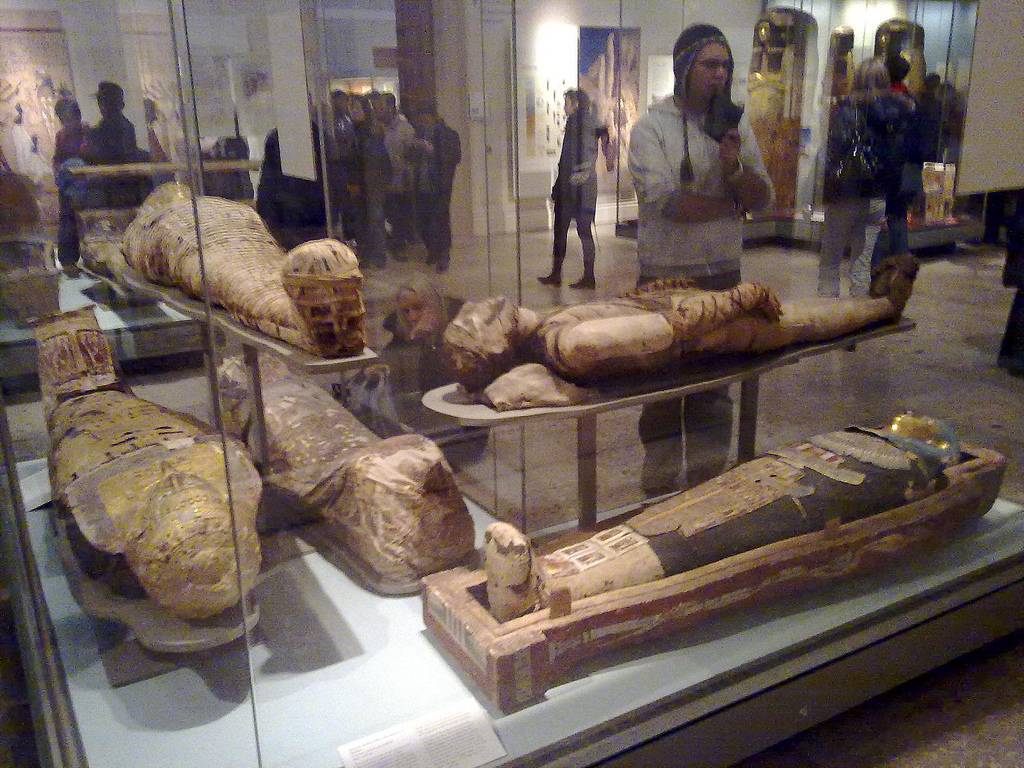
Rooms 62 to 63: Mummies on display in the Egyptian Death and Afterlife galleries

The seven permanent Egyptian galleries at the British Museum, which include its largest exhibition space (Room 4, for monumental sculpture), can display only 4% of its Egyptian holdings. The second-floor galleries have a selection of the museum's collection of 140 mummies and coffins, the largest outside Cairo. A high proportion of the collection comes from tombs or contexts associated with the cult of the dead, and it is these pieces, in particular the mummies, that remain among the most eagerly sought after exhibits by visitors to the museum.

== Collections ==
Key highlights of the collections include the following:

Predynastic and Early Dynastic period (c. 6000 BC – c. 2690 BC)

- Mummy of Ginger from Gebelein (c. 3400 BC)
- Flint knife with an ivory handle (known as the Pit-Rivers Knife), Sheikh Hamada, Egypt (c. 3100 BC)
- The Battlefield Palette and Hunters Palette, two cosmetic palettes with complex decorative schemes (c. 3100 BC)
- Ivory statuette of a king, from the early temple at Abydos, Egypt (c. 3000 BC)
- King Den's sandal label from Abydos, mid-1st Dynasty (c. 2985 BC)
- Stela of King Peribsen, Abydos (c. 2720–2710 BC)

Old Kingdom (2690–2181 BC)

- Artefacts from the tomb of King Khasekhemwy from the 2nd Dynasty (2690 BC)
- Granite statue of Ankhwa, the shipbuilder, Saqqara, Egypt, 3rd Dynasty (around 2650 BC)
- Several of the original casing stones from the Great Pyramid of Giza, one of the Seven Wonders of the Ancient World (c. 2570 BC)
- Statue of Nenkheftka from Dishasha, 4th Dynasty (2500 BC)
- Limestone false door of Ptahshepses (2380 BC)
- Wooden tomb statue of Tjeti, 5th to 6th Dynasty (about 2345–2181 BC)

Middle Kingdom (2134–1690 BC)

- Inner and outer coffin of Sebekhetepi, Beni Hasan (about 2125–1795 BC)
- Limestone stela of Heqaib, Abydos, Egypt, 12th Dynasty (1990–1750 BC)
- Quartzite statue of Ankhrekhu, 12th Dynasty (1985–1795 BC)
- Granite statue of Senwosret III (1850 BC)
- Block statue and stela of Sahathor, 12th Dynasty, reign of Amenemhat II (about 1922–1878 BC)
- Limestone statue and stelae from the offering chapel of Inyotef, Abydos, 12th Dynasty (about 1920 BC)

New Kingdom (1549–1069 BC)

- Schist head of Pharaoh Hatshepsut or her successor Tuthmosis III (1480 BC)
- Fragment of the beard of the Great Sphinx of Giza (14th century BC)
- Colossal head from a statue of Amenhotep III (1350 BC)
- Colossal limestone bust of Amenhotep III (1350 BC)
- Amarna Tablets, 99 out of 382 tablets found, second greatest collection in the world after the Vorderasiatisches Museum, Berlin (203 tablets) (1350 BC)
- List of the kings of Egypt from the Temple of Ramesses II (1250 BC)

Third Intermediate Period (1069–664 BC)

- Statue of the Nile god Hapi, Karnak (c.900 BC)
- Mummy case and coffin of Nesperennub, Thebes (c.800 BC)
- Shabaka Stone from Memphis, Egypt, 25th Dynasty (around 700 BC)
- Statue of Amun in the form of a ram protecting King Taharqa (683 BC)
- Inner and outer coffins of the priest Hor, Deir el-Bahari, Thebes, 25th Dynasty (about 680 BC)
- Granite statue of the Sphinx of Taharqo (680 BC)

Late Period (664–332 BC)

- Saite Sarcophagus of Sasobek, the vizier (prime minister) of the northern part of Egypt in the reign of Psammetichus I (664–610 BC)
- Bronze figure of Isis and Horus, North Saqqara, Egypt (600 BC)
- Sarcophagus of Hapmen, Cairo, 26th Dynasty or later (600–300 BC)
- Kneeling statue of Wahibre, from near Lake Mariout (530 BC)
- Sarcophagus of Ankhnesneferibre (525 BC)
- Obelisks and sarcophagus of Pharaoh Nectanebo II (360–343 BC)

Ptolemaic dynasty (305–30 BC)

- The famous Rosetta Stone, trilingual stela that unlocked the ancient Egyptian civilisation (196 BC)
- Giant sculpture of a scarab beetle (32–30 BC)
- Fragment of a basalt Egyptian-style statue of Ptolemy I Soter (305–283 BC)
- Mummy of Hornedjitef (inner coffin), Thebes (3rd century BC)
- Wall from a chapel of Queen Shanakdakhete, Meroë (c. 150 BC)
- Naos of Ptolemy VII, Philae (c. 150 BC)

Roman Period (30 BC – 641 AD)

- Schist head of a young man, Alexandria (after 30 BC)
- The Meriotic Hamadab Stela from the Kingdom of Kush found near the ancient site of Meroë in Sudan, 24 BC
- Lid of the coffin of Soter and Cleopatra from Qurna, Thebes (early 2nd century AD)
- Mummy of a youth with a portrait of the deceased, Hawara (100–200 AD)
- Bronze lamp and patera from the X-group tombs, Qasr Ibrim (1st–6th centuries AD)
- Coptic wall painting of the martyrdom of saints, Wadi Sarga (6th century AD)

== Gallery ==
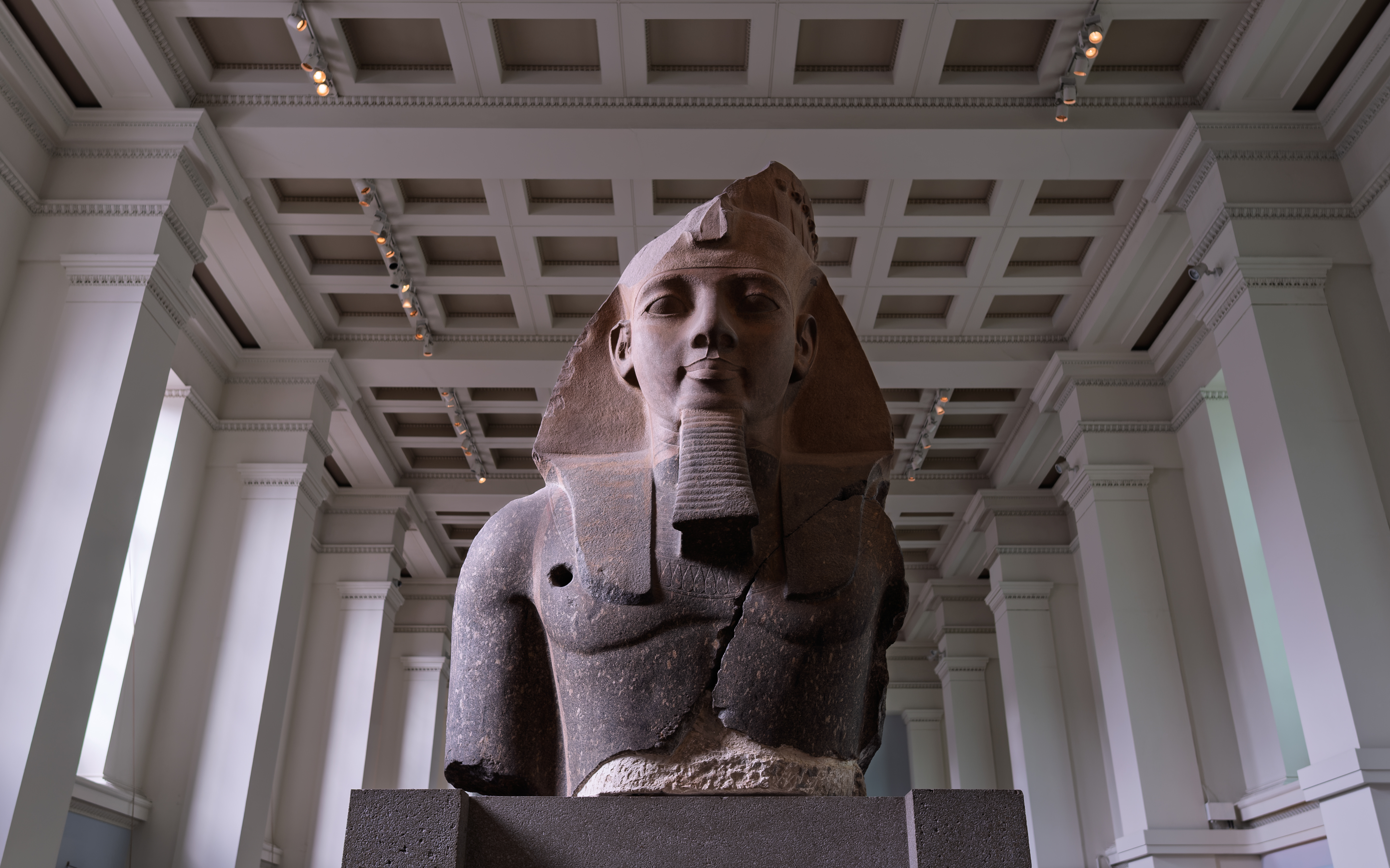
Bust of Ramses II

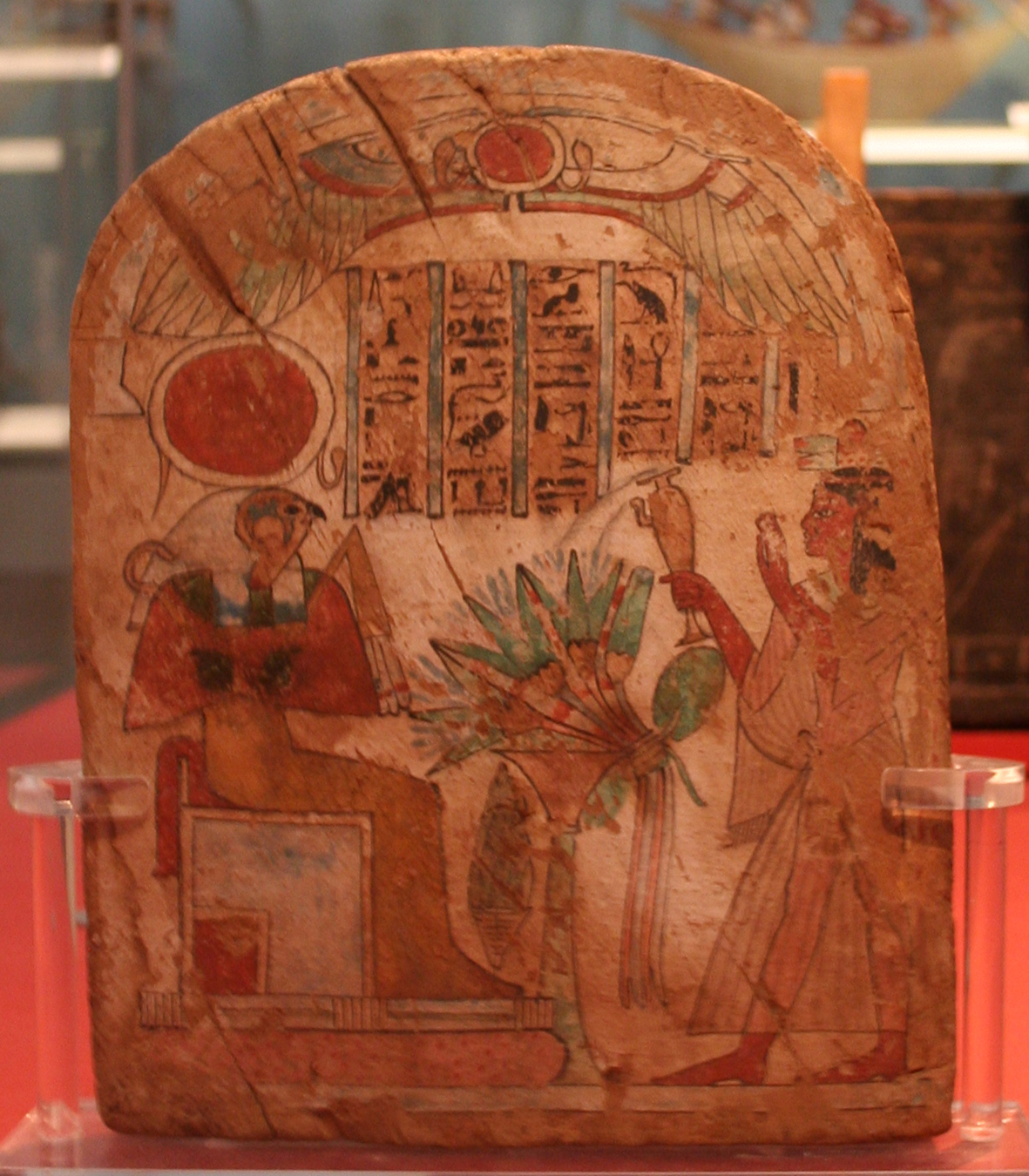
Wooden stela on display

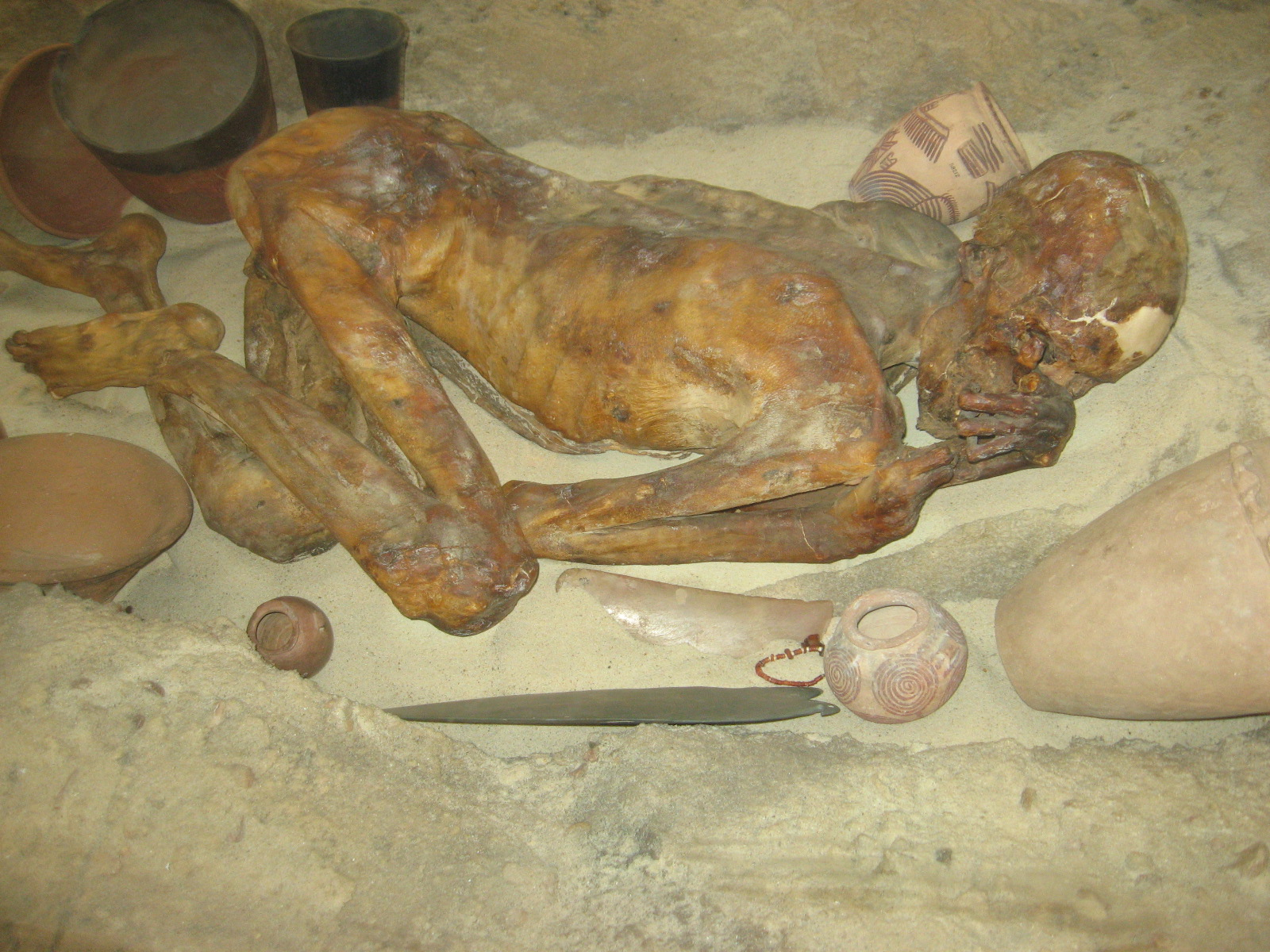
Room 64 - Egyptian grave containing a Gebelein predynastic mummy, late predynastic, 3400 BC

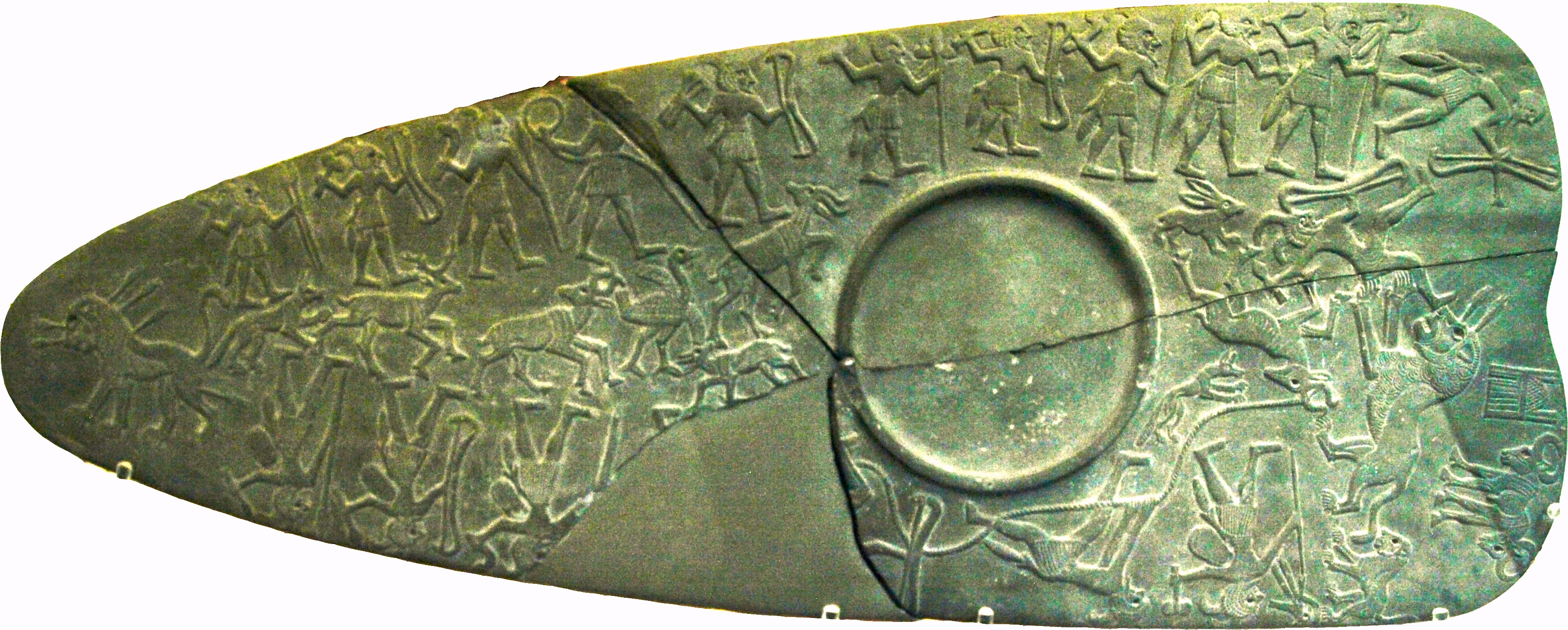
Room 64 - Fragmentary ceremonial palette known as the Hunters Palette, from the late predynastic period, Naqada III, c. 3250–3100 BC

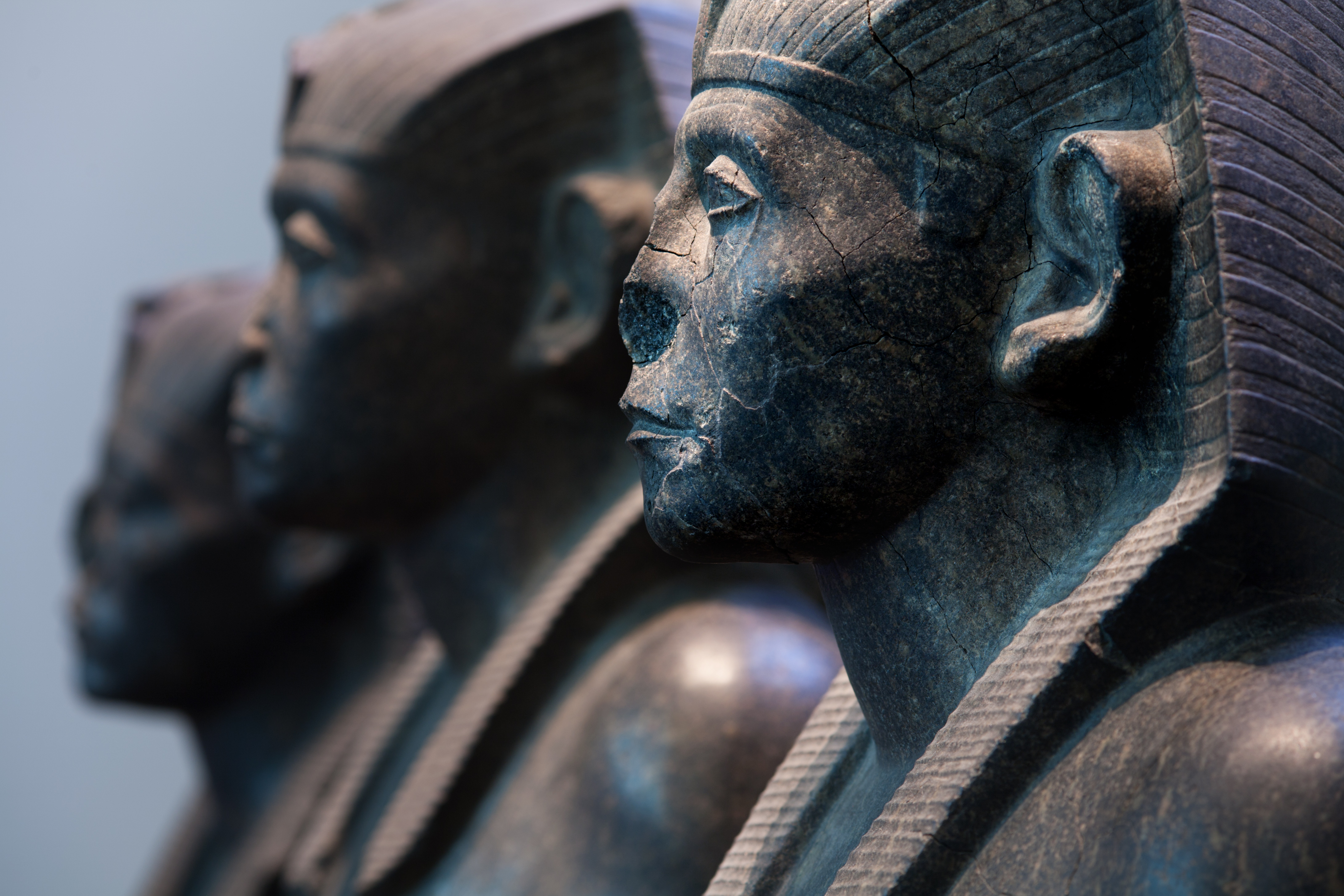
Room 4 - Three black granite statues of the pharaoh Senusret III, c. 1850 BC

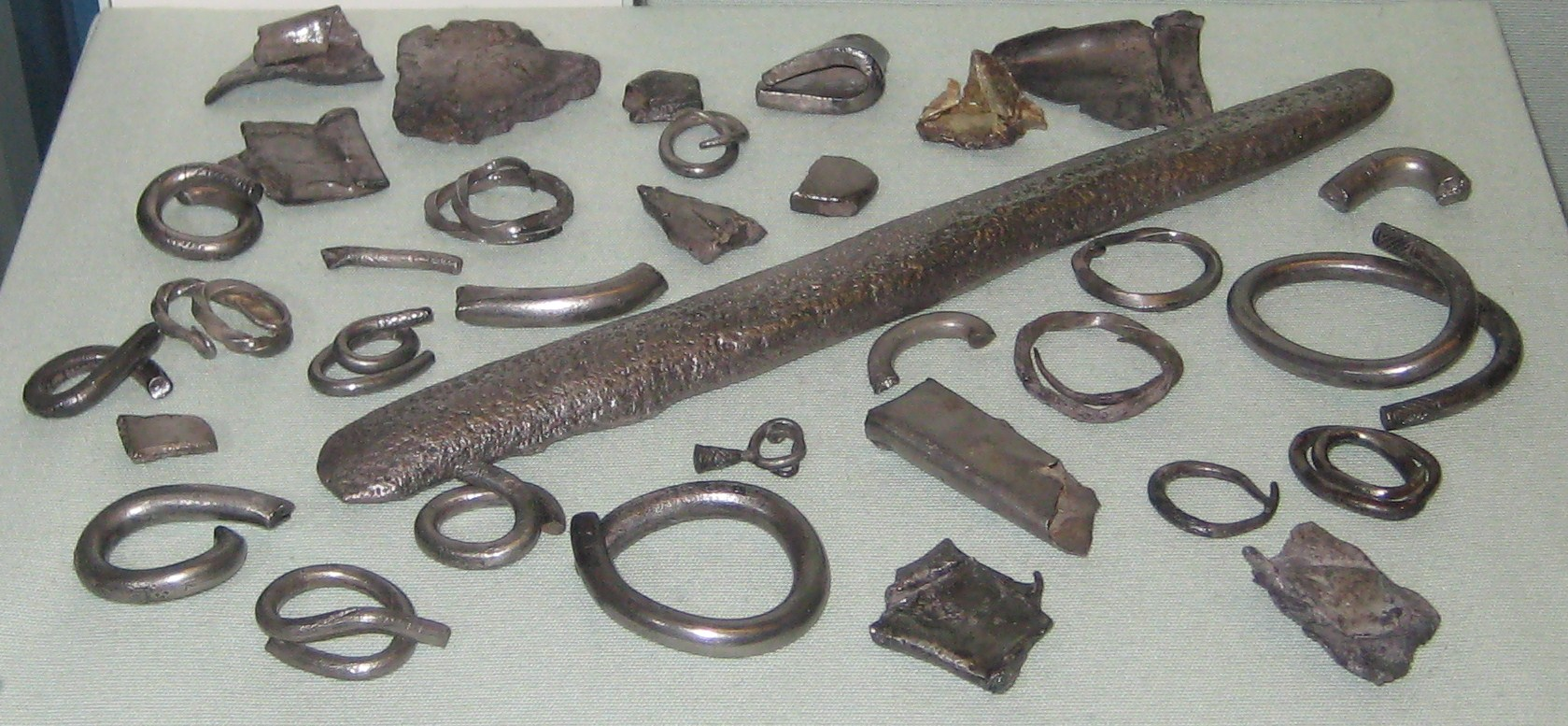
Room 68 - Part of the el-Amarna hoard, Egypt, c. 1850–1800 BC (18th dynasty)

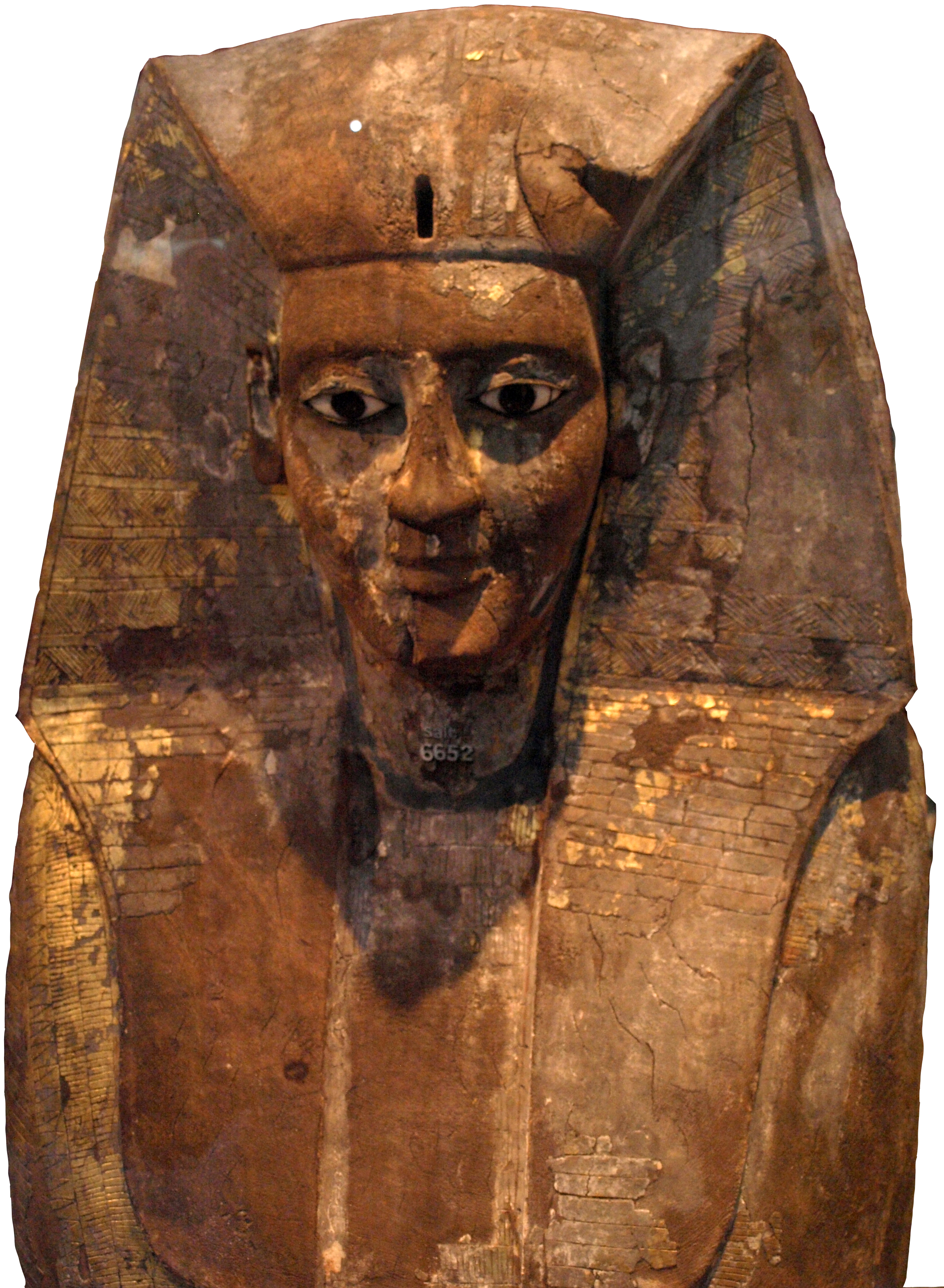
Room 63 - Wooden coffin of pharaoh Nubkheperre Intef of Egypt's 17th dynasty, 1600 BC

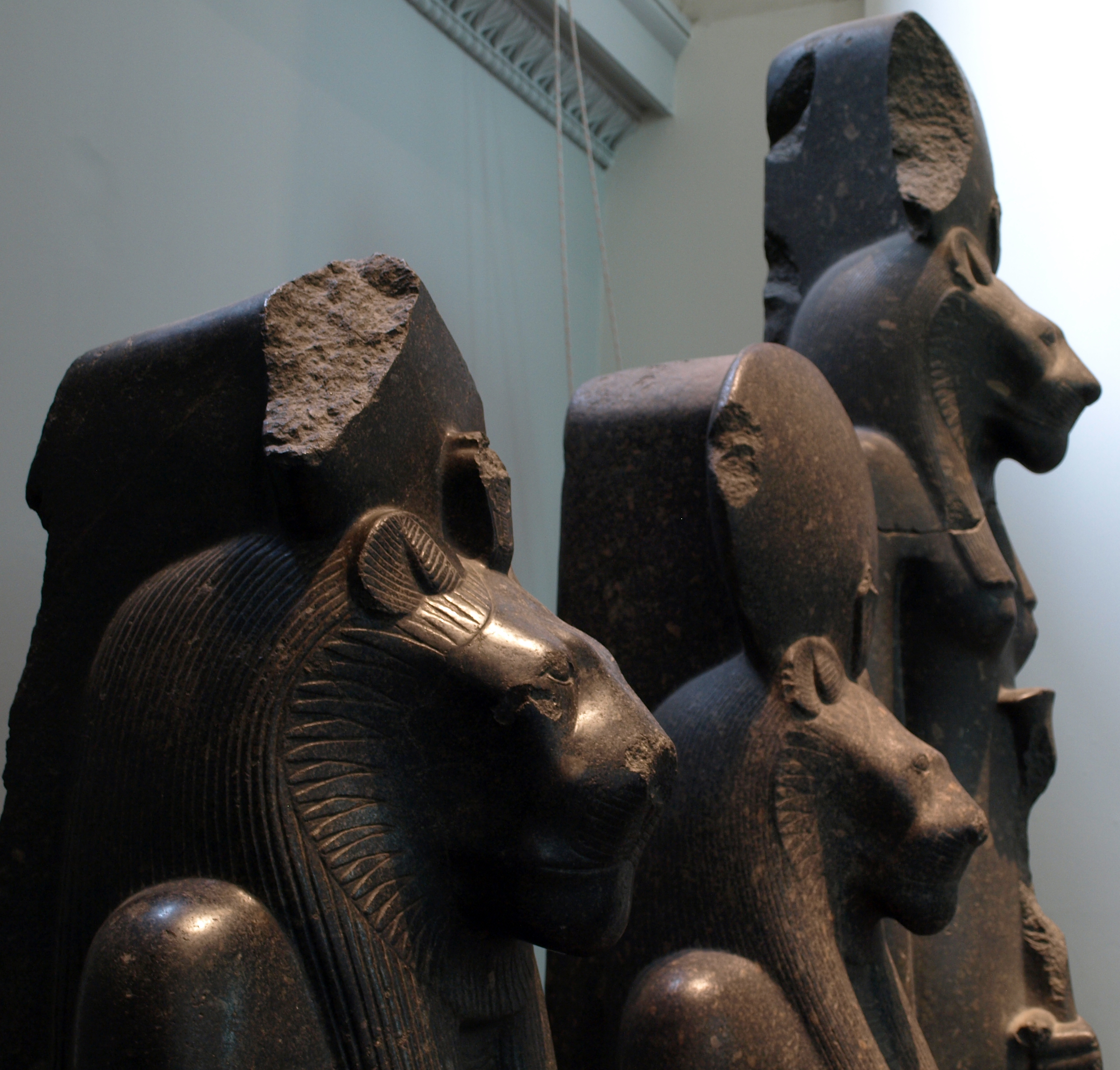
Room 4 - Three black granite statues of the goddess Sakhmet, c. 1400 BC

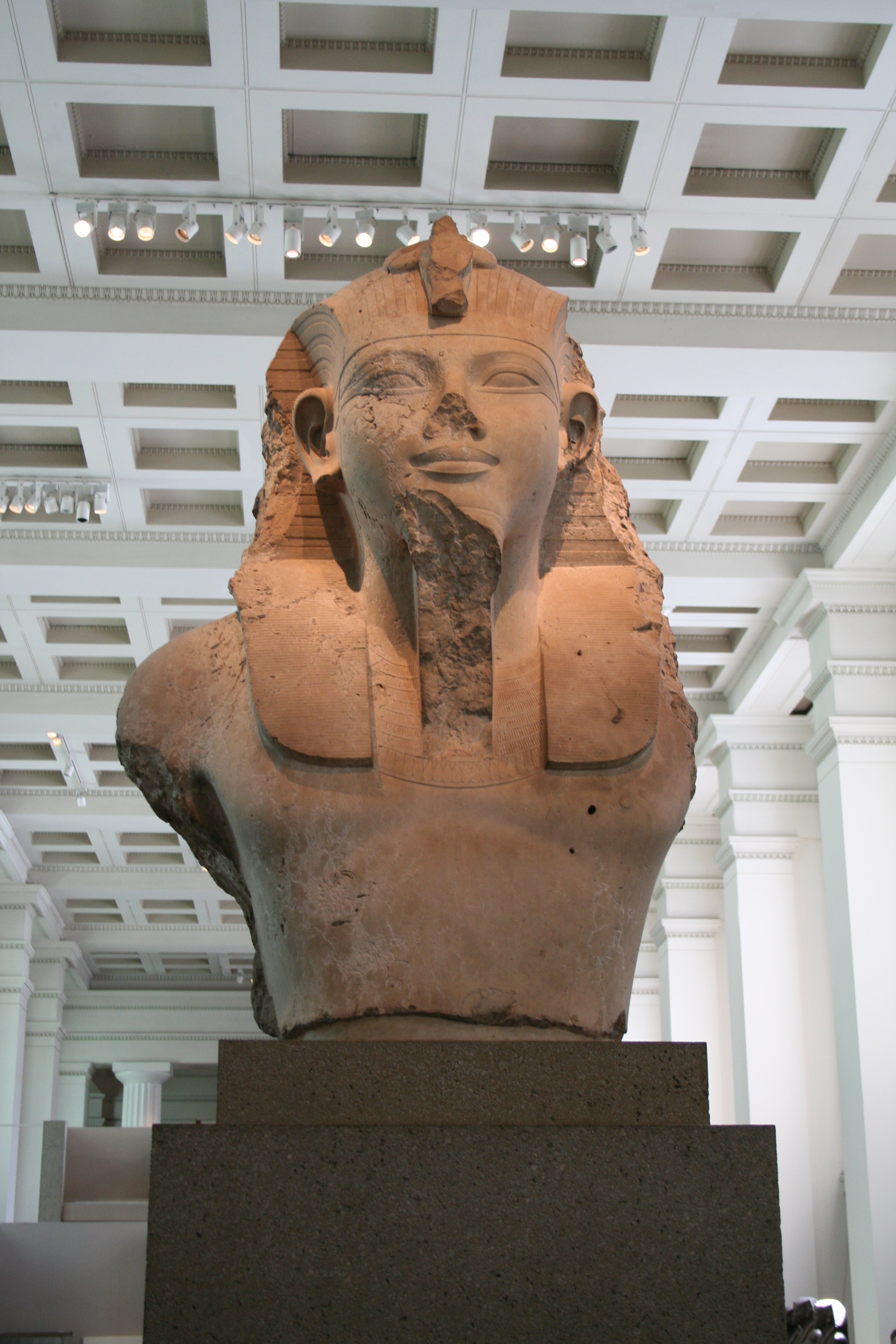
Room 4 - Colossal statue of Amenhotep III, c. 1370 BC

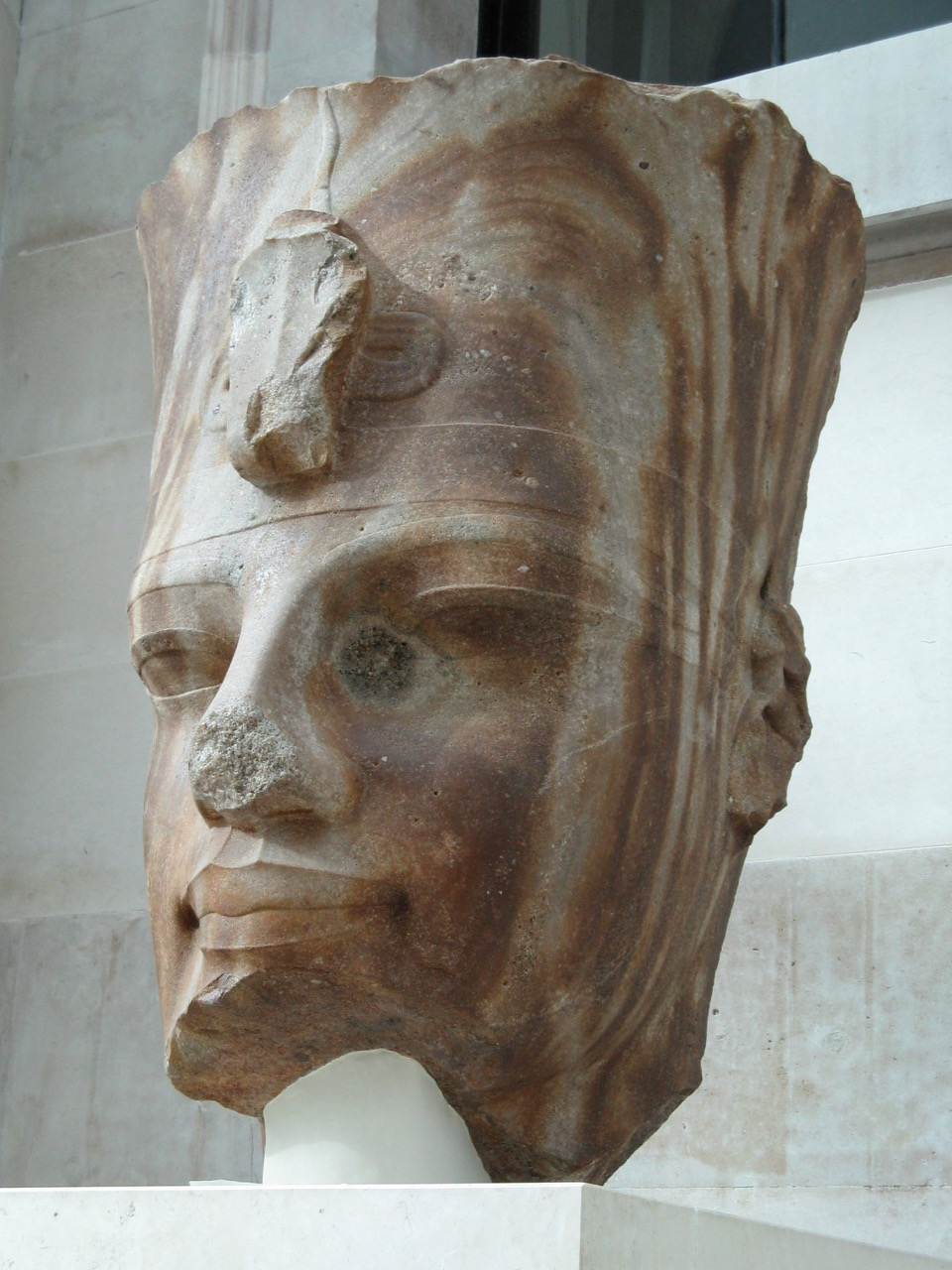
Great Court - Colossal quartzite statue of Amenhotep III, c. 1350 BC

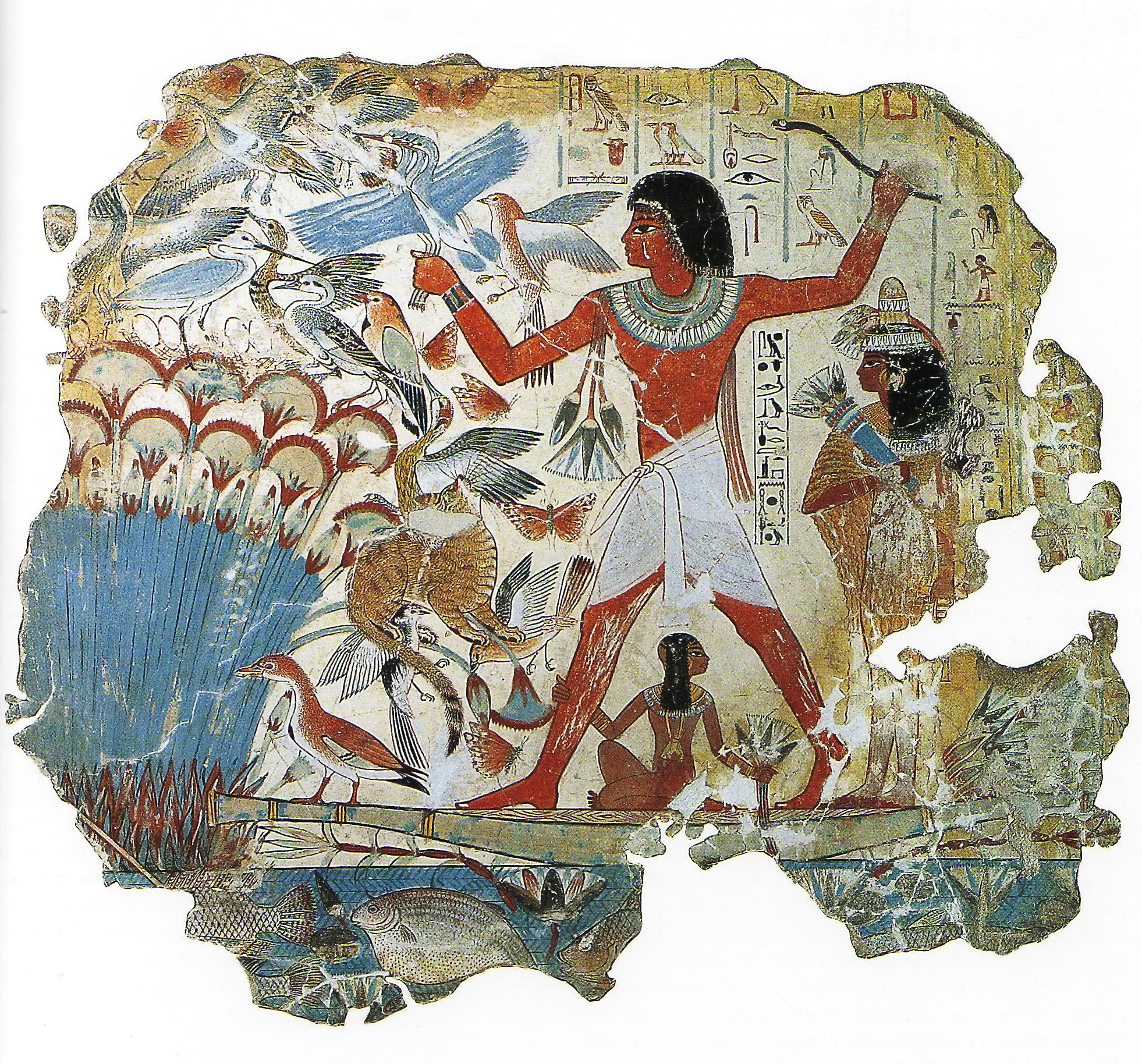
Room 61 - The famous false fresco 'Pond in a Garden' from the Tomb of Nebamun, c. 1350 BC

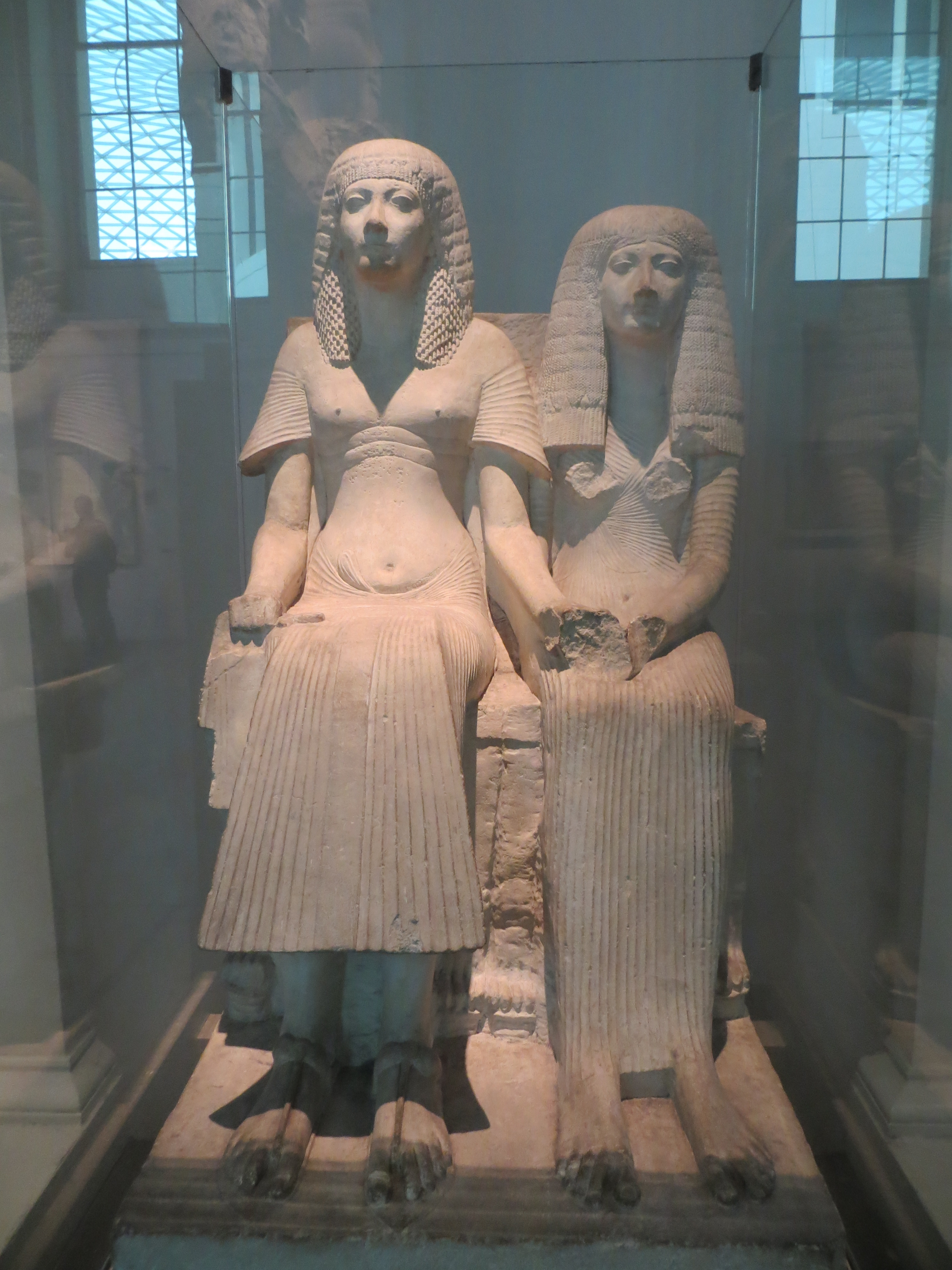
Room 4 - Limestone statue of Horemheb and Amenia, 1300–1250 BC

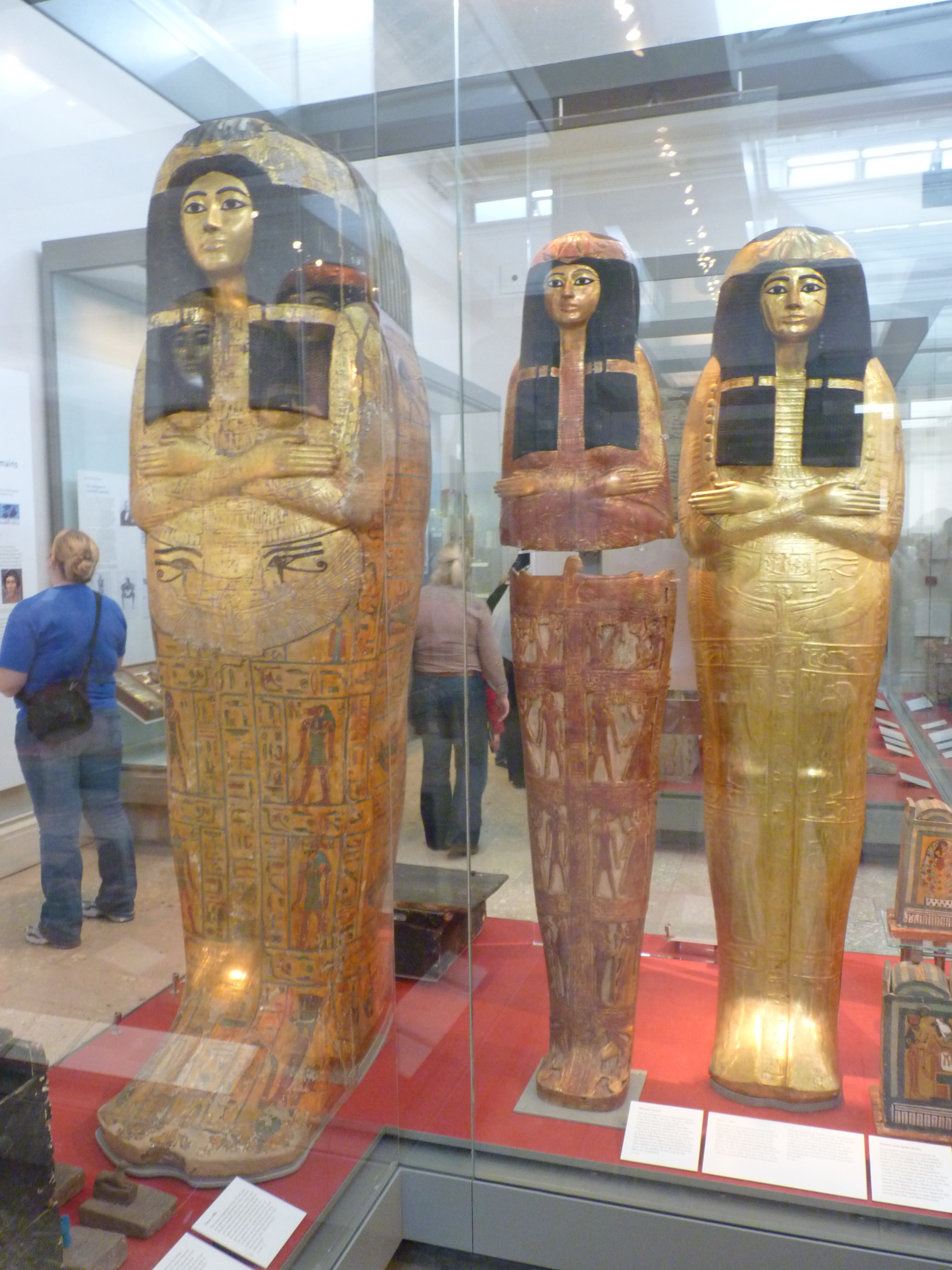
Room 63 - Gilded outer coffins from the tomb of Henutmehyt, Thebes, Egypt, 19th Dynasty, 1250 BC

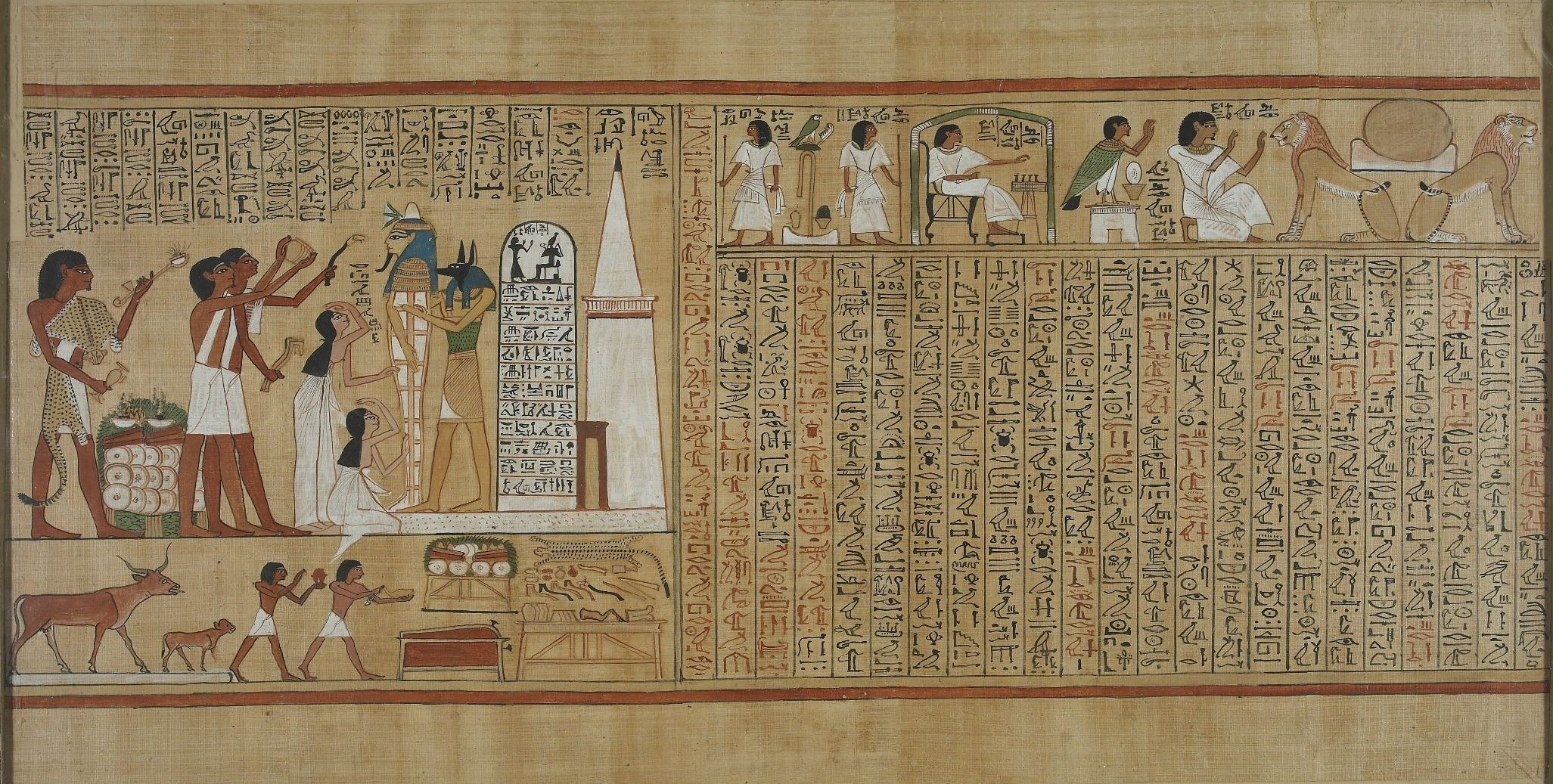
Book of the Dead of Hunefer, sheet 5, 19th Dynasty, 1250 BC

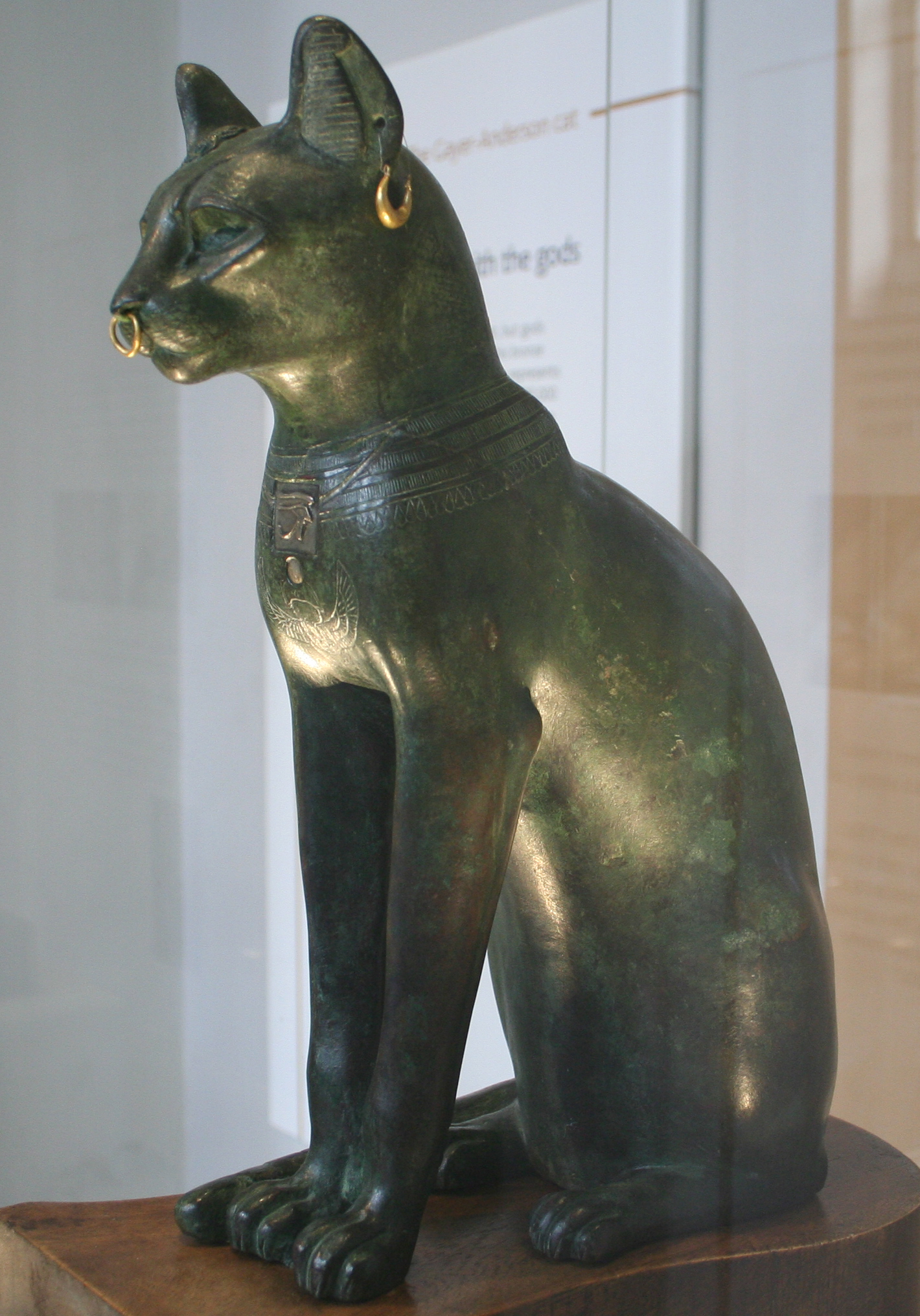
Room 4 - Ancient Egyptian bronze statue of a cat from the Late Period, about 664–332 BC

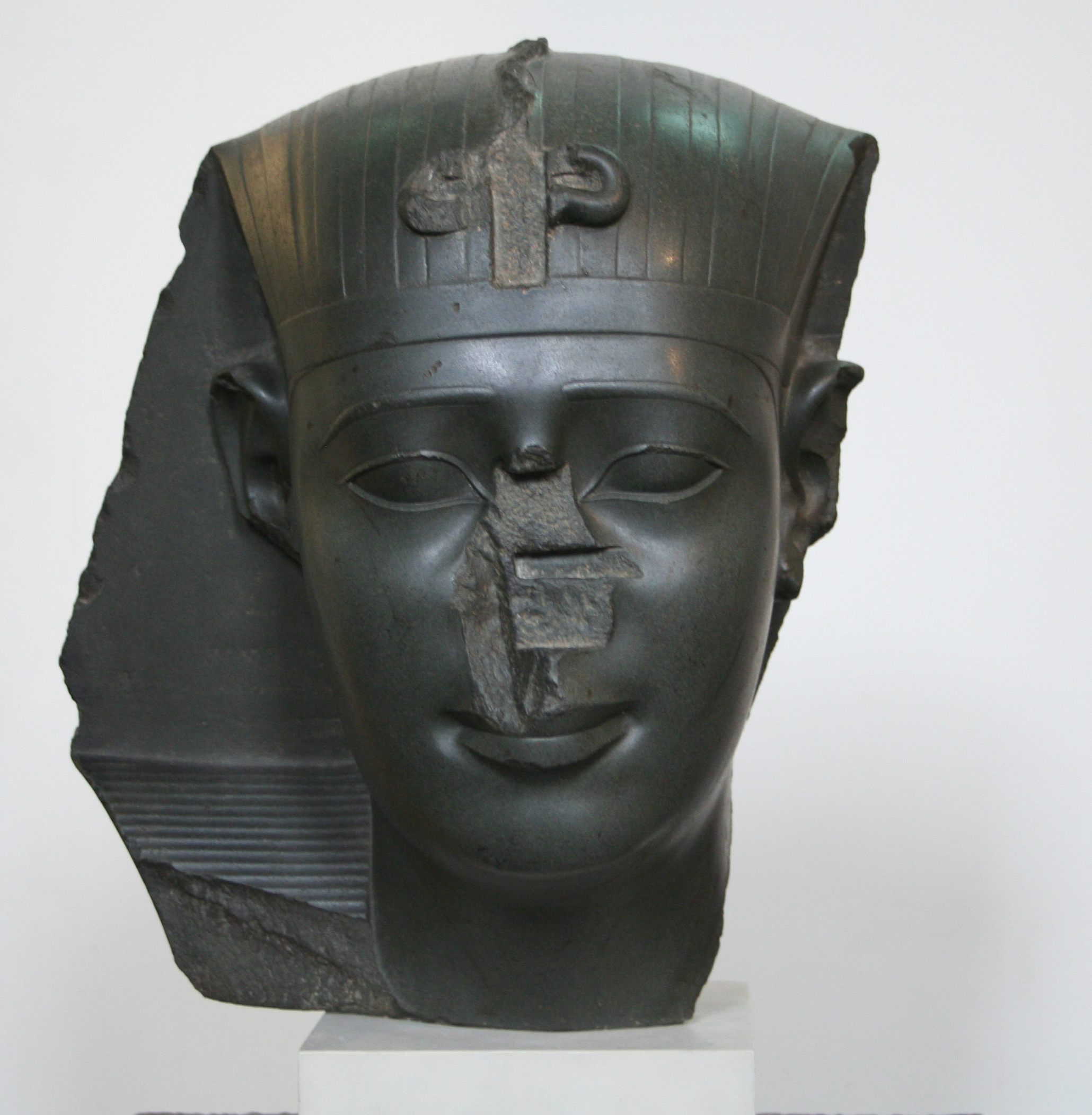
Room 4 - Green siltstone head of a Pharaoh, 26th–30th Dynasty, 600–340 BC

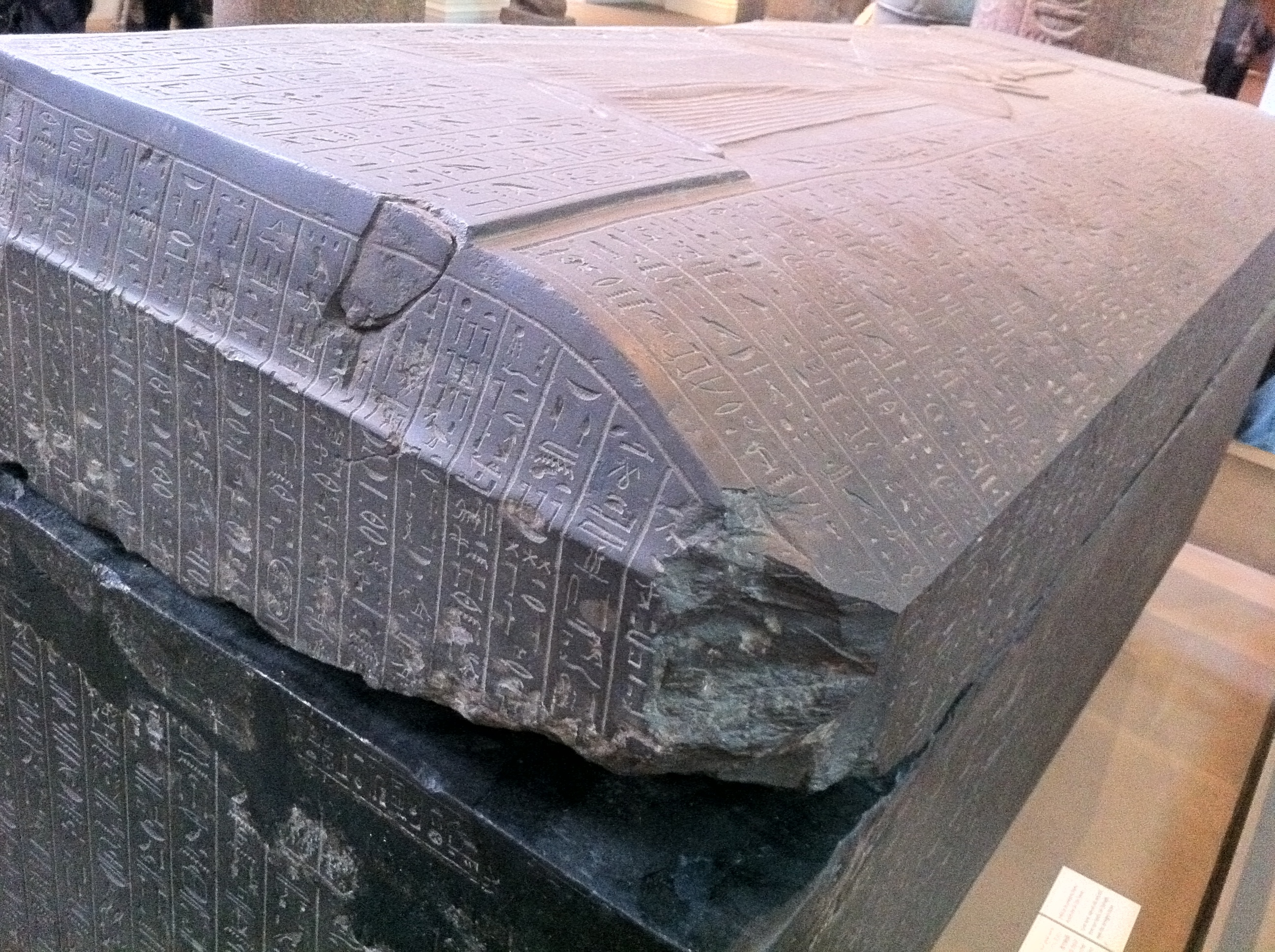
Room 4 - Sarcophagus of Ankhnesneferibre, 26th dynasty, about 530 BC

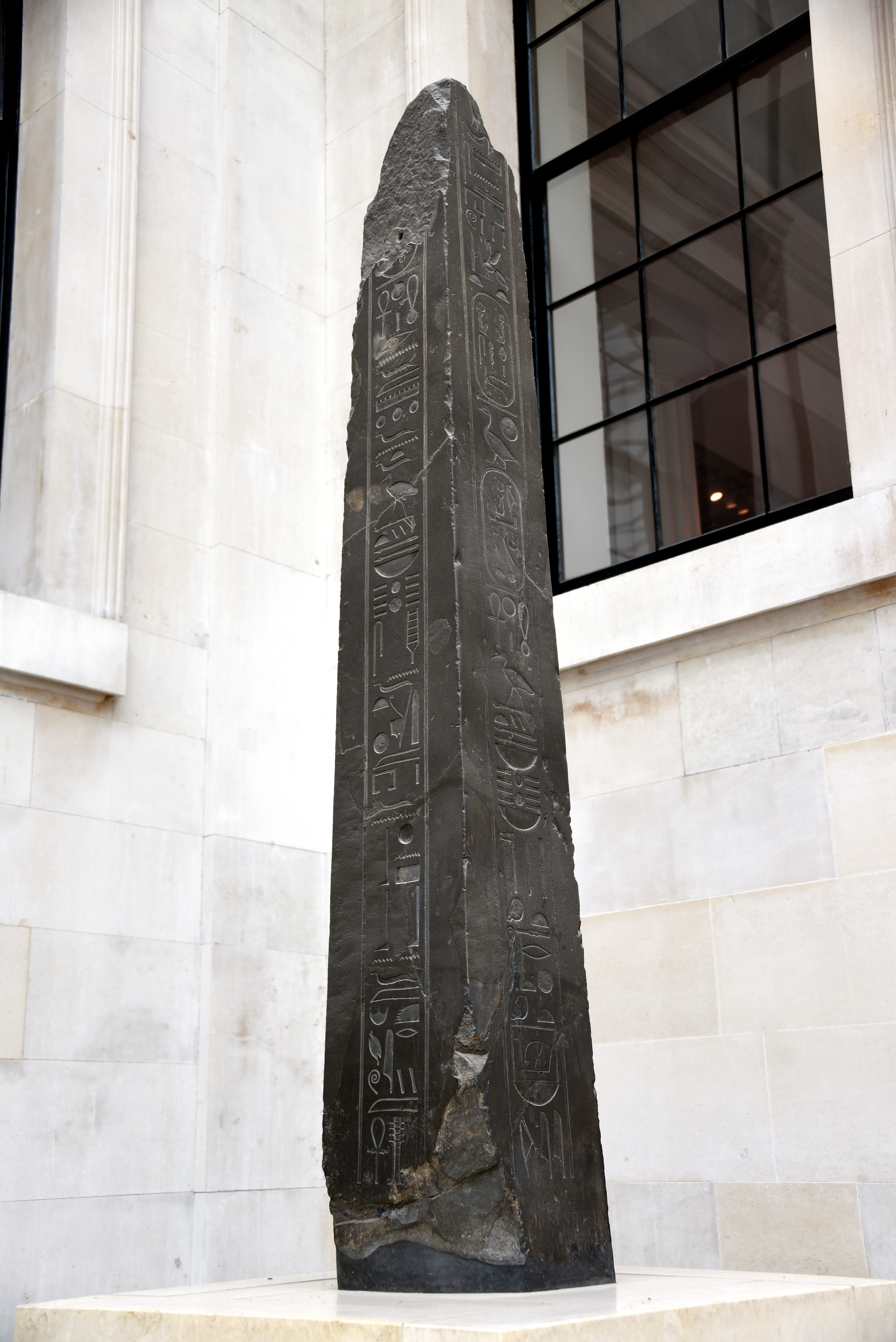
Great Court - Black siltstone obelisk of King Nectanebo II of Egypt, Thirtieth dynasty, about 350 BC

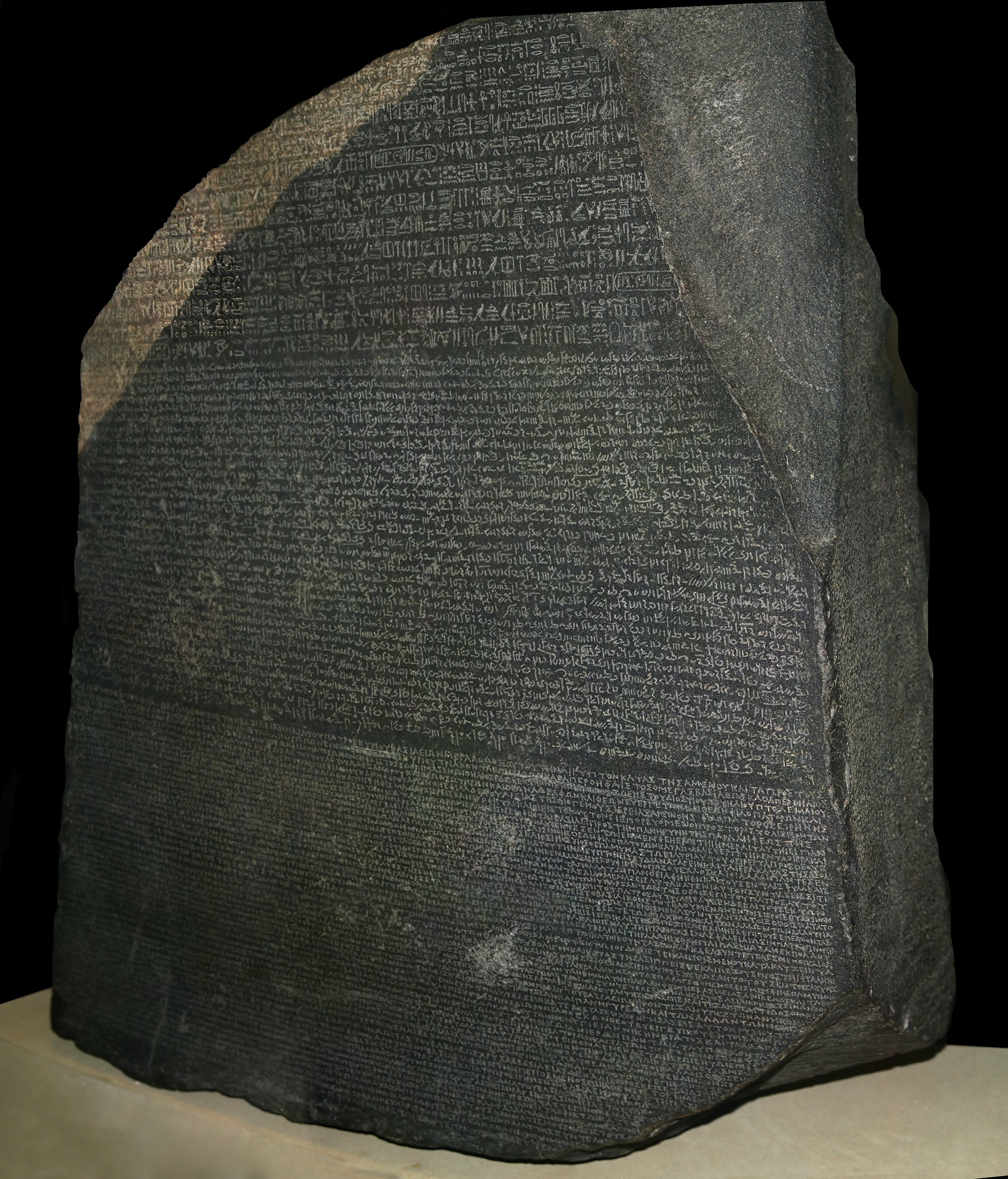
Room 4 - The Rosetta Stone, key to the decipherment of Egyptian hieroglyphs, 196 BC

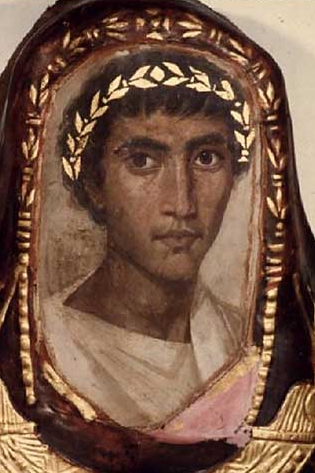
Room 62 - Detail from the mummy case of Artemidorus the Younger, a Greek who had settled in Thebes, Egypt, during Roman times, 100–200 AD
