= Statue of Horemheb and Amenia =

Double statue of the Pharaoh Horemheb and his wife Amenia

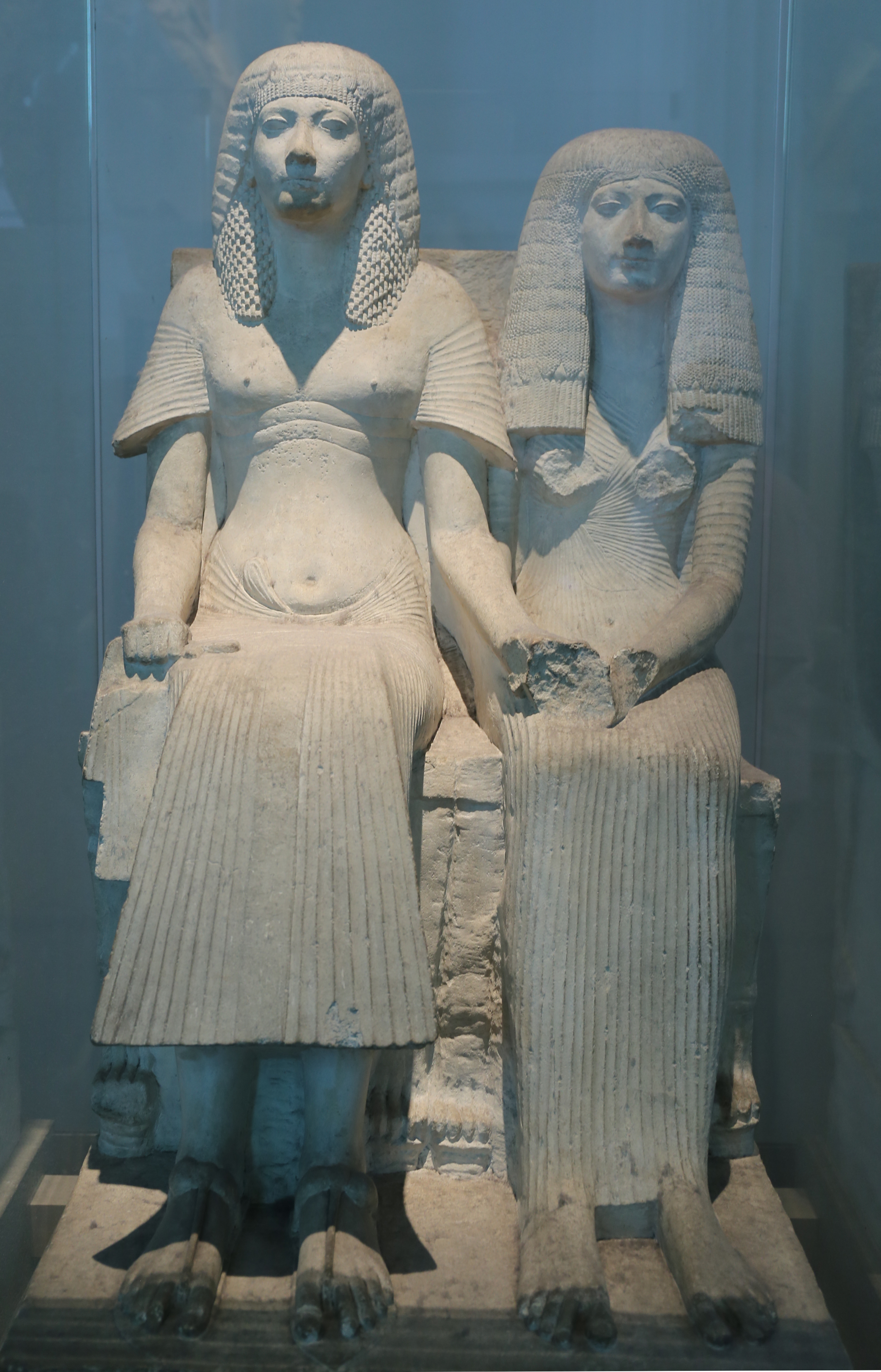
- Statue of Horemheb and Amenia
- Material: Limestone
- Size: 130 cm (4 ft 3 in) in height
- Created: c.1300 BC
- Present location: British Museum, London
- Registration: EA36

The Statue of Horemheb and Amenia is a large double statue of the Pharaoh Horemheb and his first wife Amenia that was found at the ancient site of Saqqara in Egypt. Now kept at the British Museum, for many years the identity of the two sitters was unknown until a team of Dutch and British archaeologists discovered a missing fragment of the statue in Horemheb's tomb in Saqqara.

== Discovery ==
The statue was acquired by the British Museum in 1839 from the Anastasi collection. The original provenance of this object was ascribed to either Thebes or Saqqara. However, scholarly opinion tended to favour Saqqara, as Anastasi was more active in the Memphite than the Theban area, and a group of similar double statues (the most famous being the statue of Maya and his wife in Leiden) come from tombs in the vicinity of that ancient site.

== Recent evidence ==
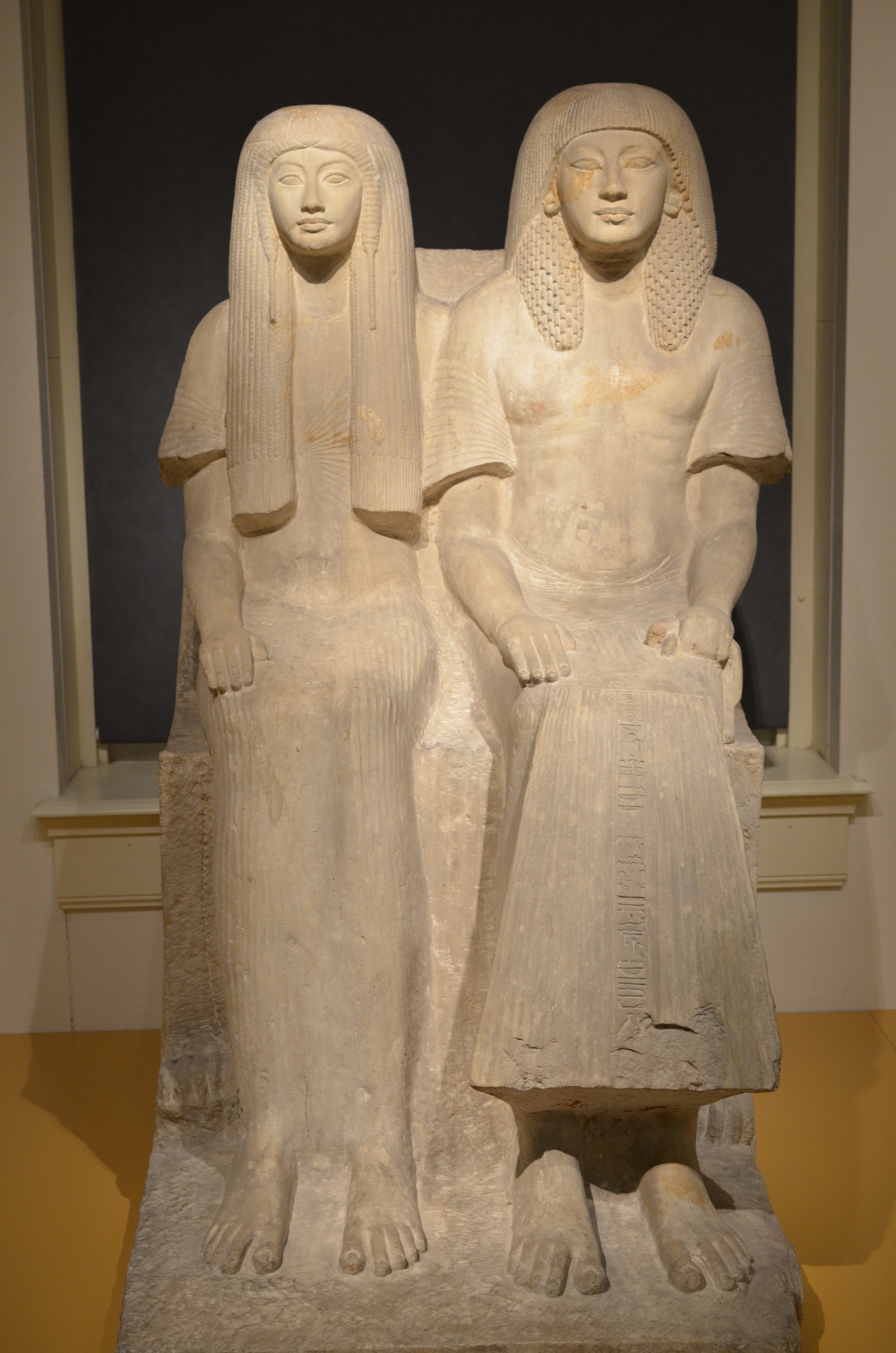
Similar style statue of Maya and Merit from Saqqara in the National Museum of Antiquities in Leiden

In 2009, concrete evidence was found that proved beyond reasonable doubt that the statue was that of Horemheb and his first wife Amenia, taken from their mortuary tomb in Saqqara. In 1976, a multinational team of excavators from the Netherlands and the United Kingdom found a missing piece from a statue in Horemheb's burial chamber that seemed to show three clasped hands. In 2009, a plaster cast was made of the clasped hands and shown to be a perfect match for the missing part of the British Museum's double statue.

== Description ==
The husband (Horemheb) and wife (Amenia) are seated upright on a throne with lion's legs. Both wear long tunics and wigs, which were fashionable in Eighteenth Dynasty Egypt. The man has baggy sleeves and sandals on his feet, thus depicting Horemheb from when he was still only an official. The double statue is very unusual in that it shows Amenia holding her husband's hand with both of hers. The statue would have originally been painted in bright colours, most of which have disappeared. Apart from minor damage to the hands and breasts, the statue is in near perfect condition, brilliantly conveying the serene elegance of Egyptian aristocracy in the New Kingdom. The double statue was also an inspiration to the English sculptor Henry Moore, who used it as a model for many of his bronze works.
