= Obelisks of Nectanebo II =

Ancient Egyptian artifacts (c. 350 BCE)

Coordinates: 51°31′10″N 0°7′37″W

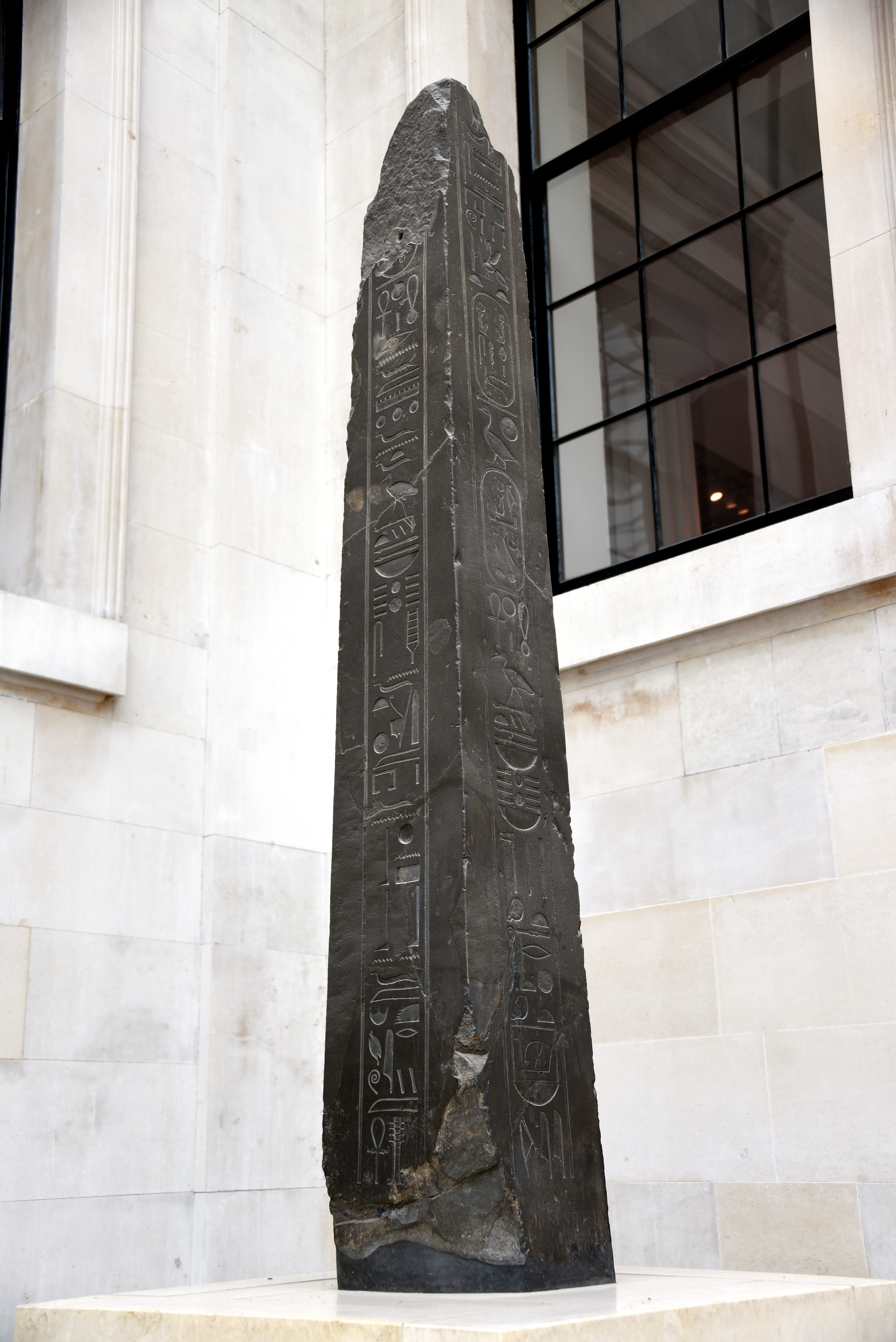
- The Nectanebo II Obelisks on display in the British Museum

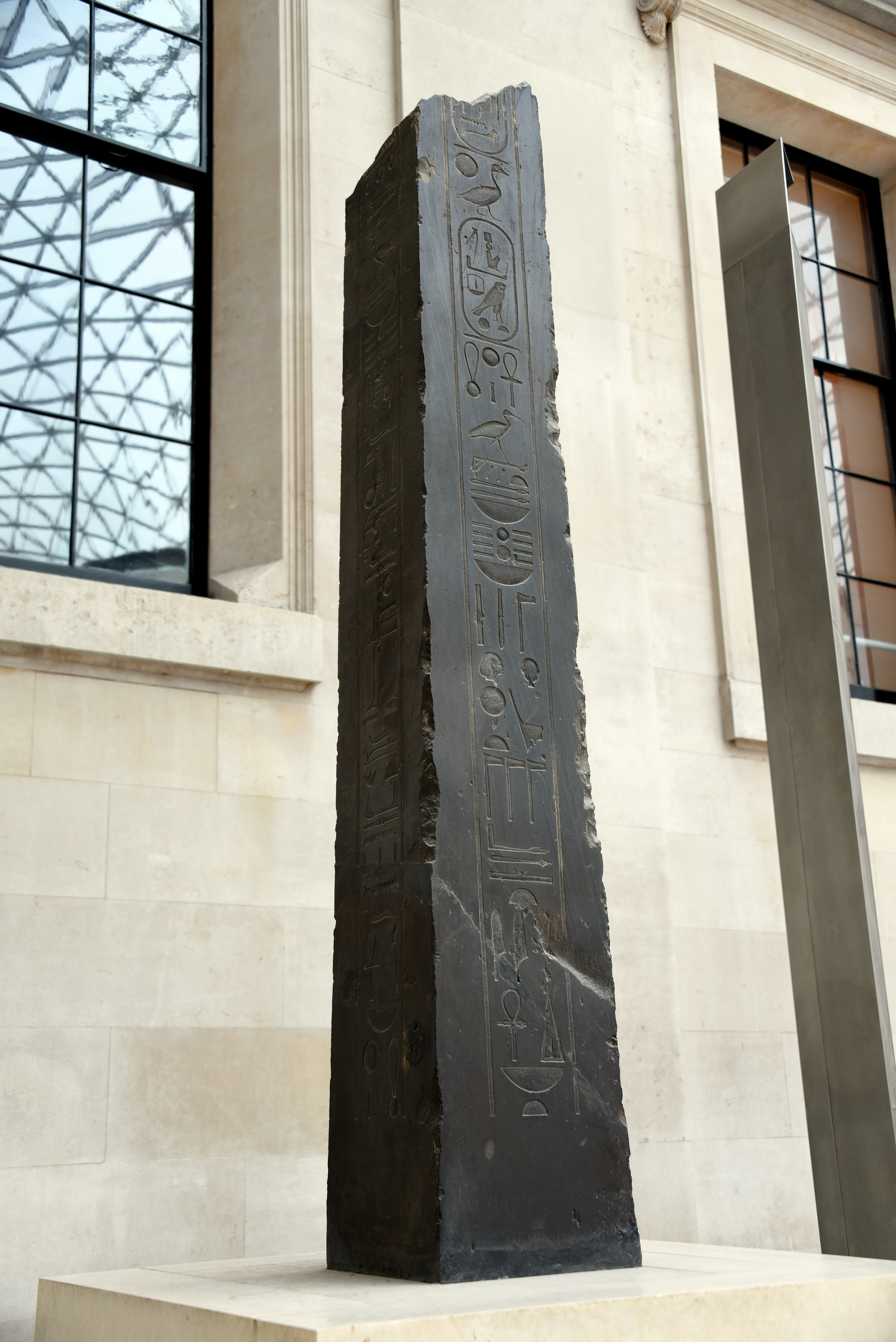
- Material: Black siltstone
- Size: 2.74 metres High
- Writing: ancient Egyptian
- Created: 350 BC
- Discovered: 1798
- Present location: British Museum, London
- Registration: EA 523 EA 524

The Obelisks of Nectanebo II are a pair of monumental obelisks that were found in Cairo during the period of Ottoman Egypt, but were originally erected in the ancient city of Hermopolis (modern Al-Ashmunayn), in central Egypt. The fragmentary monoliths were recovered by French scholars as part of Napoleon's 1798 expedition to Egypt but, after the capitulation of French forces, they were confiscated by the British, along with a number of antiquities including the Rosetta Stone, and transported to England. They can now be seen in the Great Court of the British Museum.

== Discovery ==
Both obelisks were re-discovered by European travellers in the eighteenth century. One was seen in Cairo by the English explorer Richard Pococke in 1737. The other was recorded by the Danish scientist Carsten Niebuhr in 1762. They were later transported to Alexandria by French forces, with the purpose of shipping them to France and exhibiting the finds at the Louvre. However, the French were defeated by the British in the Battle of the Nile and in the subsequent Treaty of Alexandria, all Egyptian antiquities collected by the French became the property of the British Crown. The obelisks, along with other objects including the Rosetta Stone, were then taken to England and presented to King George III, who in turn donated them to the British Museum in 1802.

== Description ==
The pair of obelisks were originally set up at a temple complex in Hermopolis, Middle Egypt, under the Thirtieth Dynasty reign of the Pharaoh Nectanebo II. This dynasty witnessed a renaissance in art and culture that had begun under its first King Nectanebo I. The two obelisks were probably erected on either side of a ramp leading to the entrance of a temple. They are fragmentary, with only half of them extant. A segment of one of the obelisks can be found in the Egyptian Museum, Cairo. The hieroglyphic inscriptions that envelope each monument record their dedication to the Egyptian god Thoth, who was the chief deity at Hermopolis.

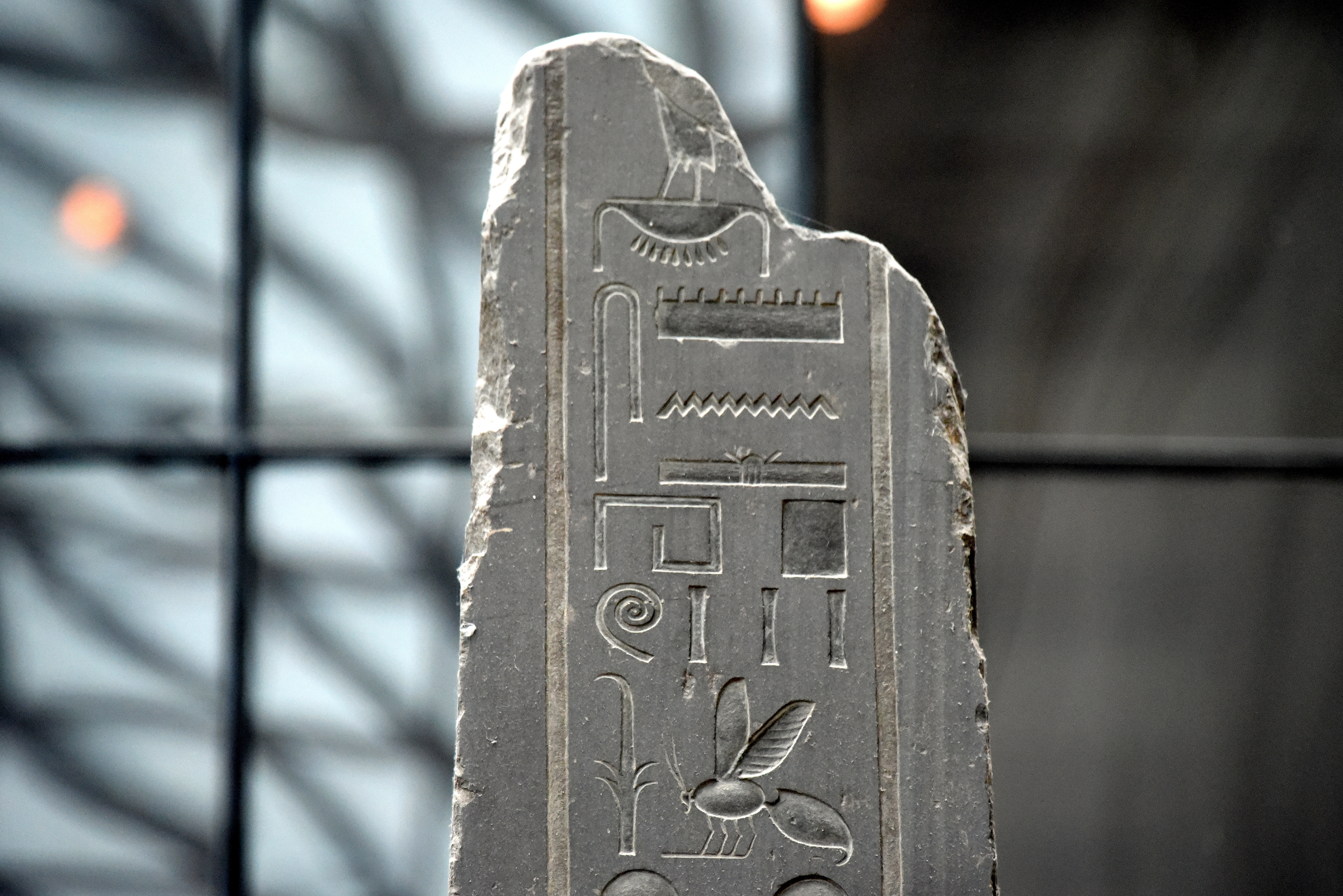
Black siltstone obelisk of Pharaoh Nectanebo II (c. 350 BCE), originally set up at the sanctuary of Thoth in Hermopolis. 30th Dynasty.

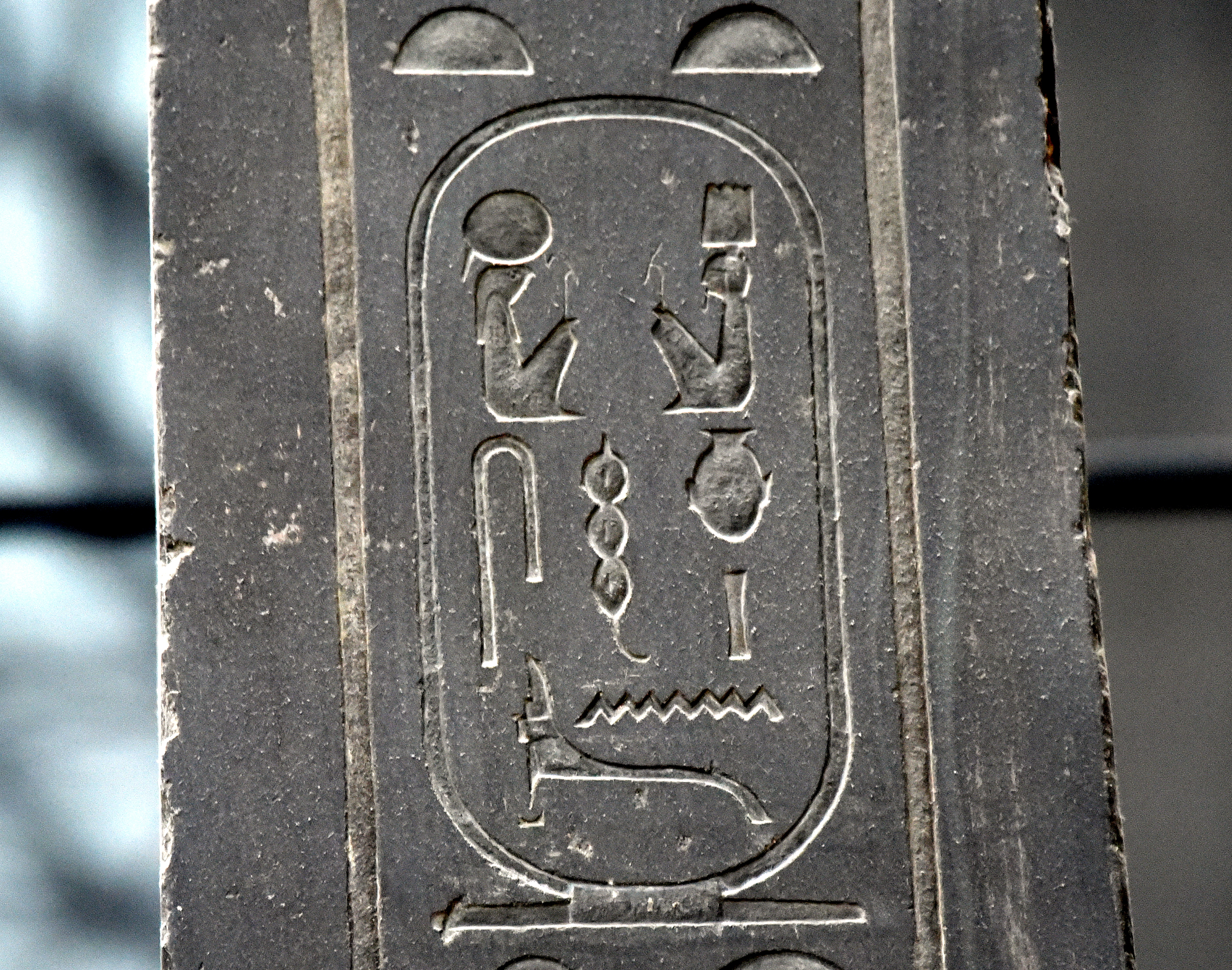
Throne name (prenomen) cartouche of Pharaoh Nectanebo II

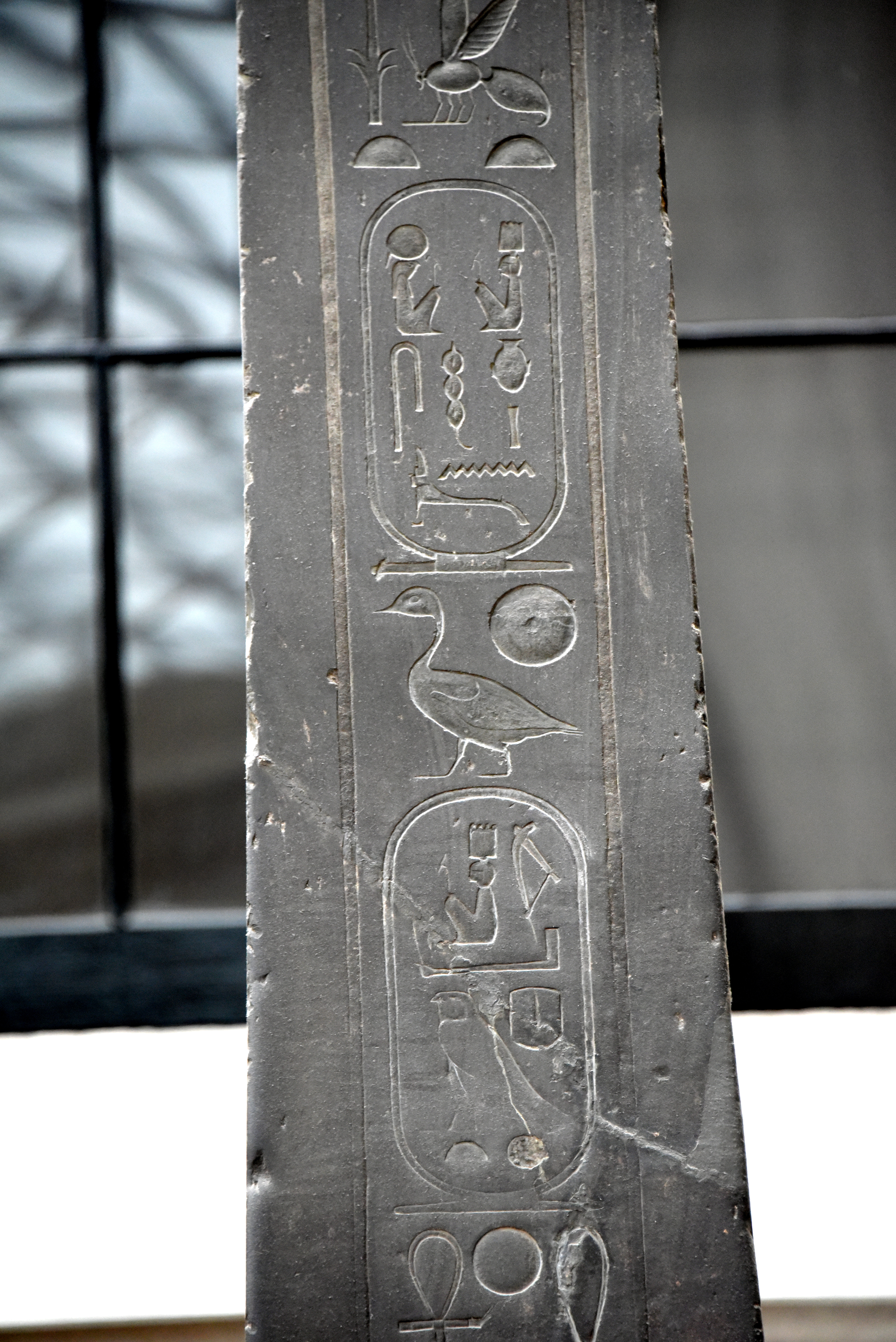
Prenomen and nomen

== See also ==
- List of Egyptian obelisks
