= Henutmehyt =

Ancient Egyptian priestess

Henutmehyt in hieroglyphs
H W10 t
mH
H t P5
Henutmehyt
- Priestess from the time of Ramesses II
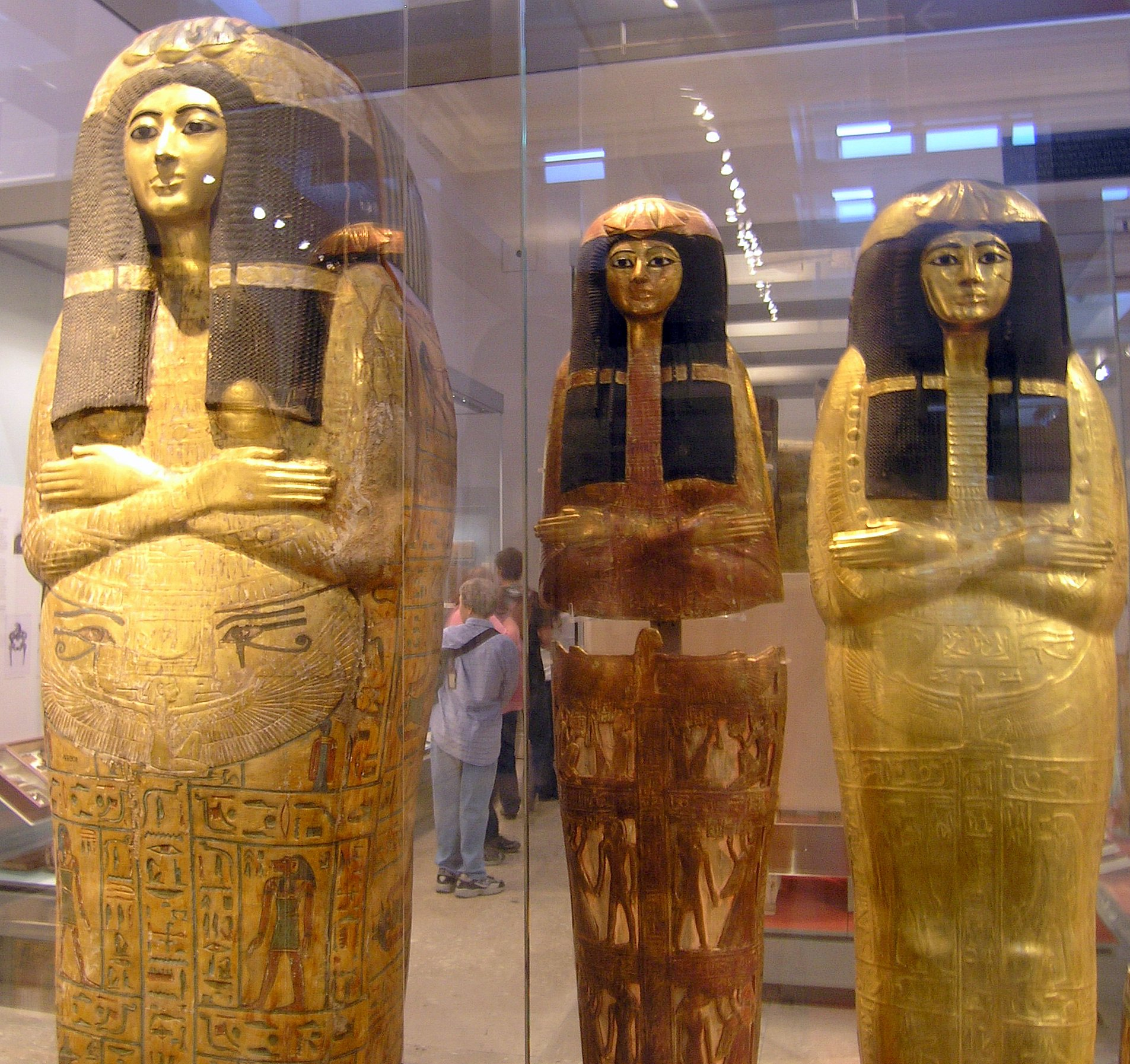
- The coffins of Henutmehyt at the British Museum.

Henutmehyt was the name of a Theban priestess of ancient Egypt, who lived during the 19th Dynasty, around 1250 BC. The excessive use of gold, and the high quality and detail of her coffins indicates that Henutmehyt was a wealthy woman.

== Funerary equipment ==
Henutmehyt was buried in a set of gilded coffins and a two-part gilded mummy-cover made of cedar of Lebanon and sycomore, which are now in the British Museum.The outer coffin is only partly gilded (yellow paint has been applied to mimic gold on the lower part of the lid). On the front of the coffin, the Sky-Goddess Nut spread her wings. The four sons of Horus, Isis and Nephthys occupy the compartments in the lower part of the lid. Grains of wheat and barley have been found embedded in the resin on the underside of the coffin. The reddish color of the mummy-cover could be due to tarnishing.

A wooden shabti box which was painted with a scene showing Henutmehyt adoring two of the canopic deities and receiving food and wine from the goddess Nut. There were four shabti boxes in total, containing a total of 40 brightly coloured shabtis made of both wood and pottery.

A funerary papyrus was included in her burial as well. The text is Spell 100 from the Book of the Dead (a spell about worthiness and permission to go aboard the bark of Ra) and is written rather unusually in red and white ink. The papyrus was placed over the outer wrappings of the mummy, as it should have been (spell 100 must be placed on the breast of the deceased without touching its flesh). These types of texts became more common after the New Kingdom.

Magic bricks made of unbaked mud must have been placed in niches in the burial chamber. Henutmehyt's magic bricks were well preserved. They supported amuletic figures: a Djed pillar, the figure of Anubis, a wooden mummiform figure, and a reed. The bricks themselves were inscribed with magic spells.

A wooden box, painted black and containing fowl wrapped in linen and meat possibly from a goat may also belong to the funerary equipment of Henutmehyt. The box contains enough food for a meal.
