= Khat (apparel) =

Head cloth worn by the nobility of Ancient Egypt

- Depiction of the khat

Details
- Country: Ancient Egypt
- Material: Linen

The khat was a head cloth worn in Ancient Egypt. It was similar to the nemes headdress, but did not have pleats or stripes like the nemes did.

The khat was worn by laborers while doing tasks such as winnowing grain. It was also worn by the king and by certain deities. It is strongly connected to the goddesses Isis, Nephthys, and Nut.

== History ==
The khat dates back to at least the reign of the First Dynasty king Den, as he is shown wearing the khat and brandishing a mace on an ivory label found at Abydos.

Extant examples were found in KV54, where materials from the embalming of Tutankhamun were cached, and others that belonged to Tutankhamun were found within his tomb. Additionally, the king's mummy wore a khat within the layers of wrappings; it was padded to the appropriate shape, and fitted with a gold browband and uraeus and vulture emblems.

== Construction ==
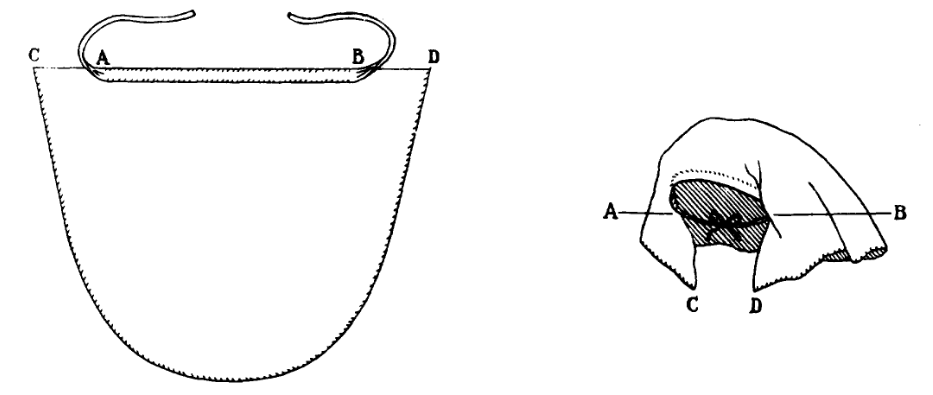
Illustration of the construction of Tutankhamun's khats

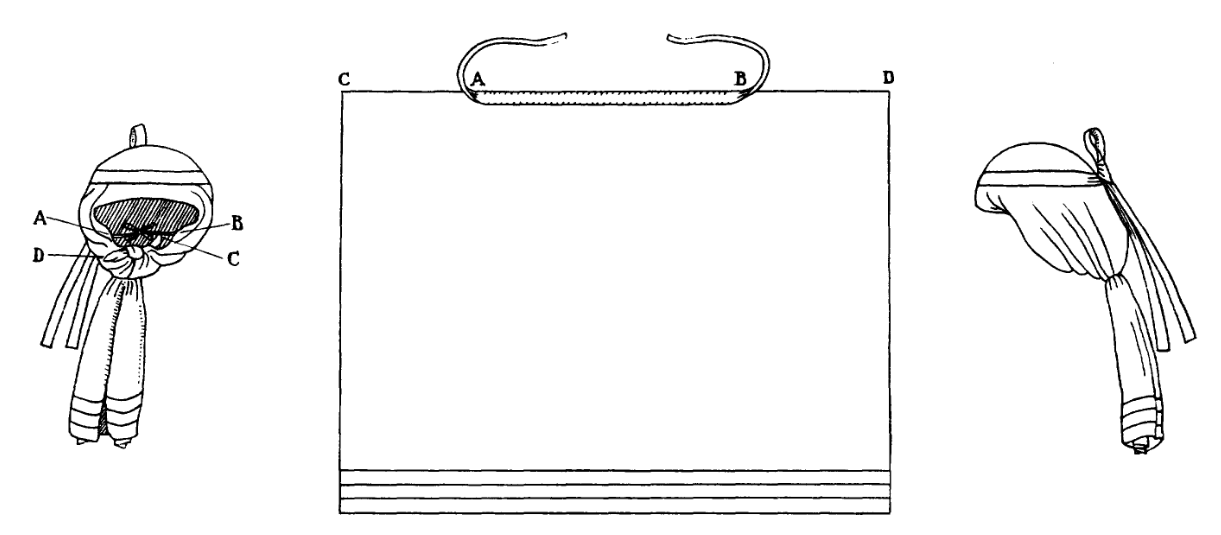
Illustration of the construction of a khat

The khat was made from a rectangular or semicircular piece of linen, likely with ties at the front. It could be secured with a headband and gathered and tied at the back of the head. In depictions of the khat, it could be white, red, or yellow, and an extant example that was dyed blue has been found.

== Gallery ==
Modern depiction of a king wearing a khat

Hery-Maat, a god depicted wearing a khat in the tomb of Khaemwaset (QV44) and the tomb of Tyti (QV52)

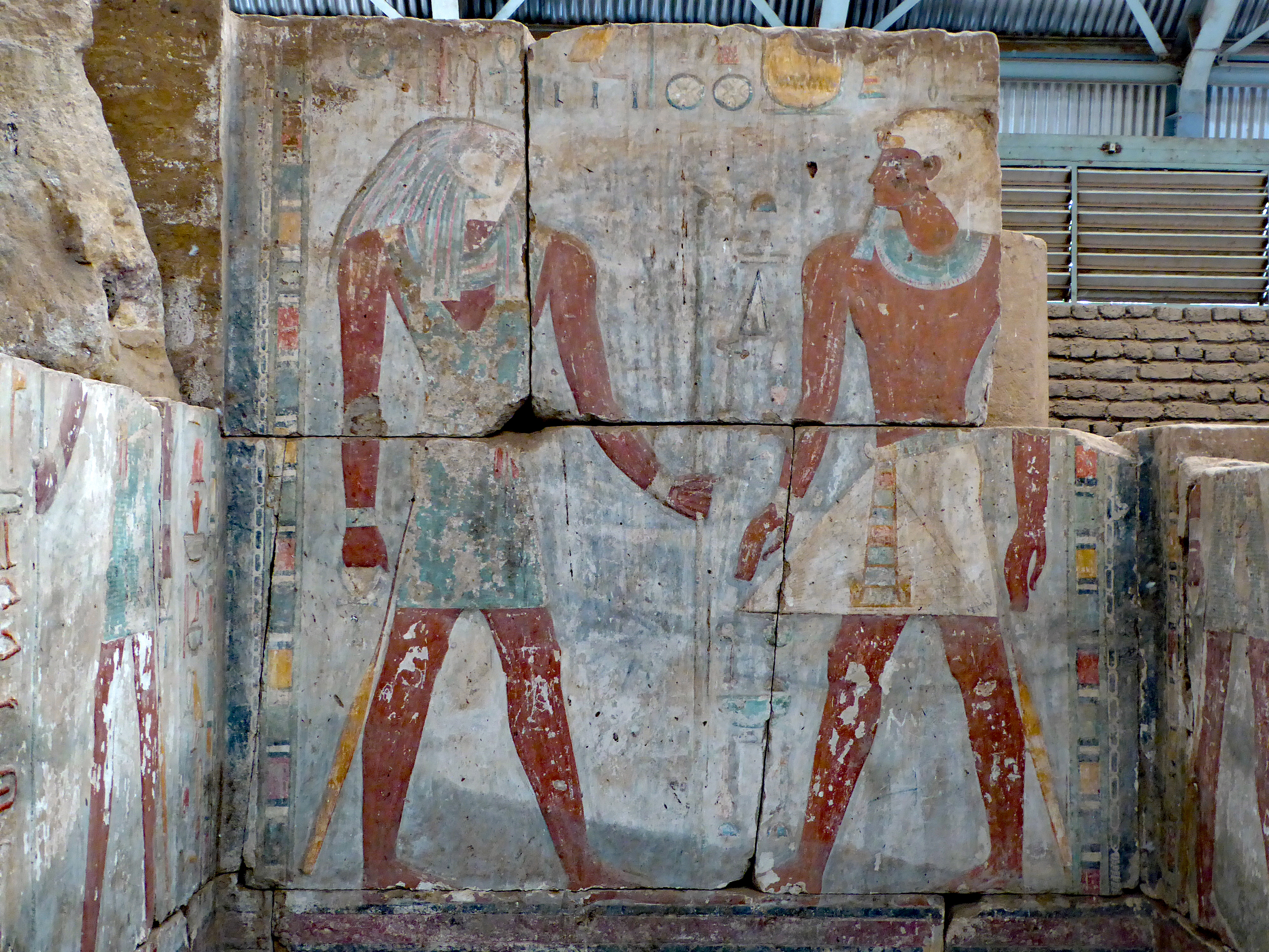
Relief of Thutmose II depicting him wearing a white khat

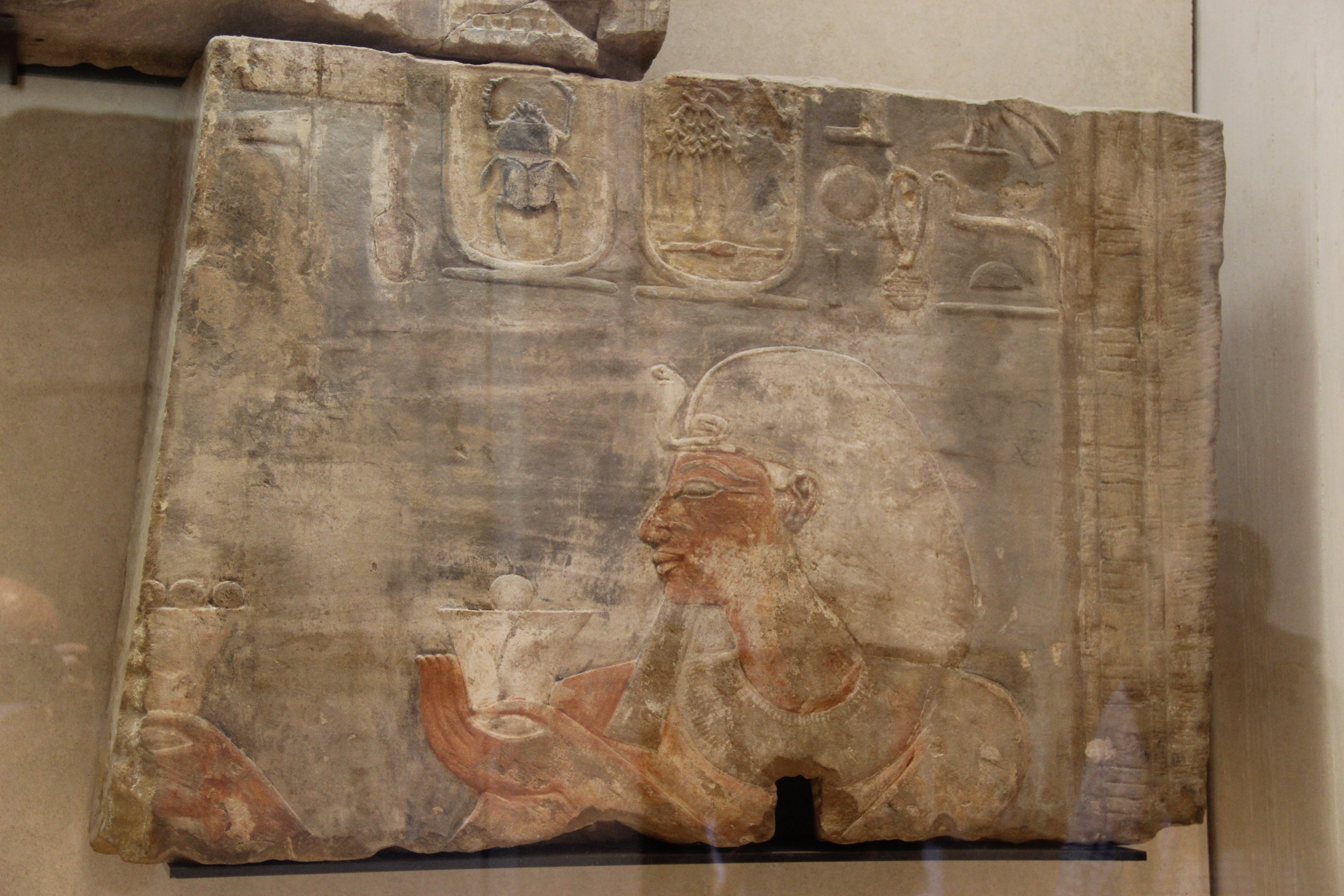
Relief of Thutmose III depicting him wearing a white khat

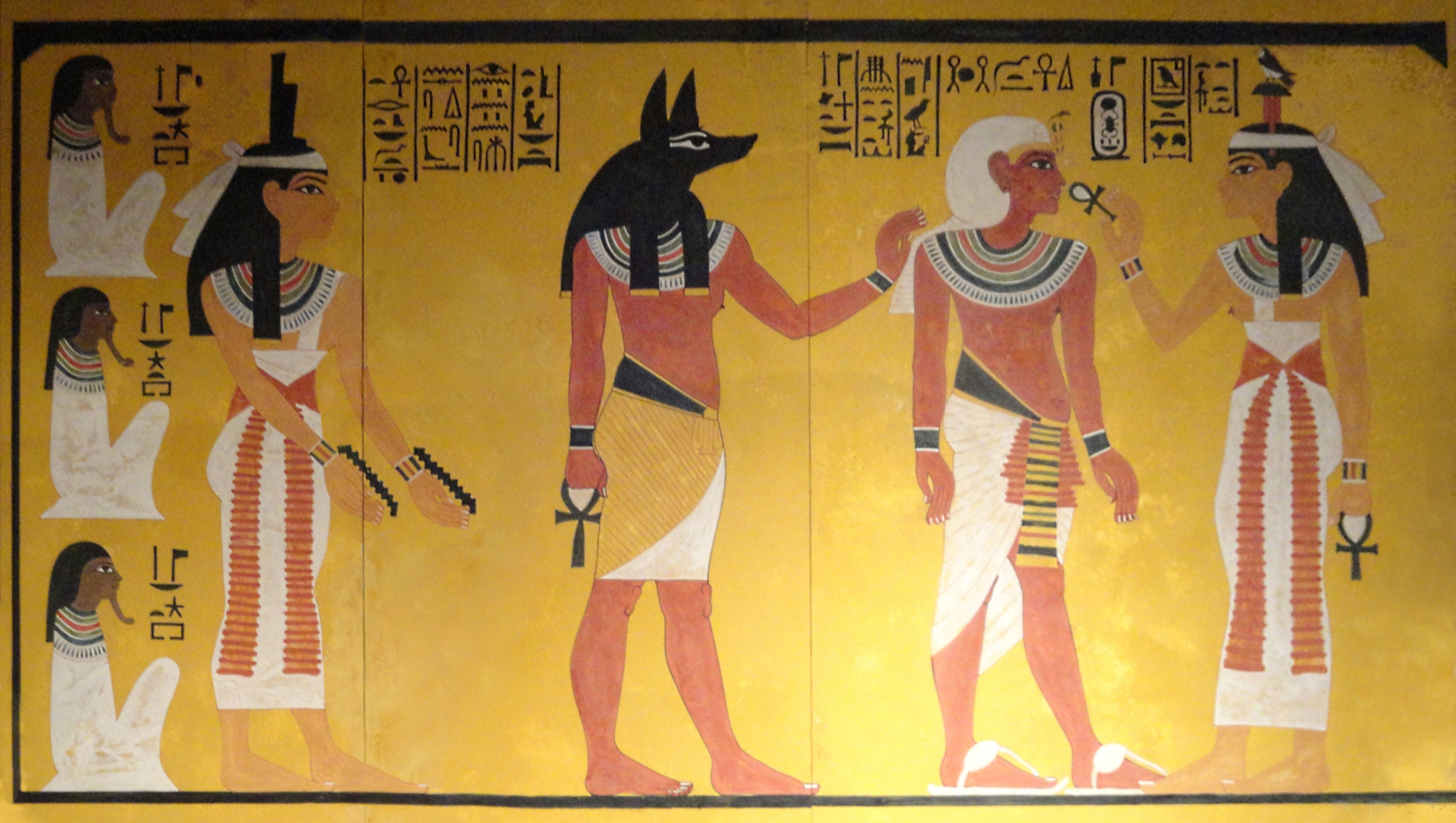
Reconstructed scene from the tomb of Tutankhamun (KV62) depicting Tutankhamun wearing a white khat

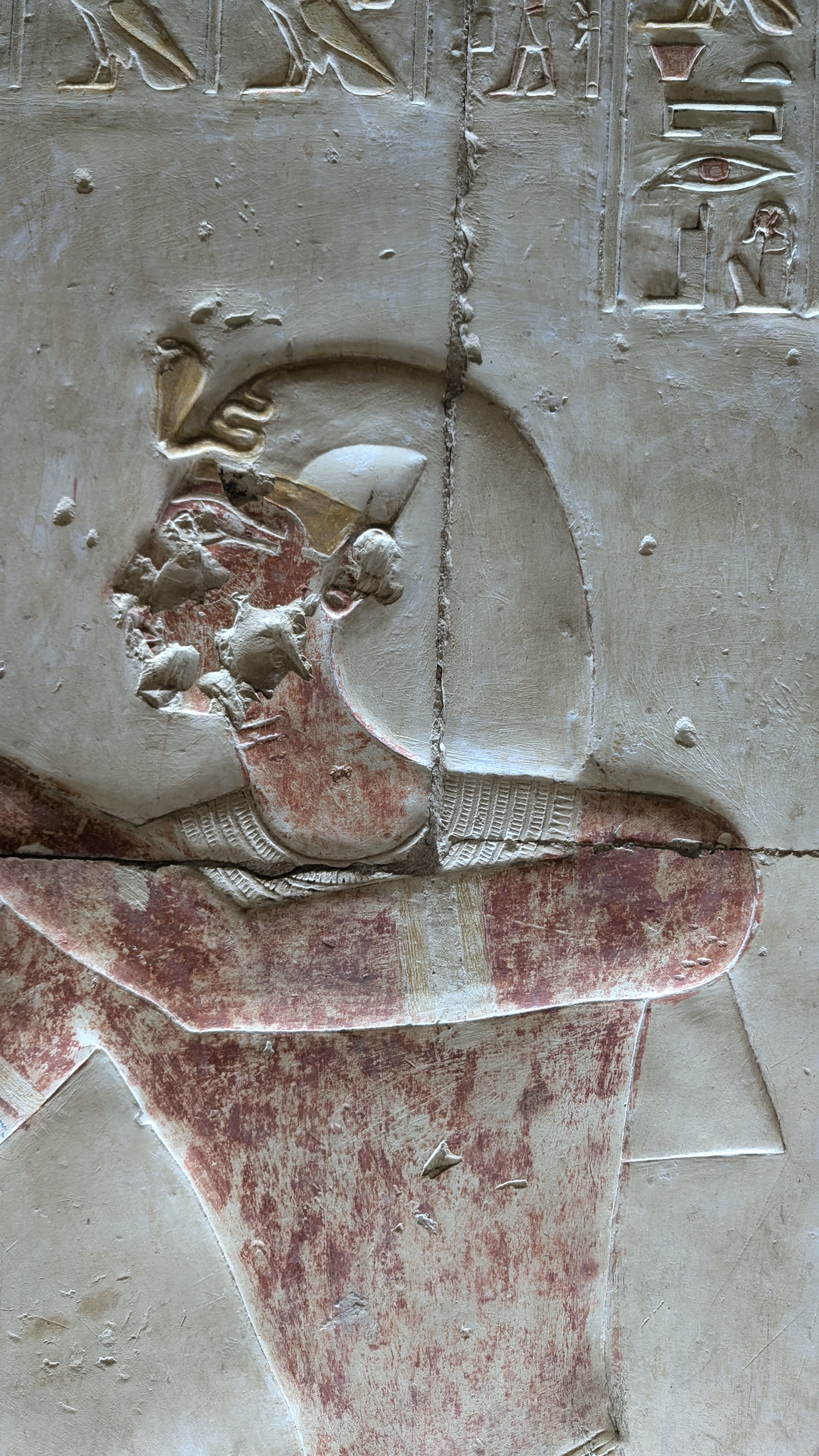
Relief of Seti I depicting him wearing a white khat

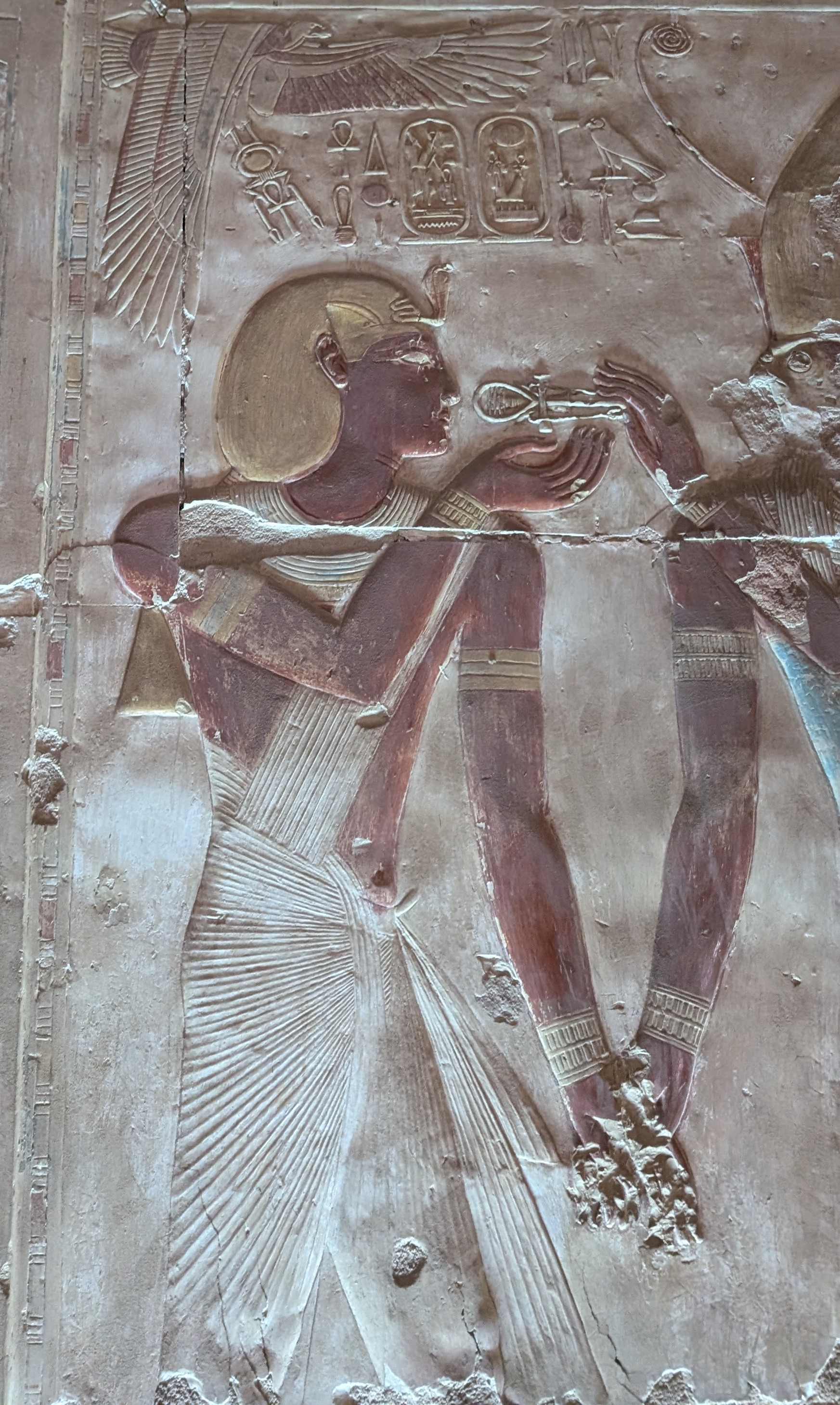
Relief of Seti I depicting him wearing a yellow khat

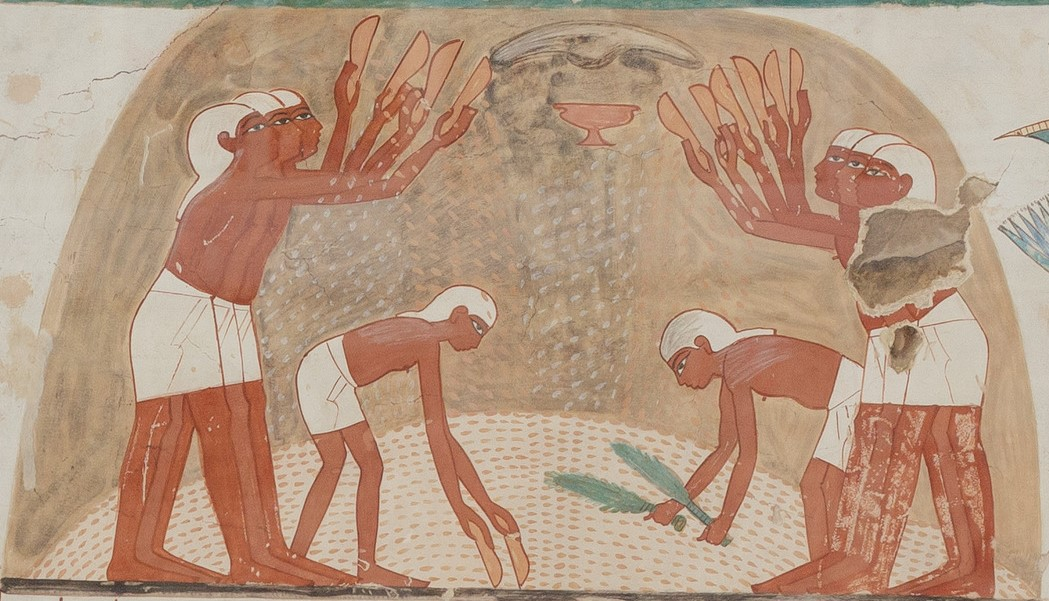
Winnowers wearing khats from the tomb of Nakht (TT52)

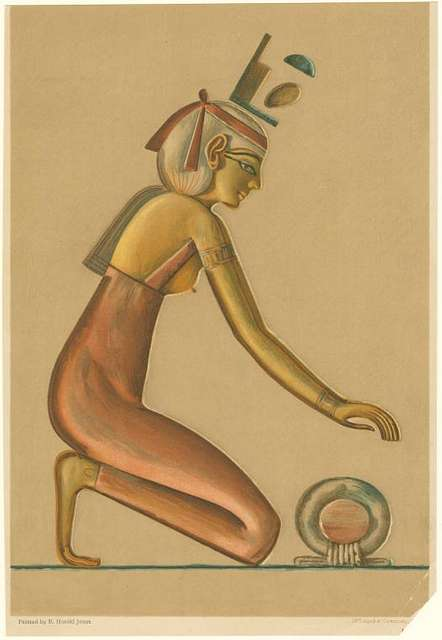
Painting of a relief of Isis, depicting her wearing a white khat with a red headband

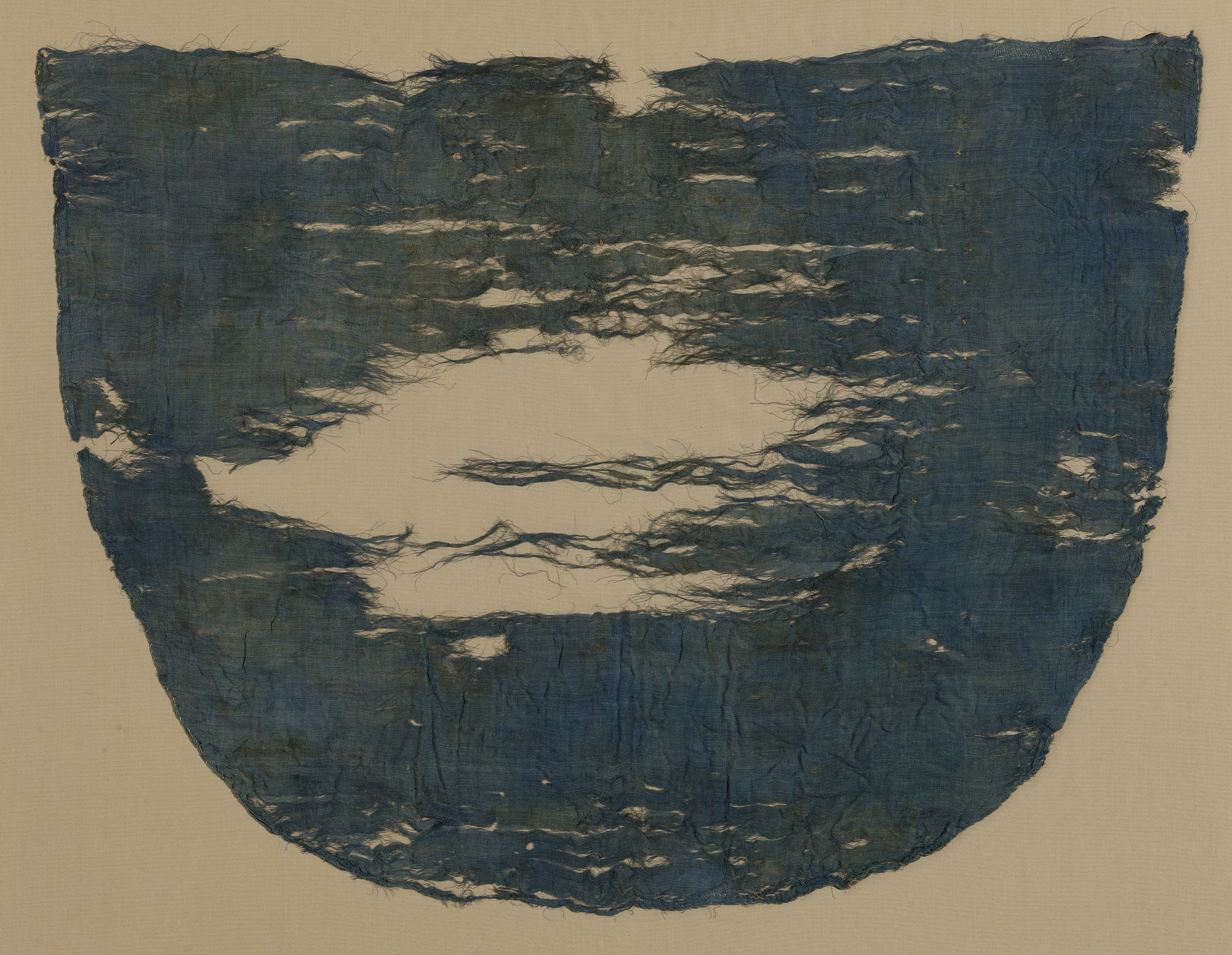
Blue khat from Tutankhamun's embalming cache

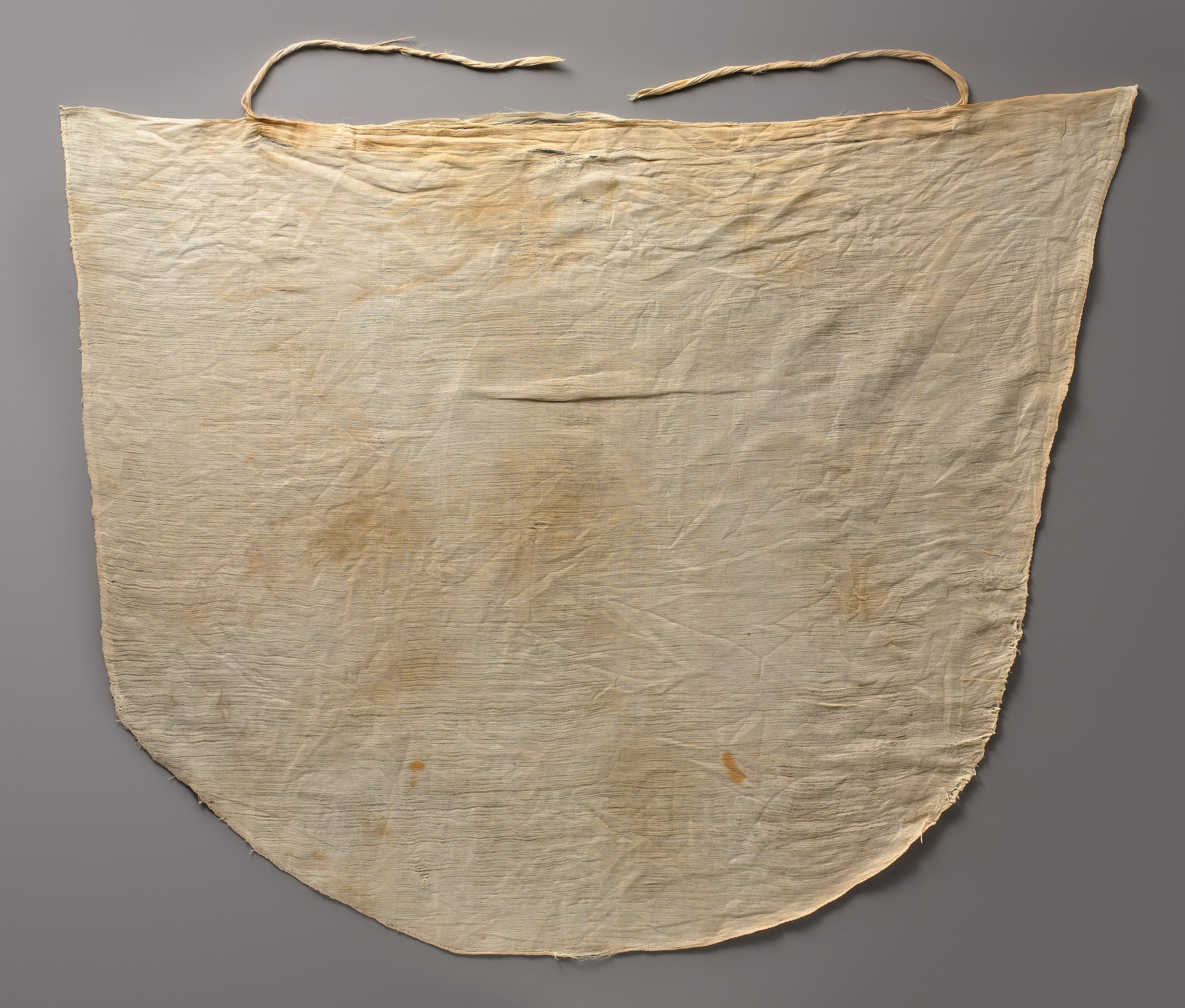
White khat from Tutankhamun's embalming cache

== Sources ==
- Toby A. H. Wilkinson, Early Dynastic Egypt, Routledge 1999
