= QV44 =

Ancient Egyptian tomb

Coordinates: 25.7270°N 32.5923°E

- Burial site of Khaemwaset (Ramesses III's son)
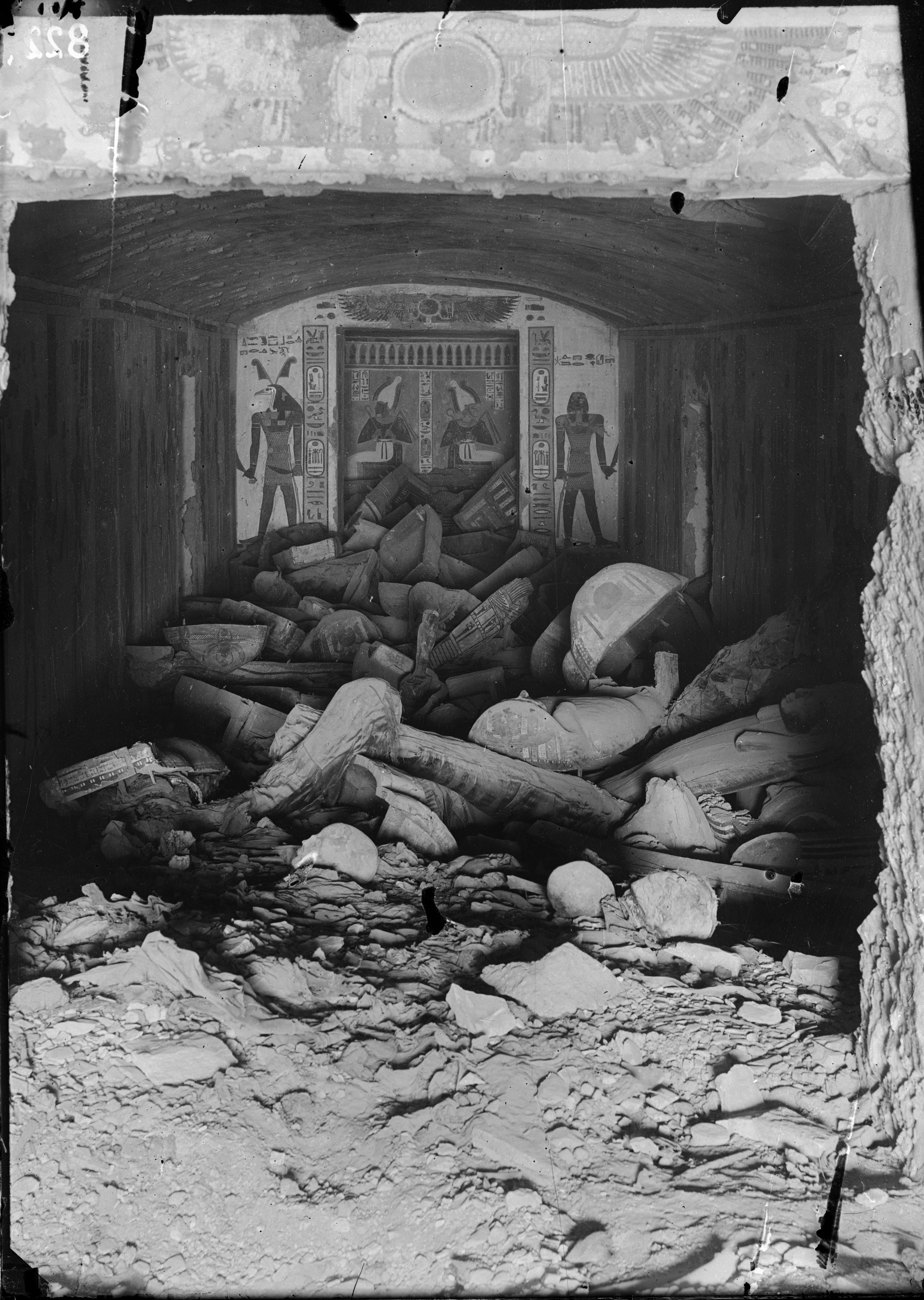
- QV44 during its discovery in 1903 by Francesco Ballerini in the campaign led by Ernesto Schiaparelli

- Location within Egypt
- Location: Valley of the Queens
- Discovered: 1903
- ← Previous; QV43 Next → QV45

QV44 is one of several tombs located in the Valley of the Queens intended for the use of Ramesses III's sons. The painted reliefs decorating Khaemwaset E's tomb illustrate his ritual and symbolic journey in the Afterlife as he meets the main gods of that region as well as the genies who guard the gates of the kingdom of Osiris.

QV44 is one of several tombs constructed for the sons of Ramesses III. Others are QV55 (Amun-her-khepeshef), QV53 (Ramesses), QV43 (Seth-her-khopsef, and QV42 (Pareherwenemef). Abitz argues that the princes are identified with the Four sons of Horus and are all real sons of the King. The decorations in these tombs focus more on the King than on his sons.

== Discovery ==
The tomb was discovered on February 15, 1903, during the first excavation campaign of the "Italian Archaeological Mission" led by Ernesto Schiaparelli between January and March. The find, together with that of the tomb (QV43) of Sethherkhepshef, another son of Ramesses III, was the most significant result of the first mission. The discovery was made by Francesco Ballerini, Schiaparelli's main collaborator.

In a letter dated February 17, 1903, Ballerini described the event, recounting how the workers found the initial section of a long, descending corridor, very wide and therefore most likely belonging to a tomb of considerable importance, and how Schiaparelli and Howard Carter, then Superintendent of Antiquities of Upper Egypt, were notified, and they arrived immediately upon hearing the news. The archaeologists, after clearing the doorjamb of a door, entered through an opening, crawling on the ground.

The tomb was found open and ransacked. After partially clearing the entrance, they entered a large room completely clogged with sarcophagi and mummies placed haphazardly. Schiaparelli and Ballerini thoroughly examined the tomb, which was entirely carved into the mountain. The corridor was 3 meters long, the central gallery had side rooms, and the entire space was cluttered with sarcophagi, many of them shattered, with mummies violated, probably by hyenas, others with cracked faces.

Inside, over forty wooden sarcophagi from a later period (25th-26th Dynasty) were found, as the tomb had been reused several times.

Images from Archivio Fotografico Museo Egizio, Turin

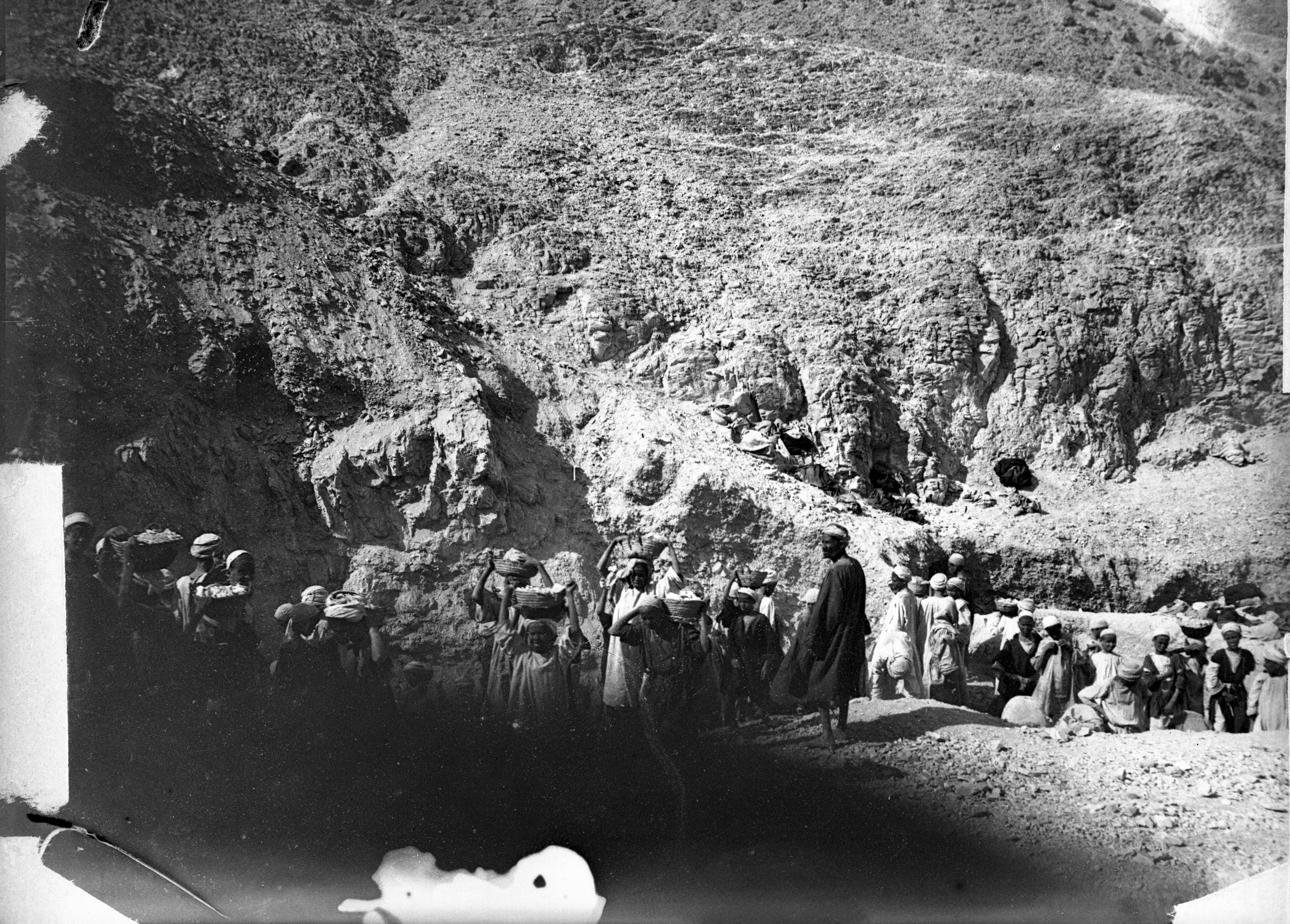
Excavation work at the bottom of the valley, at the site of the as-yet-undiscovered tomb QV44 of Khaemuaset. This work, shortly thereafter, on February 15, 1903, led to the discovery of the tomb.

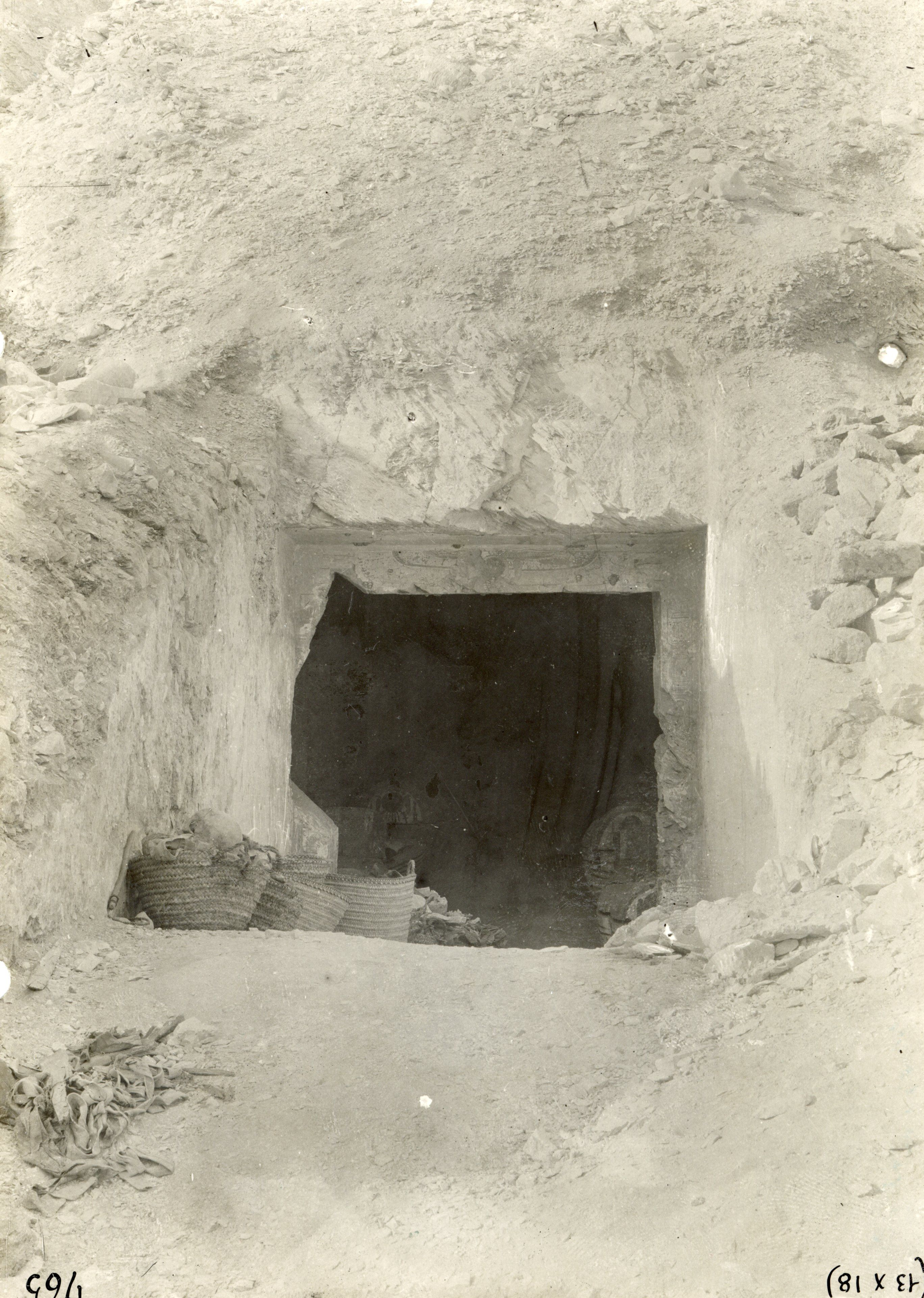
Entrance to the tomb at the time of its discovery, 1903. Inside, there are still numerous sarcophagi from a later period that were found when the tomb was opened, waiting to be taken to the camp (two of these can still be seen glimpsing in the darkness of the tomb's transverse hall).

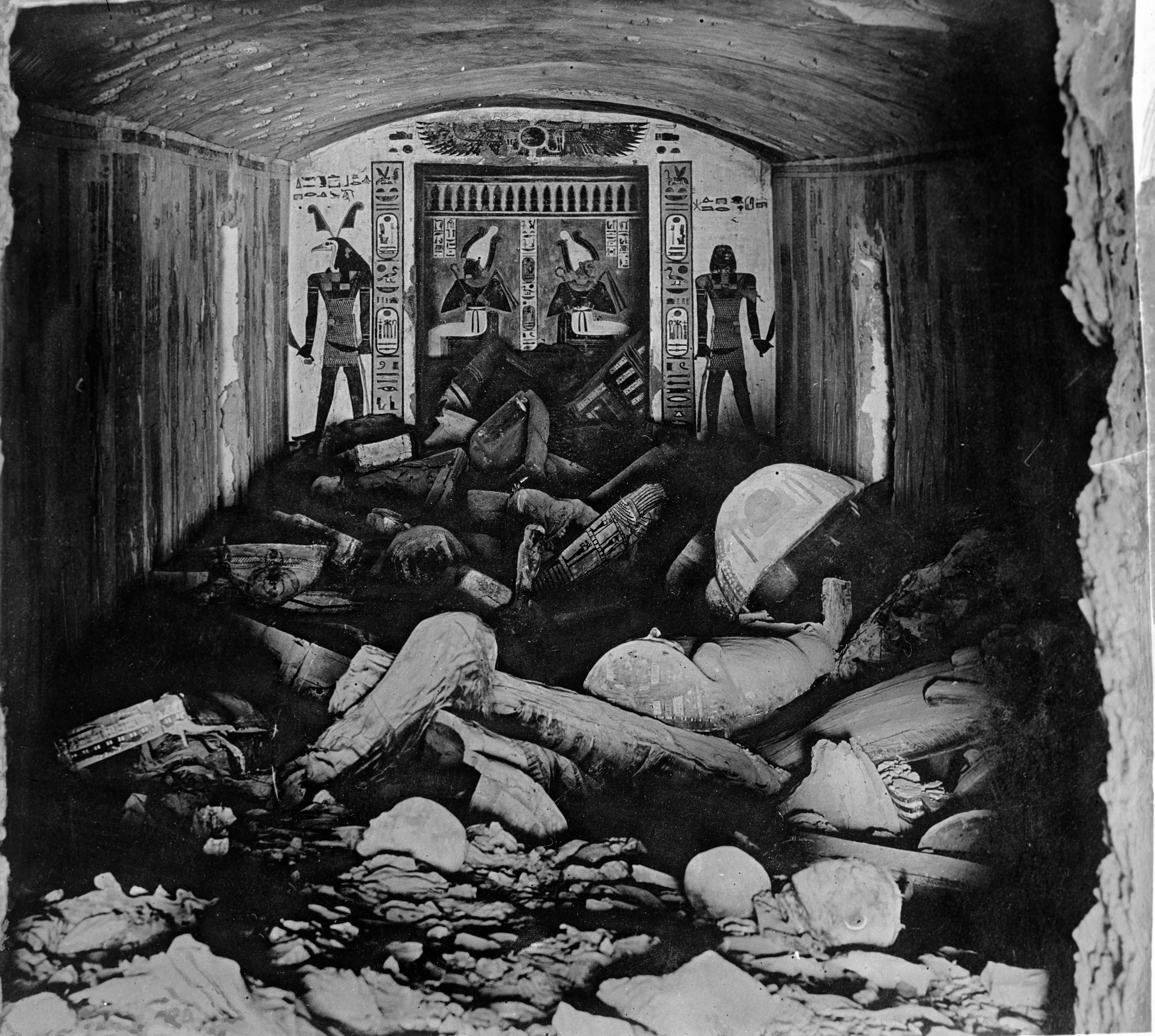
The vestibule of the tomb at the time of its discovery, February 15, 1903. Over forty wooden sarcophagi from a later period (25th-26th Dynasty) were found when the tomb was reused.

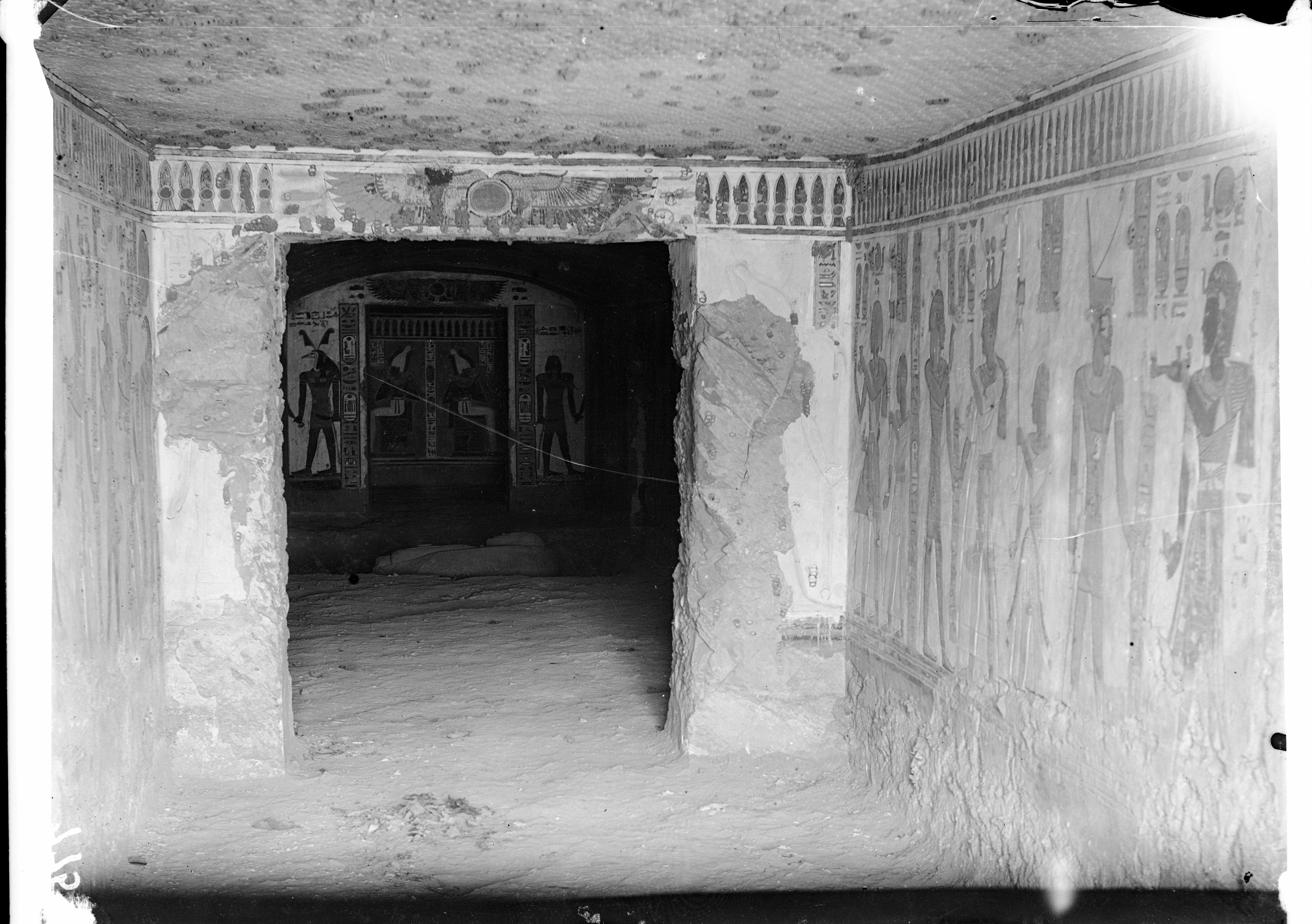
Vestibule and burial chamber of tomb QV 44, of Prince Khaemwaset, once emptied of sarcophagi from a later period. In the burial chamber, the granite sarcophagus of its original owner, Prince Khaemuaset (S. 5215), mutilated in its lower section, is located. Schiaparelli Excavations, 1903.

== Description ==
The tomb consist of a corridor, two side rooms, a second corridor and an inner room. The first part of the corridor is decorated with scenes showing King Ramesses III before a variety of gods and goddesses, including Ptah, Thoth, Anubis, Ra-Harakhty, Geb and more.

The side chambers include scenes of the Sons of Horus and the goddesses Isis, Nephthys, Neith and Serket.

The second corridor includes a scene showing Khaemwaset as an Iunmutef priest. Other scenes depict the Book of Gates.

The inner room is decorated with scenes showing the King before several gods and goddesses. Finds include part of a sarcophagus lid and remains of Canopic jars.

Lid of the outer sarcophagus of Khaemwaset. Museo Egizio, Turin.

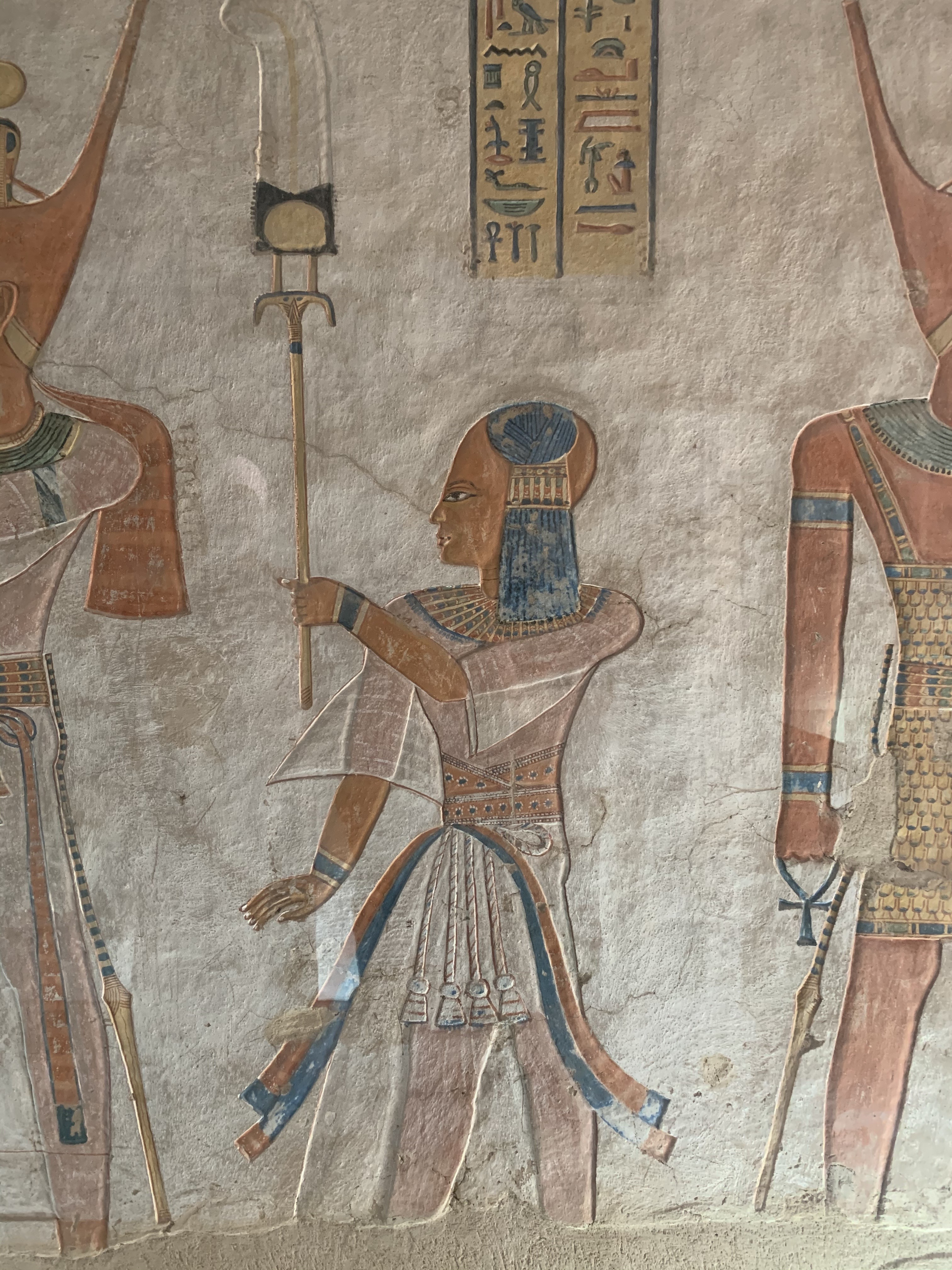
Prince Khaemwaset holding a feather in Tomb QV44

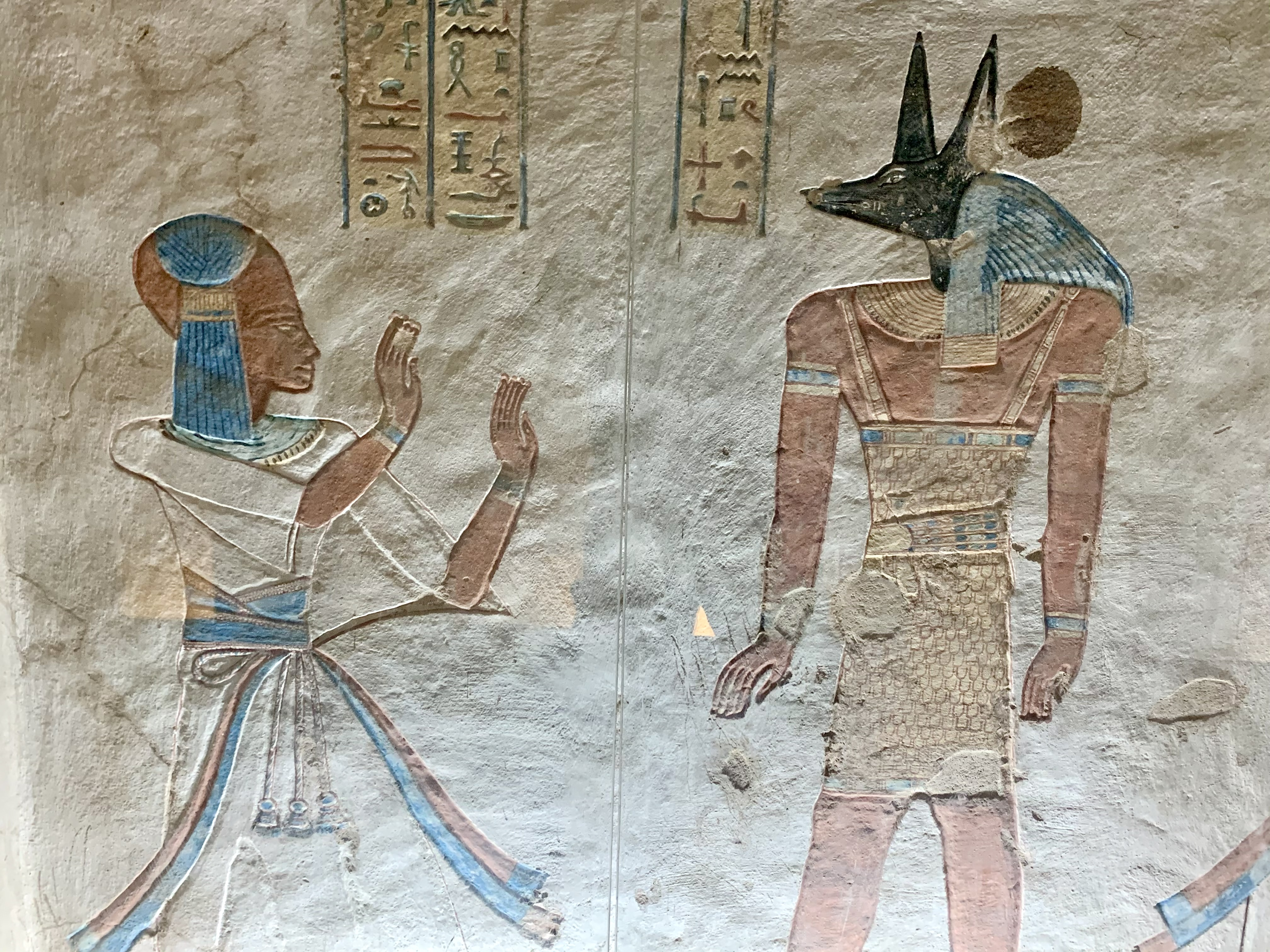
Prince Khaemwaset before Anubis in Tomb QV44

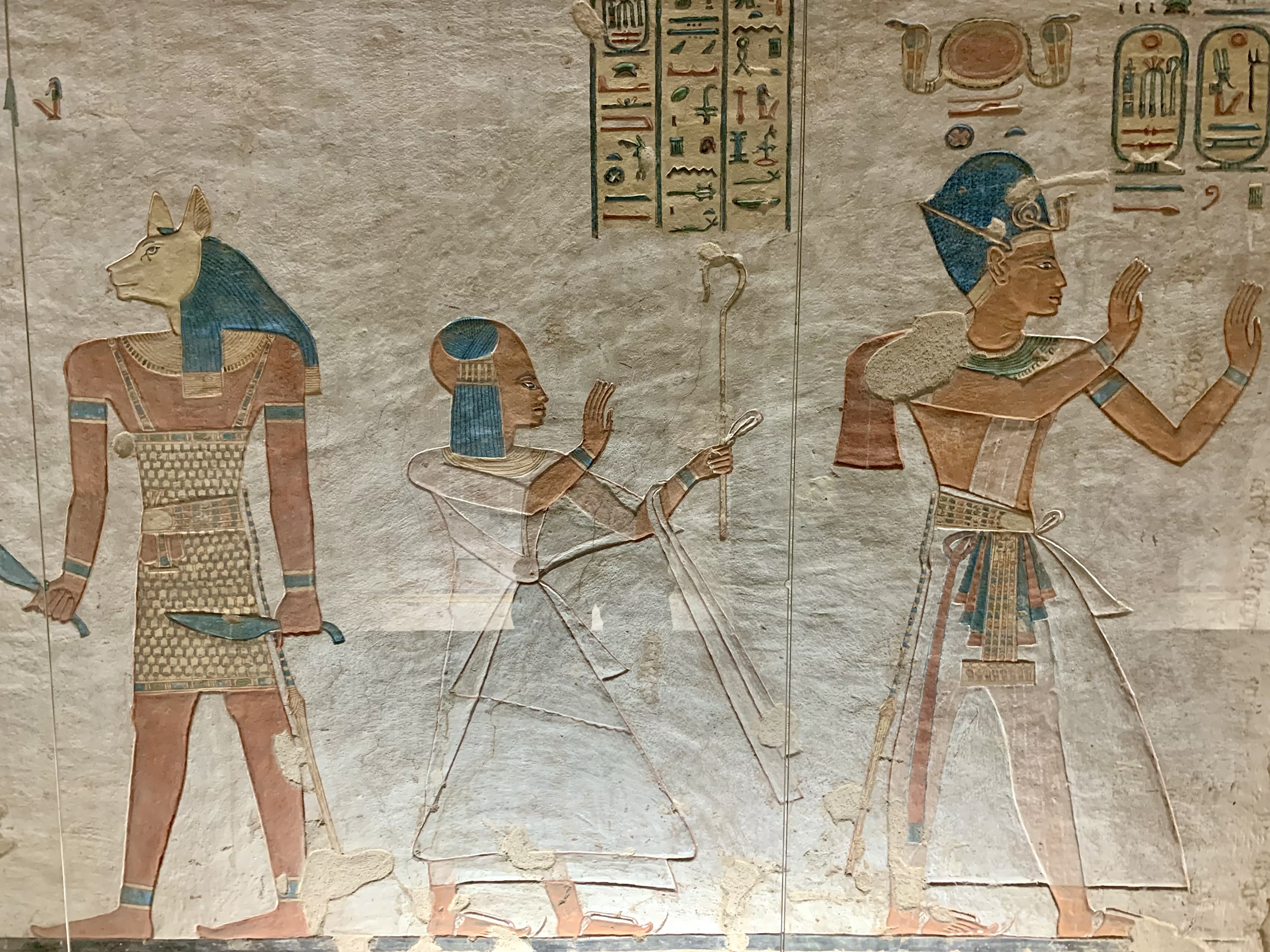
Prince Khaemwaset behind his father, king Ramesses III

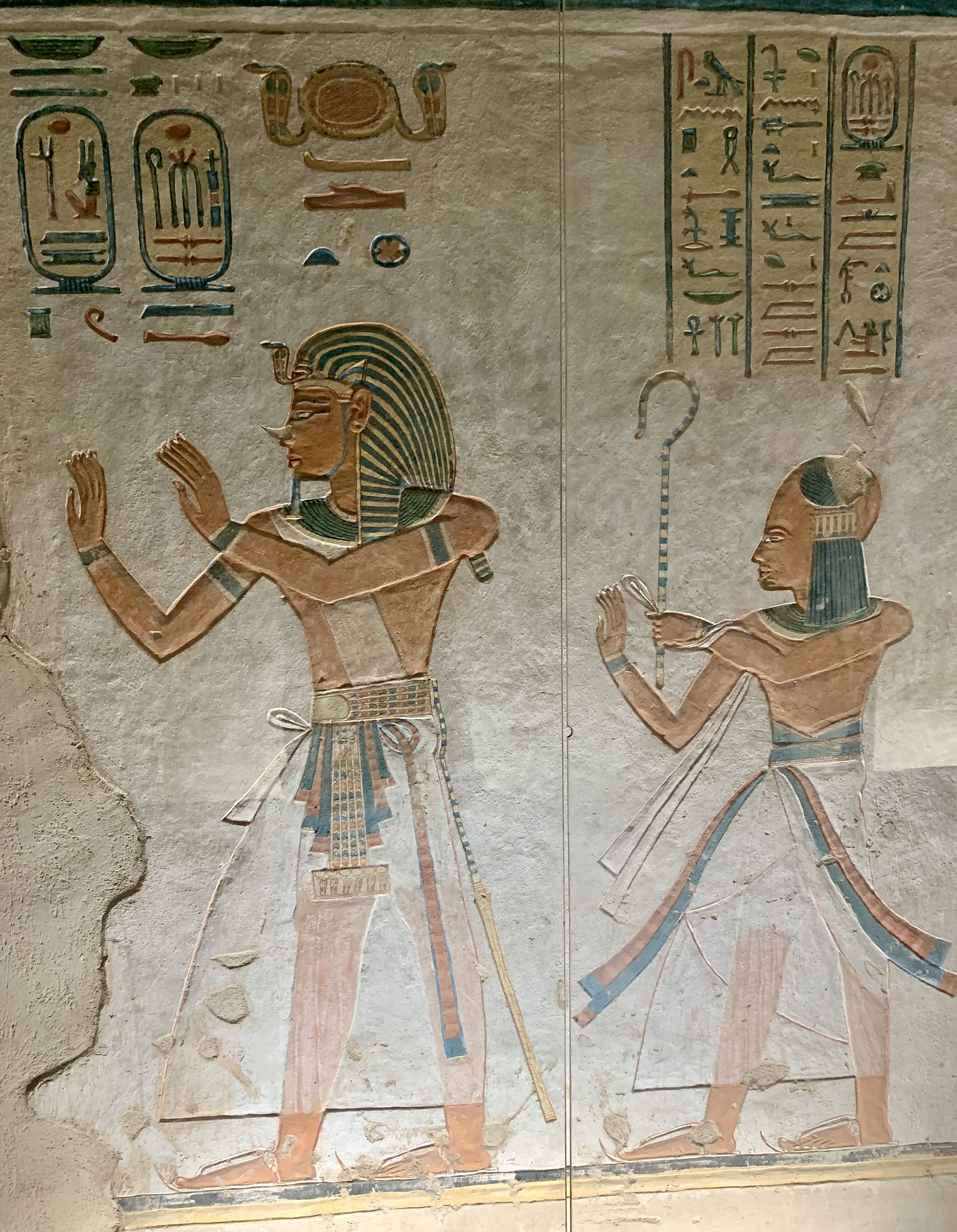
Prince Khaemwaset follows his father Ramesses III in Tomb QV44

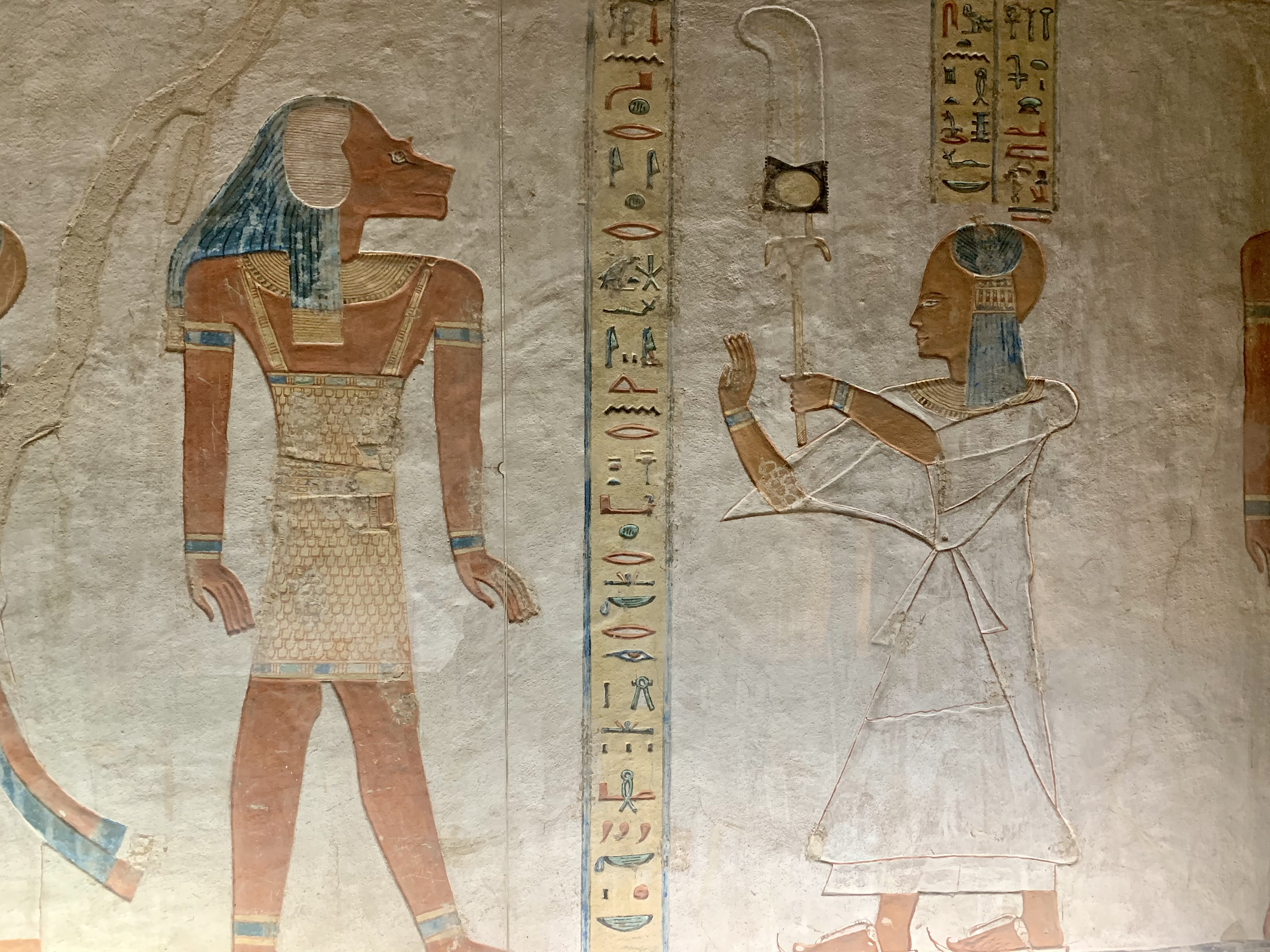
Prince Khaemwaset greets the god Hapy in Tomb QV44
