= Khaemwaset (20th dynasty) =

Son of Ramesses III

- Prince
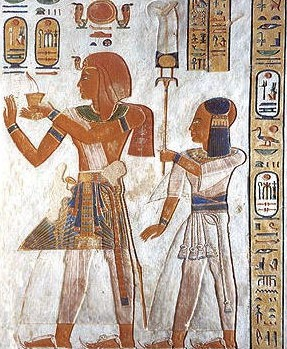
- Khaemwaset (right) with his father Ramesses III.
Egyptian name
xa a mDAt M wAs t niwt
- Dynasty: 20th Dynasty
- Pharaoh: Ramesses III, Ramesses IV
- Burial: QV44
- Father: Ramesses III

Khaemwaset or Khaemwase was an ancient Egyptian prince, a son of Pharaoh Ramesses III. His name can also be found as Ramesses Khaemwaset.

== Biography ==
The lid of the outer sarcophagus of Khaemwaset. Museo Egizio, Turin.

Like many of his brothers, he was named after a son of Ramesses II, Khaemwaset, and like the 19th dynasty Khaemwaset, he was a priest of Ptah in Memphis (though, unlike his namesake, not the high priest, only a sem-priest). He is depicted in his father's temple at Medinet Habu. Both Khaemwaset and his brother Pareherwenemef are mentioned as Eldest King's Son, which probably means that they were firstborn sons of different mothers.

His well preserved tomb, QV44 (in the Valley of the Queens) was excavated by Italian archaeologists in 1903-1904. A canopic jar of his is now in the Egyptian Museum in Cairo; his sarcophagus and probable mummy is in the Museo Egizio Turin. He outlived his father and was buried under the reign of his brother Ramesses IV, since the text on the sarcophagus mentions Ramesses IV.
