= Pareherwenemef (20th dynasty) =

Ancient Egyptian prince, son of Ramses III

pA ra Z1 Hr Z1 R14 a f A51
Pareherwenemef
in hieroglyphs
Era: New Kingdom
(1550–1069 BC)

Pareherwenemef ("Re is with his left arm") was an ancient Egyptian prince of the Twentieth Dynasty, a son of pharaoh Ramesses III. He is depicted in his father's mortuary temple at Medinet Habu and was buried in QV42 in the Valley of the Queens.

== Biography ==
Pareherwenemef was one of the sons of Ramesses III and, like several of his brothers, was named after a son of Ramesses II, whom Ramesses III sought to emulate. Both Pareherwenemef and his brother Khaemwaset are called firstborn sons of the king; they may therefore have been the firstborn sons of different wives of Ramesses III.

Pareherwenemef died at the age of 24, during the twentieth regnal year of his father. His mother may have been Minefer, since inscriptions on ushabtis found during excavations in QV42 in 1990-1991 suggest that Minefer was the owner of material found in the tomb and probably the mother of the prince. It has also been suggested that Pareherwenemef may have been married, because a princess's sarcophagus was found in his tomb.

However, Minefer’s ushabtis were actually found in the debris deposit in front of the entrance to QV45, near several tombs. Although funerary items of Pareherwenemef were also recovered there, it cannot automatically be concluded that everything in that deposit came from his tomb. Nor can Minefer be directly linked to the unnamed queen's portrait in QV42. Moreover, since Minefer held the title of King's Mother, unless she was the mother of Ramesses VIII, she cannot have been a wife of Ramesses III. At the same time, Ramesses VIII could also have been the grandson of Ramesses III. The painting technique of the queen's portrait in QV42 is clearly different from that of the rest of the same tomb. This tomb may originally have belonged to this queen and later been usurped by Ramesses III and granted to his son, or the tomb may later have been usurped by this queen; the tomb certainly underwent multiple usurpations in its later history.

As for the coffin clearly belonging to a woman, the vulture headdress indicates that she was clearly a queen. Because the ancient Egyptian royal family permitted endogamy, she may also have been a princess, but this cannot be proven. In any case, the wife of a prince would not have been depicted as a queen before her status changed. The names and titles on the coffin were all erased. It may have belonged to the original queen for whom QV42 was intended, and later been usurped, or to a queen who later usurped QV42 and was in turn usurped in a subsequent period.

In his report on the excavations of the Italian Archaeological Mission, Ernesto Schiaparelli referred to the prince under the form Pirahiremnif and observed that, in the scenes of the tomb, the figure is not given the Osirian epithet, although he is called "justified". Schiaparelli recorded for him titles connected with the great stable of the king, the royal palace and the status of eldest king's son, but noted that conclusions about the succession of the princes depend on whether the title of eldest son was used in an actual or honorific sense.

== Tomb ==
Pareherwenemef was buried in QV42, a tomb in the Valley of the Queens. The tomb has a narrow plan, with a long corridor leading to a burial chamber with four pillars, a western annex and a southern niche. It is oriented on a north-south axis.

The decoration of QV42 is similar to that of the other tombs made for sons of Ramesses III in the Valley of the Queens. In these tombs the principal figure is the king rather than the prince, and Pareherwenemef appears with Ramesses III in scenes of offerings to deities including Ptah, Meretseger, Osiris, Anubis, Thoth and Amun. In the burial chamber, the decoration includes Osiris, Anubis, a queen, a baboon, protective genii and scenes of Ramesses III and Pareherwenemef before divinities.

A female pink granite sarcophagus, identified as belonging to a queen, was found in the tomb. The Museo Egizio Photo Archive records the sarcophagus in a photograph of the interior taken at the time of discovery, where it is visible in the centre of the burial chamber and is identified with the numbers S.05435/1 and S.05435/2. The same archive preserves a photograph of the entrance taken during the excavations of Schiaparelli in 1904-1906, with a plaque commemorating the Italian excavations of 1904.

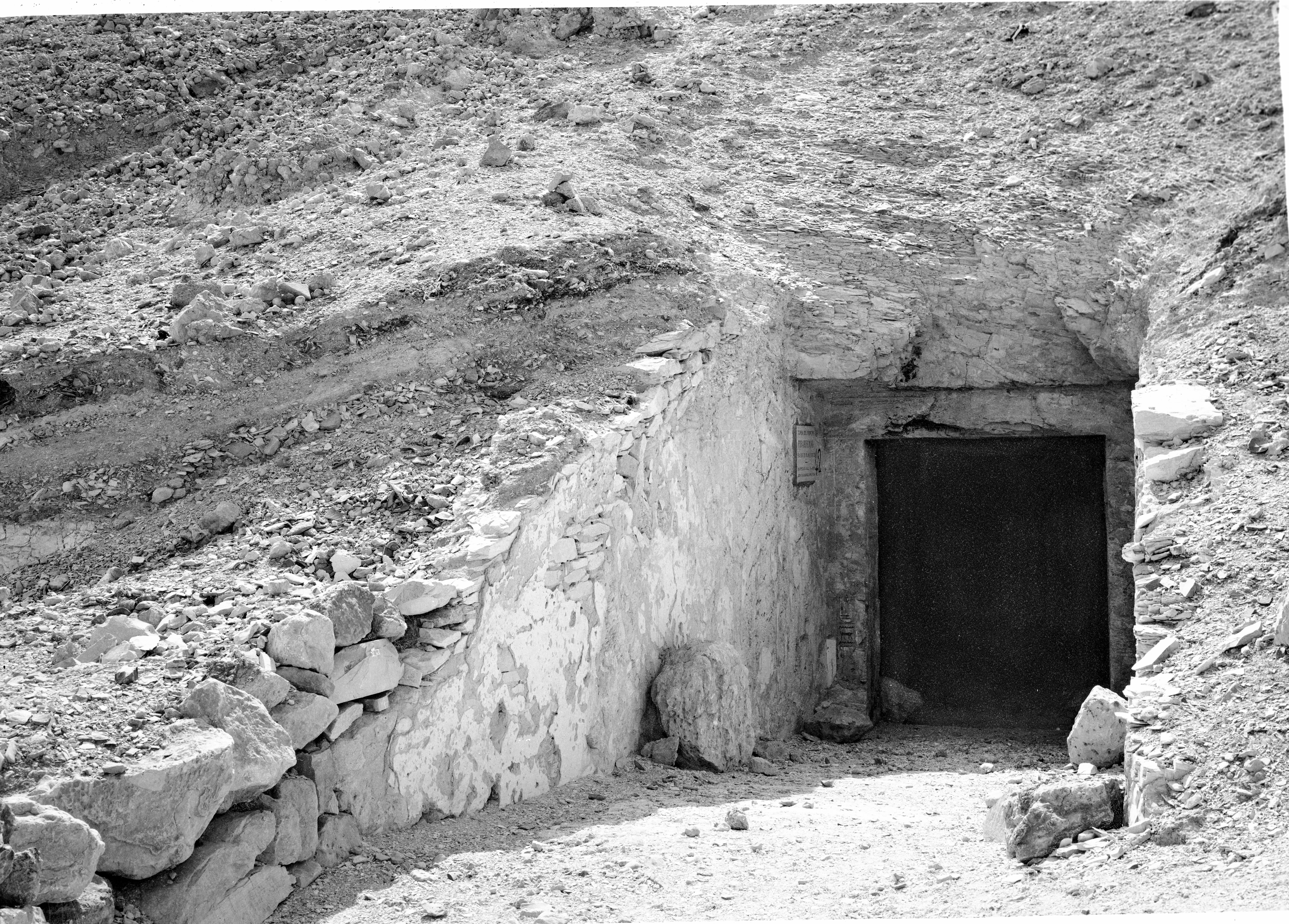
Entrance to QV42 during the Schiaparelli excavations, 1904-1906. Museo Egizio Photo Archive, Turin (C01863).

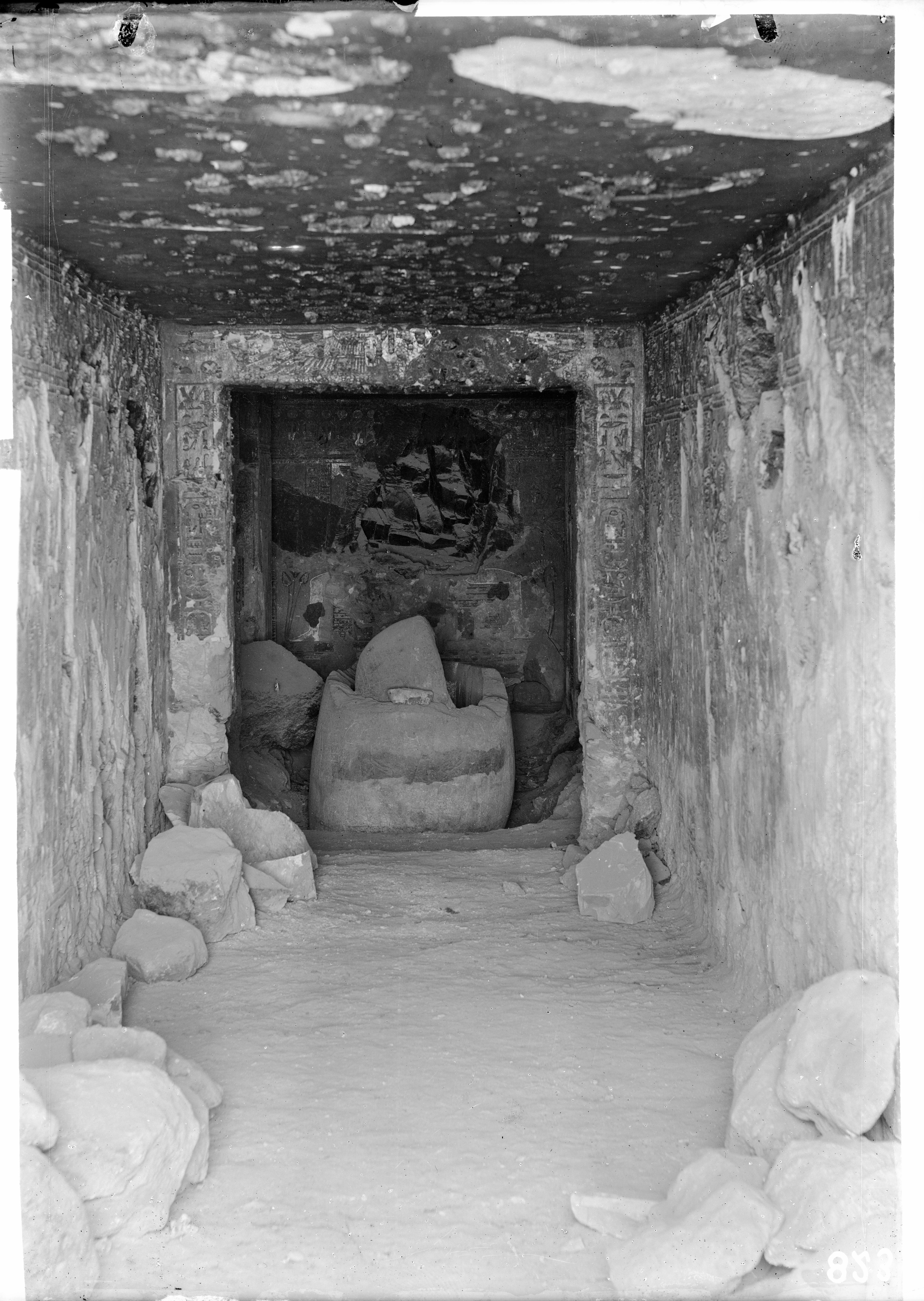
Interior of QV42 at the time of discovery; a female pink granite sarcophagus is visible in the burial chamber. Museo Egizio Photo Archive, Turin (C00823).

== Bibliography ==
- Demas, Martha; Agnew, Neville (2012). Valley of the Queens Assessment Report, Volume 1: Conservation and Management Planning (PDF). Los Angeles: Getty Conservation Institute.
- Dodson, Aidan; Hilton, Dyan (2004). The Complete Royal Families of Ancient Egypt. London: Thames & Hudson. ISBN 978-0-500-05128-3.
- Schiaparelli, Ernesto (1924). Esplorazione della "Valle delle Regine" nella necropoli di Tebe. Relazione sui lavori della Missione archeologica italiana in Egitto (anni 1903-1920) (in Italian). Vol. 1. Turin: Casa editrice Giovanni Chiantore.
