= QV42 =

Ancient Egyptian tomb in the Valley of the Queens

Theban tomb QV42
- Burial site of Pareherwenemef
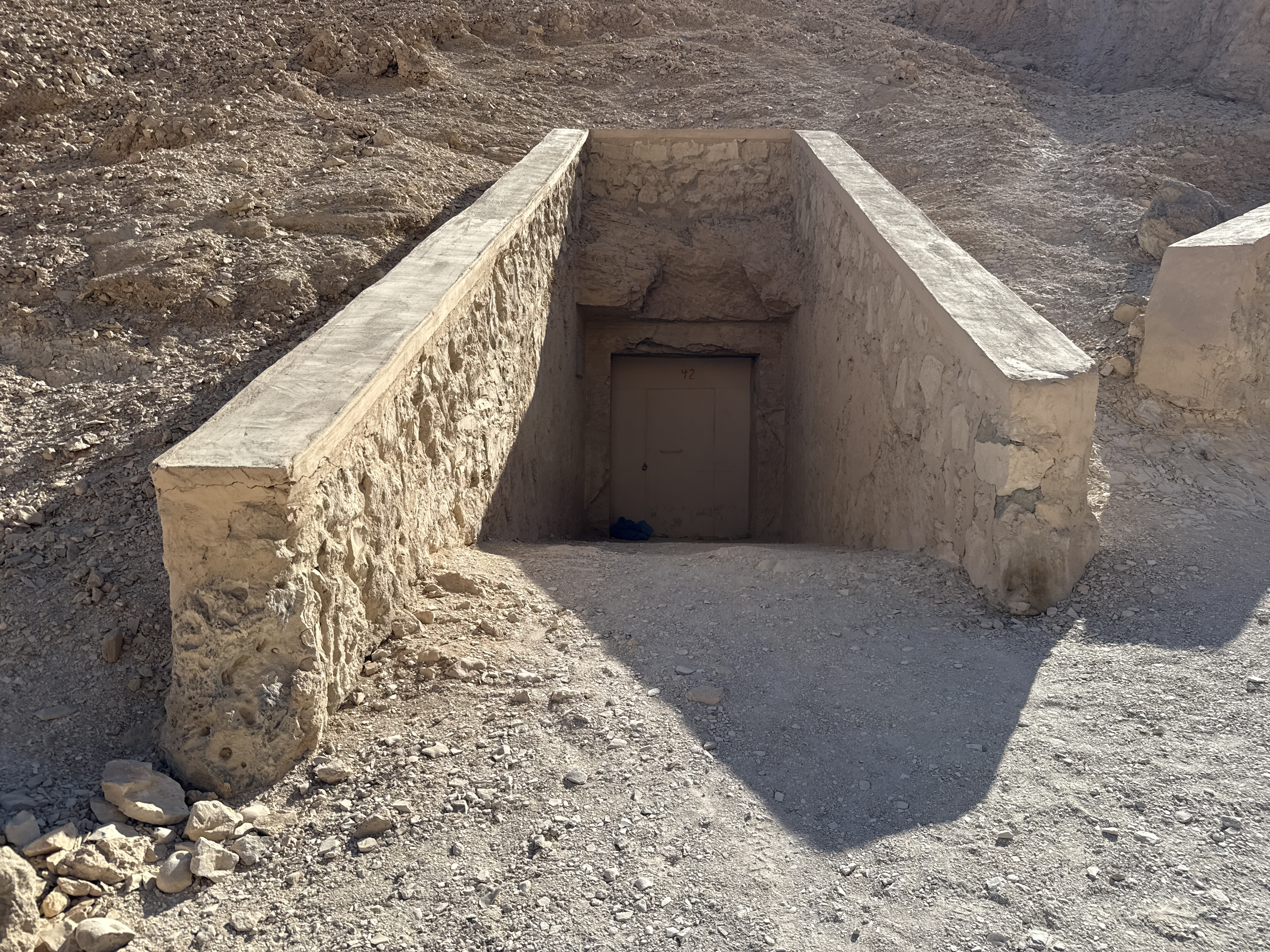
- Entrance to tomb QV42 in 2025.
- Location: Valley of the Queens, Theban Necropolis, Theban Necropolis
- Discovered: Known by c. 1826
- Excavated by: Ernesto Schiaparelli, 1904
- Decoration: Painted and incised reliefs
- Layout: Long corridor and four-pillared burial chamber

QV42 (Queen Valley 42), which is the desnigation for the tomb of Pareherwenemef, is one of the tombs located in the Valley of the Queens, within the Theban Necropolis, on the west bank of the Nile opposite Luxor, in Egypt. It was made for Pareherwenemef, the fifth son of Ramesses III.

== Occupant ==
The owner of the tomb was Pareherwenemef, a son of Ramesses III. The prince's Egyptian name, Pȝ Rˁ ḥr wnm.f, means "Re is with his left arm". Pareherwenemef died relatively young, at the age of 24, during the twentieth regnal year of his father. It has been suggested that he may have been married, because a princess's sarcophagus was found in his tomb. The prince is also represented in the mortuary temple of Ramesses III at Medinet Habu.

In his report on the excavations of the Italian Archaeological Mission, Schiaparelli referred to the prince under the form Pirahiremnif and observed that, in the scenes of the tomb, the figure is not given the Osirian epithet, although he is called "justified". Schiaparelli recorded for him titles connected with the great stable of the king, the royal palace and the status of eldest king's son, but noted that conclusions about the succession of the princes depend on whether the title of eldest son was used in an actual or honorific sense.

== Excavations ==
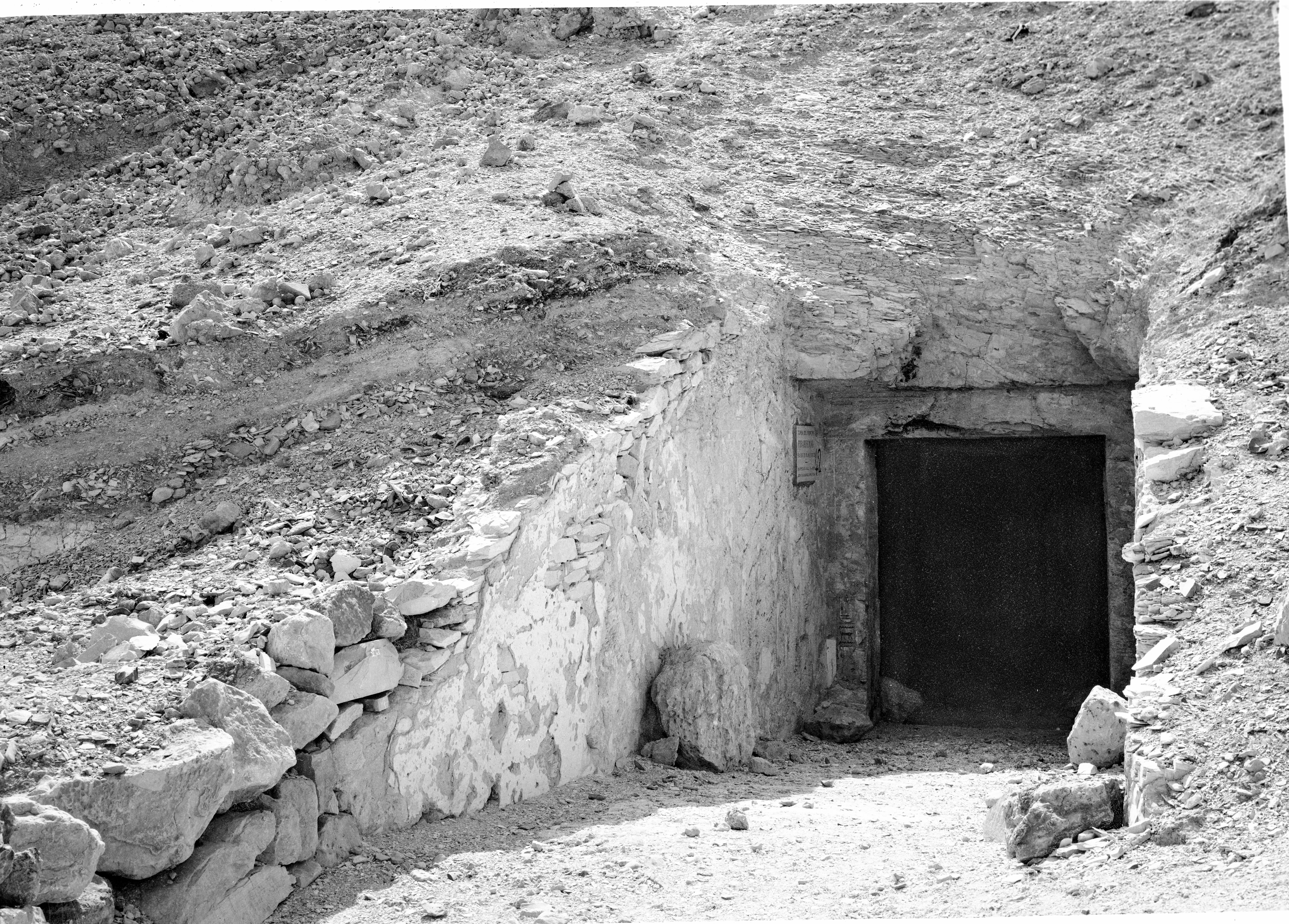
Entrance to the tomb during the excavations of Ernesto Schiaparelli, 1904-1906. Museo Egizio Photo Archive, Turin (C01863).

The tomb was accessible by about 1826, since it was already mentioned by Robert Hay. It was also mentioned by John Gardner Wilkinson in 1828, by Jean-François Champollion in 1828-1829, by Karl Richard Lepsius in 1844-1845 and by Heinrich Karl Brugsch in 1854. The Italian mission led by Ernesto Schiaparelli in 1904 and the American mission of 1959-1960 led by Elizabeth Thomas documented the tomb. Other missions worked in the tomb for the CNRS and the Egyptian Supreme Council of Antiquities in 1988-1991, 1994 and 2008, and for the Getty Conservation Institute and the Supreme Council of Antiquities in 2006-2008 and 2010.

The tomb was published by Schiaparelli in the report of the Italian Archaeological Mission under the title "La Tomba di Pirahiremnif", in the section devoted to the tombs of the princes who were sons of Ramesses III. According to Schiaparelli, the tomb had been violated repeatedly and, for a time, may have been used as a dwelling; for this reason the decoration was largely destroyed or blackened by smoke, although enough elements survived to reconstruct the subject matter of the scenes and to show the original quality of the monument's decoration. The Museo Egizio Photo Archive preserves two photographs of QV42 connected with the Schiaparelli excavations: a view of the entrance, dated 1904-1906, with the plaque commemorating the discovery during the Italian excavations of 1904, and a view of the interior, dated 1904, in which a female pink granite sarcophagus is visible in the centre of the burial chamber.

The excavations documented in the tomb a female pink granite sarcophagus, identified as belonging to a princess and visible in photograph C00823 of the Museo Egizio Photo Archive, where it is recorded with the numbers S.05435/1 and S.05435/2. Inscriptions on ushabtis found during a new excavation of QV42 by Christian Leblanc in 1990-1991 suggest that the owner was Minefer, probably the mother of Prince Pareherwenemef.

== Description ==
The tomb is very narrow and consists of a long corridor leading to the burial chamber. The burial chamber has four pillars, an annex on its western side and a niche on its southern side. The tomb is oriented on a north-south axis. Schiaparelli described the tomb as consisting, in addition to the open-air corridor common to the other tombs, of a corridor or elongated hall, a large hall supported by four pillars and another chamber to the right of the larger one. In the same description, Schiaparelli noted that the side chamber preserved no traces of decoration, while the first two rooms were covered with scenes and inscriptions, partly incised and partly modelled in very low relief in stucco laid over the rock.

The decoration of this tomb is similar to that found in the tombs of the other sons of Ramesses III. In all these tombs, the principal figure appears to be the king rather than the princes.

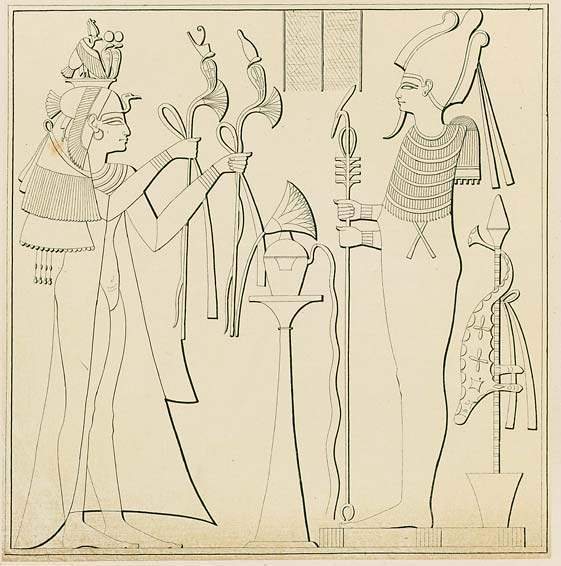
Unidentified female figure from the tomb of Pareherwenemef, from Lepsius's Denkmäler.

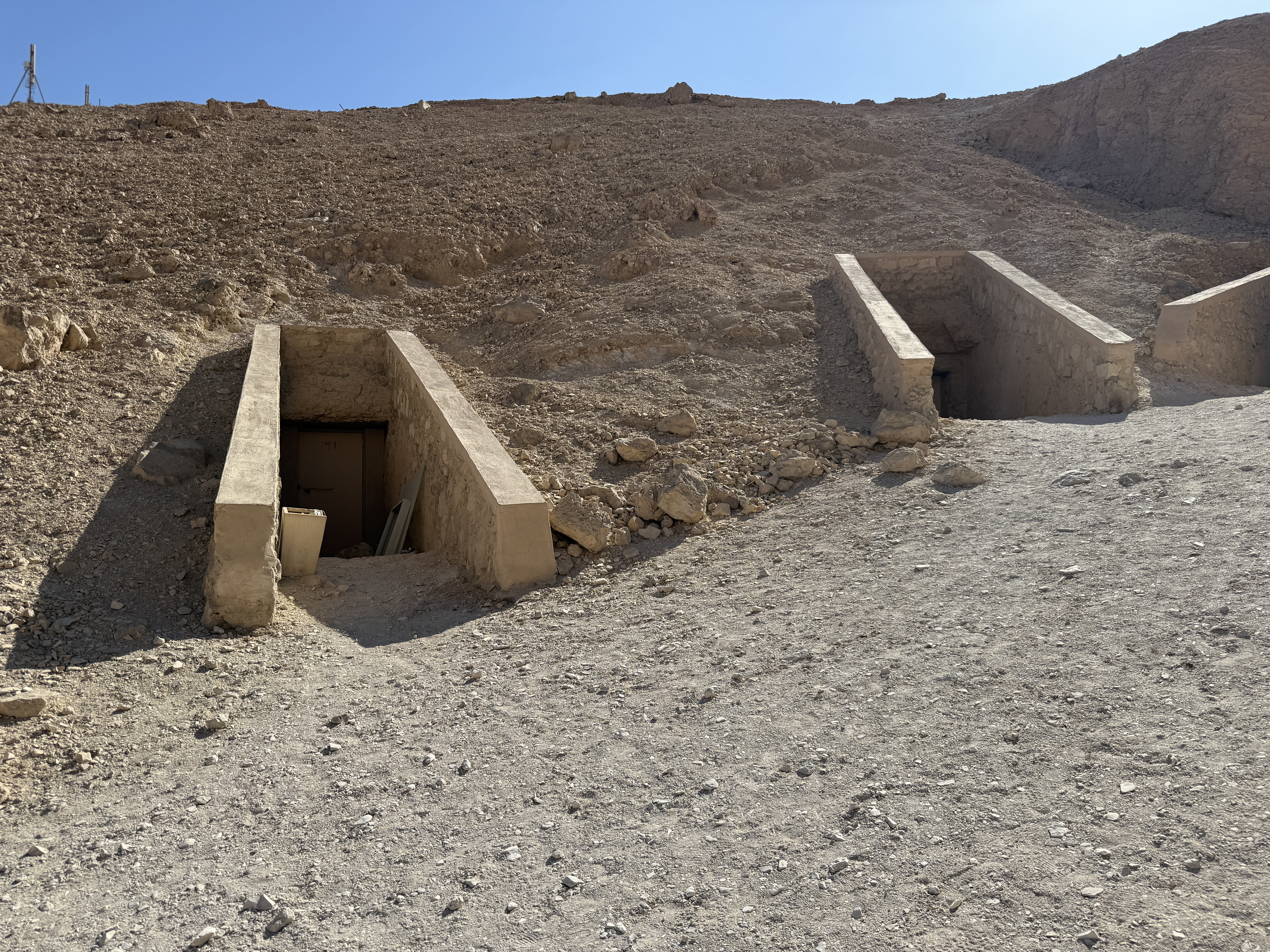
View of the area of tomb QV42 in the Valley of the Queens.

=== Conservation ===
The main historical evidence for the state of preservation of QV42 is Schiaparelli's account, which describes the tomb as repeatedly violated and possibly used for a time as a dwelling. Schiaparelli connected this history with the poor condition of part of the decoration: the scenes were largely destroyed or blackened by smoke, but still preserved enough elements to identify the pictorial programme and the original quality of the work. The alterations mainly affect the legibility of the decorated surfaces rather than the identification of the tomb's structure. Schiaparelli's description makes it possible to distinguish the decorated spaces, namely the corridor or elongated hall and the large hall, from the side chamber, which preserved no traces of decoration.

QV42 was later included in the assessments carried out by the Getty Conservation Institute and the Egyptian Supreme Council of Antiquities in the Valley of the Queens. The second volume of the Getty report presents, for the tombs of the Nineteenth and Twentieth Dynasties, records including identification data, use and interventions, previous documentation, condition of the wall paintings, structural stability and conservation recommendations.

=== Interior ===
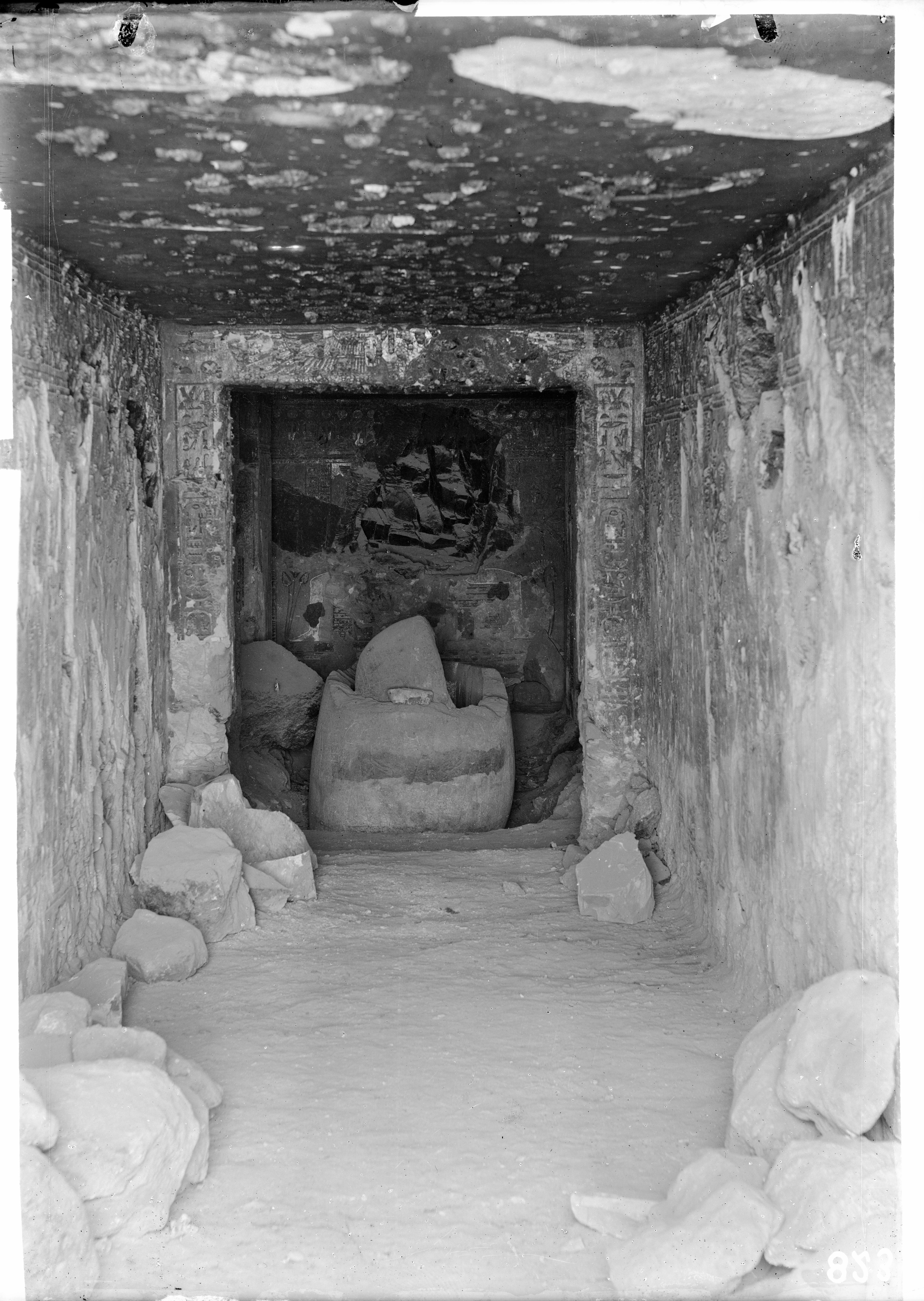
Interior of tomb QV42 at the time of discovery; a female pink granite sarcophagus is visible in the centre of the burial chamber. Museo Egizio Photo Archive, Turin (C00823).

=== Corridor ===
The main wall decoration on the left side of the corridor includes scenes in which Pareherwenemef and his father Ramesses III make offerings to the gods, including bread to Ptah, wine to Meretseger and incense to Osiris. Schiaparelli described, in the first scene on the left, the presentation of conical bread to Ptah, followed by the offering of vessels to the goddess Meretseger, the offering of incense to Amun, another offering of incense to Anubis, an offering to Tum and another, no longer distinguishable, offering to Thoth.

At the end of the corridor, at the entrance to the burial chamber, there is a representation of Ramesses III. On the right wall of the corridor, Pareherwenemef and Ramesses III are accompanied by the gods Geb, Thoth and Amun. On the lintel of the entrance to the burial chamber there is a solar disk, while a hymn is inscribed on the inner walls of the same entrance.

=== Burial chamber ===
In the burial chamber, on the left side of the wall entered from the corridor, Osiris, a queen, a baboon and Anubis are represented. The queen wears a usekh collar, a tripartite wig with a vulture-shaped headdress and the uraeus, and holds a sceptre. Two figures are represented on the right of the same wall. The first has a leonine head and advances with his left arm stretched toward the shoulder of the second, with the hand open and the fingers joined, while his right arm hangs along the body and holds a knife. He wears a striped kilt, a strapped bodice, the usekh collar, a belt with a false tail, bracelets and anklets. He is connected with Horsemsou, that is, Horus the Elder. The second figure is shown as a seated naked boy and wears the afnet, a headdress similar to the nemes, with the uraeus, the usekh collar, bracelets and anklets. He bends one arm to place the hand on the opposite shoulder, while the other hand rests on his knee. He is shown seated on a curved white stool on a green mat. His iconography recalls that of Harpocrates, that is, the child Horus.

On the eastern wall of the same chamber, Pareherwenemef is shown with the king before Anubis, then before a shrine, and finally offering, together with the king, the image of Maat to a group of genii composed of a vulture, a kneeling hippopotamus-headed figure holding knives and a kneeling anthropomorphic deity with knives. The last two wear anklets. On the southern wall, Ramesses III and Pareherwenemef are represented with Nekhbet, holding a sceptre, and Serket before Osiris. On the western wall, Pareherwenemef is represented with Ramesses III before Osiris and then before Horsemsou, that is, Horus the Elder. Another scene on the same wall includes a standing leonine-headed demon and a seated jackal-headed demon carrying knives.

On the north-eastern pillar of the chamber, Ramesses III is shown before a group of genii, a standing monkey holding a bow and two kneeling baboons, before Ra-Horakhty. Inscriptions appear on the north-western pillar, and Ramesses III is represented on its southern face. On the south-western pillar, Ramesses III is represented with incense before Shu and then before Ra-Horakhty. On the south-eastern pillar, on its northern and western faces, Ramesses III is represented offering wine to Thoth and incense to Atum.

== See also ==
- Medinet Habu
- Pareherwenemef (20th dynasty)
- Ramesses III
- Theban Necropolis
- Valley of the Queens

== Bibliography ==
- Demas, Martha; Agnew, Neville (2012). Valley of the Queens Assessment Report, Volume 1: Conservation and Management Planning (PDF). Los Angeles: Getty Conservation Institute.
- Demas, Martha; Agnew, Neville (2016). Valley of the Queens Assessment Report, Volume 2: Assessment of 18th, 19th, and 20th Dynasty Tombs (PDF). Los Angeles: Getty Conservation Institute.
- Dodson, Aidan; Hilton, Dyan (2004). The Complete Royal Families of Ancient Egypt. London: Thames & Hudson. ISBN 978-0-500-05128-3.
- Schiaparelli, Ernesto (1924). Esplorazione della "Valle delle Regine" nella necropoli di Tebe. Relazione sui lavori della Missione archeologica italiana in Egitto (anni 1903-1920) (in Italian). Vol. 1. Turin: Casa editrice Giovanni Chiantore.
