= Aa (architect) =

Ancient Egyptian architect of the Middle Kingdom

- ʿȝʿȝ
- Born: Unknown
- Died: Unknown
- Other name: AaAa
- Occupations: Architect; construction supervisor
- Years active: fl. c. 1850 BC
- Era: Middle Kingdom of Egypt
- Known for: Funerary stele from Abydos

Aa, possibly AaAa (ˁȝˁȝ^{a}; fl. c. 1850 BC), was an ancient Egyptian architect and construction supervisor. His title was "Overseer of Construction Workers" or "Great Overseer of Construction Workers". He lived in the time of the Middle Kingdom of Egypt (between 2080 BC and 1640 BC).

Aa is one of several names on a funerary stele from the northern necropolis of Abydos. The connection between Aa and the depicted Sahepu is unclear. The reading of the name is problematic; it is not clear whether the first element Aa (Ancient Egyptian for 'great') forms part of the name or whether it is an adjective as part of the title.

== Notes ==
^a Ancient Egyptian-language romanization.

== Bibliography ==
- Ranke, Hermann (1935). Die ägyptischen Personennamen (in German). Vol. I: Verzeichnis der Namen. Glückstadt: J.J. Augustin. OCLC 1101247749.
- Saleh, Mohamed (2006). "Kairo, Ägyptisches Museum (RWG)". Der Neue Pauly (in German). Brill. doi:10.1163/1574-9347_dnp_e1408070.
- Ward, William A. (1982). Index of Egyptian Administrative and Religious Titles of the Middle Kingdom. Beirut: American University of Beirut. OCLC 11948366.
- Friedhelm Hoffmann, Christiane von Pfeil and Klein Ellguth: (Aa)Aa. In: Rainer Vollkommer: Künstlerlexikon der Antike, Nikol, Hamburg 2007, p. 1 ISBN 978-3-937872-53-7.
