= Ipuki =

Ancient Egyptian sculptor

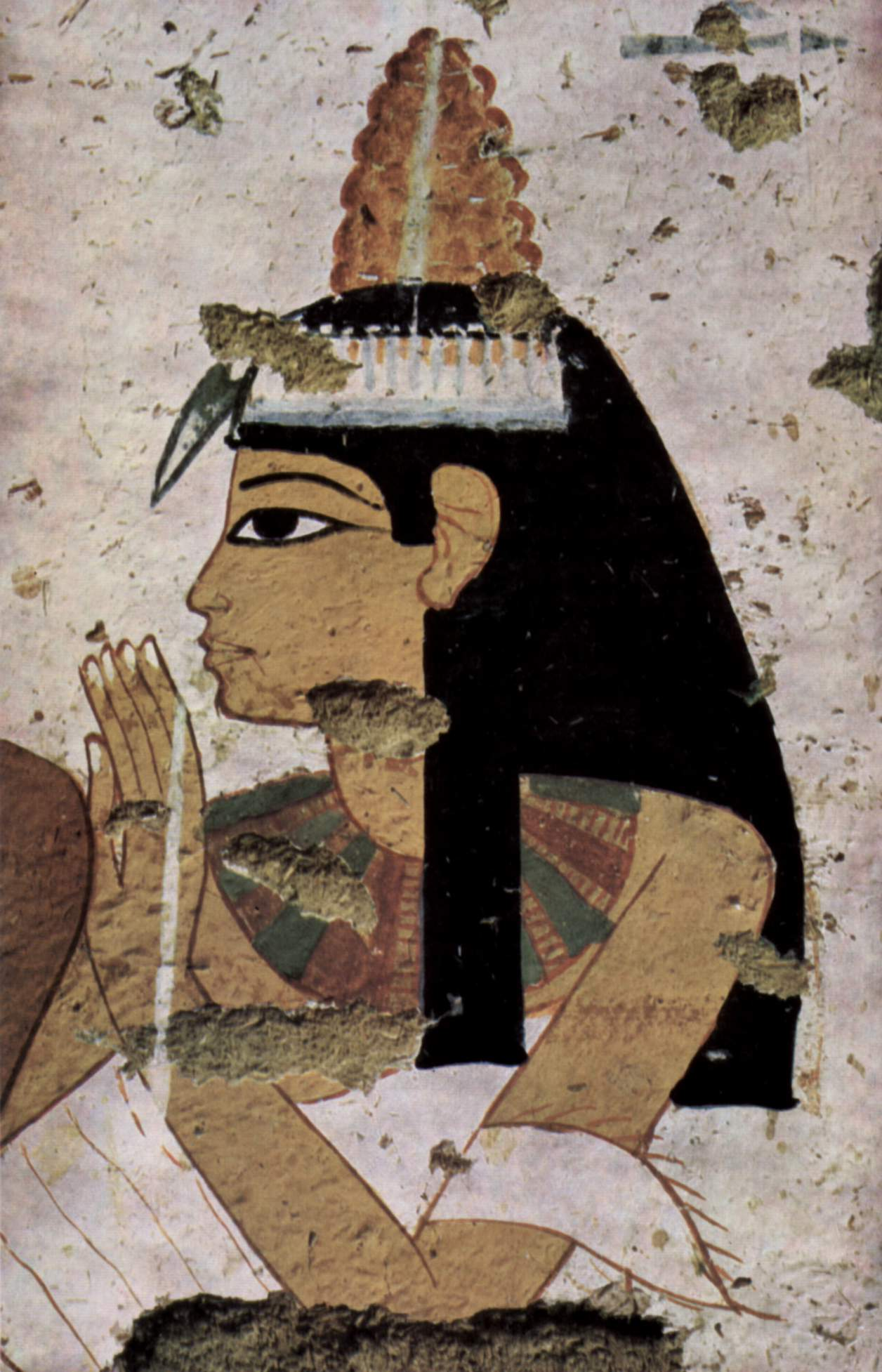
Image of the wife of Ipuki in tomb TT181

Ipuki (fl. c. 1390 BC) was an ancient Egyptian sculptor of the 18th Dynasty, who worked in Thebes and is known from his tomb there.

Ipuki was the son of Senetjer. He was active during the reigns of Thutmose IV and Amenhotep III and probably worked on both their tombs. He is known today mostly because of his tomb (TT181) in Thebes, whose inscriptions provide information on him, including his title, "Chief of the Sculptors of the Lord of the Two Lands". He shared the tomb with another sculptor named Nebamun, with whom he may have worked. Nebamun probably married Ipuki's widow and gained access to his tomb for this reason. In the grave, Ipuki is depicted in front of his wife. Whether he worked on the tomb himself is unclear. The joint tomb is the last tomb of an artist in the Valley of the Nobles at Thebes; later Theban artists were buried at Deir el-Medina, where the artisans who worked on the graves lived. It is unclear whether the outliner Hi mentioned in the inscriptions in the tomb was the brother of Ipuki or (more likely) of Nebamun.

== Bibliography ==
- Sandra Luisa Lippert: Nebimen (I). In Rainer Vollkommer (Ed.): Künstlerlexikon der Antike. Saur, München, Leipzig 2004, ISBN 3-598-11412-5, p. 551.
- Yvonne Ott: Ipuki. In: Rainer Vollkommer (Ed.): Künstlerlexikon der Antike. Saur, München, Leipzig 2004, ISBN 3-598-11412-5, pp. 360–361.
