= Rainer Vollkommer =

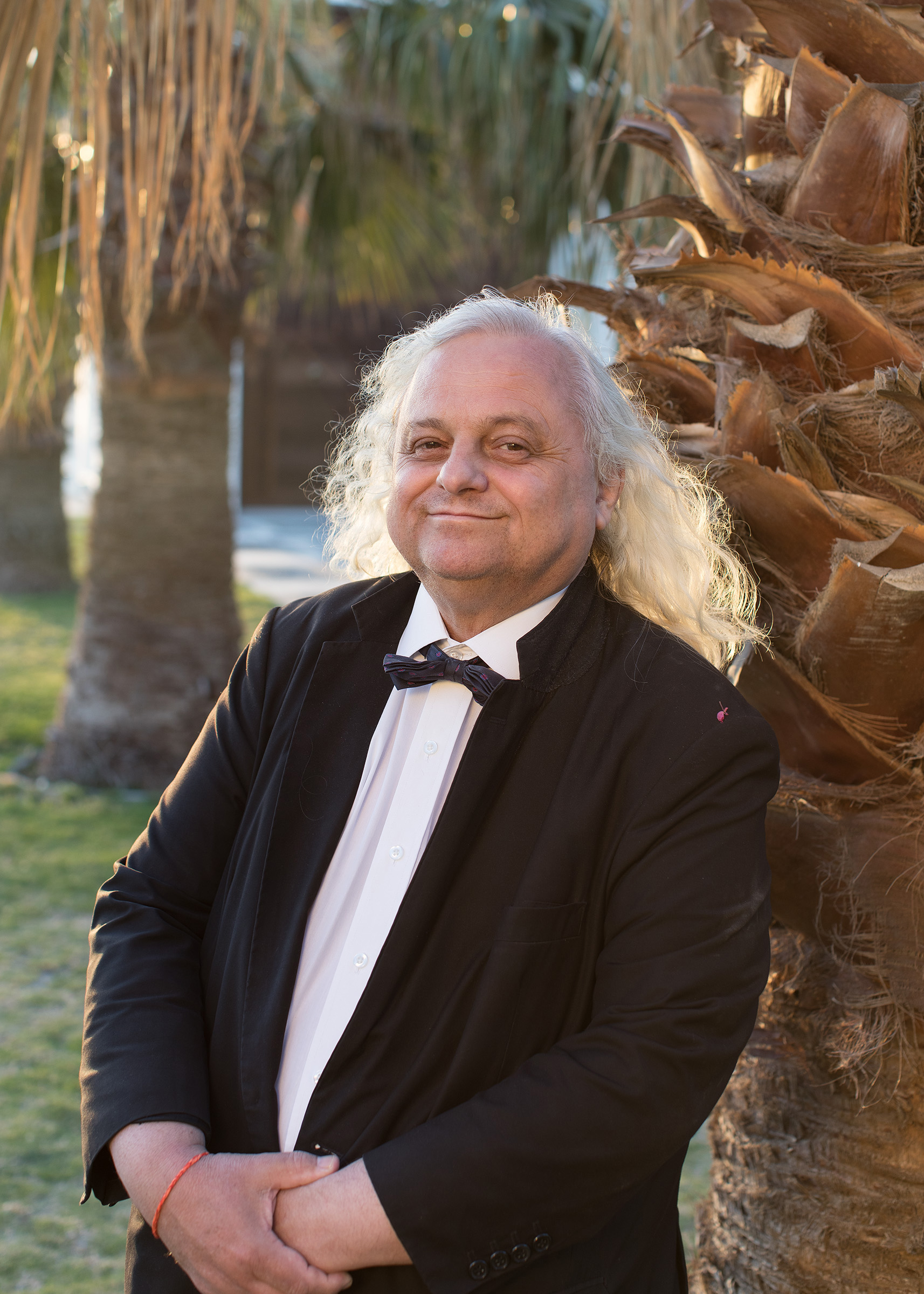
Rainer Vollkommer photographed by Oliver Mark, Bahrain 2022

Rainer Vollkommer (born 20 July 1959 in Munich) is a German-Swiss classical archaeologist and art historian.

== Biography ==
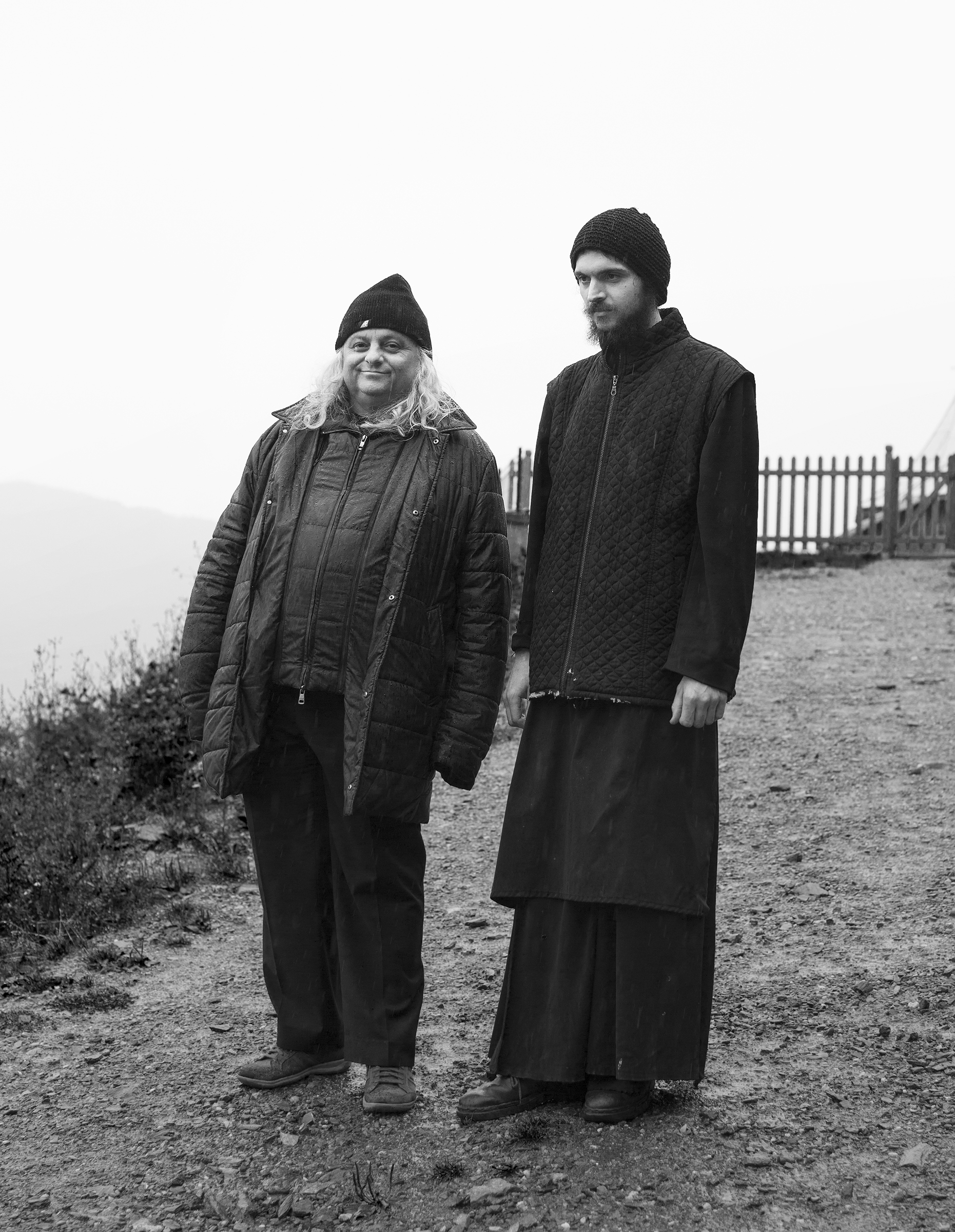
Rainer Vollkommer with Orthodox monk at St. John Iacob Monastery, Corlăteni, Romania 2018

Rainer Vollkommer studied classical archaeology, prehistory, history of art, egyptology and Near and Middle Eastern archaeology at LMU Munich, between 1978 and 1979. He graduated in 1981 with a Bachelor of Arts (Licence en art et archéologie) at the university of Paris IV-Sorbonne where he completed also the master's degree (Maîtrise en art et archéologie) one year later. From 1981 to 1984, he pursued his doctorate degree at Lincoln College, University of Oxford. The supervisor of the doctorate thesis was Sir John Boardman. From 1984 to 1994, Vollkommer worked as a scientific editor at the Lexicon Iconographicum Mythologiae Classicae (LIMC) in Basle, a NGO (non-governmental organization) of the UNESCO. In addition he taught as a lecturer at the universities of Freiburg in Breisgau in Germany (1985-1994) and of Fribourg in Switzerland (1989-1994). From 1994 to 1998, Vollkommer was lecturer (Oberassistent) at the Institute of Classical Archaeology of the University of Leipzig and chief curator of the Museum of Antiquities of the University of Leipzig, where he took part in building the Museum of Antiquities of the University of Leipzig. From 1998 to 2000, he was Professor (substitution) of Classical Archaeology at the Albert Ludwigs University of Freiburg in Breisgau in Germany.

Between 2000 and 2002, Vollkommer was art dealer and expert at the Jean-David Cahn AG in Basle. From 2002 to 2011, Vollkommer was director of the State Museum of Prehistory at Dresden and of the Archaeological Archive of Saxony which were part of the Saxon State Office for Archaeology. In December 2009 he was appointed honorary professor at the Dresden University of Technology.

Vollkommer was director of the Liechtenstein National Museum in Vaduz from April 2011 to July 2024. The Room of Industry at the Liechtenstein National Museum, the complete renewed Postal Museum and in 1915 the new Museum «Treasure Chamber Liechtenstein“ were installed during his direction. In 2023, he became president of the Winckelmann Society in Stendal, having been a member of the board of trustees since 2006 and vice-president since 2009.

He married the archaeologist Doris Vollkommer-Glökler in 1990. They have one daughter.

=== Memberships ===
Vollkommer was president of the association „Museums and Castles of the region of the Lake Constance (Museen und Schlösser Euregio Bodensee e.V).“ (over 100 museums and institutions of the region of the Lake Constance, Germany, Austria, Switzerland and Liechtenstein), between 2012 and 2015. Vollkommer was founding and board member of «Experience Vaduz» (Erlebe Vaduz, location marketing of the Capital of Liechtenstein), between 2015 and 2023. From 2019 to 2023, he was secretary of EEN (European Exhibition Network). He was member of different international institutions as national correspondent of NEMO (The Network of European Museum Organisations), national correspondent of EMF (European Museum Forum) / EMYA (European Museum Year Award), member of the meeting of the directors of the national museums of Austria, Liechtenstein and South Tyrol. He was member of the working team (Arbeitskreis) of the German speaking museums of history and also board member of the Austrian Association of Museums and board member of the association „Museums and Castles of the region of the Lake Constance (Museen und Schlösser Euregio Bodensee e.V).“

=== Additional Activities ===
Since the beginning of the 2010s, Vollkommer was highly committed to the field of digital innovation in museums. The newly established Postal Museum was equipped with a digital letter catalog and a digital travel route from Milan to Lindau. In collaboration with the Institute of Information Systems at the University of Liechtenstein, a crowdsourcing Facebook competition was developed, as well as an augmented reality project for an exhibition with a research project on the effects of augmented reality within virtual learning environments. Other initiatives included the Instagram and Twitter media wall "Liechtenstein Moments," the Digital Museum Innovation Summit, innovation lab project seminars like "Print My Postcard," and the Children's Museum App.

He participated in the four-year EU project "smARTplaces," in which 7 museums from 5 countries and 2 universities from 2 additional countries took part, with Rainer Vollkommer being part of the steering group. Several apps and audio guides in many languages were also created. Furthermore, it was always of great importance to Rainer Vollkommer to enliven a museum through a wide variety of events. For example, at the Liechtenstein National Museum, the number of events increased from around 20 per year when he arrived to 200 per year. In addition to more typical lectures, discussions, readings, and guided tours, small theater performances and dances were also staged.

Notably, many music events were held in Leipzig, Dresden, and Vaduz, including classical music, opera, choral, and folk singing, as well as folk and Latin American music, and rap. In Dresden, in addition to the first major fashion show in East Germany after reunification, the largest disco and music events in Saxony were organized, with between 1,500 and 5,000 participants (e.g., Strawberry Disco and Palais Sommer, both of which were first held during Vollkommer's tenure). Evening presentations held in collaboration with embassies and consulates, where a country was showcased through films, photos, discussions, music events, and tastings, were also of great importance.

== Exhibitions ==
More than 120 special exhibitions were presented under his twelve years of direction. Many of these exhibitions were curated by Rainer Vollkommer. The exhibitions showed a wide range of topics: history, art, culture, customs, society, environment, nature, music, industry and mathematics. Many exhibitions were shown later on in other countries. Many block-buster exhibitions were created. Exhibitions were made in collaboration with more than 20 countries. Some of the exhibitions got loans from 20 to 40 countries. A lot of exhibitions about Liechtenstein were presented, too.

=== Selected exhibitions ===
- 2011/12: Fischwelten [Fishworlds], Liechtenstein National Museum, Vaduz
- 2011/12: Brieföffner [Letter Opener], Postal Museum, Vaduz
- 2012: Besa: Eine Sache der Ehre – Wie muslimische Albaner Juden retteten [BESA: A Matter of Honor – How Albanian Muslims Rescued Jews], Liechtenstein National Museum, Vaduz (in collaboration with Yad Vashem)
- 2012: 1712 – Das Werden eines Landes [1712 – A Country Emerges], Liechtenstein National Museum, Vaduz
- 2012/13: Astrophilatelie [Astrophilately], Liechtenstein National Museum, Vaduz
- 2013: Oliver Marks Blick auf Liechtensteins Staatsfeiertag [Oliver Mark's View of Liechtenstein's National Day], Liechtenstein National Museum, Vaduz
- 2014: Filz…In Bewegung [Felt...In Motion], Liechtenstein National Museum, Vaduz
- 2013/14: Briefe und Texte – Juwelen von Dichterhandschriften aus der deutschen Literatur des 18. und 19. Jh. [Letters and Texts – Jewelry of Poet's Writings of the German Literature of the 18th and 19th Centuries], Postal Museum, Vaduz
- 2014/15: Der Heilige Nikolaus – Geheimnisvolles, Erdichtetes und Wahres [The Holy Nicolaus - Mysterious, Fictitious and Reality], Liechtenstein National Museum, Vaduz (in collaboration with Max Kunze)
- 2014/15: Winterolympiaden – Briefmarken aus der Sammlung des ehemaligen Schachweltmeisters Anatoli Karpow [Winter Olympiads – Stamps from the Collection of the former Chess World Master Anatoly Karpov], Postal Museum, Vaduz
- 2015: Logos # Mythos – Doncho Donchev [Logos # Myth – Doncho Donchev], Liechtenstein National Museum, Vaduz
- 2015: Family – Werke von Alex Doll [Family – Works of Alex Doll], Liechtenstein National Museum, Vaduz
- 2015/16: Marilyn – die starke Monroe [Marilyn – The Strong Monroe], Liechtenstein National Museum, Vaduz (in collaboration with Ted Stampfer)
- 2015: Ein halber Quadtrameter Freiheit – Bilder aus der Haft [Half a Square Meter of Freedom – Paintings from Prisons], Liechtenstein National Museum, Vaduz (in collaboration with Peter Echtermeyer)
- 2015: Sagen und Märchen in Meisterwerken Uraler Steinkünstler [Legends and Fairy Tales in Ural Stone Carving], Liechtenstein National Museum, Vaduz
- 2015/16: Maria – Schätze aus dem Lindenau-Museum in Altenburg [Maria – Treasures of the Lindenau-Museum in Altenburg], Liechtenstein National Museum, Vaduz
- 2016: Chinesische Tierkreiszeichen auf Briefmarken aus dem Shengxiao Briefmarken-Museum (China) in Suzhou [Chinese Zodiacs on stamps from the Shengxiao Stamp-Museum (China) in Suzhou], Liechtenstein National Museum, Vaduz
- 2016/17: Mythos Olympische Spiele – Von der Antike bis zur Gegenwart [Myth Olympic Games – From Antiquity to Present Times], Liechtenstein National Museum, Vaduz
- 2016/17: Natura Morta – Oliver Mark, Liechtenstein National Museum, Vaduz
- 2017: Grenzen überschreiten – Kana-Kunst von Kaoru Akagawa [Passing Boundaries – The Art of Kana by Kaoru Akagawa], Liechtenstein National Museum, Vaduz
- 2017: Grenzen Los – Globalisierung und Identität [Beyond Boundaries – Globalisation and Identity], Liechtenstein National Museum, Vaduz
- 2017: Christliche Kunst aus Bulgarien [Christian Art from Bulgaria], Liechtenstein National Museum, Vaduz
- 2017: Grosse Steppe zu Besuch bei den weisen Bergen [Great Steppe Visiting the Wise Mountains], Liechtenstein National Museum, Vaduz
- 2017: Olé Dali und Freudismen – Werke von Dimitrije Popovic [Olé Dali and Freudisms – Works of Dimitrije Popovic], Liechtenstein National Museum, Vaduz
- 2017/18: Faszination Pyramiden [Faszination Pyramids], Liechtenstein National Museum, Vaduz (in collaboration with Christian Tietze)
- 2017/18: Hannes Schmid – Concerned Photography, Liechtenstein National Museum, Vaduz
- 2018: Zwischen hier und dort – Bilder aus der Haft [Between here and there - Paintings from Prisons], Liechtenstein National Museum, Vaduz (in collaboration with Peter Echtermeyer)
- 2018: Kleine Schätze aus Amiens [Small Cabinets of Curiosity], Liechtenstein National Museum, Vaduz
- 2018: Die Welt des Han Meilin [The World of Han Meilin], Liechtenstein National Museum, Vaduz
- 2018: Eleganz und Geniessen – Alltagsleben, Weisheiten und Kunst in der chinesischen Kultur. Literati und Qi Baishi [Elegance and Enjoyment - Daily Life, Wisdom and Art in the Chinese Culture. Literati and Qi Baishi], Liechtenstein National Museum, Vaduz (in collaboration with Minming Wang)
- 2019: Gedanken – Leng Bingchuan [Thoughts – Leng Bingchuan], Liechtenstein National Museum, Vaduz
- 2019: Bukowina – Klöster leben – Oliver Mark [Bucovina – Monastery Life – Oliver Mark], Liechtenstein National Museum, Vaduz
- 2019: Goldene Schuhe – Fotografien aus der Sammlung des Liechtensteinischen Landesmuseums von Oliver Mark [Golden Shoes – Photos by Oliver Mark in the Collection of the Liechtenstein National Museum], Liechtenstein National Museum, Vaduz
- 2019/20: 1719 – 300 Jahre Fürstentum Liechtenstein [1719 – 300 Years of the Principality of Liechtenstein], Liechtenstein National Museum, Vaduz
- 2019: 50 Jahre Mondlandung [50 Years since the Moon Landing], Postal Museum, Vaduz (in collaboration with the Society of Astrophilately)
- 2019: Diese Katze ist die Sonne selbst – Am Anfang gegenseitiger Begegnung [This Cat is the Sun Itself – In the Beginning of Meeting Each Other], Liechtenstein National Museum, Vaduz (in collaboration with Wolfgang Wettengel)
- 2019/20: Die Farben von Mexiko – Briefmarken erzählen die Geschichte Mexikos [The Colors of Mexico – Stamps tell about the History of Mexico], Postal Museum, Vaduz
- 2020: Literatur, Literati, Literati-Malerei: Kunst von Chen Lyusheng [Literature, Literati, Literati-Painting: Art from Chen Lyusheng], Liechtenstein National Museum, Vaduz
- 2020: Tuschmalereien – Zhang Ding [Ink Paintings – Zhang Ding], Liechtenstein National Museum, Vaduz
- 2020: Faust in Edelstein – Die grössten Kameen der Welt präsentieren Goethes Faust [Faust in Gemstone – The Biggest Cameos of the World show the Faust of Goethe], Liechtenstein National Museum, Vaduz
- 2020/21: Astrophilatelie – Bemannte Raumstationen [Astrophilately – Manned Space Stations], Postal Museum, Vaduz (in collaboration with the Society of Astrophilately)
- 2020/21: Nibelungenlied – Genia Chef [Song of the Nibelungs – Genia Chef], Liechtenstein National Museum, Vaduz
- 2021: Märchen, Sagen und Symbole [Fairy Tales, Legends and Symbols], Liechtenstein National Museum, Vaduz
- 2021/22: Stimmen aus der Arktis [Voices from the Arctic], Liechtenstein National Museum, Vaduz
- 2021/22: Pompeji – Pracht und Tod unter dem Vulkan [Pompeii – Splendor and Death under the Volcan], Liechtenstein National Museum, Vaduz
- 2022: Haarblüten und Kunstblumen – Erinnerungsbilder an Lebensstationen [Hair Flowers and Artificial Flowers – Souvenir Images of Life Stages], Liechtenstein National Museum, Vaduz
- 2022: Chinesische Bambusschnitzkunst aus dem Shanghai Museum [Art of Chinese Bamboo Carving from the Shanghai Museum], Liechtenstein National Museum, Vaduz
- 2022: 5000 Jahre Esskultur in China – Schätze aus dem Chinesischen Nationalmuseum [5000 Years of Food Culture in China – Treasures of the Chinese National Museum], Liechtenstein National Museum, Vaduz
- 2022: Spectrum – Rashid Al Khalifa, Liechtenstein National Museum, Vaduz
- 2022: Kopfschmuck, Tracht und Identität – Europa, Asien, Afrika [Head Adornment, Traditional Costume and Identity – Europe, Asia, Africa], Liechtenstein National Museum, Vaduz)
- 2022: Cusp – Rashid Al Khalifa, Liechtenstein National Museum, Vaduz
- 2022/23: Wappenbriefe für Europa [Documents of Coat of Arms for Europe], Liechtenstein National Museum, Vaduz
- 2023: Kauernder Tiger, verborgener Drache – Der Charme von chinesischer Kalligraphie [Crouching Tiger, Hidden Dragon – The Charm of Chinese Calligraphy], Liechtenstein National Museum, Vaduz
- 2023: Ion Irimescu, Ion Mândrescu – Geheimnis und Erfüllung in der rumänischen Skulptur [Ion Irimescu, Ion Mândrescu – Secret and Fulfillment in the Rumanian Sculpture], Liechtenstein National Museum, Vaduz

== Publications ==
Rainer Vollkommer authored six books, edited over 60 books/catalogs/encyclopedias, wrote around 50 major articles in academic journals, and contributed more than 2,000 entries to various encyclopedias. He served as a scientific advisor for Brockhaus Archaeology, Geo Theme Encyclopedia of Archaeology, ADAC's Book of Millions of Years, and World History in 20 Volumes (Bertelsmann).

=== Monographs ===
- Herakles in the Art of Classical Greece. Oxford University School of Archaeology, Oxford 1989, ISBN 0-947816-25-9 (= Dissertation).
- Unteritalische Vasen. Leipziger Universitätsverlag, Leipzig 1995, ISBN 3-929031-86-8 (Kleine Reihe des Antiken-Museums der Universität Leipzig. Band 2).
- Sternstunden der Archäologie. C. H. Beck, München 2000, ISBN 3-406-45935-8.
- Neue Sternstunden der Archäologie. C. H. Beck, München 2006, ISBN 3-406-55058-4.
- Das antike Griechenland. Theiss, Stuttgart 2007, ISBN 3-8062-2045-X.
- Das römische Weltreich. Theiss, Stuttgart 2008, ISBN 978-3-8062-2078-0.

=== Editorialships ===
- Französische Archäologie heute. Einblicke in Ausgrabungen. Leipziger Universitätsverlag, Leipzig 1997, ISBN 3-931922-43-X (Veröffentlichungen des Frankreich-Zentrums. Publications of the France-Centre volume 3).
- Künstlerlexikon der Antike. 2 volumes, K. G. Saur, Leipzig/München 2001–2004, ISBN 3-598-11412-5.
  - Vol. 1: A – K, 2001, ISBN 3-598-11413-3.
  - Vol. 2: L – Z, 2004, ISBN 3-598-11414-1.
    - § Reprint in one volume: Künstlerlexikon der Antike. Over 3800 artists of three millennia. Nikol, Hamburg 2007, ISBN 978-3-937872-53-7.
- with Donat Büchel: 1712 – Das Werden eines Landes. Liechtensteinisches Landesmuseum, Vaduz 2012.
- Im Dienst des Friedens: überwindet das Böse mit Gutem; Haakon Nederland’s Eindrücke nach der Rheinkatastrophe von 1927. Liechtensteinisches Landesmuseum, Vaduz 2013, ISBN 978-3-9524602-5-2.
- Oliver Marks Blick auf Liechtensteins Staatsfeiertag. Fotografien: Oliver Mark, Alpenland-Verlag, Schaan 2013, ISBN 978-3-905437-34-8.
- Anschluss oder weiterhin souverän? Liechtenstein 1938. Liechtensteinisches Landesmuseum, Vaduz 2013, ISBN 978-3-9523276-7-8.
- Geopythafibotonpolyhypotesaeder! Matheliebe. Alpenland-Verlag Schaan, Liechtensteinisches Landesmuseum, Vaduz 2013, ISBN 978-3-905437-33-1.
- Gladiatoren und Kolosseum. Helden und Architektur im Dienst der Mächtigen. Liechtensteinisches Landesmuseum, Vaduz 2014, ISBN 978-3-9524259-0-9.
- with Max Kunze: Ostereier zwischen Kult und Kunst. Verlag Rutzen and Liechtensteinisches Landesmuseum, Vaduz 2014, ISBN 978-3-447-10183-7 (Rutzen) und ISBN 978-3-9524259-1-6 (Liechtensteinisches Landesmuseum).
- Die Spuren Roms in der Provinz. Archäologische Funde aus Liechtenstein. Liechtenstein 1938. Liechtensteinisches Landesmuseum, Vaduz 2014, ISBN 978-3-9524259-2-3.
- with Max Kunze: Gab es den Heiligen Nikolaus wirklich? Liechtensteinisches Landesmuseum, Vaduz 2014, ISBN 978-3-9524259-7-8.
- with Max Kunze: Heiliger Nikolaus – Leben und Wirkung des Nikolaos von Myra. Verlag Rutzen und Liechtensteinisches Landesmuseum, Vaduz 2014, ISBN 978-3-447-10306-0 (Rutzen) und ISBN 978-3-9524259-6-1 (Liechtensteinisches Landesmuseum.
- Georg Malin als Briefmarkengestalter: Aquarelle und Zeichnungen. Liechtensteinisches Landesmuseum, Vaduz 2014, ISBN 978-3-9524400-2-5.
- Der Heilige Nikolaus – Geheimnisvolles, Erdichtetes und Wahres. Nikolausdarstellungen aus der Oblast Wologda. Liechtensteinisches Landesmuseum, Vaduz 2015, ISBN 978-3-9524259-8-5.
- Die Ära Napoleons im Spiegel seiner Medaillen. Liechtensteinisches Landesmuseum, Vaduz 2015, ISBN 978-3-9524259-9-2.
- with Peter Echtermeyer: Ein halber Quadratmeter Freiheit – Bilder aus der Haft. Liechtensteinisches Landesmuseum, Vaduz 2015, ISBN 978-3-9524400-4-9.
- Maria – Schätze aus dem Lindenau-Museum Altenburg. Liechtensteinisches Landesmuseum, Vaduz 2015, ISBN 978-3-9524400-6-3.
- Marilyn. Die starke Monroe. Liechtensteinisches Landesmuseum, Vaduz 2015, ISBN 978-3-9524400-0-1.
- Sagen und Märchen in Meisterwerken Uraler Steinkünstler. Liechtensteinisches Landesmuseum, Vaduz 2015, ISBN 978-3-9524400-3-2.
- Art Domino, Pal Sarkozy. Liechtensteinisches Landesmuseum, Vaduz 2015, ISBN 978-3-9524259-4-7.
- Schatzkammer Liechtenstein. Liechtensteinisches Landesmuseum, Vaduz 2015, ISBN 978-3-9524400-1-8.
- Natura Morta. Fotografien: Oliver Mark. Kehrer Verlag, Heidelberg 2016, ISBN 978-3-86828-759-2.
- 1866 Liechtenstein im Krieg vor 150 Jahren. Liechtensteinisches Landesmuseum, Vaduz 2016, ISBN 978-3-9524602-0-7.
- Alex Doll. Ansichten von Liechtenstein. Liechtensteinisches Landesmuseum, Vaduz 2016, ISBN 978-3-9524400-7-0.
- Louis Jäger als Briefmarkengestalter: Aquarelle und Zeichnungen. Liechtensteinisches Landesmuseum, Vaduz 2016, ISBN 978-3-9524602-4-5.
- Helden. Geschichte in Meisterwerken Uraler Steinkünstler. Liechtensteinisches Landesmuseum, Vaduz 2016, ISBN 978-3-9524400-8-7.
- Mythos Olympische Spiele. Von der Antike bis zur Gegenwart. Liechtensteinisches Landesmuseum, Vaduz 2017, ISBN 978-3-9524602-3-8.
- Bruno Kaufmann als Briefmarkengestalter. Liechtensteinisches Landesmuseum, Vaduz 2017, ISBN 978-3-9524602-7-6.
- with Christian Tietze: Faszination Pyramiden. Liechtensteinisches Landesmuseum, Vaduz 2017, ISBN 978-3-9524602-9-0.
- Grenzen Los. Globalisierung und Identität. Privatsammlung zeitgenössischer Kunst von Wiyu Wahono. Liechtensteinisches Landesmuseum, Vaduz 2017, ISBN 978-3-9524602-5-2.
- Kult & Kultur. Ikonen. Sammlung Wemhöner Grabher. Liechtensteinisches Landesmuseum, Vaduz 2017, ISBN 978-3-9523276-9-2.
- with Peter Echtermeyer: Zwischen hier und dort. Liechtensteinisches Landesmuseum, Vaduz 2018, ISBN 978-3-9524770-0-7.
- with Minming Wang: Eleganz und Geniessen. Alltagsleben, Weisheiten und Kunst in der chinesischen Kultur. Liechtensteinisches Landesmuseum, Vaduz 2018, ISBN 978-3-9524770-1-4.
- 300 Jahre Fürstentum Liechtenstein. 1719–2019. Liechtensteinisches Landesmuseum, Vaduz 2019, ISBN 978-3-9524770-6-9.
- Bukowina – Klöster leben. Fotografien: Oliver Mark. Liechtensteinisches Landesmuseum, Vaduz 2019, ISBN 978-3-9524770-3-8.
- Diese Katze ist die Sonne selbst – Am Anfang gegenseitiger Begegnung. Liechtensteinisches Landesmuseum, Vaduz 2019, ISBN 978-3-9524770-7-6.
- with Peter Fritz, Franz Pieler and Wolfgang Wettengel: Märchen, Mythen und Symbole. WMB Weinviertel Museum Betrieb and Liechtensteinisches Landesmuseum, Vaduz 2019, ISBN 978-3-9504468-4-5 (WMB) und ISBN 978-3-9525059-9-1 (Liechtensteinisches Landesmuseum).
- with Yang Zhigan and Shi Yuan: Chinesische Bambusschnitzkunst aus dem Shanghai Museum. Liechtensteinisches Landesmuseum, Vaduz 2019, ISBN 978-3-9525059-9-1.
- Glanz im Fluss der Zeit. Ländlicher Schmuck und Tracht im Lebenslauf. Liechtensteinisches Landesmuseum, Vaduz 2020, ISBN 978-3-9524770-8-3.
- Nibelungenlied – Genia Chef. Verlag Ciconia und Liechtensteinisches Landesmuseum, Vaduz 2020, ISBN 978-3-9525059-1-5 (Liechtensteinisches Landesuseum) and ISBN 978-3-945867-36-5 (Ciconia).
- Liechtensteinische Sagen. Liechtensteinisches Landesmuseum, Vaduz 2020, ISBN 978-3-9525059-2-2.
- Tribute to Ibrahim Kodra. Liechtensteinisches Landesmuseum, Vaduz 2020, ISBN 978-3-9525059-0-8.
- with Peter Echtermeyer: Zurück ins Leben – Bilder aus der Haft. Liechtensteinisches Landesmuseum, Vaduz 2021, ISBN 978-3-9525059-4-6.
- Märchen, Sagen und Symbole. Liechtensteinisches Landesmuseum, Vaduz 2021, ISBN 978-3-9525059-3-9.
- Pompeji – Pracht und Tod unter dem Vulkan. Liechtensteinisches Landesmuseum, Vaduz 2021, ISBN 978-3-9525059-4-6.
- Stimmen aus der Arktis. Liechtensteinisches Landesmuseum, Vaduz 2021, ISBN 978-3-9525059-5-3.
- Wappenbriefe für Europa. Liechtensteinisches Landesmuseum, Vaduz 2022, ISBN 978-3-9525404-4-2.
- with Wang Chunfa: 5000 Jahre Esskultur in China. Liechtensteinisches Landesmuseum, Vaduz 2022, ISBN 978-3-9525404-5-9.
- with Max Kunze: Haarblüten und Kunstblumen – Erinnerungsbilder an Lebensstationen. Michael Imhof Verlag und Verlag Liechtensteinisches Landesmuseum, Vaduz 2022, ISBN 978-3-9525059-7-7.
- Kopfschmuck, Tracht und Identität – Europa, Asien, Afrika. Liechtensteinisches Landesmuseum, Vaduz 2022, ISBN 978-3-9525404-3-5.
- Spectrum – Rashid Al Khalifa. Liechtensteinisches Landesmuseum, Vaduz 2022, ISBN 978-3-9525404-0-4.
- with Constantin-Emil Ursu: Ion Irimescu Ion Mândrescu, Geheimnis und Erfüllung in der rumänischen Bildhauerei. Liechtensteinisches Landesmuseum, Vaduz 2023, ISBN 978-3-9525404-6-6.
- 50 Shapes of Prey. Liechtensteinisches Landesmuseum, Vaduz 2023, ISBN 978-3-9525404-1-1.
- Kauernder Tiger, verborgener Drache. Der Charm chinesischer Kalligraphie. Liechtensteinisches Landesmuseum, Vaduz 2023, ISBN 978-3-9525404-2-8.
