= Liechtenstein National Museum =

Museum in Vaduz, Liechtenstein

- Liechtensteinisches Landesmuseum

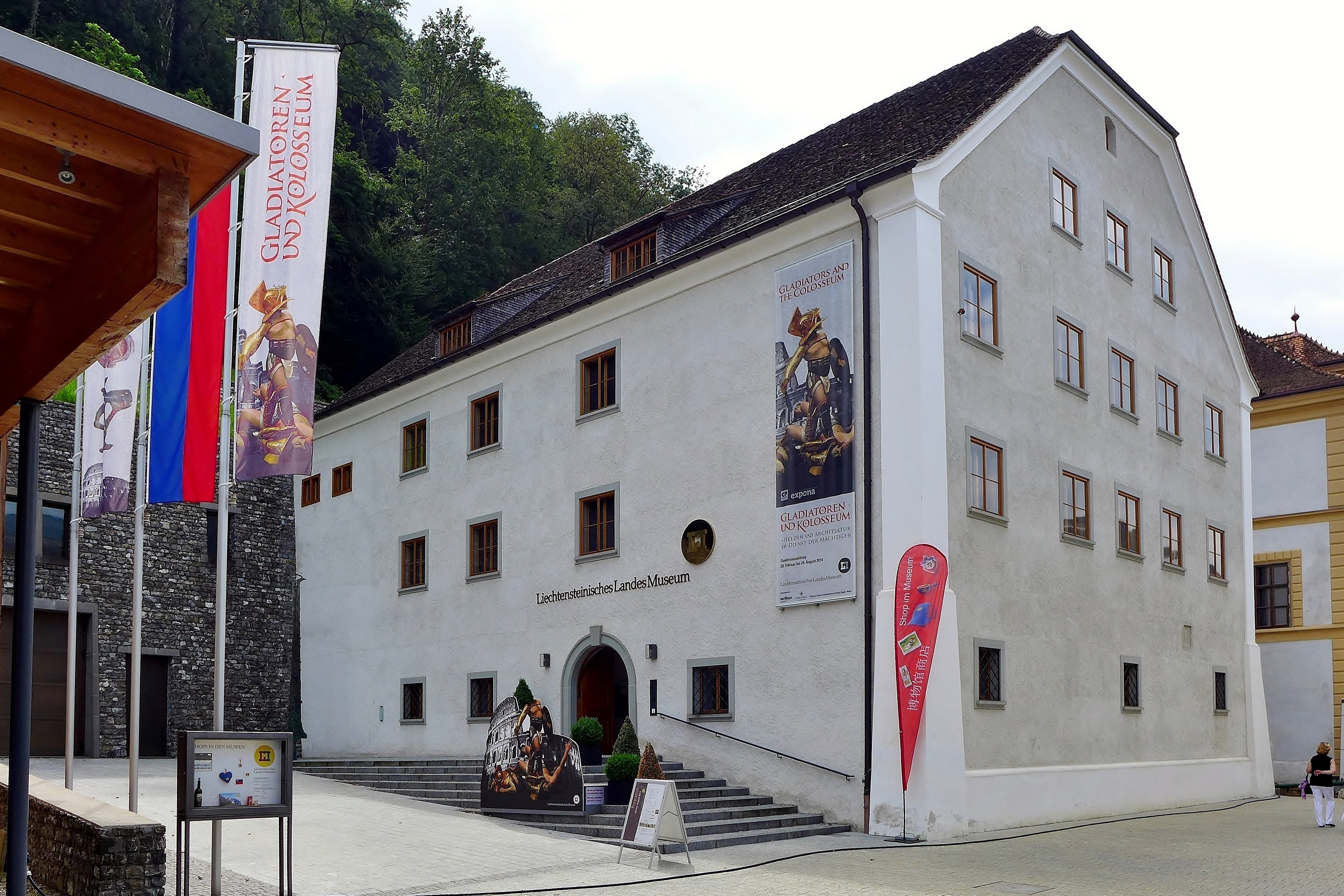
- Established: 1890
- Location: Vaduz, Liechtenstein
- Coordinates: 47°08′17.2″N 9°31′21.6″E
- Type: museum
- Website: Official website

The Liechtenstein National Museum (German: Liechtensteinisches Landesmuseum) is a museum in Vaduz, the capital city of Liechtenstein.

== History ==
The establishment of the museum originated from the idea of Governor Friedrich Stellwag von Carion. The museum was then established in 1890 in rooms at the Vaduz Castle. In 1914, due to the renovation works being carried out at the castle, the museum collections had to be moved several times to various buildings around the kingdom. In 1929, it was moved back to the castle. In 1954, the collections were moved to the National Bank building and it was then officially called the National Museum. In 1967, the government purchased the Taverne zum Adler building and renovated it to house the national museum. Later on the national museum moved to the building and reopened on 15 April 1972. The Liechtenstein National Museum Foundation was then established on 9 May 1972. In 1992, the museum was damaged due to the construction work on the piece of land beside the museum. The museum was subsequently closed. In 1999, the renovation and expansion work of the museum began, which resulted in the museum incorporated with another three buildings. The expanded building of the national museum was then opened on 28 November 2003. In 2006, the Postal Museum became part of the national museum which was opened earlier on in 1930. In 2015, the Treasure Chamber was established.

== Architecture ==
The museum current building dated back to 1438. It used to house the princely tavern, customs house and the seat of the government. Work was carried out in 1998–2008 to renovate the building and it was extended towards the mountain slope.

Liechtenstein National Museum consists of four parts, which are the main museum, Postal Museum, Treasure Chamber and Farm House Museum. The main museum consists of three parts, two which are the medieval buildings and a new building. It has a total exhibition area of 2,000 m^{2}. The Postal Museum and the Treasure Chamber are located in the Englishman building.

== Exhibitions ==
The museum displays both permanent and contemporary exhibitions. The display ranges from artifacts about the history, culture, nature and landscape of Liechtenstein in its three buildings and 42 exhibit rooms.

== See also ==
- Kunstmuseum Liechtenstein
