= Kaoru Akagawa =

Japanese artist

Kaoru Akagawa 赤川 薫
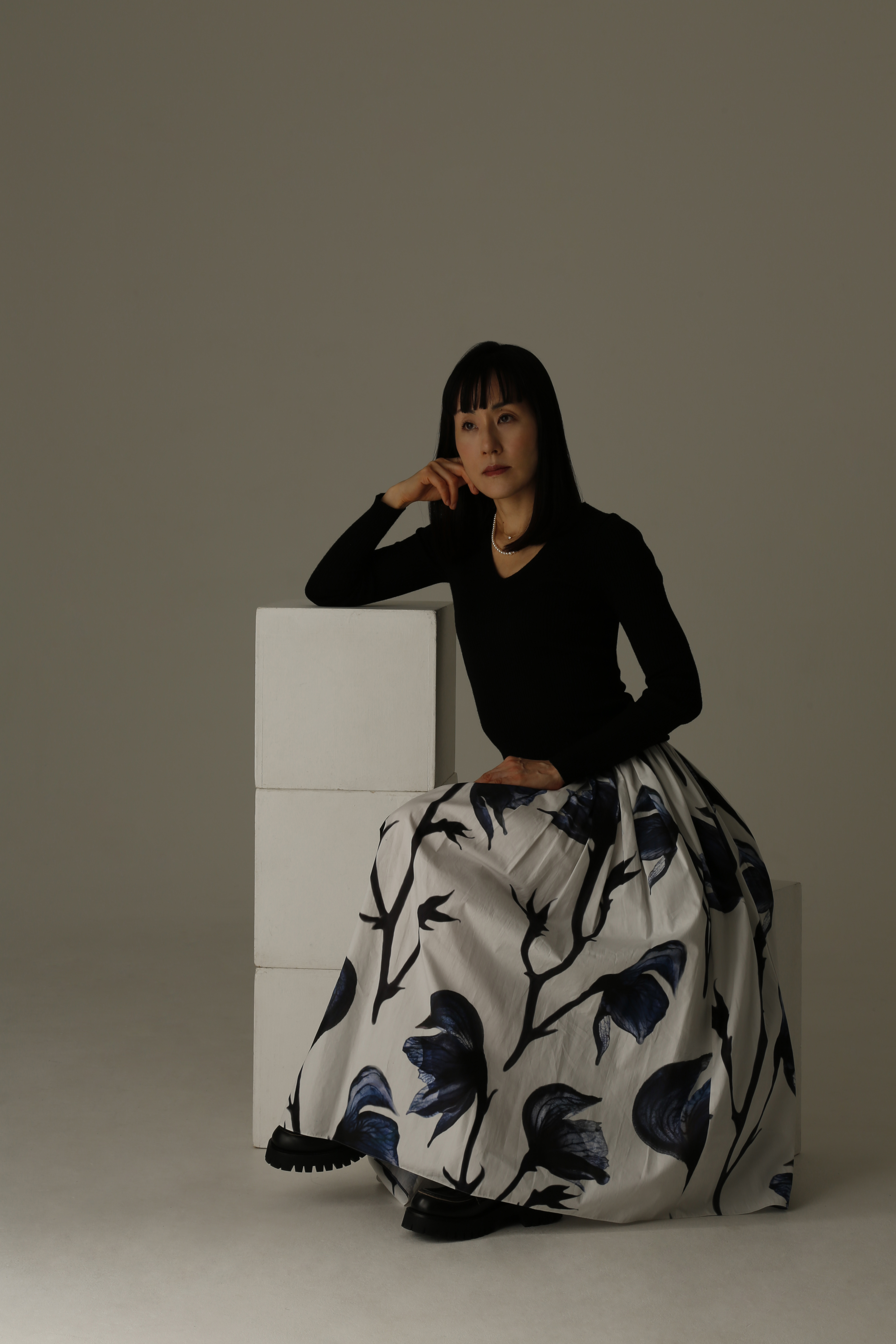
- Kaoru Akagawa, 2024
- Born: 1973 (age 52–53); Montreal, Canada
- Occupations: Artist, Railway photographer, Railway journalist
- Years active: 2010-
- Known for: Artist
- Website: www.meisterin-akagawa.jp

Kaoru Akagawa (赤川 薫, Kaoru Akagawa, born 1973) is a Japanese contemporary artist. Akagawa's unique style of art, where thousands of intricately interwoven kana meld to form larger images, is informed by her work as a calligrapher.

Akagawa’s art has been featured and reviewed by CNN, The Guardian, Deutsche Welle and BBC Radio and featured by The Avant/Garde Diaries, a video magazine initiated by Mercedes-Benz.

Akagawa has held exhibitions in Berlin, Paris, London and Tokyo. She has lectured at the University of Oxford, the University of London School of Advanced Study and the University of Zurich.

Akagawa is also active as a railway journalist and photographer and writes for British and Japanese railway magazines.

== Biography ==
Akagawa was born in Montreal, Canada, and spent her childhood in New York. At fifteen, she moved with her family to Japan. She received a Bachelor of Arts in Human Relations from Keio University in 1995. Since 2007, Akagawa is based in Europe.

After graduating from Keio University, she worked as a 3D computer graphic designer for television commercials, but gradually found herself conflicted with working in the capitalist advertising industry. She rejected digital technology and switched to traditional Japanese ink and brush as her medium.

In 2008, she became a Kana calligraphy master. Although she believes that tradition should be passed down to the next generation, at the same time, she feels that expressing herself within the constraints of tradition was no longer enough, and she began to feel a strong urge to go beyond traditional boundaries with her own artistic style.

She remembers seeing a painting by Georges Seurat at the MET Museum in New York when she was nine years old. He painted using small colored dots — a style which is called pointillism — and she remembered this painting and thought, "If he can paint with dots, then maybe I can paint with my Kana characters".

In 2010, Akagawa began creating her original artworks using kana characters. Through her new style of art, people without Japanese knowledge are also able to appreciate fluent lines of kana characters by gazing images created by the contrast of kana characters.

With these subtle works, which can take months to produce, Akagawa revitalizes a heritage while demonstrating how influential this system of writing still is in the modern world. Kaoru Akagawa presents her works on kana art in a wide range of two-dimensional and three-dimensional pieces. In both types of works, kana characters are not only writing but also aesthetic forms. In these works, Akagawa transcends the traditional form of kana, transforming the characters into visual art objects.

In 2022 she completed her Master of Arts in History of Art and Archaeology in University of London, School of Oriental and African Studies. In the same year, she began working as a railway photographer and journalist, providing photographs and writing for Japanese and British railway magazines and railway calendars.

== Personal life ==
Akagawa was highly pregnant when she started her master studies at SOAS and gave birth to her first child during her Christmas holiday. This was after prolonged infertility and repeated miscarriages. Some of her works are created based on her grief of miscarriages.

== Selected solo exhibitions ==
- Liechtenstein National Museum, Vaduz, Liechtenstein
- Gallery BOA-PARIS, Paris, France
- Ryosokuin, a sub-temple of Kenninji, the oldest Zen temple in Kyoto, Japan
