= Postal Museum (Liechtenstein) =

Museum in Vaduz, Liechtenstein

- Postmuseum
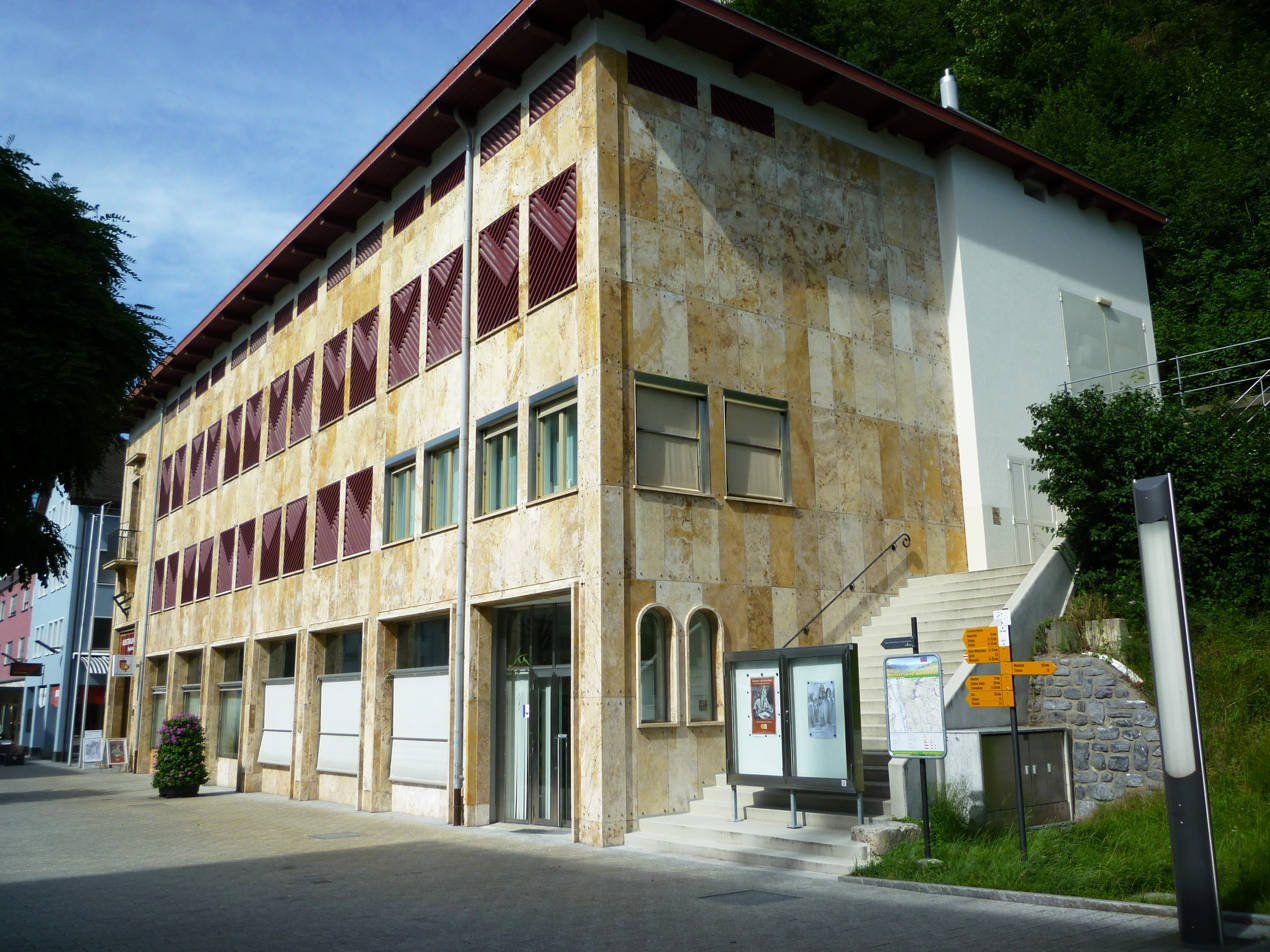

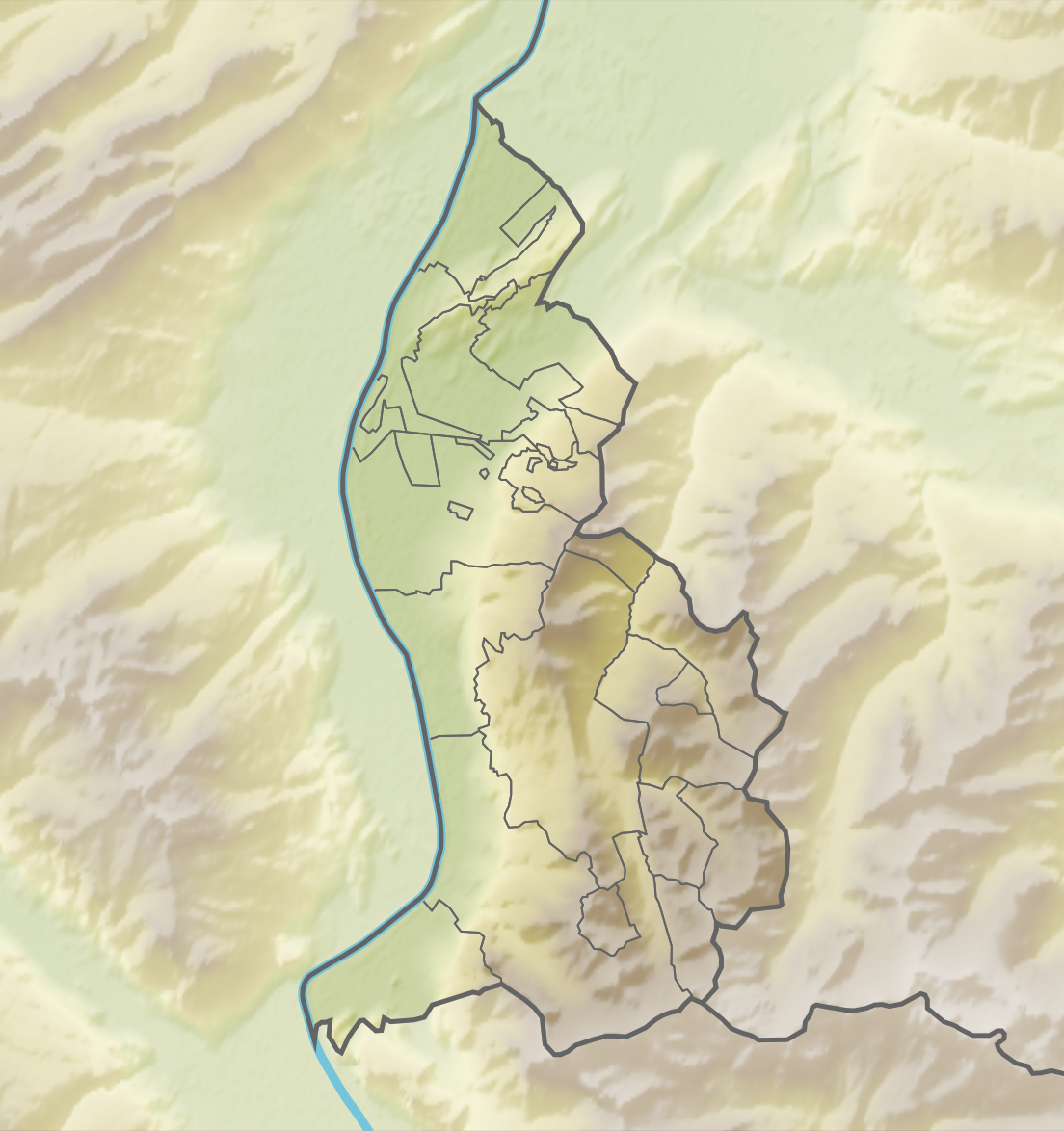
- Location within Liechtenstein
- Established: 1936
- Location: Vaduz, Liechtenstein
- Coordinates: 47°8′20″N 9°31′22″E
- Type: postal museum
- Website: Official website

The Postal Museum (German: Postmuseum) is a postal museum in Vaduz, Liechtenstein. It is a branch museum of Liechtenstein National Museum.

== History ==
The museum was originally founded in 1930 and opened its first exhibition to the public in 1936 in the new post office building in Vaduz. Afterwards, the museum had been relocated several times until it sits at its current location at English Building Art Space since 1957. In 1967, the Postage Stamp Design Office was established, and the office's head also became the director of the postal museum. In 2006, the postal museum was incorporated into the Liechtenstein National Museum. In 2018, the museum was heavily renovated, with many of its exhibitions were digitized. It was nominated for the European Museum of the Year award by the European Museum Forum in 2019.

== Architecture ==
The museum is located in Englishman Building, which was constructed in 1920 by an English. It features a souvenir shop.

== Exhibitions ==
The museum exhibits postage stamps issued by Liechtenstein since 1912 and also the history of postal service of the country. Themes of the stamps ranges from airmail, architecture, business and economy, Christmas, coat of arms, culture, customs, Europe, legends, nature and landscape, notable people, princely house, religion, sport, zodiac signs etc. It also needle plates, showcases designs and test prints. The digital exhibitions showcase the digitized version of the entire stamps issued by the country in an online catalogue. The museum also regularly holds special contemporary exhibitions.

== See also ==
- Kunstmuseum Liechtenstein
