= Hermann Ranke =

German Egyptologist (1878–1953)

Heinrich Johannes Hermann Ranke
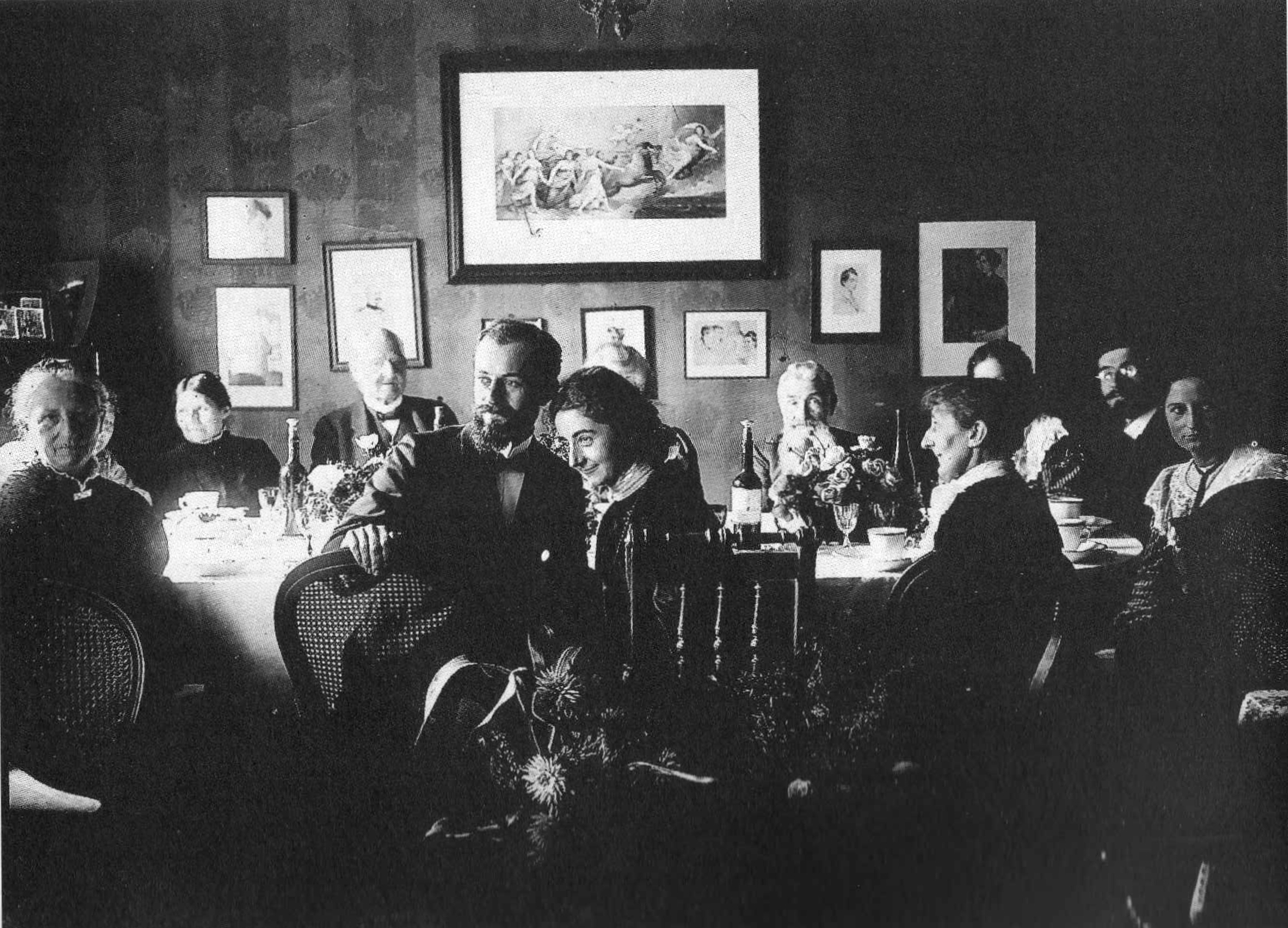
- Ranke at his wedding with Marie Stein in 1906
- Born: August 5, 1878; Balgheim (Möttingen), Germany
- Died: April 22, 1953; Freiburg, Germany
- Education: Ludwig-Maximilians-Universität München
- Occupation: Egyptologist
- Spouse: Marie Stein
- Parent: Leopold Friedrich Ranke (father) Julie née von Bever (mother)

Heinrich Johannes Hermann Ranke (August 5, 1878 – April 22, 1953) was a German Egyptologist who worked at Heidelberg University. He was forced to leave during the Nazi regime as his wife had Jewish ancestors. He worked during period at the University of Pennsylvania, in the US.

Ranke was born in Balgheim (Möttingen) to Leopold Friedrich Ranke and his second wife Julie née von Bever (1850–1924). He grew up and studied in Lübeck where his father was a Lutheran pastor. He initially studied theology at the University of Göttingen and the University of Greifswald from 1897, but on joining the Ludwig-Maximilians-Universität München in 1899, he studied oriental languages and Egyptology. After a doctorate in 1902 with studies on the Hammurabi dynasty and the formation of semitic names, he went to the University of Pennsylvania. He returned to Germany in 1905 and worked at the Egyptian department of the Museum in Berlin with Alan H. Gardiner. He became a teacher of Egyptology at Heidelberg University in 1910 and took part in several expeditions to Egypt for excavations including the one wherein the bust of Queen Nefertiti was found. During World War I, he served in the 4th Infantry Battalion to protect Lorraine. In 1932, he taught at the University of Wisconsin-Madison.

Ranke married Marie Stein in 1906, who was half Jewish and when Nazi rules were applied in 1937 he resigned and moved to the US where he taught at various universities and held a position as Professor of Egyptology at the University of Pennsylvania in 1938. He was also expelled from the Heidelberg Academy of Sciences in 1939. He returned in 1942 to Europe, spending time in Sweden and moved to Germany in 1945, taking an emeritus position in Egyptology at Heidelberg University. He published several books including a translation of James H. Breasted's History of Egypt in 1911. On 22 April 1953, he died in Freiburg im Breisgau.
