= Lanoe =

Lanoe or Lanoë may refer to:

- Lanoe Hawker (1890–1916), the first British First World War flying ace and a Victoria Cross recipient
- Lanoe Falconer, pseudonym of English writer Mary Elizabeth Hawker (1848–1908)
- Annick Lanoë (born 1948), French film director, screenwriter and author
- J. Jiquel Lanoe (1875–1948), French actor
- Talisa Lanoe (born 1994), Kenyan swimmer

== See also ==
- Guillemette Andreu-Lanoë (born 1948), French Egyptologist and archaeologist
