= Tomb of Akhethetep =

Tomb complex in Saqqarah, Egypt

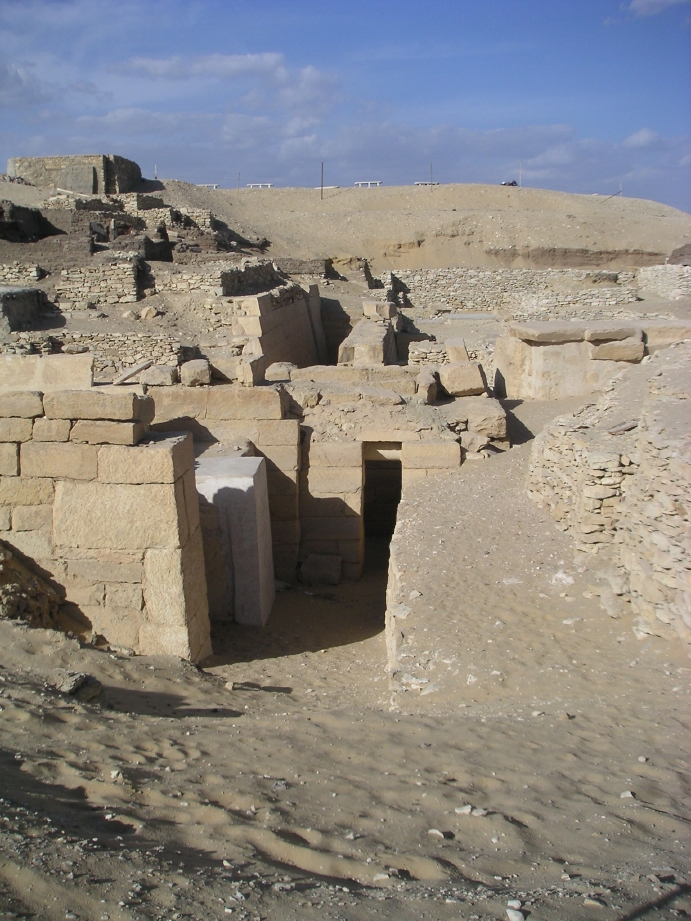
- The tomb in 2004; Burial site of Akhethetep
- Interactive map of Tomb of Akhethetep
- 29°52′16.32″N 31°12′58.68″E
- Type: Mastaba
- Location: Badrshein, Giza, Egypt

Site notes
- Material: Limestone
- Height: c. 16.4 meters (original); 5.92 meters
- Length: c. 32 meters (original)
- Width: c. 16.1 meters (original)
- Discovered: 28 March 1903

The Tomb of Akhethetep, also known as Mastaba of Akhethetep (French: Mastaba d'Akhethétep), is a tomb complex in Saqqara, Egypt. It was built for Akhethetep, a royal official, near the western part of the Pyramid of Djoser. Akhethetep was an official with several, mainly religious titles, including priest of Heka, priest of Khnum and priest of Horus. The tomb's decorated chapel was removed in 1903 and reassembled at the Louvre in Paris, where it is also known as the "Mastaba of Akhethetep" or simply "le mastaba du Louvre".

== History ==
The tomb was discovered on 28 March 1903 by a team of Georges Aaron Bénédite, Curator of the Louvre's Egyptian Department, Hilda Petrie, and Margaret Murray. In line with Egypt's policy at the time, the Louvre was allowed to buy the entire chapel, and relocate and reassemble it to Paris.

The chapel was initially displayed in 1905 in the ground floor of the aile des Sessions in the Denon (South) Wing of the Louvre Palace, which the museum had recently taken over from non-museum users. It was then moved in 1934–35 to its current location in the Sully (East) Wing. It was entirely disassembled in 2019, reassembled and reopened on 24 June 2021.

== Description ==
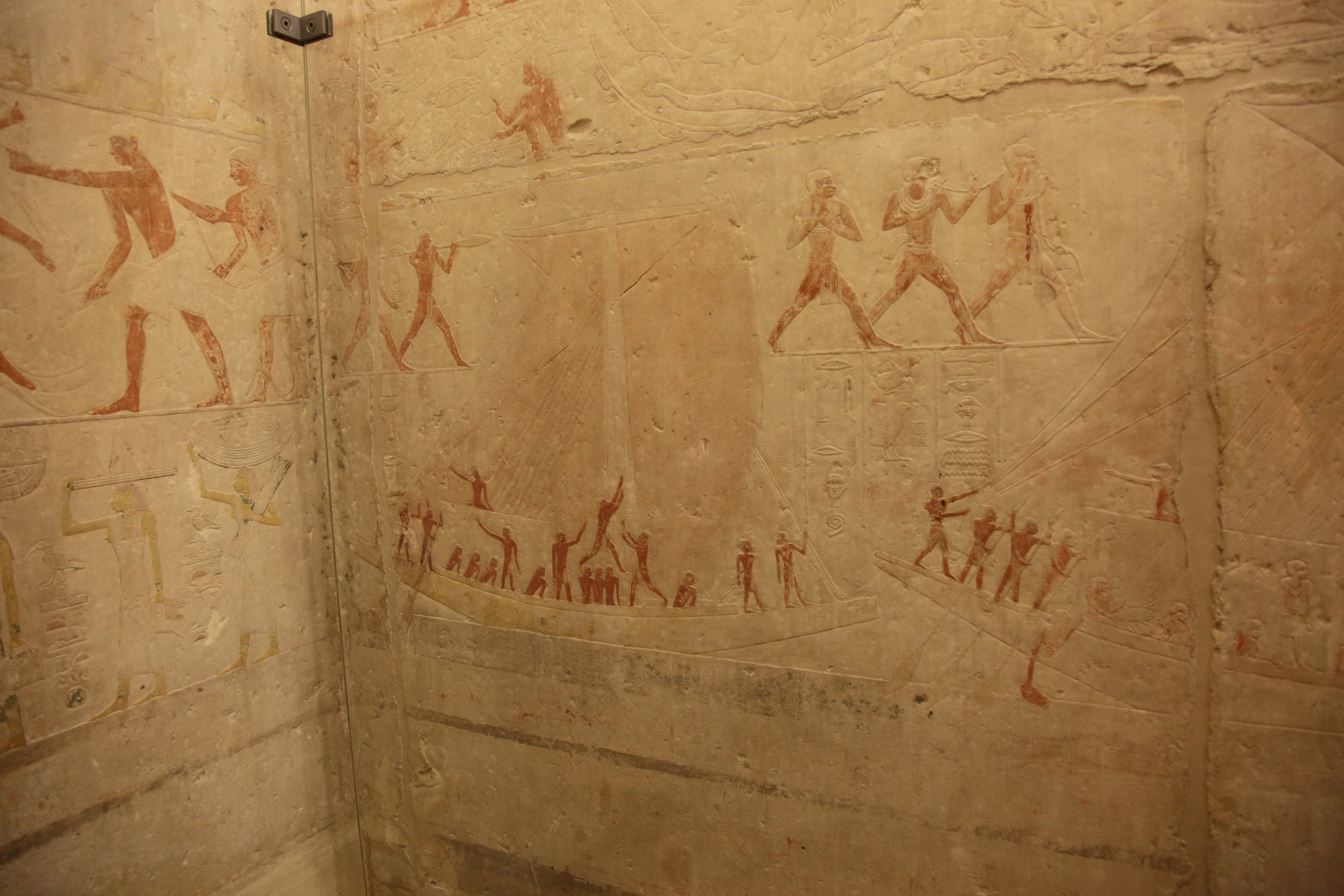
Decoration of the tomb's chapel, now at the Louvre

Archaeologists, notably Christiane Ziegler, Jean-Pierre Adam and Guillemette Andreu-Lanoë, have identified over eight years (1991-1999) that the tomb was 32 metres (105 ft) long, 16.1 metres (53 ft) in width, respectively about 60 and 30 Egyptian cubits, 5.92 metres (19.4 ft) high present; the initial height can be estimated at 6.4 metres (21 ft).

The mastaba is accessed through a narrow gate topped by a scroll on which is inscribed the name of the owner. The doorway is decorated in relief with a noteworthy scene of Akhethotep transporting statues to the tomb. The interior forms a small rectangular room whose left wall is pierced by a day that was formerly the tomb which contained the statues of the deceased. Akhethotep's body was buried in a subterranean vault at the end of a shaft. Excavations of the limestone chapel above it have found items which were used in offerings to Akhethotep, from offering tables and statues and the remains of the sacrament funeral in the crypt among which include a canopic jar with a limestone cover plate. It is highly decorated with bas reliefs, illustrating much about the life of Akhethetep on his country estate and feasts with live entertainment. The visitors would come to offer food and drink to his spirit, and recite texts to him, which would provide him with a flourishing afterlife. Among the noteworthy statues found in the vicinity of the chapel of the mastaba, is that of a man standing, probably Akhethotep, wearing a priestly garb wearing a panther skin and the insignia of the goddess Bat. It was also determined that the mastaba was plundered in antiquity and many subsequent burials took place until the Late Period.

A subterranean vault at the end of a shaft contained Akhethotep's body. However, the chapel above the tomb was accessible. The west wall with a carved false door, was considered a symbolic representation of a gateway between the land of the living and the dead.

The back wall is occupied by two high false door stelae mimicking the facade of the royal palace. The set was painted in bright colors that imitate wood and fabrics adorning the double door. Other walls show classic domestic scenes of life in 2400 BC, such as farm work, hunting in the marshes (including hippopotamus and fish, or the funeral of Akhethotep, meals and festivities and metaphorical images of boating down a river which allude both to his journeys in real life, and to his voyage on the waters of the dead which were to accompany him forever, on the serdab wall.

During refurbishments at the Louvre in 1985, it was analysed further and restored. The analysis helped to highlight the technical characteristics that distinguish the wall of the false door from the other three walls. The wall of the false door is mainly composed of large slabs of stone, regular shape and symmetrical, surmounted by a series of smaller blocks. The other walls are conceptually different, the blocks are irregular, the most massive stones are placed on the ground, as bedrock.

== Gallery ==
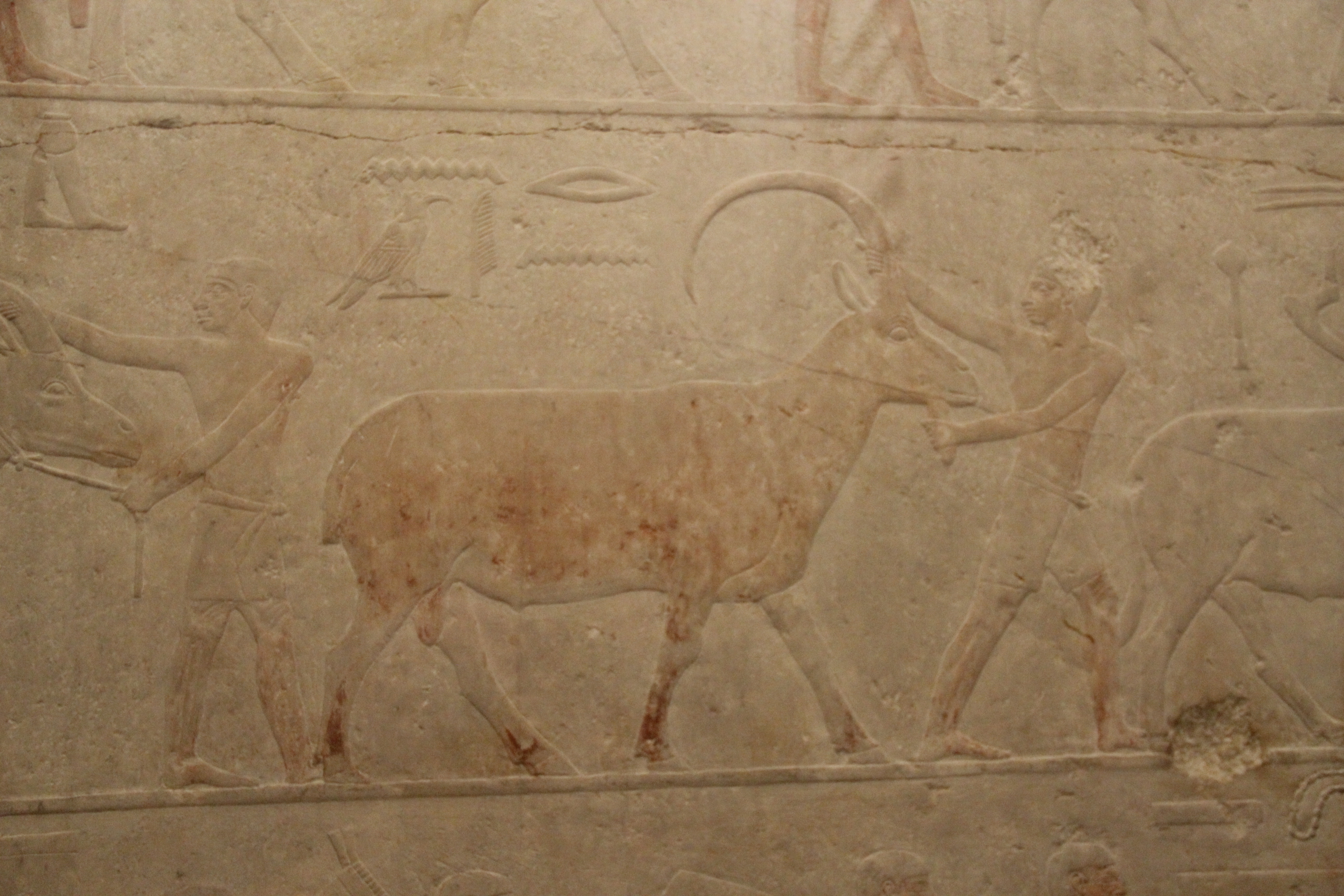
Reliefs of wildlife offerings from Akhethetep's chapel tomb

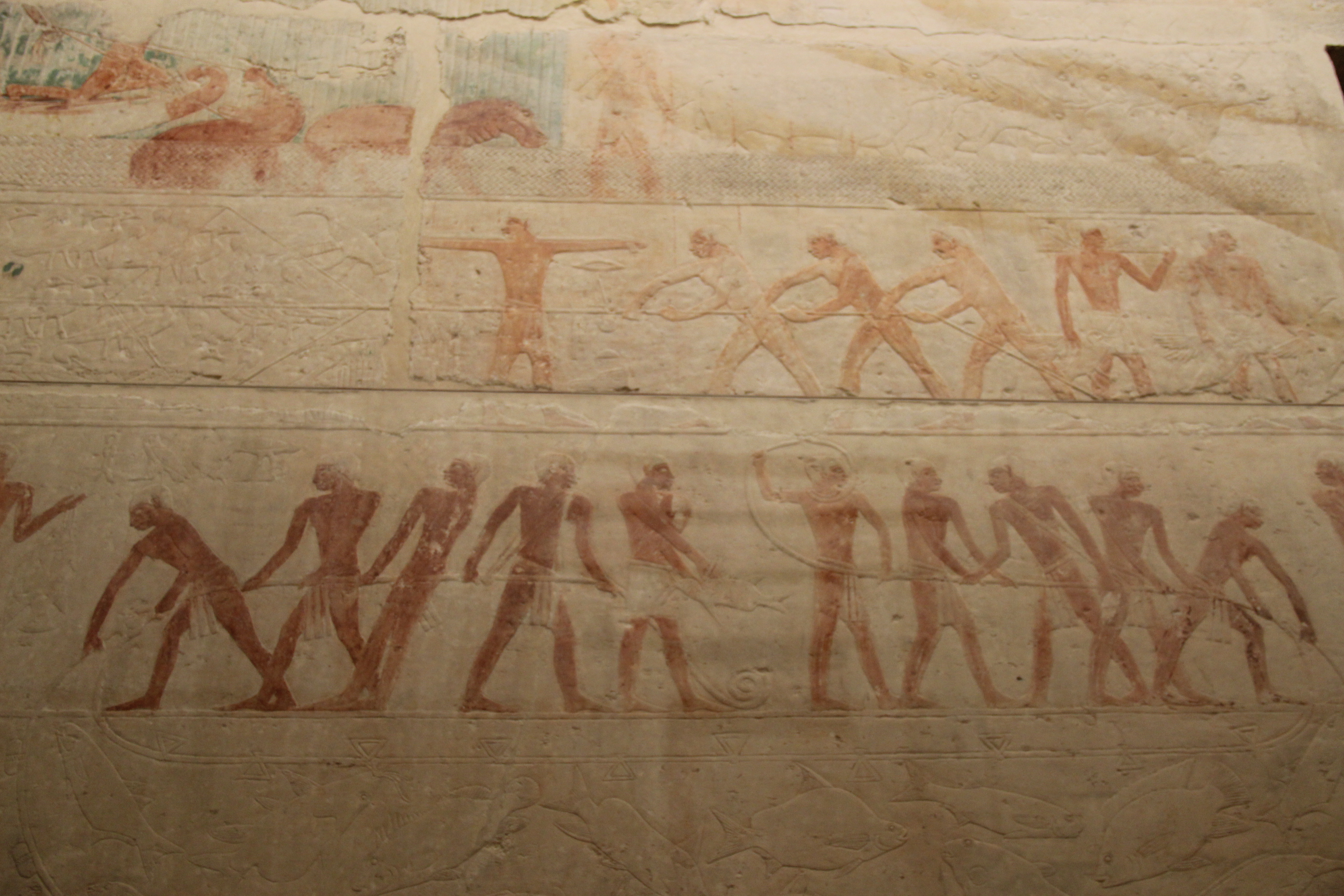
Bas reliefs from Akhethetep's chapel tomb

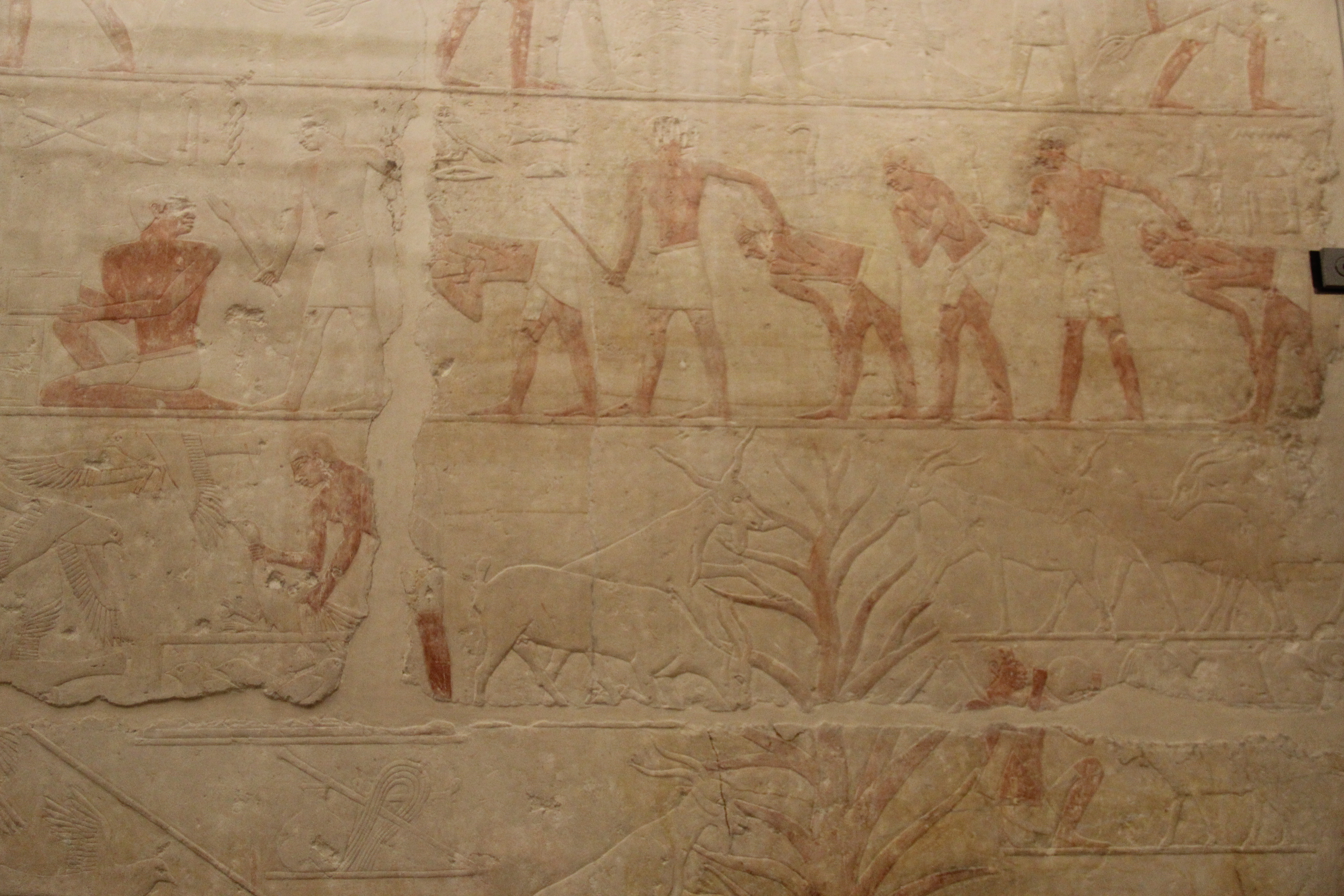
Bas reliefs from Akhethetep's chapel tomb

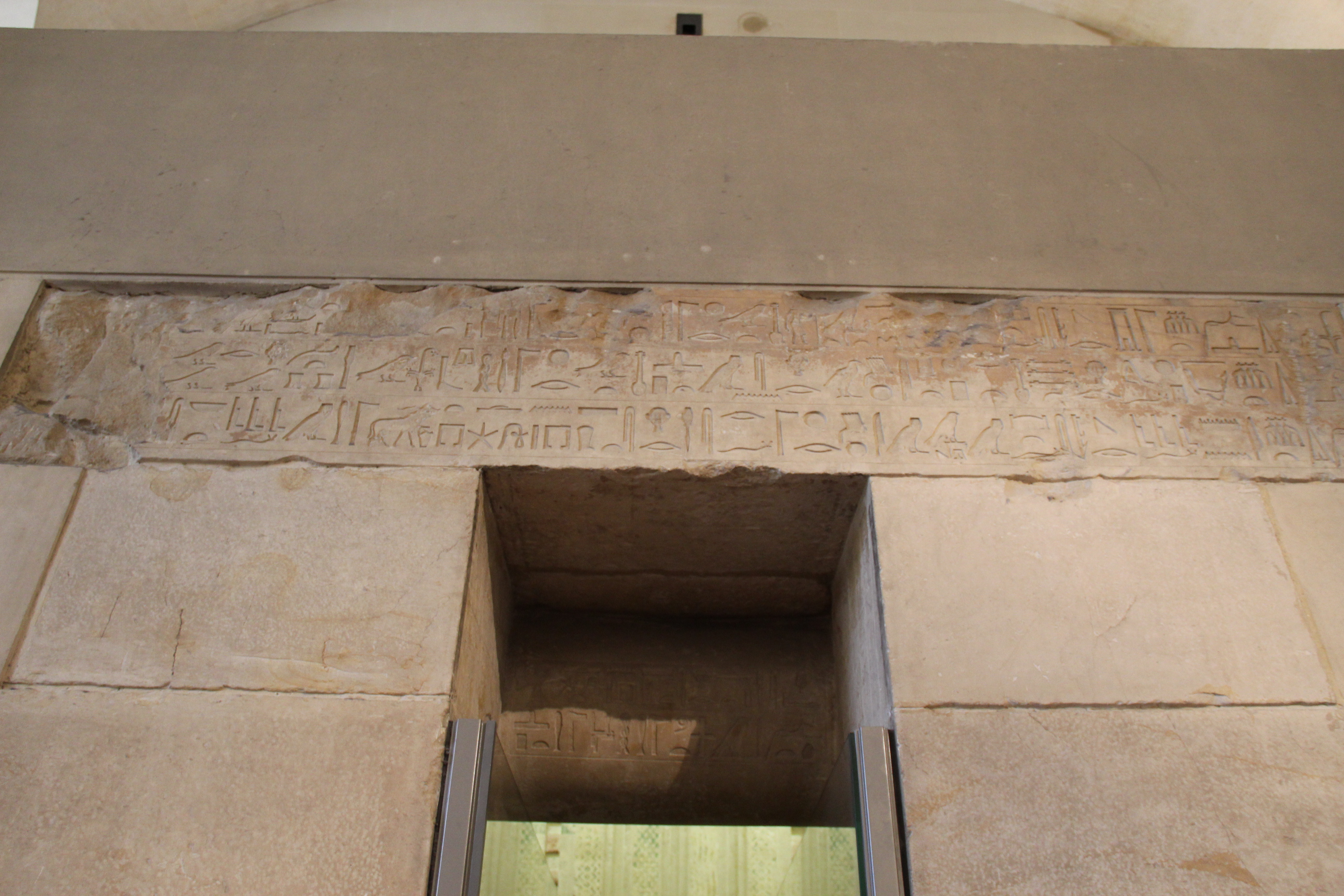
Limestone Bas reliefs on an architrave from Akhethetep's chapel tomb in the Louvre

== Bibliography ==
- Ziegler, Christiane; Adam, Jean-Pierre; Andreu-Lanoë, Guillemette (June 2007). Le mastaba d'Akhethetep. Peeters Publishers. ISBN 978-90-429-1922-8.
- Bertha Poter, Rosalind L.B. Mossː Topographical Bibliography of Ancient Egyptian Hieroglyphic Texts, Reliefs and Paintings. (2nd edition) Volume III. Memphis. Part 2. Saqqara to Dahshur. (1981) page 634-637 online
