= Christiane Ziegler =

French egyptologist

Christiane Ziegler (born 3 May 1942 in L'Isle-sur-la-Sorgue), is a French Egyptologist, curator, director emeritus of the Department of Egyptian Antiquities of the Louvre Museum and editorial director of the archaeological mission from the Louvre Museum at Saqqara, Egypt.

== Early years ==
Ziegler was a student at the Institut de Science Politique. Studying under the direction of Professor Nicolas Grimal, she is a graduate of Paris-Sorbonne University. She began studying Egyptology with a thesis on the Queen Tiye, wife of Amenhotep III. Ziegler's internship was at the Louvre's Department of Oriental Antiquities.

== Career ==
Ziegler started her career as a high school teacher. She began working at the Louvre in 1972 and her archaeological research at Saqqara began in 1991. She is the author of numerous important scientific articles and books about Egyptology. She has also authored translations of ancient letters from Egypt and Nubia as well as several books on History of Egyptian Art.

"No place, no kingdom of the past fascinates as ancient Egypt. Along the Nile, in the course of millennia, it has developed a culture and an extraordinarily rich monumental art, able to dominate much of the known land. The apex of the rigid hierarchy and religious state of that empire was the pharaoh, whose exploits have been exalted over all Egyptian history to improve the eternal image of a being outside of the ordinary, or beloved of the gods." (C. Ziegler, "Pharaohs", Venice exhibition catalog, 9 September 2002 – 25 May 2003)

—

In particular, she has studied the monuments of the time of the pyramids of Ancient Egypt (hieroglyphic inscriptions, statues, paintings and reliefs of the tombs), the various components of the site of Saqqara, metal arts from the Pharaonic period (bronze and silver) and has written a monograph devoted to Queen Tiye, wife of Amenhotep III. A long-time Egyptian archaeology professor at the Ecole du Louvre, Christiane Ziegler also co-directs the department of Egyptian Archaeology.

Since 1991, she has headed the archaeological mission from the Louvre Museum at Saqqara on the "North of the Unas Causeway" under the Supreme Council of Antiquities. In 1993, she was named chief curator of the Louvre's Department of Antiquities. During the period 1994–2004, she was director of the Research Unit Louvre, whose work focuses on the Theban region. While her mission's initial purpose was to locate the mastaba of Akhethetep, it also located two other Old Kingdom mastabas, many burials dating to the Twenty-sixth through Thirtieth dynasties, as well as Coptic settlements. During which time she excavated and wrote a book on the Tomb of Akhethetep, paying particular attention to its reliefs. A team led by Ziegler was responsible for finding hundreds of mummies in an underground maze of caves, most likely an ancient multifamily cemetery, crammed into shafts and corridors at Saqqara.

Ziegler has curated major exhibitions, notably "Origins of Writing" (Grand Palais, 1982) "Tanis, the gold of the Pharaohs" (Paris-Grand Palais Edinburgh, 1987–1988), "Memoirs of Egypt" (Paris-Berlin, 1990), "Egyptomania" (Paris, Ottawa and Vienna, 1994–1996), and "Egyptian Art in the Age of the Pyramids" (Paris-New York-Toronto, 1999–2000). For her exhibition "The Pharaohs" (Venice-Paris-Madrid-Bahrain-Valencia, 2002–2007), Ziegler curated 300 masterpieces of ancient Egypt, brought together for the first time, to be viewed from two perspectives; on the one hand being powerful, monumental images, as they are best known, and, secondly, as the human person who recognized himself as a divine intermediary. The display in the National Museum of Bahrain, which featured 120 objects, was designed by Cairo-based architect Agnieszka Dobrowolska. According to Ziegler, the 2008 "Queens of Egypt" (July–September 2008, Grimaldi Forum, Monaco) exhibition is the first to be devoted entirely to Egypt's queens while also being unique in the number and quality of the assembled pieces from some of the world's greatest museums. She is preparing an international exhibition at the site of Saqqara, planned for 2011–2012.

Ziegler is a member of numerous learned societies. These include the International Committee of UNESCO for the new museums in Aswan and Cairo, the Scientific Council of the Institut Français d'Archéologie Orientale, the commission on excavations of the Department of Foreign Affairs of the German Archaeological Institute, and Vice President of Friends of Museums in Egypt. She sits on the scientific board of Agence France-Muséums in charge of the program Louvre Abu Dhabi, and participates on the board of the National Museum of History and Art.

== Awards ==
Ziegler is a recipient of the Gaston Maspero Lifetime Achievement Award awarded by the Académie des Inscriptions et Belles-Lettres. She is a 2008 recipient of the prestigious Légion d'honneur and Commandeur de l'Ordre national du Mérite awards.

== Selected publications ==
- With Hervé Champollion et Diane Harlé, L'Égypte de Jean-François Champollion – Lettres et journaux de voyage aux éditions Jean Paul Mengès – 1989
- With Christophe Barbotin et Marie-Hélène Rutschowscaya, Le Louvre : les antiquités égyptiennes, Le Louvre aux éditions Scala – 1990
- Le mastaba d'Akhethetep : Une chapelle funéraire de l'Ancien Empire, aux éditions de la Réunion des Musées Nationaux – 1993
- With Jean-Marcel Humbert et Michael Pantazzi, Égyptomania : L'Égypte dans l'art occidental, 1730–1930, aux éditions Réunion des Musées Nationaux – 1994
- With Guillemette Andreu, Marie-Hélène Rutschowscaya, L'Égypte ancienne au Louvre, aux éditions Hachette Littérature – 1997
- La mission archéologique du Louvre à Saqqara. Dernières découvertes dans Comptes-rendus de l'Académie des Inscriptions et Belles-Lettres – 1997
- Les statues égyptiennes de l'Ancien Empire, dans la collection des Catalogues du Louvre aux éditions Réunion des Musées Nationaux – 1997
- L'art de l'Ancien Empire égyptien : Actes du colloque organisé au musée du Louvre par le Service culturel les 3 et 4 avril 1998, aux éditions La Documentation Française – 1999
- With Jean-Pierre Adam, Les pyramides d'Égypte, aux éditions Hachette Littérature – 1999
- With Jean-Luc Bovot, Art et archéologie : L'Égypte ancienne, dans la collection Manuel du Louvre aux éditions Réunion des Musées Nationaux – 2001
- Les Pharaons, aux éditions Flammarion – 2002
- Le Scribe "accroupi", aux éditions Réunion des Musées Nationaux – 2002
- With Annie Gasse, Les stèles d'Horus sur les crocodiles, aux éditions Réunion des Musées Nationaux – 2004
- With Jean-Luc Bovot, L'art égyptien aux éditions Larousse – 2004
- Pharaon, aux éditions Flammarion – 2004
- With Hervé Champollion, L'Égypte : Lettres et journaux du voyage (1828–1829) par Jean-François Champollion, aux éditions de Lodi – 2005
- Le Mastaba d'Akhethetep. Fouilles du Louvre à Saqqara volume I – Peeters – Louvain (Belgique) – mars 2007
- Saqqara – Les Tombeaux de Basse Époque – Peeters – Louvain (Belgique) – prévu pour 2008
