= Georges Aaron Bénédite =

French Egyptologist

Georges Aaron Bénédite (10 August 1857 – 26 March 1926) was a French Egyptologist and curator at the Louvre.

He was born at Nîmes, the son of Samuel Bénédite and Isabelle Bénédite born Lisbonne, whose second husband Georges Lafenestre was a noted poet, art critic and curator of the Louvre, who helped raise the young Georges Aaron. Georges Aaron himself became a curator at the Louvre in the Department of Egyptology in 1907.

Bénédite is noted for his discovery of the Tomb of Akhethetep at Saqqara on 28 March 1903. The chapel of Akhethotep was purchased by the Louvre, in line with Egyptian policy at the time, and relocated to Paris under Bénédite's supervision. Bénédite also excavated several tombs in the Valley of the Kings, such as KV41 in 1900. He is one of the first to propose the existence of theater in ancient Egypt.

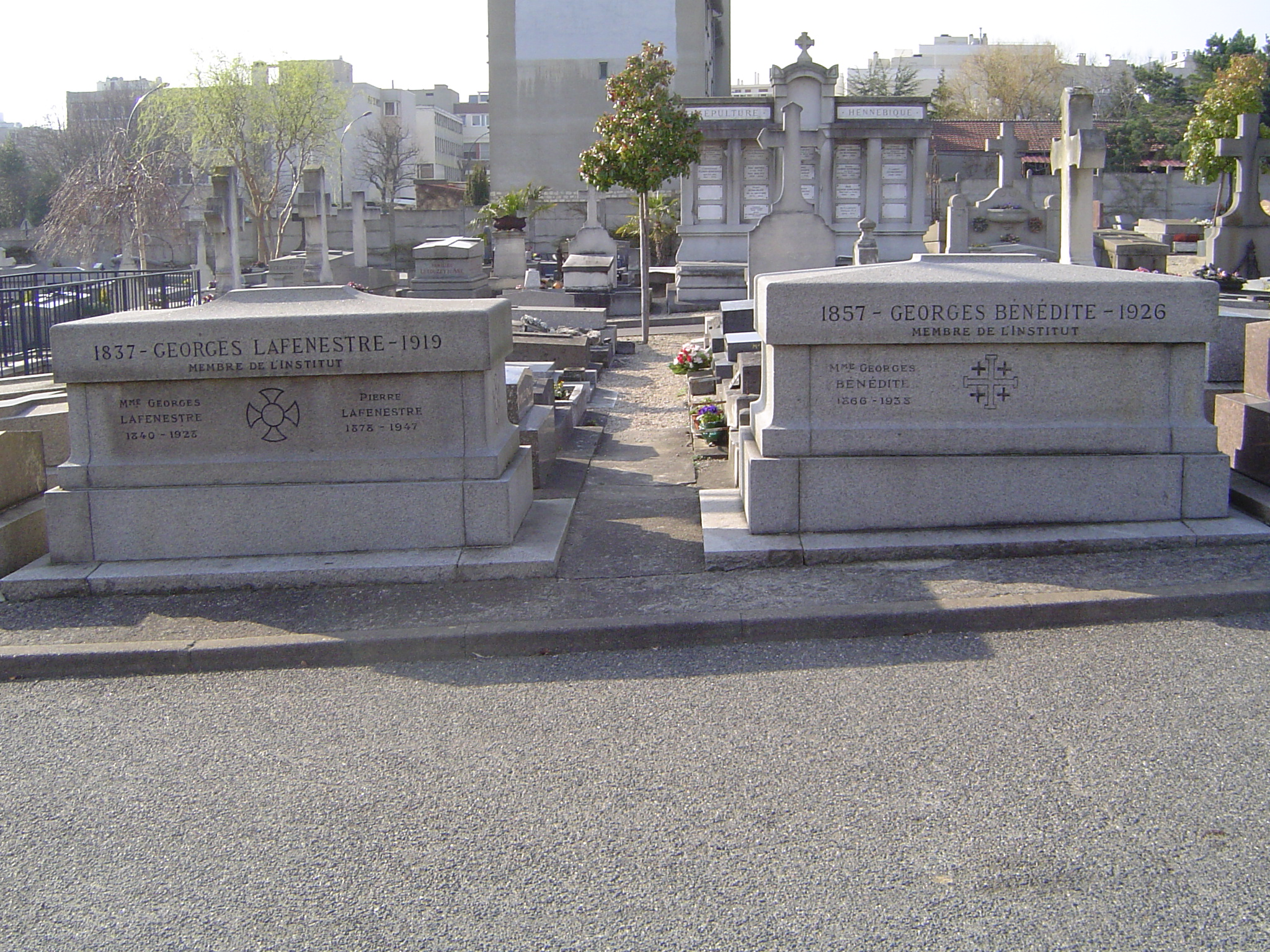
The tombs of Georges Aaron Bénédite and Georges Lafenestre (French poet) in the cemetery of Bourg-la-Reine.

Bénédite is also known for his purchasing of the Gebel el-Arak Knife for the Louvre from a private antique dealer Maurice Nahman in Cairo in February 1914. Bénédite immediately recognized the extraordinary state of preservation of the artefact as well as his archaic datation. On 16 March 1914, he writes to Charles Boreux, then head of the département des Antiquités égyptiennes of the Louvre about the knife an unsuspecting antique dealer presented him:

[...] an archaic flint knife with an ivory handle of the greatest beauty. This is the masterpiece of predynastic sculpture [...] executed with remarkable finesse and elegance. This is a work of great detail [...] and the interest of what is represented is even beyond the artistic value of the artefact. On one side is a hunting scene; on the other a scene of war or raid. At the top of the hunting scene [...] the hunter wears a large Chaldean garment: the head is covered by a hat like our Gudea [...] and he grasps two lions standing against him. You can judge the importance of this asiatic representation [...] we will own one of the most important prehistoric monuments, if not more. It is, in definitive, in tangible and resumed form, the first chapter of the history of Egypt.

Bénédite died in Luxor, Egypt, shortly after visiting the tomb of Tutankhamun, further adding to the legend of the curse of the pharaoh. His body was brought back to France and was buried in the family vault in the cemetery of Bourg-la-Reine in the Hauts-de-Seine.

== Publications ==
- Le temple de Philae. In: Mémoires publiés par les membres de la Mission archéologique française au Caire. Band 13, Faszikel 1 and Faszikel 2, Ernest Leroux, Paris 1893 (Georges Aaron Bénédite at the Internet Archive, Georges Aaron Bénédite at the Internet Archive).
- Le tombeau de la reine Thiti. In: Mémoires publiés par les membres de la Mission archéologique française au Caire. Band 5, Faszikel 3, Ernest Leroux, Paris 1894, p. 381–412 (Georges Aaron Bénédite at the Internet Archive).
- Le tombeau de Néferhorpou, fils d’Amenemanît. In: Mémoires publiés par les membres de la Mission archéologique française au Caire. Band 5, Faszikel 3, Ernest Leroux, Paris 1894, p. 489–540 (Georges Aaron Bénédite at the Internet Archive).
- Égypte (= Collection des guides-Joanne). Hachette, Paris 1900 (in three volumes, comprises 7 maps, 104 plans, 54 illustrations and 22 synoptic tables).
- À propos d’un buste égyptien récemment acquis par le Musée du Louvre. In: Monuments et mémoires de la Fondation Eugène Piot. 1906, p. 5–28 (persee.fr).
- Catalogue général des antiquités égyptiennes du Musée du Caire. Miroirs. Kairo 1907 (Georges Aaron Bénédite at the Internet Archive)
- with Max Herz-bey: Le Caire et ses environs (= Collection des guides-Joanne). Hachette, Paris 1909.
- Catalogue général des antiquités égyptiennes du Musée du Caire. Objets de toilette. Iére partie. Peignes etc. Kairo 1911 (gallica.bnd.fr).
- Amon et Toutânkhamon (au sujet d'un groupe acquis par le musée égyptien du Louvre). In: Monuments et mémoires de la Fondation Eugène Piot. 24, 1920, p. 47–68 (persee.fr).
- L’art égyptien dans ses lignes génerales. Morancé, Paris 1923.

== Bibliography ==
- Jean-Baptiste Chabot: Éloge funèbre de M. Georges Bénédite. In: Comptes rendus de l’Académie des inscriptions et belles-lettres. 1926, p. 63–66 (persee.fr).
- Charles Boreaux: Georges Bénédite (1857–1926). In: Revue de l’Égypte ancienne. 1, 1927, p. 250–278 (ub.uni-heidelberg.de).
- Morris L. Bierbrier: Who was who in Egyptology. 4th revised edition. Egypt Exploration Society, London 2012, ISBN 978-0-85698-207-1, p. 53–54.
