= Akhethetep (Louvre mastaba) =

Saqqara mastaba of the Old Kingdom official Akhethetep

- priest of Heka priest of Khnum priest of Horus
- Tenure: c. 2350 BC
- Burial: Tomb of Akhethetep, Giza, Egypt
- Children: Seankhuptah, Rekhuef, and Akhethetep

Akhethetep (fl. c. 2350 BC) was an ancient Egyptian official of the Old Kingdom, perhaps dating to the end of the Fifth or the beginning of the Sixth Dynasty. He is mainly known from his mastaba that was found at Saqqara. Many decorated parts were brought to the Louvre.

The mastaba of Akhethetep is inscribed with many religious titles, including priest of Heka, priest of Khnum, and priest of Horus. He was also sole friend and leader of the two thrones.

From the inscriptions in his tomb, it is also possible to reconstruct his family. His wife is unknown, but he had at least three sons: Seankhuptah (I), Rekhuef (I) and Akhethetep (II). Rekhuef (I) is known from his own mastaba not far away from that of his father. Rekhuef (I) had a son, who was named Akhethetep (III), who is also known from his own mastaba. Akhethetep (III) had two sons: Rekhuef (II) and Pehernefer, both also known from their own mastabas.

== Bibliography ==
- Ziegler, Christiane; Adam, Jean-Pierre; Andreu-Lanoë, Guillemette (June 2007). Le mastaba d'Akhethetep. Peeters Publishers. ISBN 978-90-429-1922-8.
