= Gebel el-Arak Knife =

Ivory and flint knife dating from Egyptian prehistory

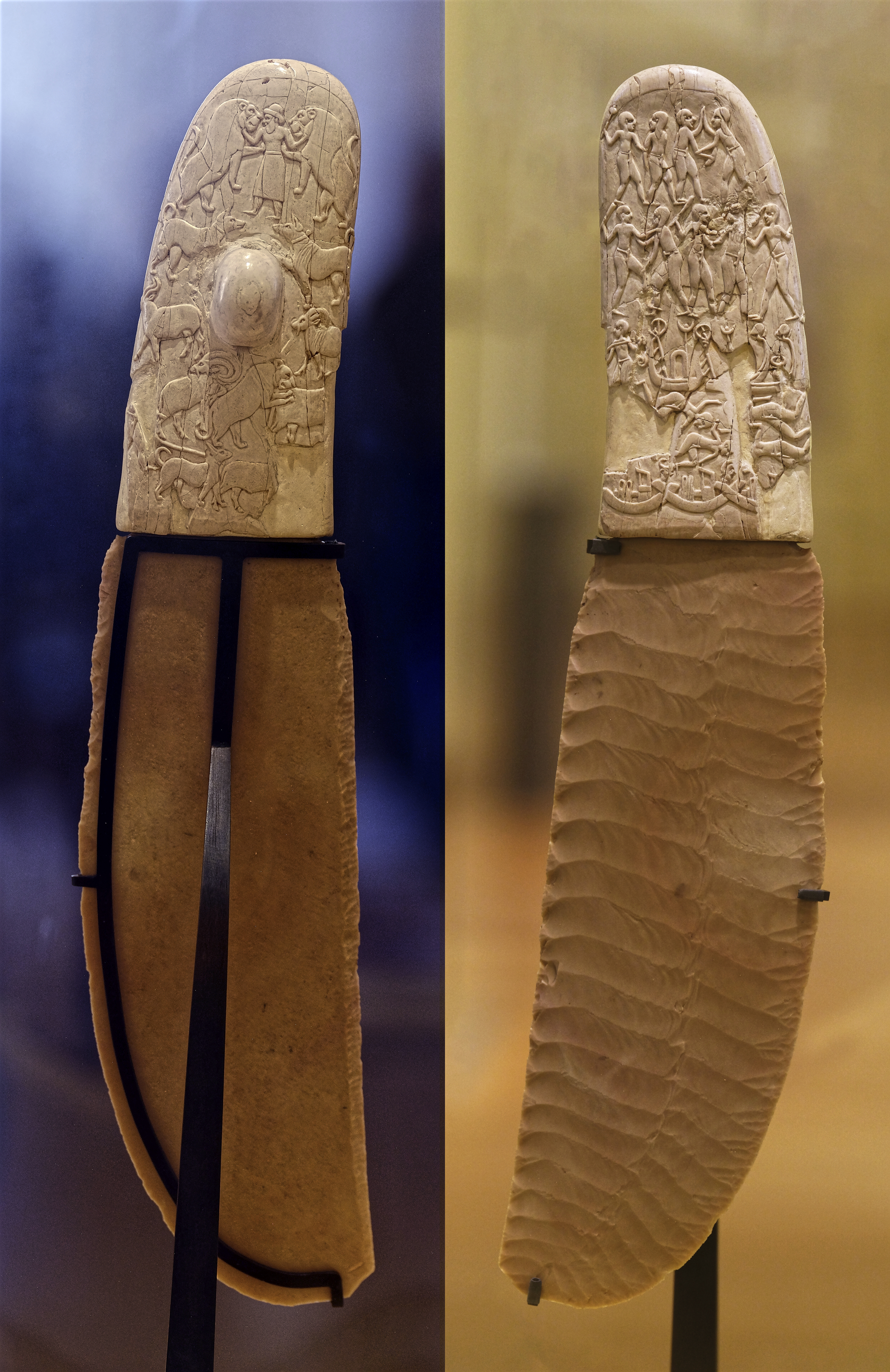
- The Gebel el-Arak knife (back and front), on display at the Musée du Louvre.
- Material: Elephant ivory, flint
- Size: 25.5 centimetres (10.0 in)
- Created: Naqada II d from c. 3450 BC
- Discovered: Bought by Georges Aaron Bénédite in Cairo from antique dealer M. Nahman, February 1914
- Present location: Musée du Louvre, Sully wing, room 633
- Identification: E 11517

The Gebel el-Arak Knife, also Jebel el-Arak Knife, is an ivory and flint knife dating from the end of the Naqada II period of Egyptian prehistory (c.3450–3400 BC), showing Mesopotamian influence. The knife was purchased in 1914 in Cairo by Georges Aaron Bénédite for the Louvre, where it is now on display in the Sully wing, room 633. At the time of its purchase, the knife handle was alleged by the seller to have been found at the site of Gebel el-Arak, but it is today believed to come from Abydos.

== Purchase and origin ==
=== Purchase ===
The Gebel el-Arak knife was bought for the Louvre by the philologist and Egyptologist Georges Aaron Bénédite in February 1914 from a private antique dealer, Maurice Nahman, in Cairo. Bénédite immediately recognised the artefact's extraordinary state of preservation as well as its archaic date. On 16 March 1914, he wrote to Charles Boreux, then head of the département des Antiquités égyptiennes of the Louvre, about the item the unsuspecting dealer had offered him. It was:

[...] an archaic flint knife with an ivory handle of the greatest beauty. This is the masterpiece of predynastic sculpture [...] executed with remarkable finesse and elegance. This is a work of great detail [...] and the interest of what is represented extends even beyond the artistic value of the artefact. On one side is a hunting scene; on the other a scene of war or a raid. At the top of the hunting scene [...] the hunter wears a large Chaldean garment: he head is covered by a hat like that of our Gudea [...] and he grasps two lions standing against him. You can judge the importance of this asiatic representation [...] we will own one of the most important prehistoric monuments, if not more. It is, in definitive, in tangible and summary form, the first chapter of the history of Egypt (emphasis in the original).

Mesopotamian king on the Gebel el-Arak knife

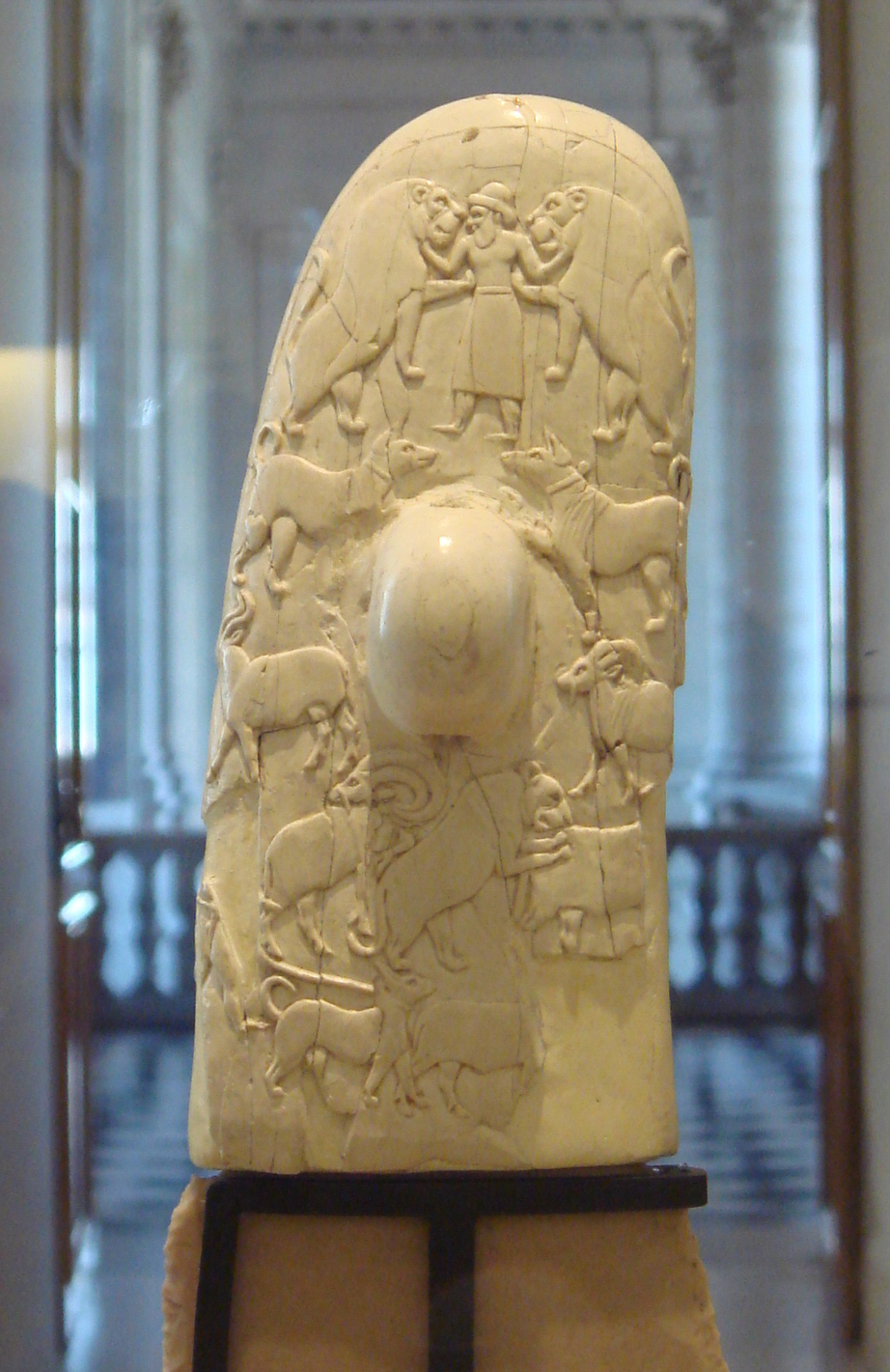
Gebel el-Arak Knife ivory handle (back), in the Departement of Pre-Dynastic Egyptian antiquities, Louvre Museum.

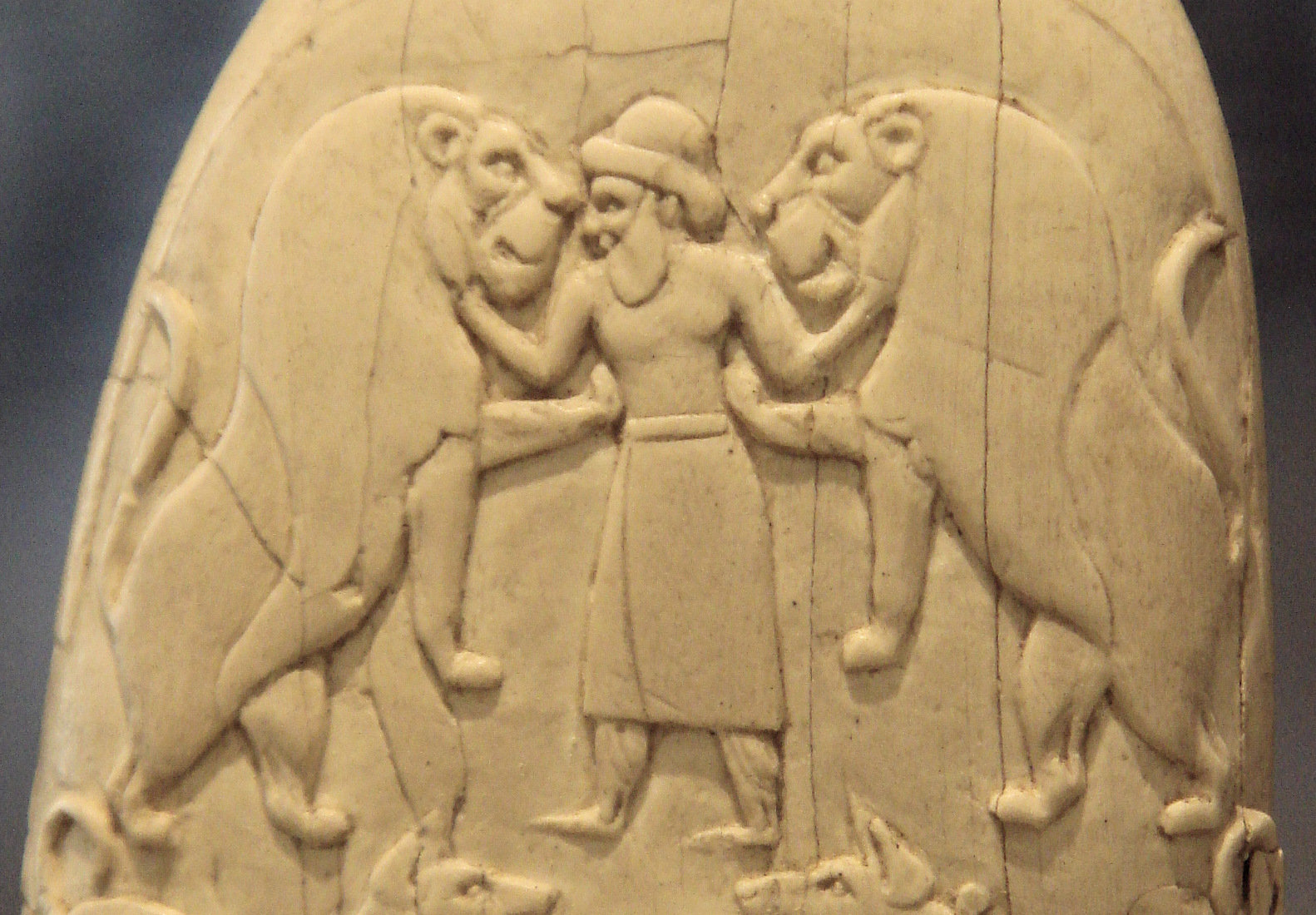
Mesopotamian king as Master of Animals on the Gebel el-Arak Knife at the top of the handle, dated circa 3300-3200 BC, Abydos, Egypt. This work of art both shows the influence of Mesopotamia on Egypt at an early date, in an example of ancient Egypt-Mesopotamia relations, and the state of Mesopotamian royal iconography during the Uruk period.

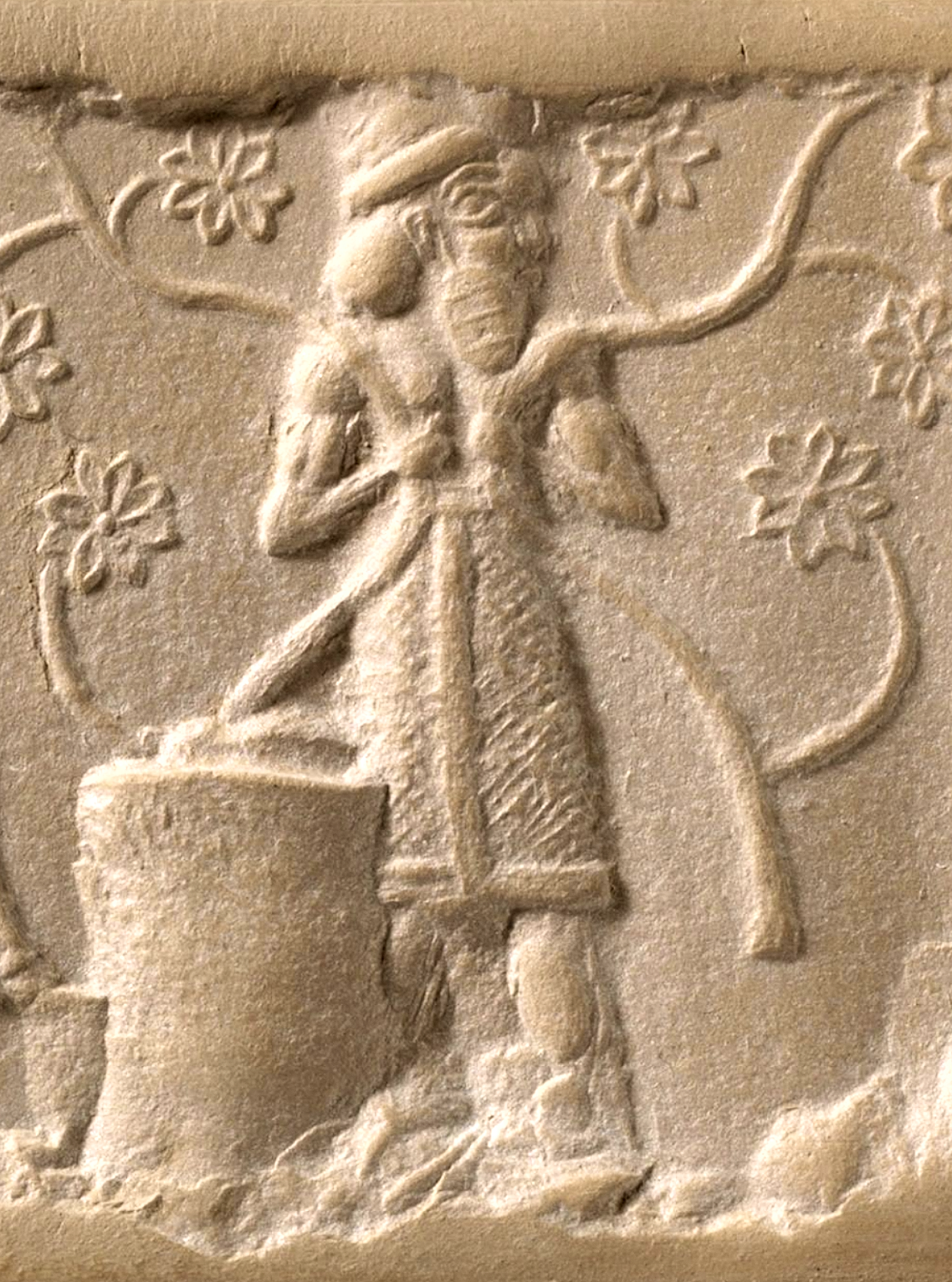
Similar portrait of an Uruk King-Priest with a brimmed round hat and large beard, bare-chested with a straight skirt. Uruk, 3300-3000 BC.

At the time of purchase, its blade and handle were separated, as the seller did not realise that they fitted together. Boreux later proposed that the knife be restored, and that the blade and handle be joined together. This was done in March 1933 by Léon André, who worked mainly on consolidating the ensemble, and conserving the ivory handle. The most recent restoration of the knife was undertaken in 1997 by Agnès Cascio and Juliette Lévy.

Of the discovery Gebel el-Arak Knife, the Egyptologist Flinders Petrie wrote: "This is to Egyptian history what the Bayeux Tapestry is to English history, a national monument of conquest". The knife was one of the main arguments in the elaboration of his Dynastic race theory.

=== Provenance ===
At the time of its purchase by Bénédite, the knife handle was said by the dealer to have been found at the site of Gebel el-Arak (جبل العركى), a plateau near the village of Nag Hammadi, 40 kilometres (25 mi) south of Abydos. However, the knife's true provenance is indicated by Bénédite in his letter to Boreux. He wrote:

[...] the seller did not suspect that the flint [blade] belonged with the handle and presented it to me as witness of the recent finds from Abydos.

That the knife did indeed originate from Abydos is supported by the otherwise total absence of archaeological finds from Gebel el-Arak, while intensive excavations by Émile Amélineau, Flinders Petrie, Édouard Naville and Thomas Eric Peet were taking place at this time at the Umm el-Qa'ab, the necropolis of predynastic and early dynastic rulers in Abydos.

== Description ==
=== Blade ===
The blade of the knife is made of homogenous finely grained yellowish chert, a variant of flint. Chert is widely available in Egypt and appears across the archaeological record as a material in lithic tool usage from the Paleolithic up to the New Kingdom. The blade was produced from the original stone in five stages:

- Roughing of the original stone.
- Preformation of the blade by percussion flaking.
- Polishing of both sides of the blade. This operation is required before the ripple-flaking, see below. One side of the blade was left polished and did not receive further work, thus showing a smooth ground surface, maybe to imitate a metal blade.
- Ripple-flaking on one side of the blade. This consists in uniformly removing long and thin strips of stone with parallel pressure flaking, creating a regular pattern of S undulations on the surface of the stone. Analysis of the shock waves on the surface of the blade reveals they were produced from the top to the bottom of the blade and from left to right, in a counterclockwise fashion. This work was probably made with pointed copper tools. The ripple-flaking of this side of the blade has no incidence on its sharpness, indicating that it may have served an artistic purpose.
- Fine serration of the edge of the blade by micro-flaking. This step produces the sharpness of the blade.
Details of the blade
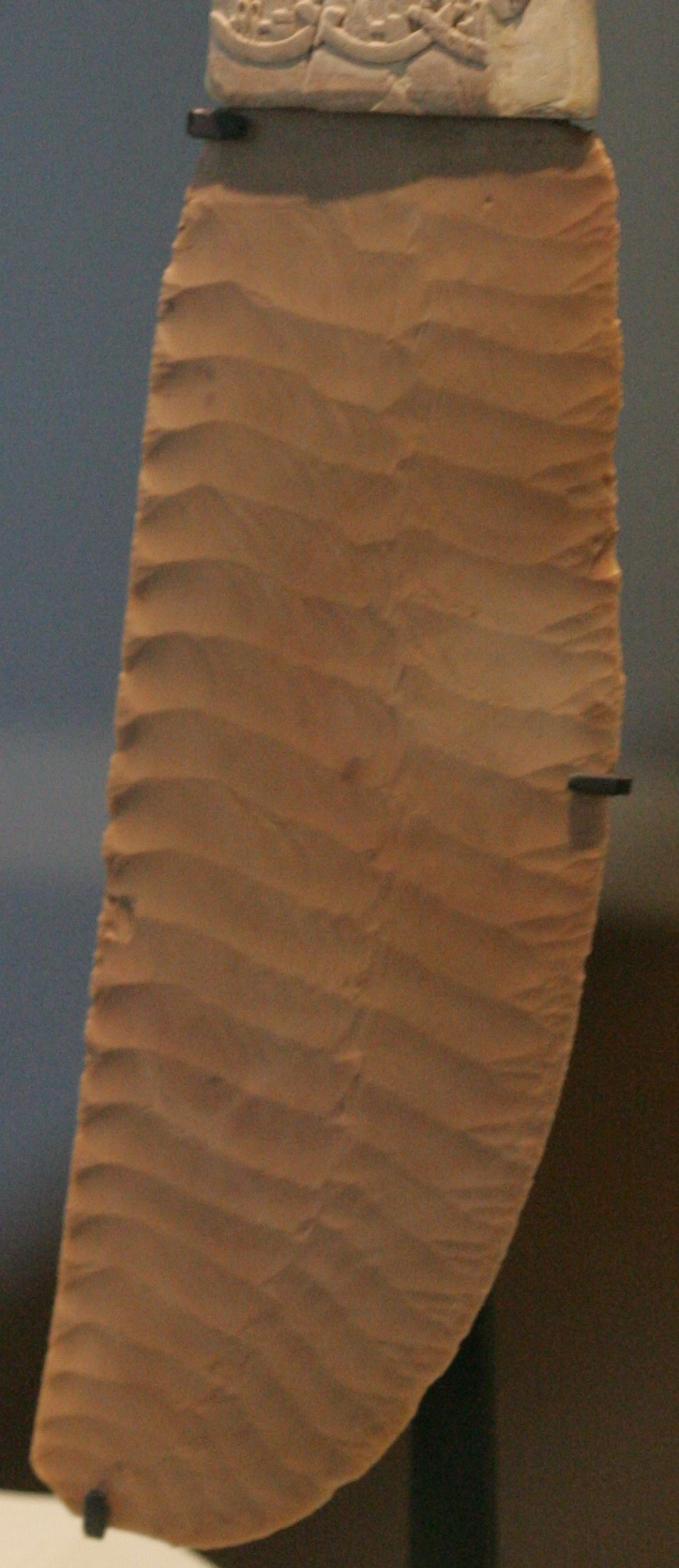
Gebel el-Arak knife, ripple-flaked side of the blade

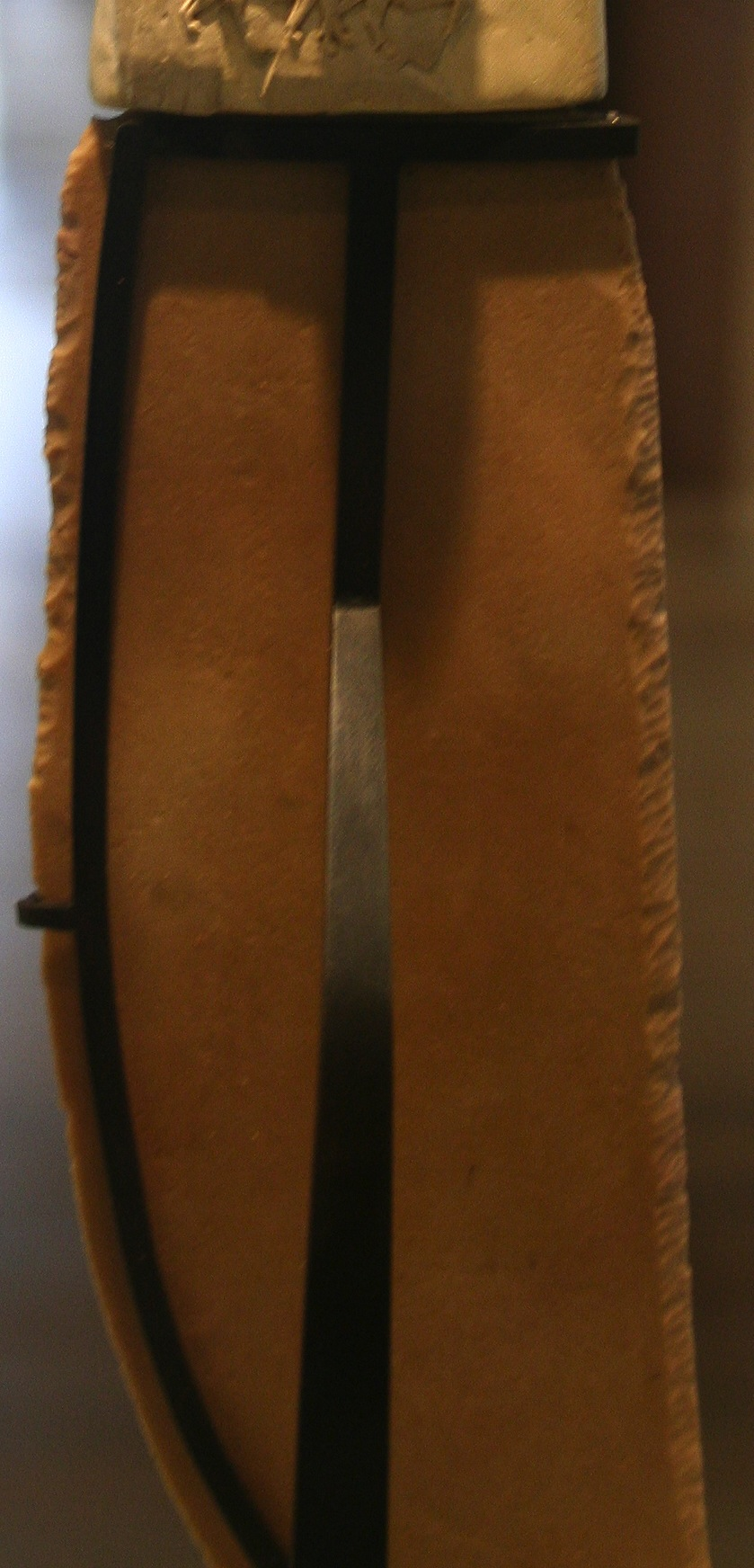
Gebel el-Arak knife, polished side of the blade

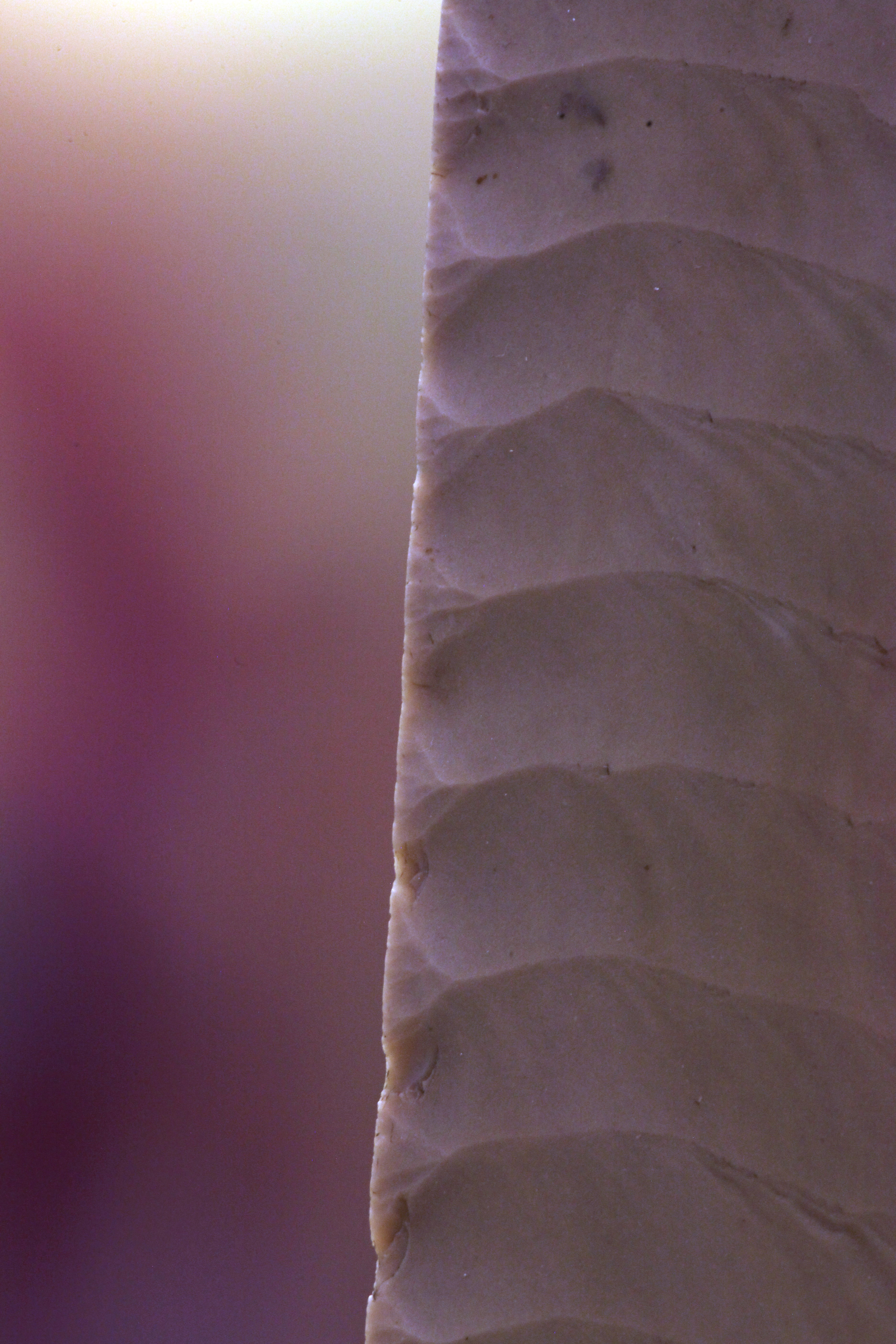
Detail of the serrations

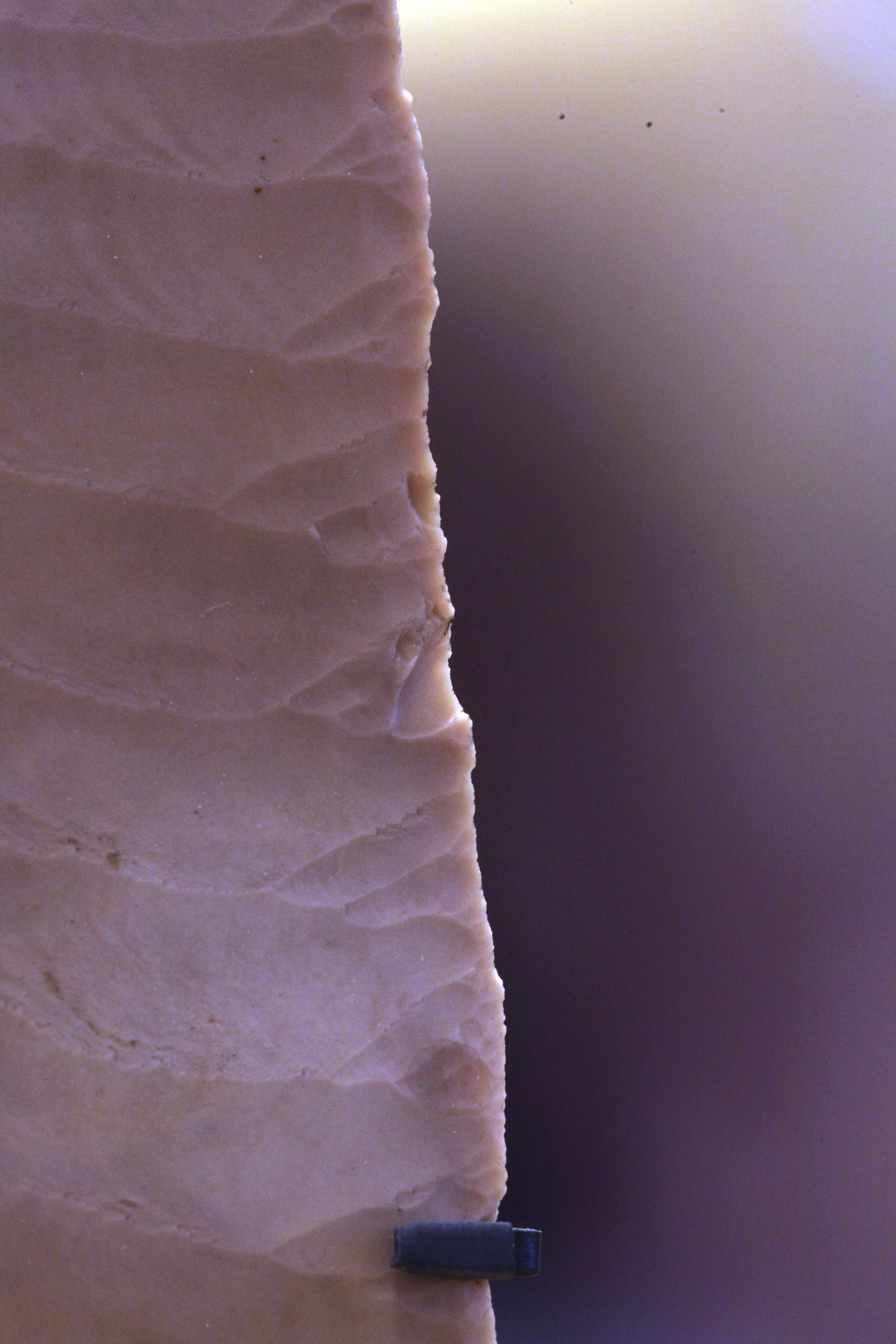
Detail of the serrations

The blade of the Gebel el-Arak knife as well as of other ripple-flake knives of the same period are considered the high point of the silex tool making techniques. Specialists of the Predynastic period of Egypt, such as Béatrix Midant-Reynes, argue that the quality and amount of work required for the creation of the blade goes beyond what is required for a functional knife. Thus the purpose and value of the knife would be artistic, the blade being a demonstration of technical skills aiming at the beauty of the result. This hypothesis is strengthened by a detailed use-wear analysis of the blade which demonstrates that the knife has never been used.

The blade weights 92.3 grams, its precise dimensions are as follows:

Total length:	18.8 centimetres (7.4 in)
Width of the blade at its center:	5.7 centimetres (2.2 in)
Thickness of the blade at its center:	0.6 centimetres (0.24 in)
Length of blade inside the handle:	2.8 centimetres (1.1 in)
Width of the blade inside the handle:	3.7 centimetres (1.5 in)

=== Handle ===
The handle is made of the ivory of an elephant tusk, and not from a hippopotamus canine tooth as was first thought. The handle was carved along the axis of the tusk, as evidenced by a dark spot located above the head of the "Master of Animals", which is the tip of pulp cavity of the tusk. Once extracted from the tusk, the handle was polished on both sides and hollowed out to receive the blade. The thickness of the handle around the tang of the blade varies from 2 to 3 millimetres (0.12 in), which explains that the ivory is cracked there, with some pieces lost. At the bottom of the handle, the edge was beveled, and probably received a crimp of precious metal that would have reinforced the assemblage of the handle with the blade. At the time of the purchase, Bénédite reported that he could see traces of gold leaf on the bottom of the handle, but this is now gone. The assemblage supports the hypothesis that the knife was not functional: the tang of the blade is too short and the handle too thin for the knife to have been practical.

details of the handle
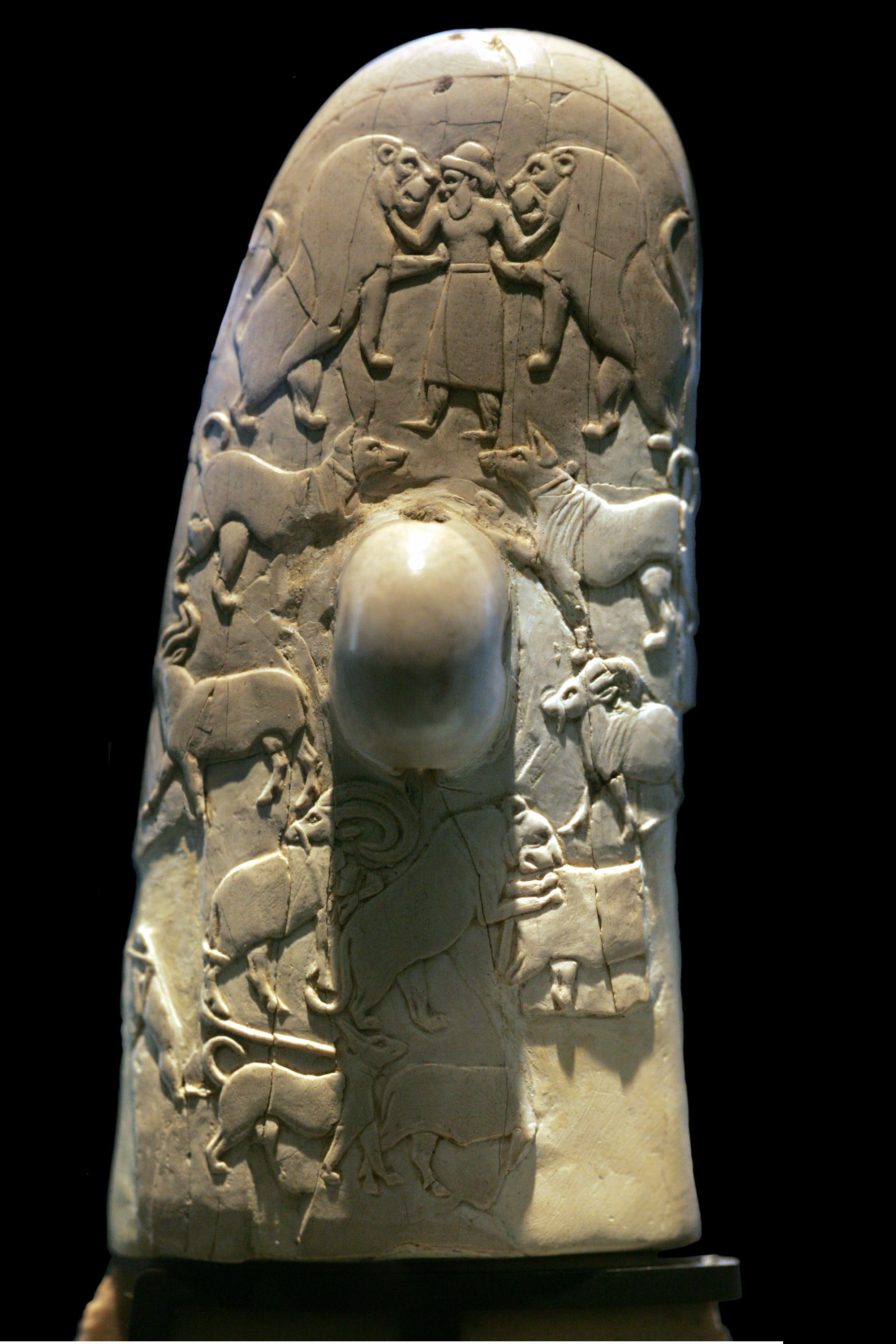
back face of the handle

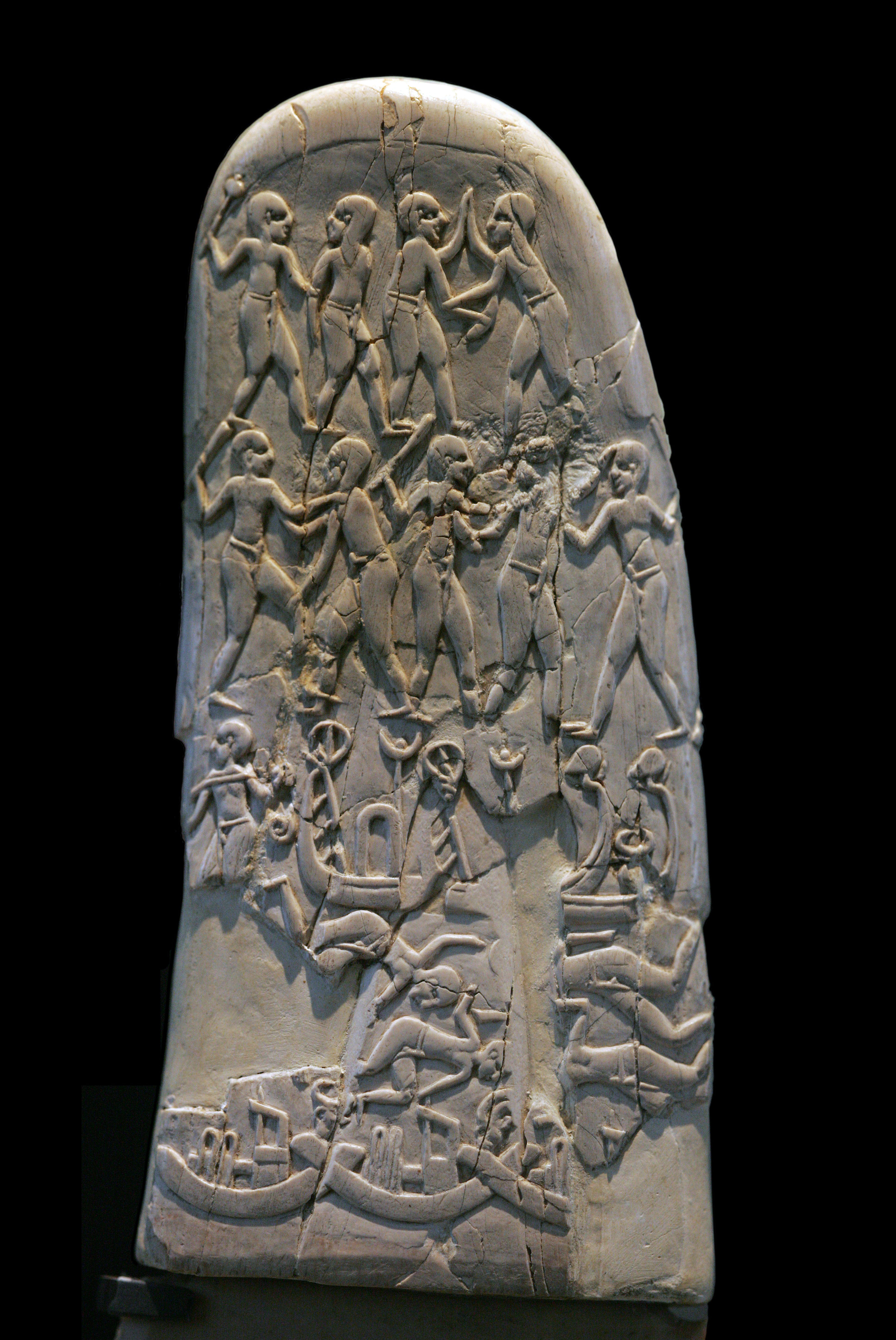
front face of the handle

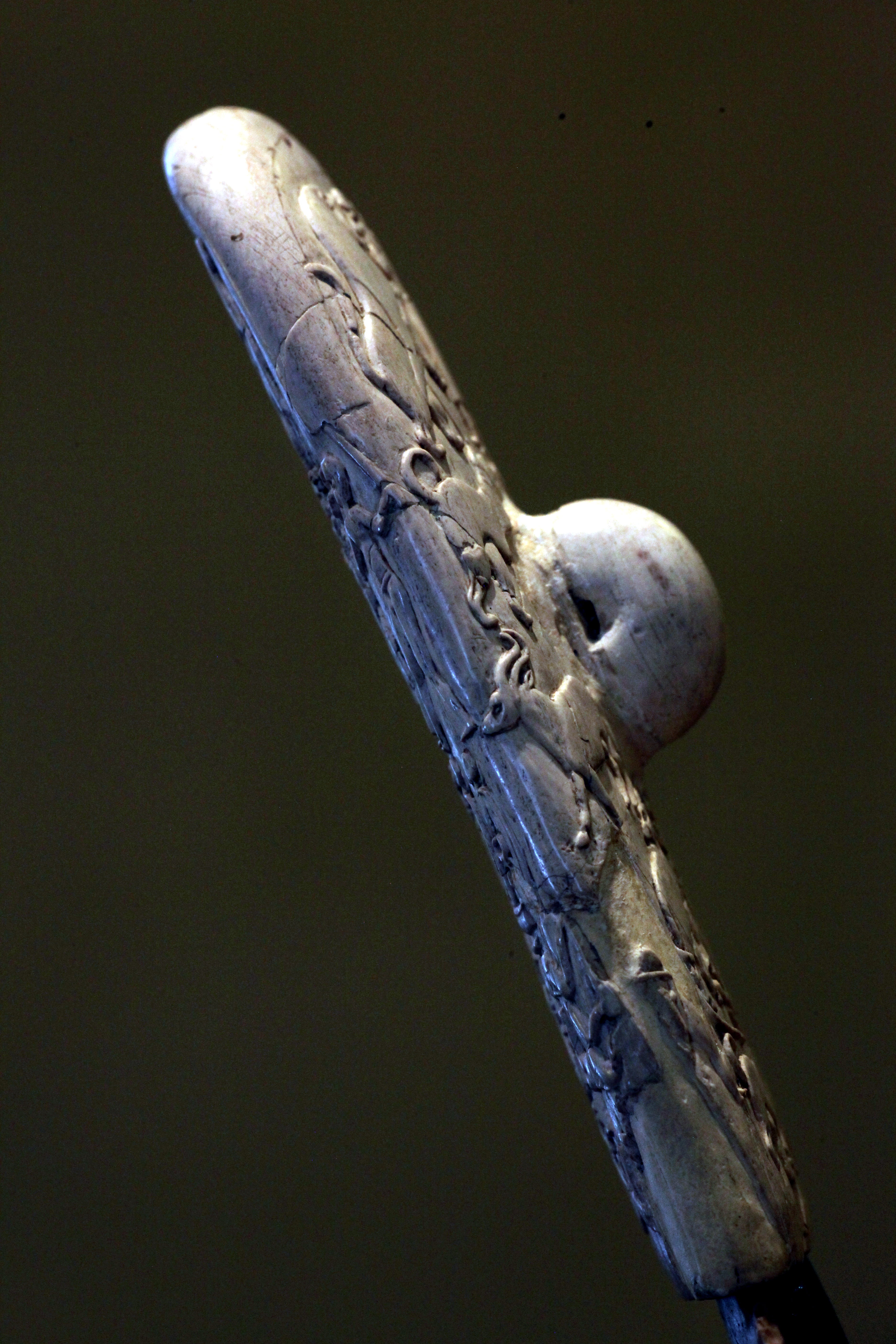
side of the handle

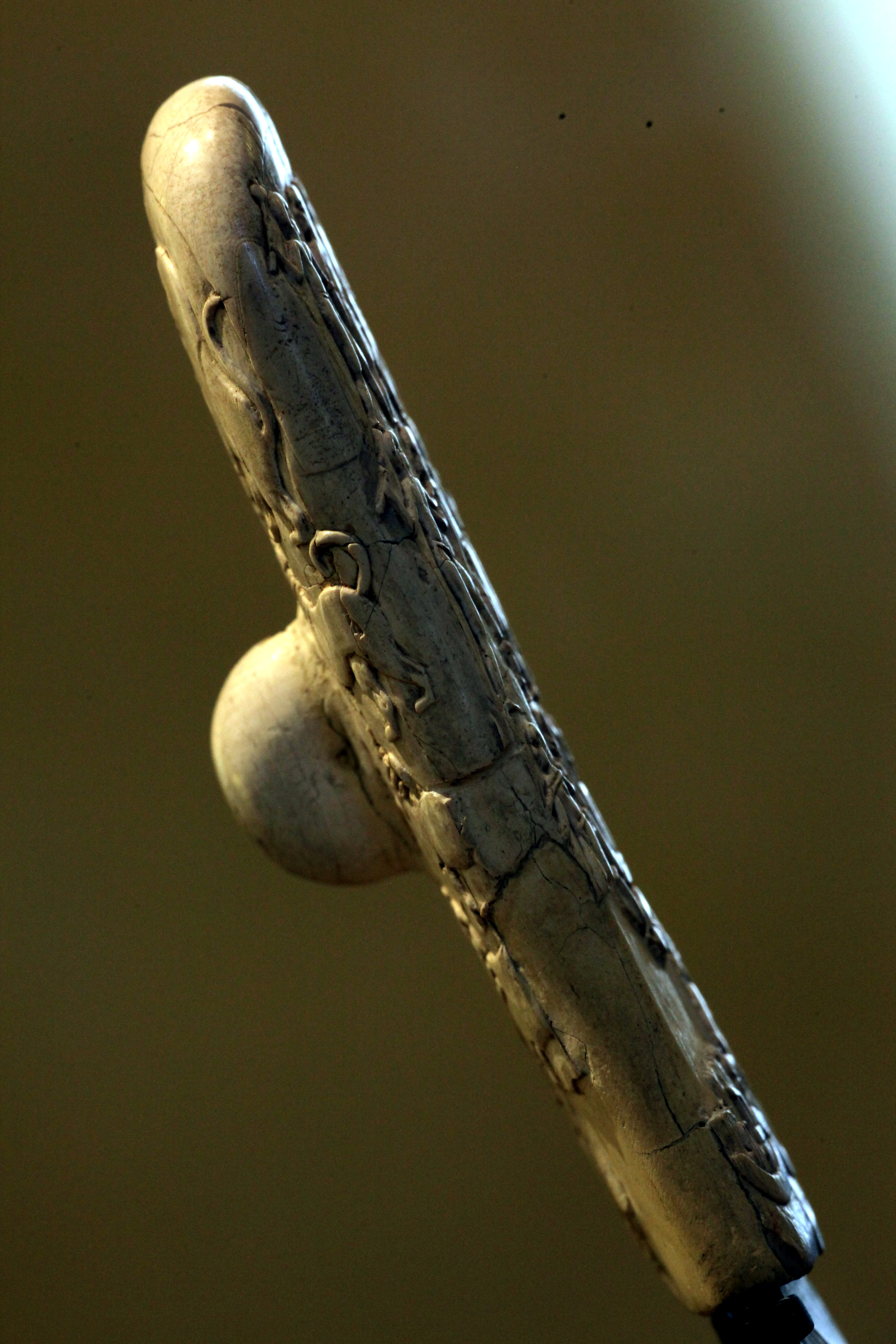
side of the handle

The handle is richly carved in low relief with a scene of a battle on the side that would have faced a right-handed user and with mythological themes on the other side. This side has a knob in its centre through which a strap could be passed. The carvings were executed on the polished surface of the tusk with a silex microburin from top to bottom, one register after the other. The artisan first carved the main figures and then carved the places where the figures meet, such as the arms of the combatants. The depth of the carvings does not exceed 2 millimetres (0.079 in).

Some authors consider that the knob or boss had to be worn outward, which implies that the side with the knob should be considered at the front face, and the smooth side as the back face.

The precise dimensions of the handle are as follows:

Total length:	9.5 centimetres (3.7 in)
Width of the basis:	4.2 centimetres (1.7 in)
Average thickness:	1.2 centimetres (0.47 in)
Length of the knob:	2.0 centimetres (0.79 in)
Width of the knob:	1.3 centimetres (0.51 in)
Thickness of the knob:	1.0 centimetre (0.39 in)

== Reliefs ==
Knife handle of the Metropolitan Museum of Art

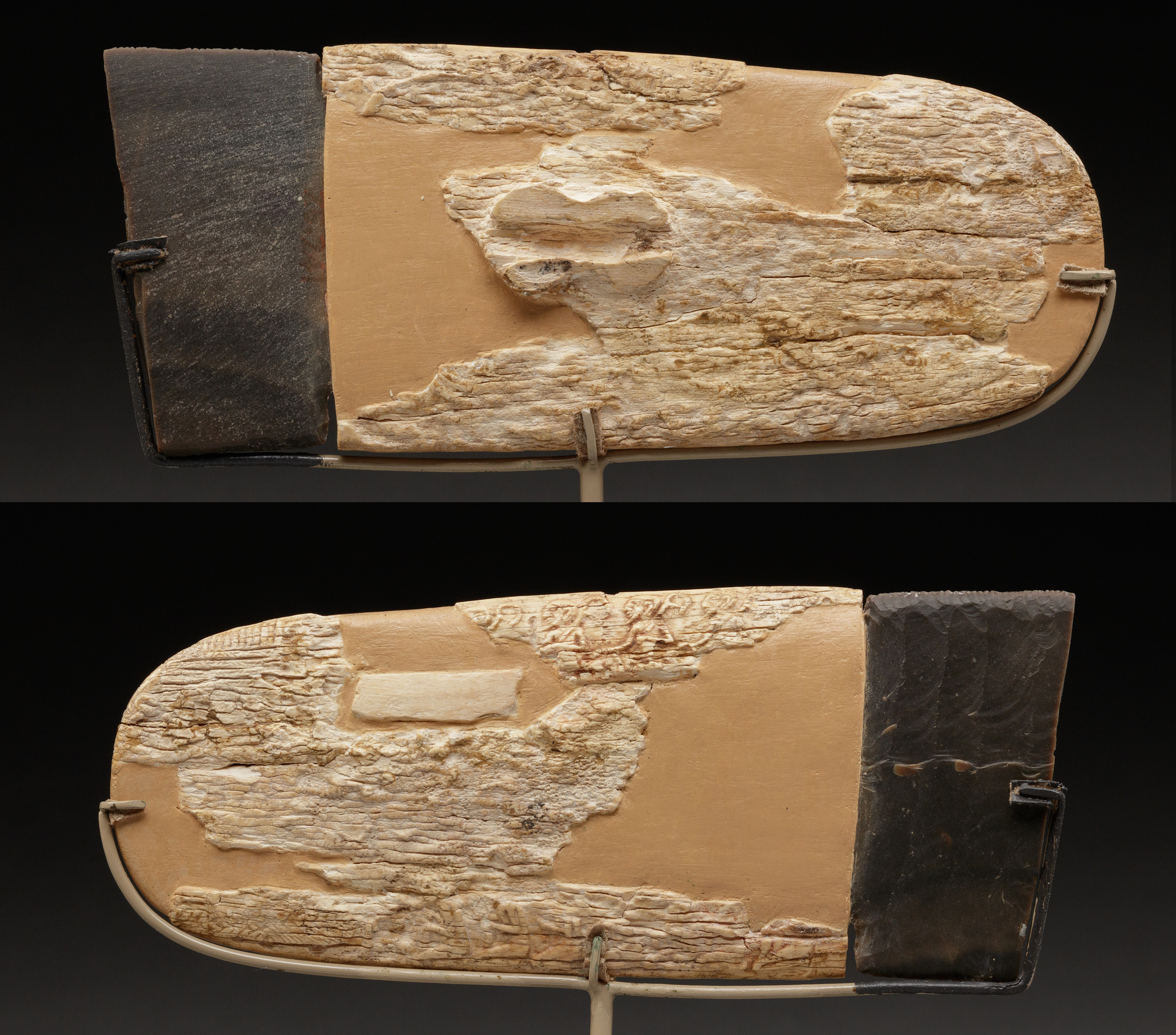
Knife handle

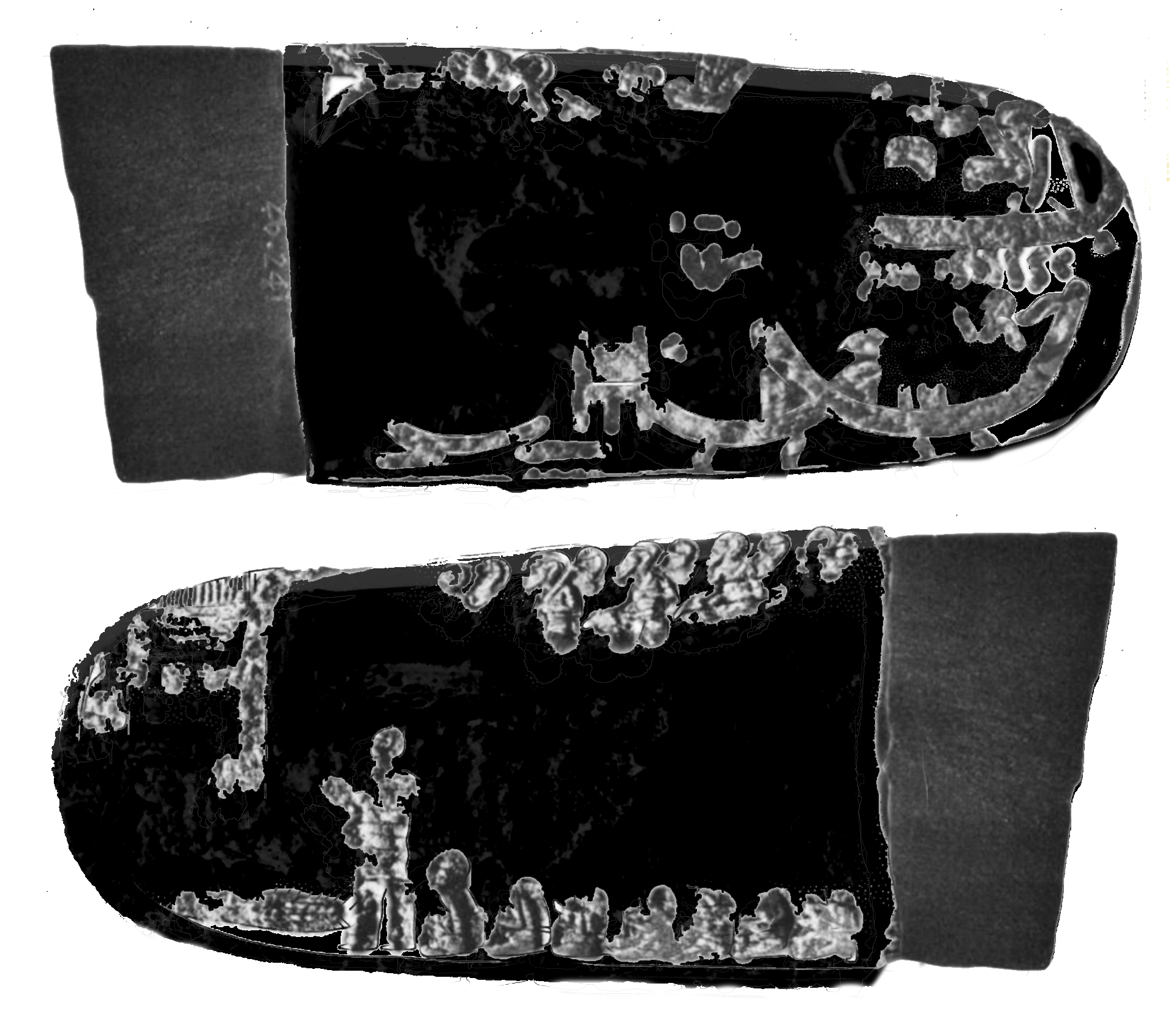
Outline of remaining designs

The knife handle of the Metropolitan Museum of Art (26.241.1) has similar imagery to the Gebel el-Arak Knife, although in much poorer condition, but confirming its authenticity. It shows a ship with raised bow and rounded ships (front), a column of armed soldiers and a row of sitting prisoners led by a standing man, in front of a decorated building (back). Metropolitan Museum of Art (26.241.1)

The handle of the knife is carved on both sides with finely executed figures arranged in five horizontal registers. The side of the handle with the knob shows Mesopotamian influence featuring the Master of Animals motif, very common in Mesopotamian art, in the form of a figure wearing Mesopotamian clothing flanked by two upright lions symbolising the Morning and Evening Stars (now both identified with the planet Venus). Robert du Mesnil du Buisson said the central figure is the god El. David Rohl identifies him with Meskiagkasher, who "journeyed upon the sea and came ashore at the mountains". Nicolas Grimal refrains from speculating on the identity of the ambiguous figure, referring to it as a "warrior". Modern scholarship generally attributes the back reliefs to Mesopotamian influence, and more specifically attribute the design of the clothed wrestler to the Mesopotamian "priest-king" Master of Animals images of the Late Uruk period. Similar portraits of men with beards and torus-like headgear also appear on numerous figurines of the Naqada I period and dated to 3800-3400 BCE. These figurines are generally carved on ivory tusks and seemingly wear long cloaks.

The fighting figurines are armed with flint knives, clubs and also pear-shaped maces, which are considered as an innovation introduced from Mesopotamia, replacing the initial Egyptian disk-shaped mace. Some authors have suggested that the reliefs represent a battle between warriors of the cities of Abydos and Hierakonpolis, the two main rival Egyptian cities of the period, and that the victor was Abydos, the presence of the lion-fighting Mesopotamian king remaining unexplained and attributed to artistic influence from Mesopotamia. In effect, most of Egypt became unified under rulers from Abydos during the Naqada III period.

This side of the handle also contains a "knob", a perforated suspension lug that would have supported the knife handle, keeping it level while resting on a level surface and also could have been used to thread a cord to hang it from the body as an ornament.

Another knife with very similar iconography, including depictions of warriors, prisoners and nearly identical types of ships can be seen in the Metropolitan Museum of Art (Accession number: 26.241.1). Numerous objects from the Naqada II period are similar to the Gebel el-Arak Knife in style and content.

Gebel el-Arak Knife (details of the reliefs)
Mesopotamian scenes, hunting of animals	Master of animals, wearing a long skirt and trousers, as well as a brimmed hat (Back, 1st register). Collar-wearing domestic dogs (Back, 2nd register, around the knob). Lioness attacking a wild bull (Back, 4th register), another Mesopotamian motif. Naked man with penile sheath (fragment) walking a dog on a leash (Back, 5th register). Naked and shaven-headed men are a regular fixture of the Art of Uruk and Sumerian religion.
Battle scenes	Shaven-headed attackers armed with maces and knives, against unarmed opponents with long hair, all wearing penile sheaths (Front, 1st register). Long-haired man (center) using a knife against shaven-headed baton-wielding enemies (Front, 2nd register) Shaven-headed man towing high-prowed boats, of a type seen on Sumerian Uruk period seals and artworks (see example). Possibly part of the depiction of a naval battle. (Front, 3rd register) Shaven-headed men drowning, in a possible depiction of a naval battle. (Front, 4th register) Egyptian-type bow-shaped Nile boat. Possibly part of the depiction of a naval battle. (Front, 5th register)

=== Parallels ===
Several of the themes and designs visible in the Gebel el-Arak knife can also be seen in other contemporary Egyptian works of art, such as the fresco from Tomb 100 at Hierakonpolis (c. 3500–3200 BCE), with the scene of the Master of animals, showing a man fighting against two lions, the individual fighting scenes or the boats. Stylistically, the Gebel el-Arak Knife belongs to an important group of Naqada II ivory carvings.

Hierakonpolis fresco
The first known Egyptian fresco, Tomb 100, Hierakonpolis, Naqada II culture (c. 3500–3200 BCE)	Master of animals. Individual fighting scene Hunting dog on a leash Egyptian boat, in contrast with the black foreign boat with high prow.

Some of the figures found in Hierakonpolis, or the enemies of the Bull Palette, also dated to the same period, show similarities, such as the penile sheath worn by men.

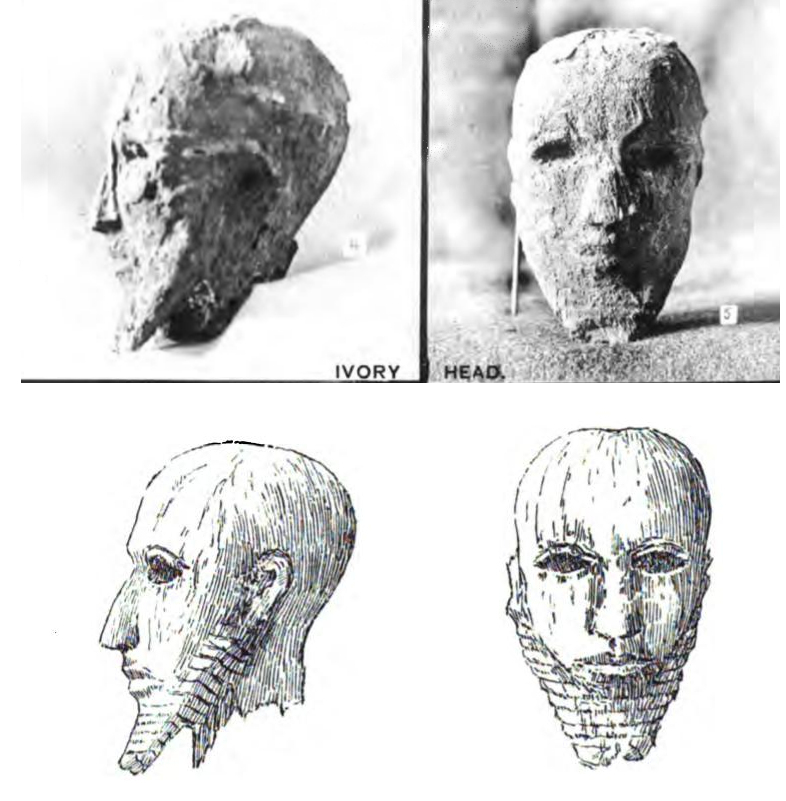
Shaven-headed man with beard, from Hierakonpolis.

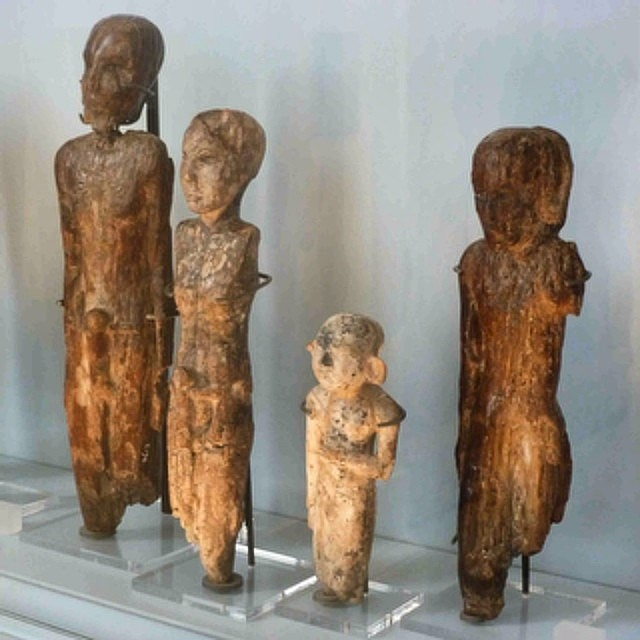
Male statuettes with shaven heads and penile sheaths, from Hierakonpolis.

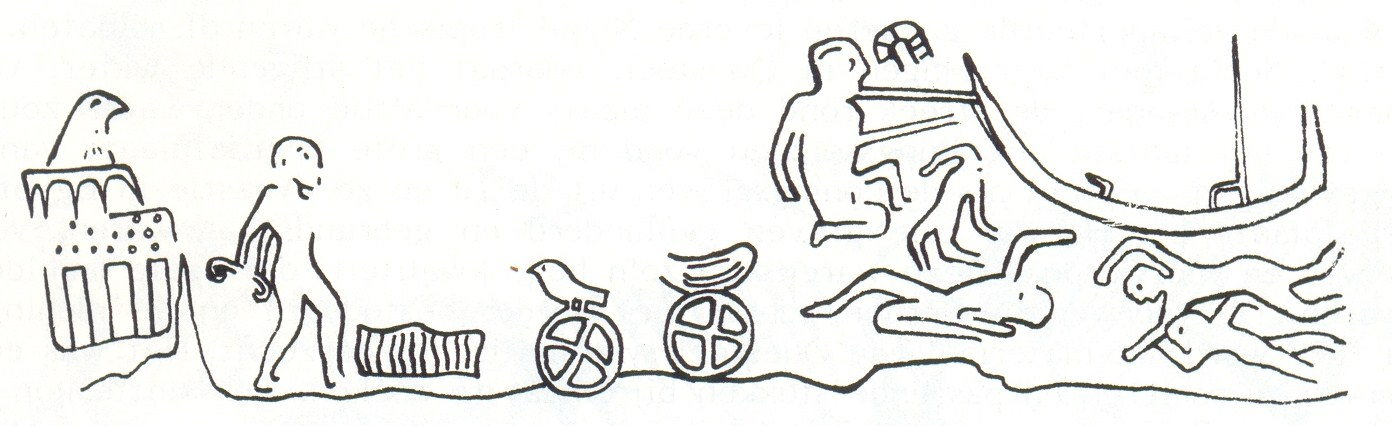
Petroglyphs from Gebel Sheikh Suleiman.

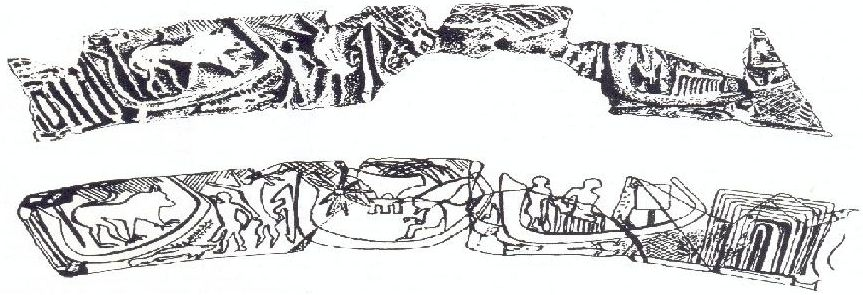
Qustul incense burner fragments and reconstitution

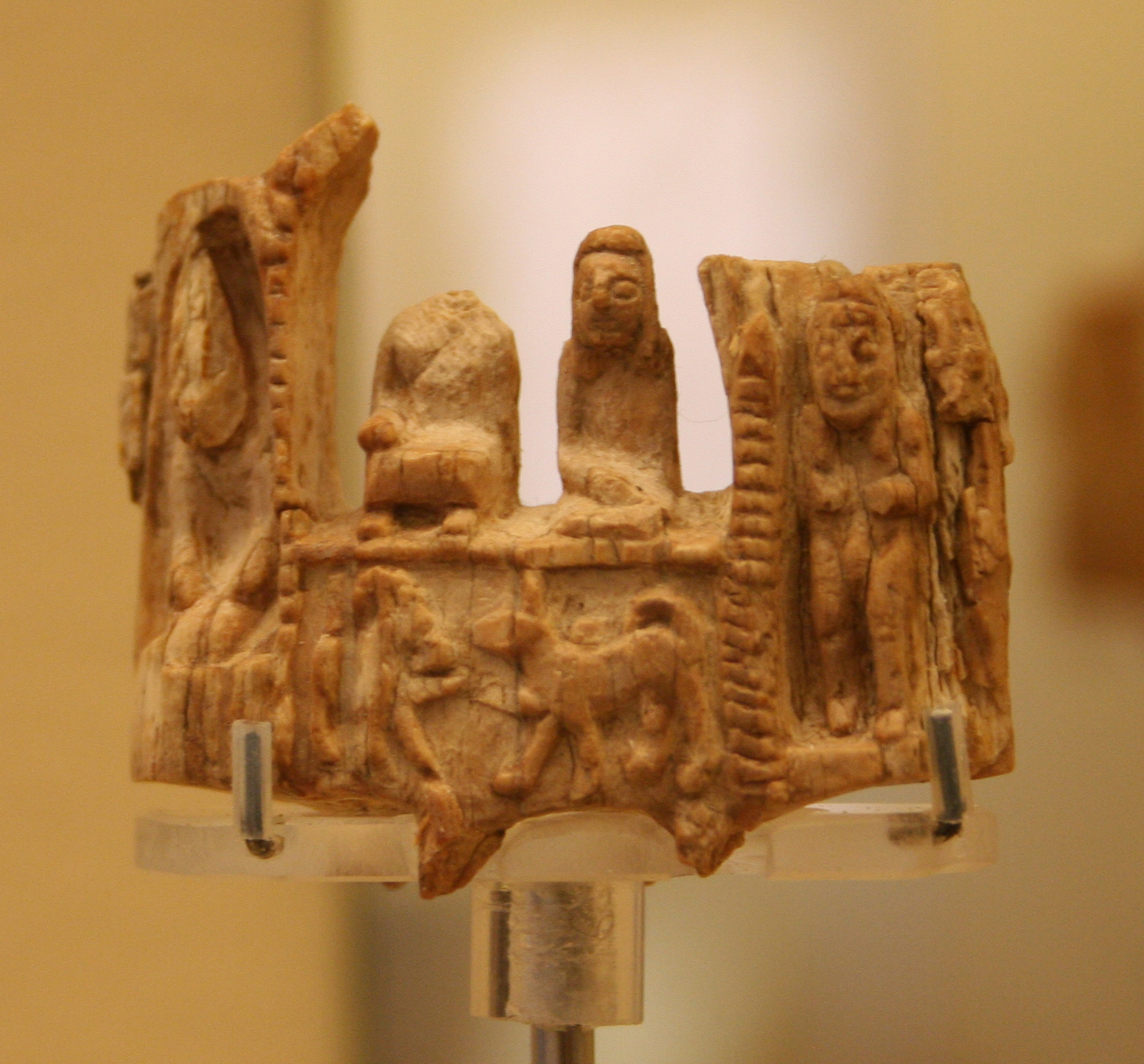
Naqada IId carving, with dynastic rulers and animals, and kneeling soldiers on the reverse.

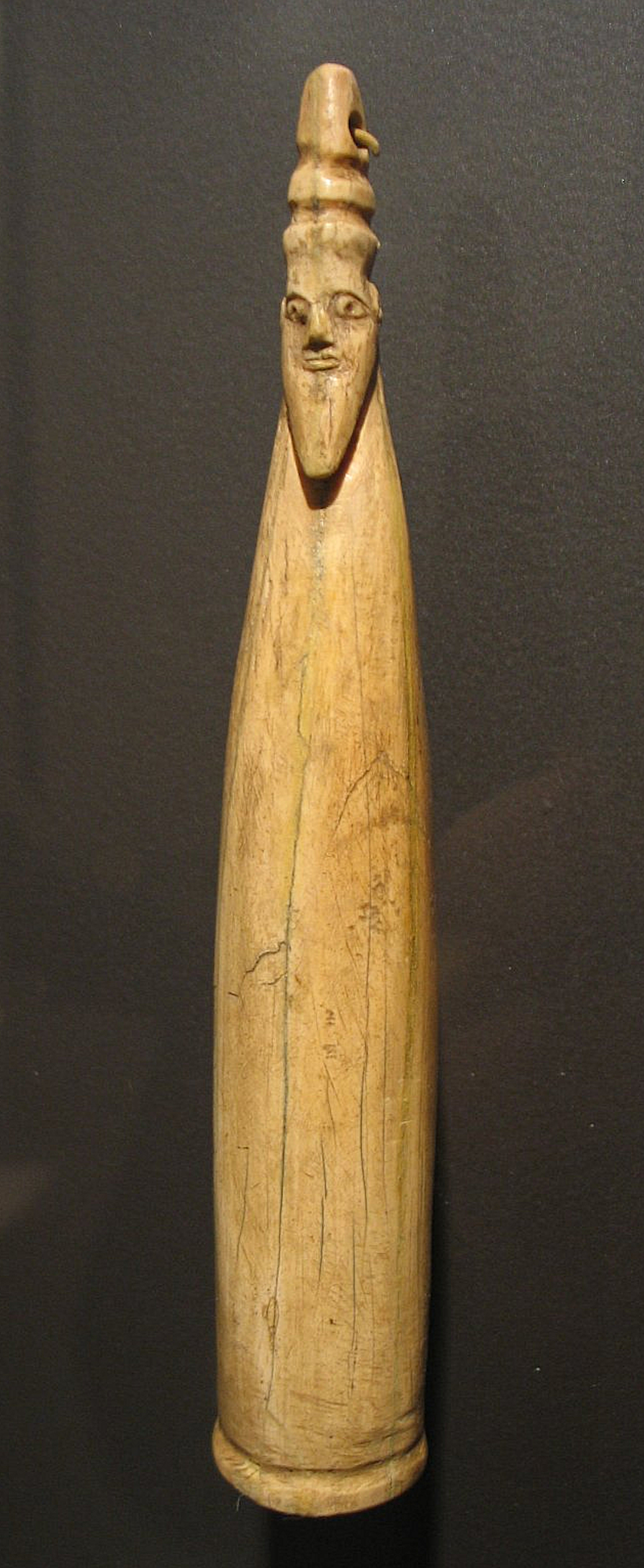
Man with torus-like headgear, reminiscent of the Mesopotamian king. Late Naqada I- Early Naqada II 3800-3400 BCE, Brooklyn Museum.

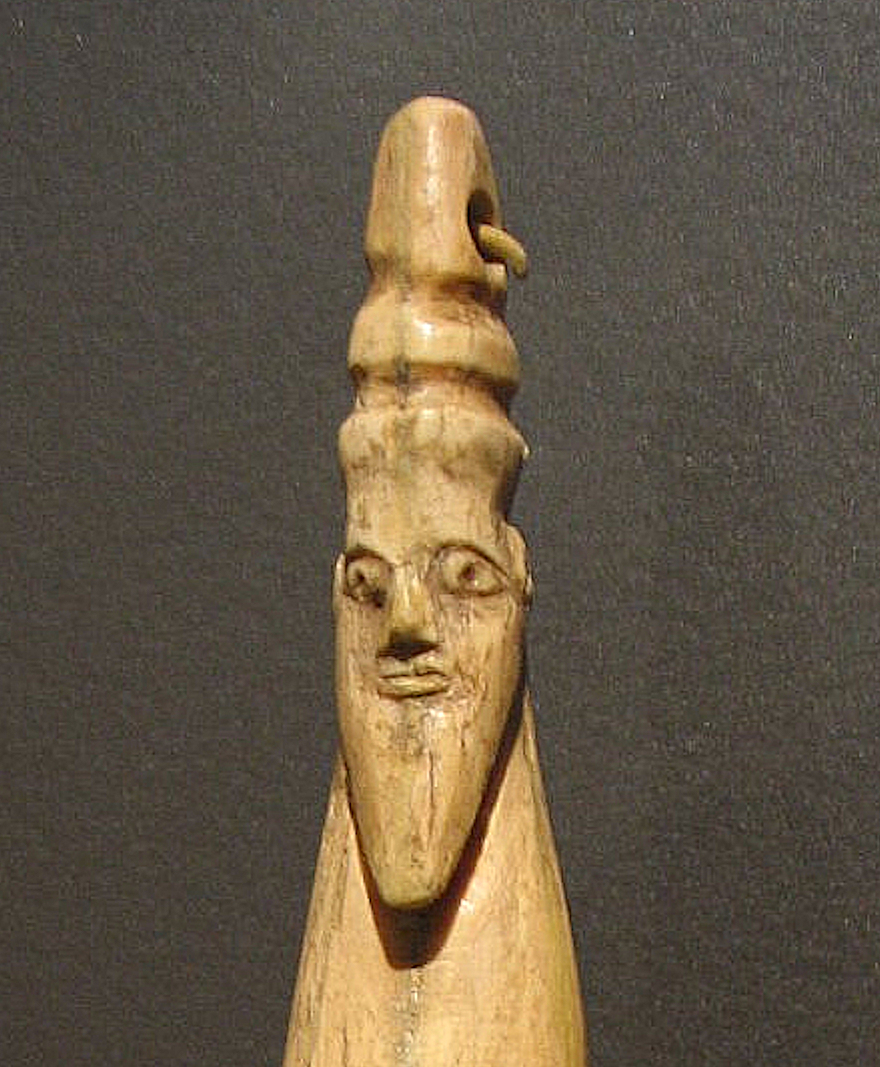
Carved head of bearded man with torus-like headgear, reminiscent of the Mesopotamian king. Late Naqada I- Early Naqada II 3800-3400 BCE, Brooklyn Museum.

== Similar knives ==
Today a total of 17 similar ceremonial knives with decorated handles are known. These knives comprise:

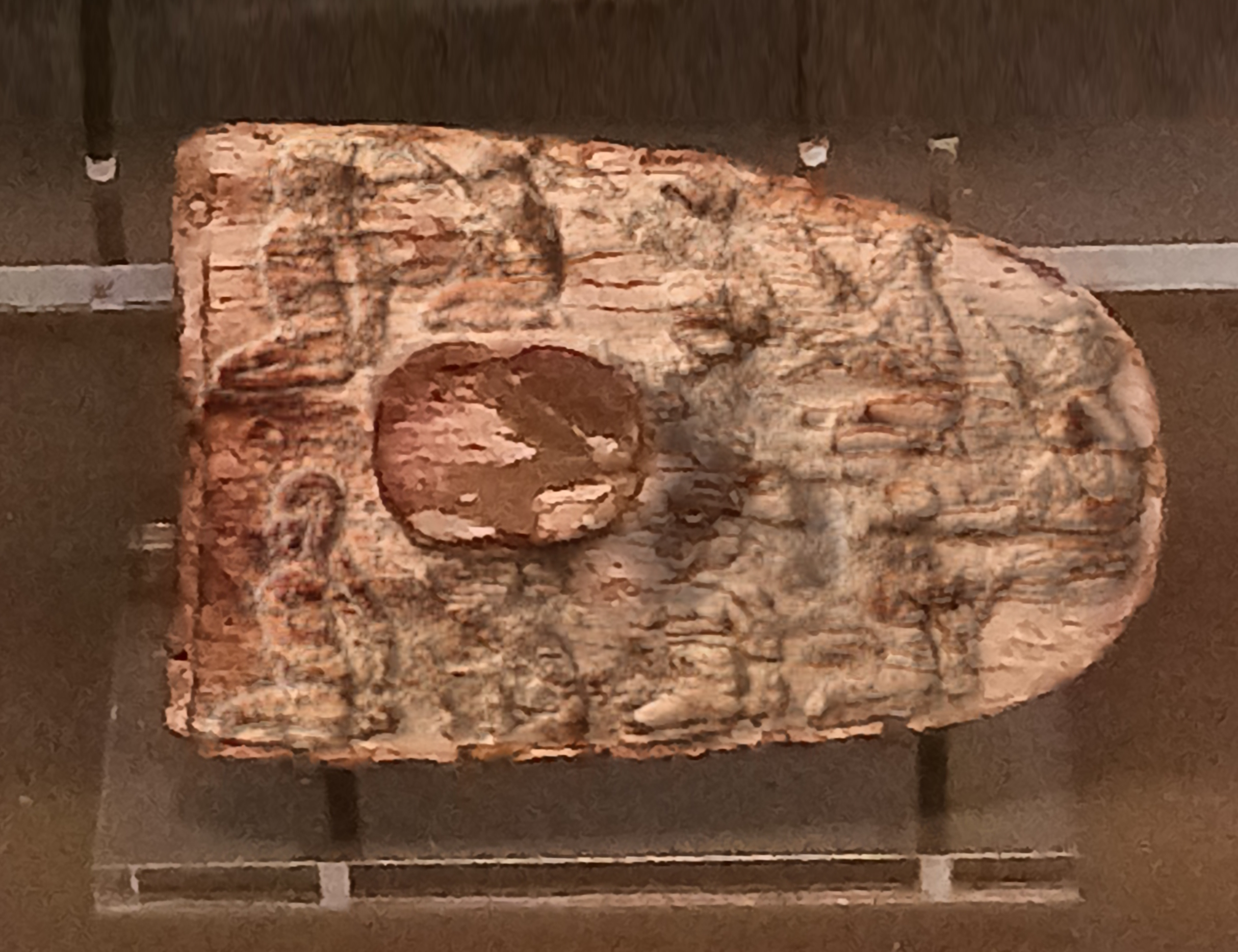
Ivory knife handle depicting rows of kneeling prisoners. Hierakonpolis. Nadaqa IID. Ashmolean Museum E.4975.

- The Ashmolean knife handle from the Main Deposit at Hierakonpolis (Naqada IID), depicting rows on kneeling prisoners on one side, and on the other side an enthroned ruler with a white crown. The ruler seems to be standing in front of a sanctuary, and is accompanied by the symbol of an elephant trampling snakes.
Ritual knife with animals

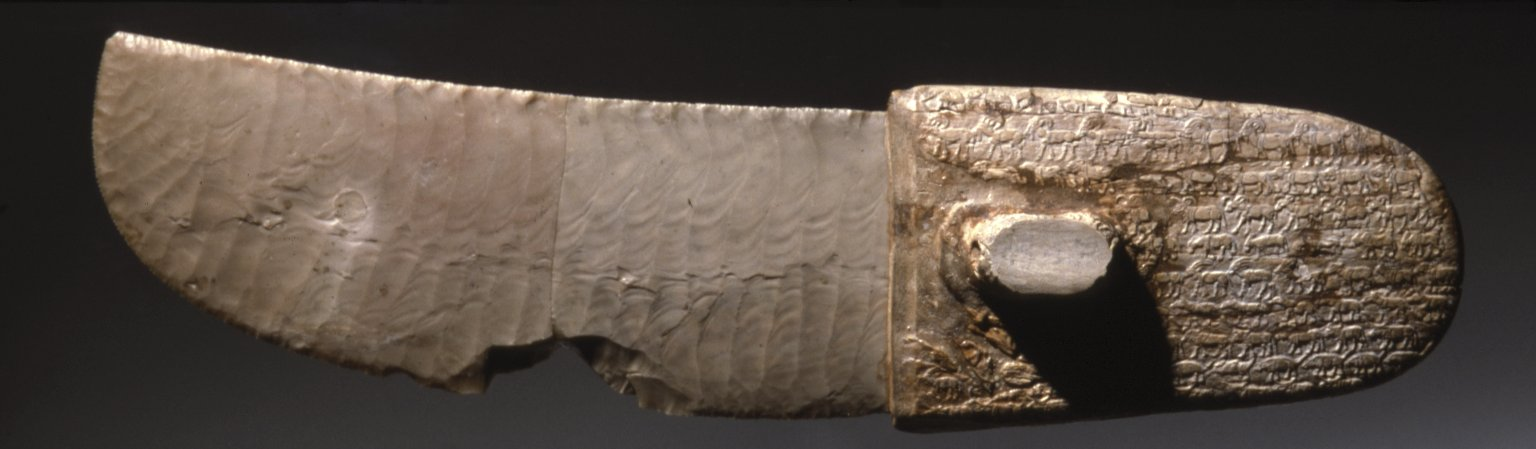
The Abu Zeidan ritual knife, dating to Naqada III period (ca. 3300-3100 BCE), with 227 sculpted animals, now on display at the Brooklyn Museum.

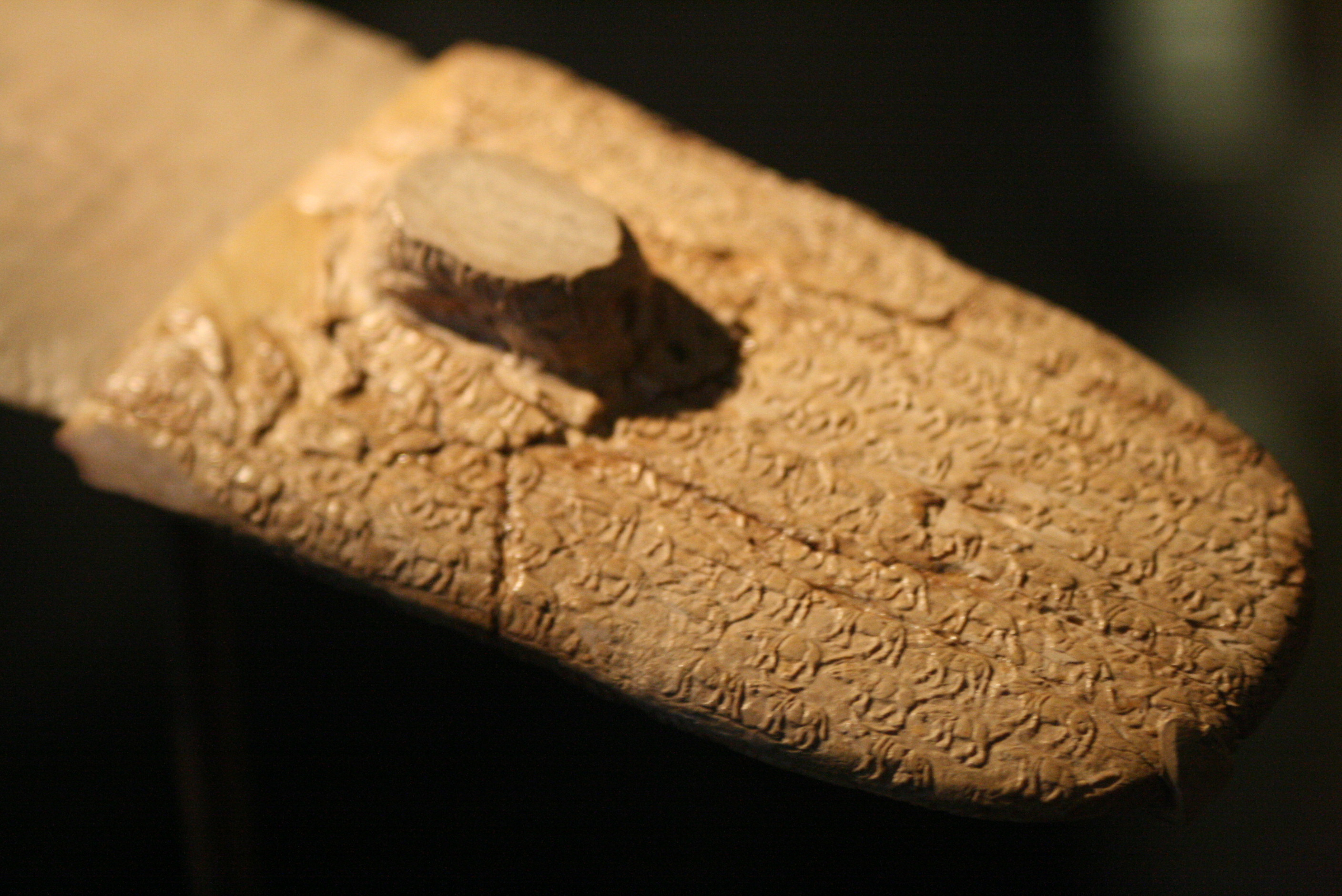
Knife handle detail with animals.

- The ritual knife of the Brooklyn Museum, discovered by Jacques de Morgan in the Tomb 32 at Abu Zeidan near Edfu, and similar in size to the Gebel el-Arak knife. The handle of the knife, made of elephant ivory, is decorated with 227 animals carved in 10 registers on both faces. The figures are tightly packed and entirely cover the handle. They represent real animals, all depicted at approximatively the same size and arranged in processions by species: elephants (some walking on snakes), storks, lions, oryxes and bovids. Other less common animals interrupt the processions: a giraffe, a heron, a bustard and a dog chasing after an oryx. Finally, two electric catfish are represented on the outer margin of the handle. The only non-animal figure is a rosette, a royal symbol of Mesopotamian origin found on Egyptian artifacts of the predynastic period and until the 1st dynasty, such as the Scorpion Macehead and Narmer palette. The decoration of the handle is very similar to that of a predynastic hair comb, on display at the Metropolitan Museum of Art.
- The Pitt-Rivers knife, bought in the mid 19th century by Reverend G. Chester from an antique dealer who reported finding it in Sheikh Hamada, near Sohag in Upper Egypt. The knife dates back to the late predynastic period, from ca. 3300 BC to 3100 BC, and is now on display at the British Museum's Early Egypt gallery, room 64, under the catalog number EA 68512. The blade of the knife is virtually identical in style to that of the Gebel el-Arak knife, although slightly larger. The iconography of the handle is similar to that of the ritual knife, comprising six rows of wild animals carved in raised relief. The animals include elephants walking on snakes, storks, a heron, lions followed by a dog, short and long-horned cattle, perhaps jackals, an ibis, a deer, hartebeests, oryxes and a barbary sheep. Similar motifs are found on pottery and clay seals from funerary contexts of the predynastic and early dynastic periods, most notably in Abydos.
- The Gebel-Tarif knife, dating to the Naqada III period. On one side, the handle of the knife shows two snakes encircling rosettes. The other side is arranged in four rows. The top and second rows depict scenes of predation with a leopard and a lion attacking ibexes. Beneath these is a domesticated heavy hunting dog wearing a collar pursued by a lion or another dog. Finally the bottom row represents a griffin and an ibex The knife is now in the Egyptian Museum under the catalog number CG 14265.

Two worn and battered knives can be found at the Metropolitan Museum of Art and at the National Archaeological Museum (France).

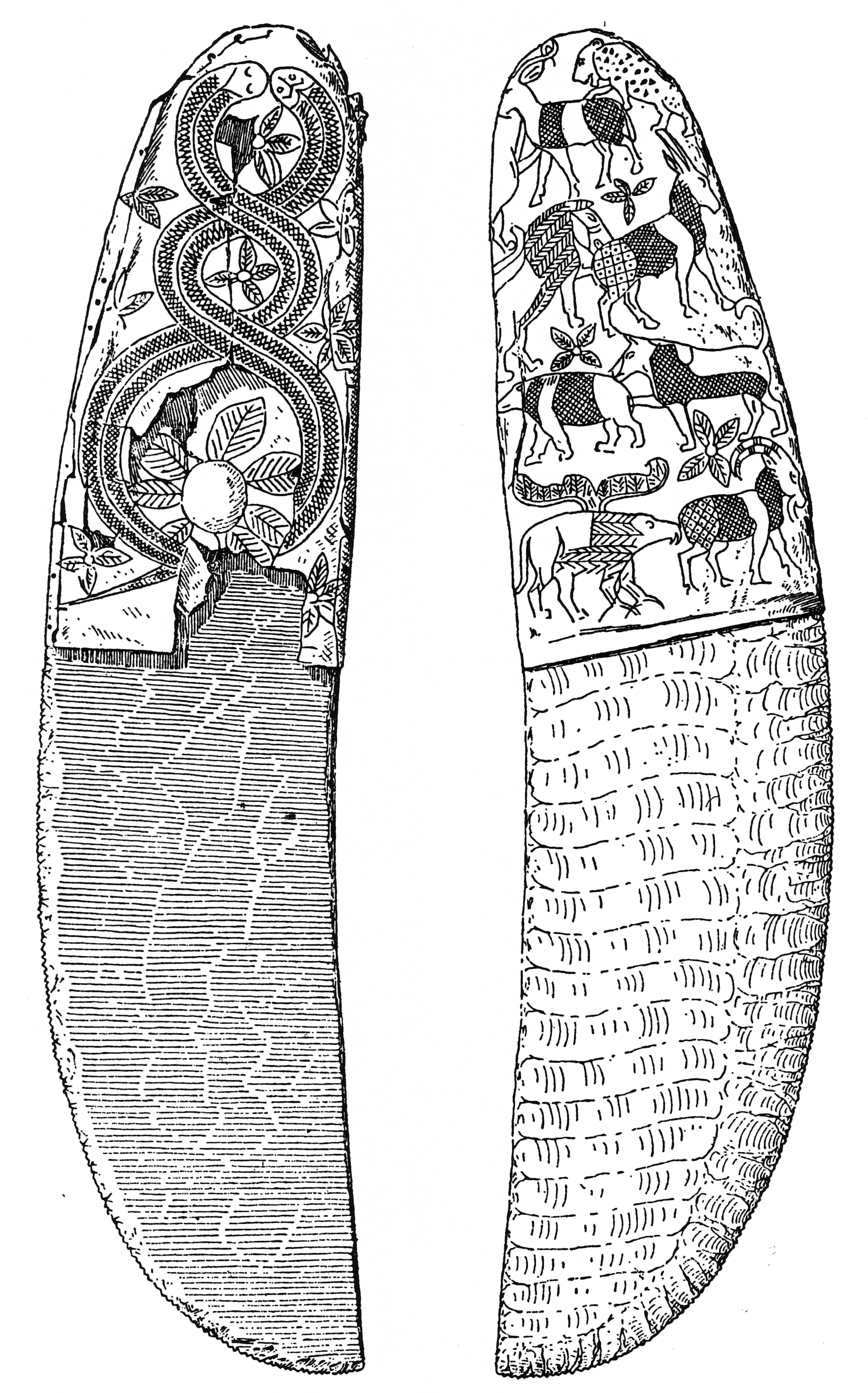
The Gebel-Tarif knife of the Naqada III period. The "snake twist around rosette" is another Mesopotamian motif.

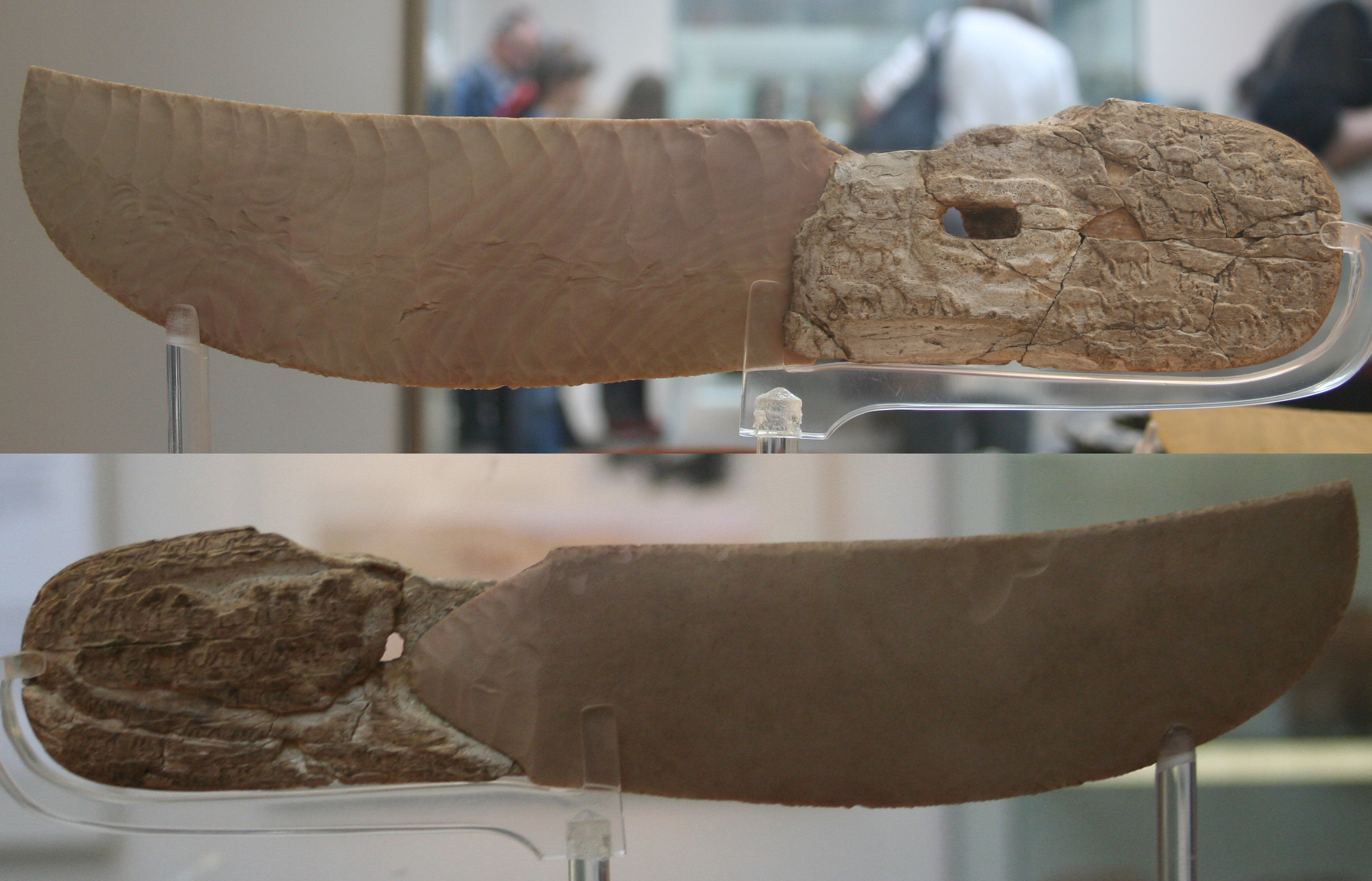
Pitt-Rivers knife, ca. 3325 cal. BCE. British Museum.

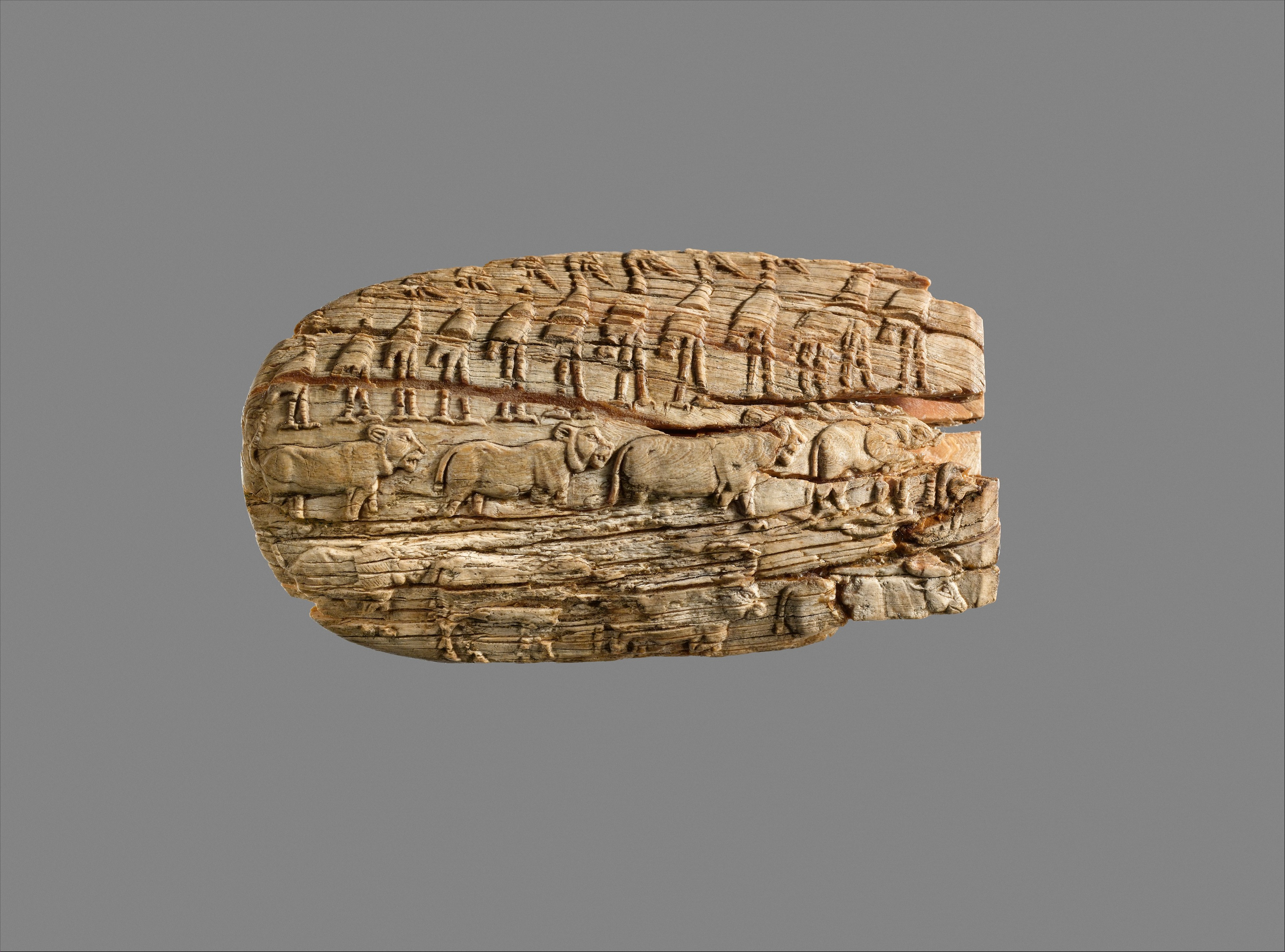
The Carnarvon knife handle, circa 3200 BCE. Metropolitan Museum of Art.

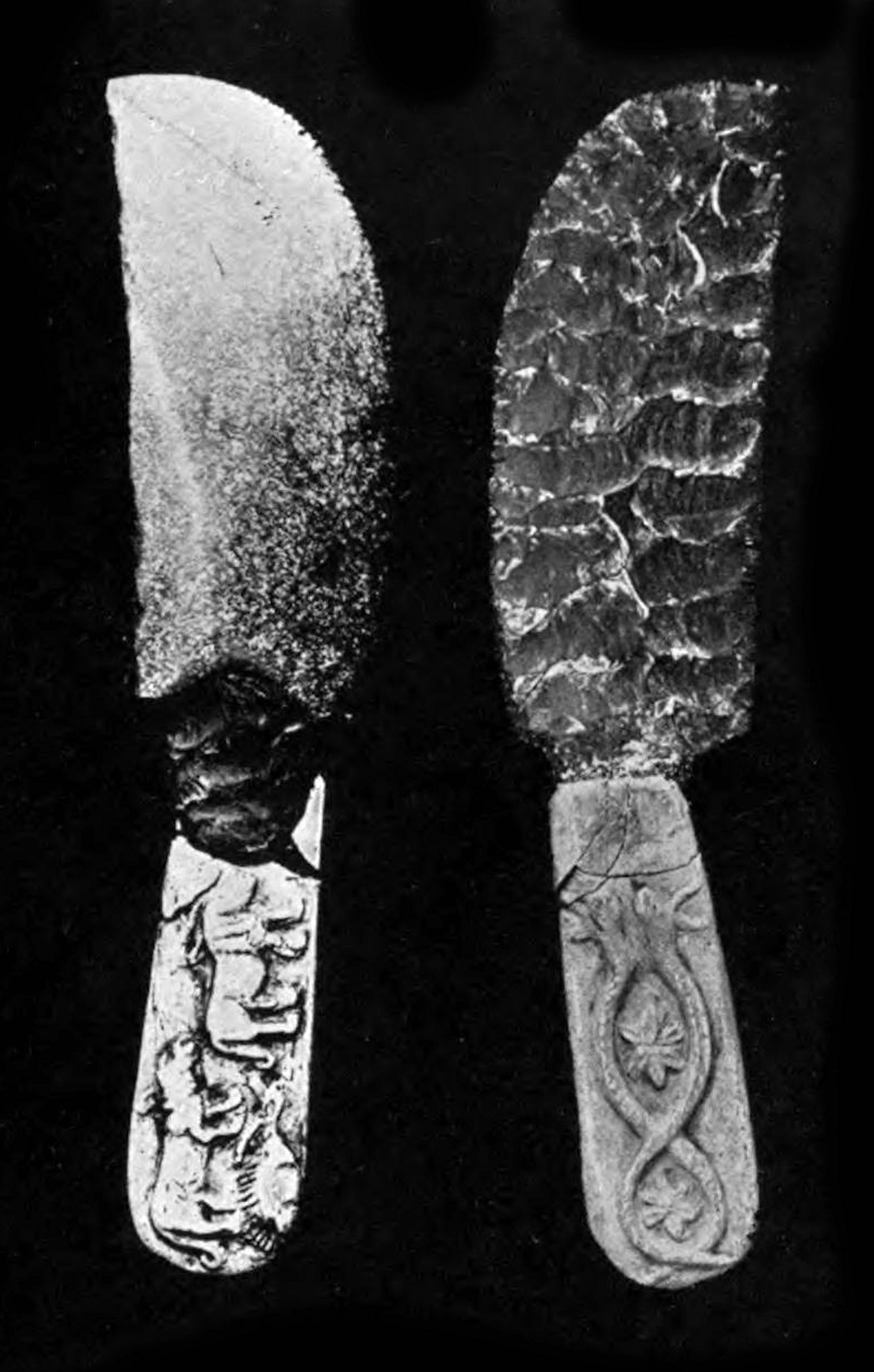
Prehistoric knife, Naqada II period, Petrie Museum UC 16294. The "snake twist around rosette" is another Mesopotamian motif.

The perfect similarity between the blades of these knives and that of the Gebel el-Arak led scholar Diane L. Holmes to propose that the knives were all produced by a small number of workshops in one area and may be the product of a few craftsmen who practised this extremely specialized skill over a period of a few generations.

== See also ==
- Master of Animals
