= Guillemette Andreu =

French Egyptologist and archaeologist

Guillemette Andreu-Lanoë (born August 3, 1948, in Paris), is a French Egyptologist and archaeologist. A former member of the French Institute of Oriental Archaeology of Cairo, she has been a curator and director of the Department of Egyptian Antiquities of the Louvre Museum since May 2007.

== Biography ==
After studying history, Andreu specialized in Egyptology (hieroglyphs, hieratic, Coptic) and produced a thesis on the law and order in Ancient Egypt at Sorbonne in 1978 under the direction of Professor Jean Leclant. Following this academic work, she was appointed scientific member of the French Institute of Oriental Archaeology in Cairo in 1978–1982.

There, for four years, she participated in excavations of this institute in the Nile Valley (Deir el-Medina), in the oases of the Western Desert (Balat at Dakhla Oasis, the Nécropole de Douch at Kharga, and a Christian monastic site in the Nile Delta (the Kellia). Meanwhile, she continued research on Pharaonic Egypt and civil and administrative measures likely to have been taken during the daily lives of Egyptians at the Pharaonic era.

Teaching Assistant at the Louvre's Egyptian department in 1982, she returned as design engineer in 1991 after a stint at the DRAC Ile-de-France. In 1997 she was appointed curator and was assigned to the Musée national du Moyen Age-Thermes de Cluny (Paris). In 1998 she was curator of the exhibition "Egyptology, fantasy and science" in Paris.

At the Louvre in 2001, she was curator of the exhibition on Deir el-Medina and the Valley of the Kings which was held there from 15 April to 5 August 2002, Brussels (RMAH) from September to January 2003 and in Turin from February to May 2003. The success of this exhibition (450,000 visitors in Paris) was exceptional. In 2005, she curated an exhibition in Nagoya, Fukuoka, Tokyo, Japan which attracted a great number of Japanese.

She has participated in excavations of the Louvre led by Christiane Ziegler on the site of Saqqara from 1993 to 2001. From 2003 to 2005 she directed the archaeological site of Deir el-Medina.

In May 2007 she was appointed Director of the Department of Egyptian Antiquities from the Louvre Museum.

She is chief curator of the exhibit "Meroe", presented at Louvre from March to September 2010.

Guillemette Andreu is a member of the Scientific Council and Board of Directors of the IFAO, member of the scientific committee and joint Franco-Egyptian Centre's study of Karnak, a member of the Committee on Ministry searches Foreign and European Affairs, Member of the Scientific Committee of Egyptology Museum of Turin, scientific advisor of the future museum ethno-archaeological of Qena (near Dendera, and member of the reading committee of the Revue des Musées de France (Revue du Louvre).

Decorations include the Chevalier des Arts et Lettres (2002) and the Chevalier of the Legion of Honour (2006)
