= List of Egyptologists =

This is a partial list of Egyptologists. An Egyptologist is any archaeologist, historian, linguist, or art historian who specializes in Egyptology, the scientific study of Ancient Egypt and its antiquities. Demotists are Egyptologists who specialize in the study of the Demotic language and field of Demotic Studies. Although a practitioner of the disciplined study of Ancient Egypt and Egyptian antiquities is an "Egyptologist", the field of Egyptology is not exclusive to such practitioners.

== A ==
Cyril Aldred

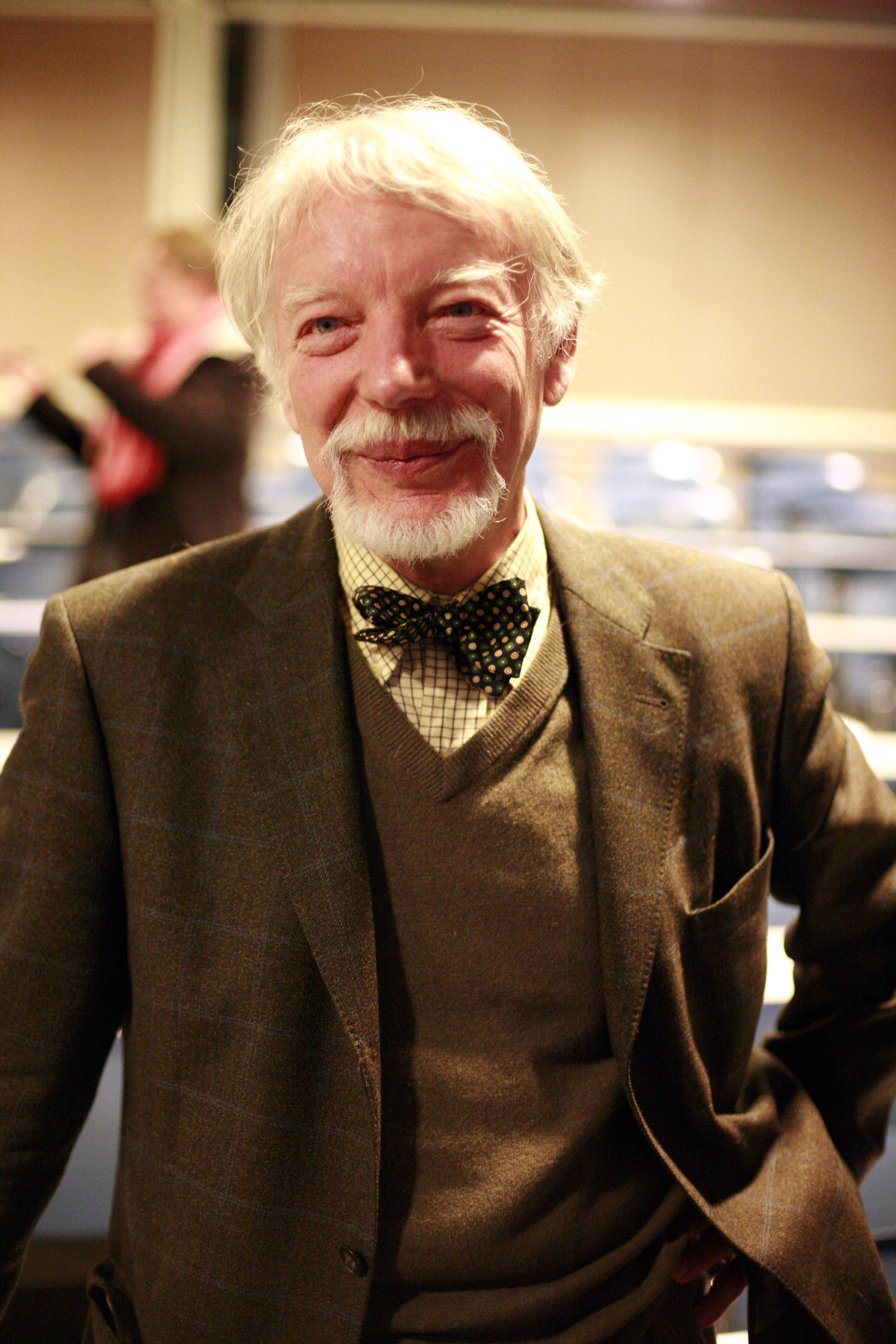
Jan Assmann

- Barbara Adams (British, 1945–2002)
- Johan David Åkerblad (Swedish, 1763–1819)
- Cyril Aldred (British, 1914–1991)
- Alan F. Alford (British, 1961–2011)
- Charles Allberry (English, 1911–1943)
- Frank Shaver Allen (American, 1860–1930)
- James Peter Allen (American, born 1945)
- Maurice Alliot (French, 1903–1960)
- Hartwig Altenmüller (German, born 1938)
- Émile Amélineau (French, 1850–1915)
- Alessia Amenta (Italian)
- Guillemette Andreu (French, born 1948)
- Tadeusz Andrzejewski (Polish, 1923–1961)
- A. J. Arkell (English, 1898–1980)
- Solange Ashby (American)
- Jan Assmann (German, 1938–2024)
- Éric Aubourg (French)
- Sydney Hervé Aufrère (French, born 1951)
- Émile Prisse d'Avennes (French, 1807–1879)
- Edward R. Ayrton (British, 1882–1914)

== B ==
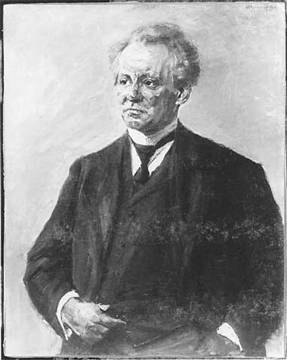
Ludwig Borchardt

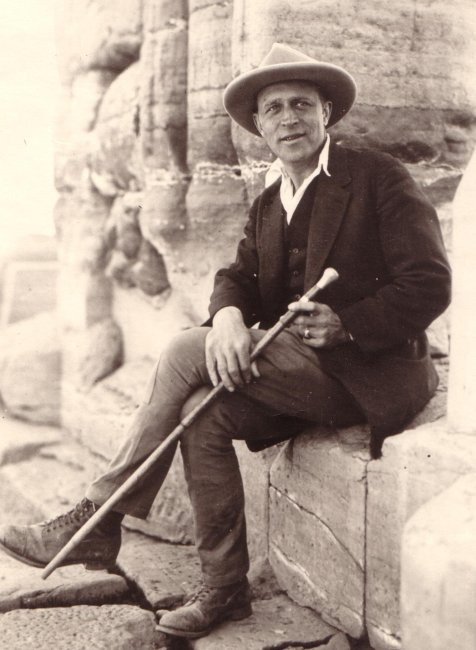
Fernand Bisson de La Roque

- Alexander Badawy (Egyptian, 1913–1986)
- Roger S. Bagnall (American, born 1947)
- John Baines (British, born 1946)
- Pascale Ballet (French, born 1953)
- Émile Baraize (French, 1874–1952)
- Kathryn A. Bard (American, born 1946)
- J. W. B. Barns (British, 1912–1974)
- Alessandro Barsanti (Italian, 1858–1917)
- Hussein Bassir (Egyptian, born 1973)
- Marcelle Baud (French, 1890–1987)
- Michel Baud (French, 1963–2012)
- Laurent Bavay (Belgian, born 1972)
- Alfred Chester Beatty (American, 1875–1968)
- Nathalie Beaux-Grimal (French, born 1960)
- Jürgen von Beckerath (German, 1920–2016)
- Idris Bell (British, 1879–1967)
- Giovanni Belzoni (Italian, 1778–1823)
- Georges Aaron Bénédite (French 1857–1926)
- Yosef Ben-Jochannan (American, 1918–2015)
- Chris Bennett (American, 1953–2014)
- Margaret Benson (English, 1865–1916)
- Laurel Bestock (American)
- Susanne Bickel (Swiss, born 1960)
- Manfred Bietak (Austrian, born 1940)
- Jean Bingen (Belgian, 1920–2012)
- Samuel Birch (English, 1813–1885)
- Friedrich Wilhelm von Bissing (German, 1873–1956)
- Fernand Bisson de La Roque (French, 1885–1958)
- Gun Björkman (Swedish, 1935–2001)
- Aylward M. Blackman (British, 1883–1956)
- Winifred Blackman (British, 1872–1950)
- C. Blankenberg-van Delden (Dutch, 1906–1994)
- Edward Bleiberg (American, born 1951)
- Martin Bommas (German, born 1967)
- Joseph Bonomi the Younger (British, 1796–1878)
- Charlotte Booth (British, born 1975)
- Ludwig Borchardt (German, 1863–1938)
- Käthe Bosse-Griffiths (German-British, 1910–1998)
- Urbain Bouriant (French, 1849–1903)
- Peter J. Brand (Canadian-American, born 1967)
- James Henry Breasted (American, 1865–1935)
- Edda Bresciani (Italian, 1930–2020)
- Bob Brier (American, born 1943)
- Edwin C. Brock (American, 1946–2015)
- Marianne Brocklehurst (English, 1832–1898)
- Mary Brodrick (British, 1858–1933)
- Myrtle Broome (British, 1888–1978)
- Gerald Michael Browne (American, 1943–2004)
- Émile Brugsch (German, 1842–1930)
- Heinrich Karl Brugsch (German, 1827–1894)
- Guy Brunton (English, 1878–1948)
- Betsy Bryan (American, born 1949)
- Janet May Buchanan (Scottish, 1866–1912)
- E. A. Wallis Budge (British, 1857–1934)
- Harry Burton (British, 1879–1940)
- James Burton (British, 1788–1862)

== C ==
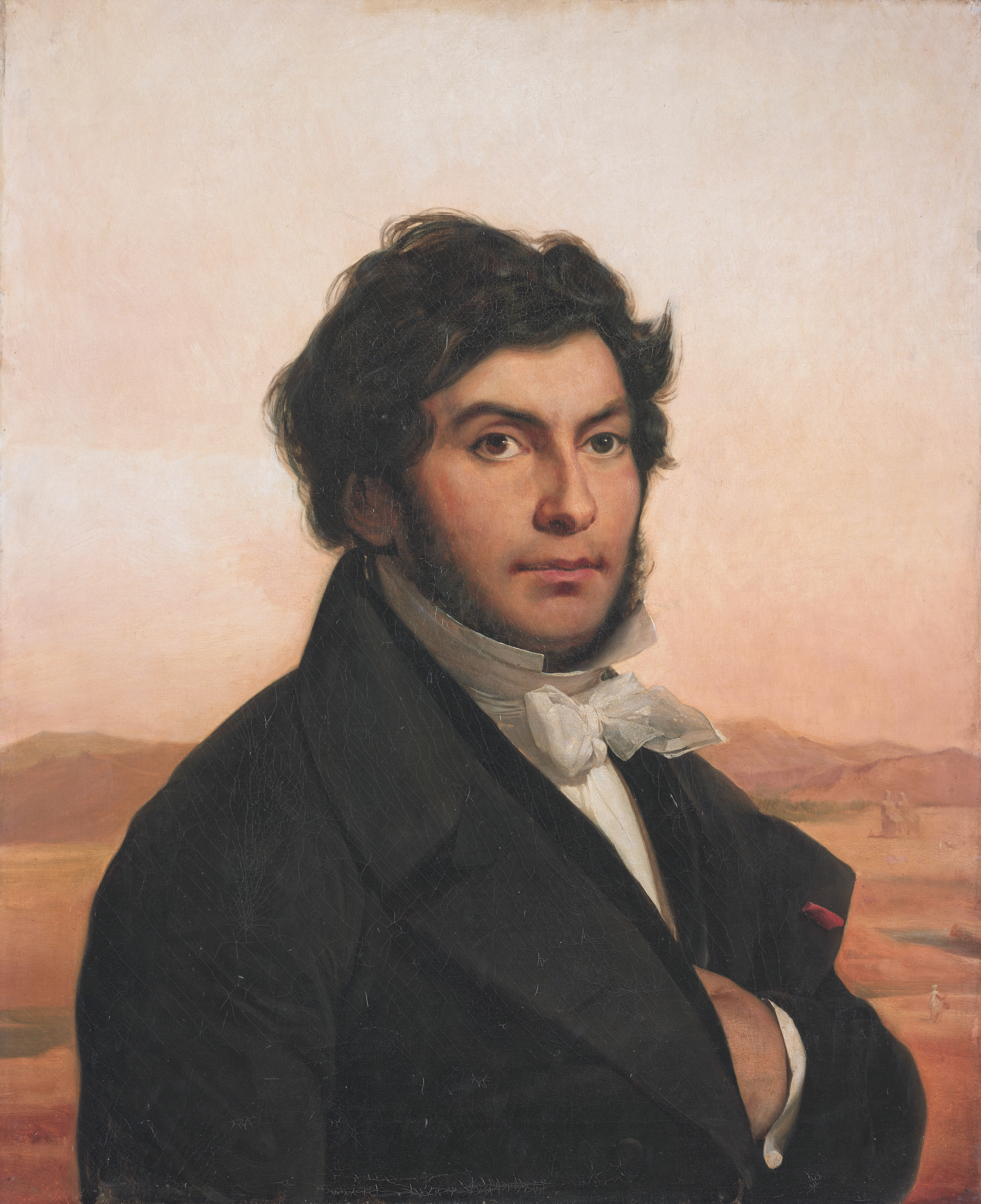
Jean-François Champollion

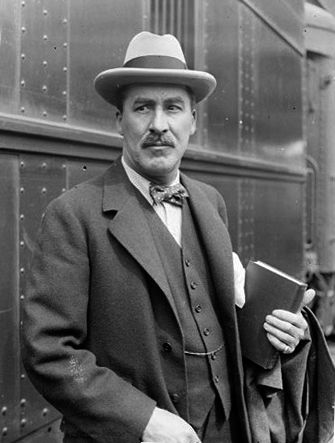
Howard Carter

- Agnès Cabrol (French, 1964–2007)
- Arthur Callender (British, 1875–1936)
- Amice Calverley (British-Canadian, 1896–1959)
- Ricardo Caminos (Argentinian, 1916–1992)
- Jean Capart (Belgian, 1877–1947)
- George Herbert, 5th Earl of Carnarvon (English, 1866–1923)
- Howard Carter (British, 1874–1939)
- Manfred Cassirer (German-born British, 1920–2003)
- Giovanni Battista Caviglia (Italian, 1770–1845)
- Jaroslav Černý (Czech, 1898–1970)
- François Chabas (French, 1817–1882)
- Edward Chaney (British, born 1951)
- Jean-François Champollion (French, 1790–1832)
- Émile Chassinat (French, 1868–1948)
- Charles Chipiez (French, 1835–1901)
- Somers Clarke (English, 1841–1926)
- Jean Clédat (French, 1871–1943)
- Eric H. Cline (American, born 1960)
- Walter E. H. Cockle (British, 1939–2018)
- Kara Cooney (American)
- Jean-Pierre Corteggiani (French, 1942–2022)
- Pearce Paul Creasman (American, born 1981)
- Gwendolen Crewdson (British, 1872–1913)
- Winifred M. Crompton (British, 1870–1932)
- Eugene Cruz-Uribe (American, 1952–2018)
- Silvio Curto (Italian, 1919–2015)

== D ==
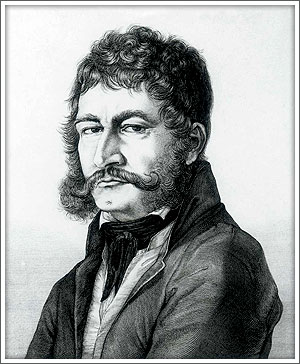
Bernardino Drovetti

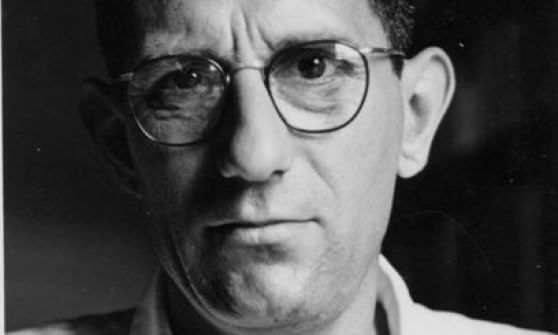
Sergio Donadoni

- Alec Naylor Dakin (English, 1912–2003)
- Alicia Daneri (Argentine, born 1942)
- Georges Daressy (French, 1864–1938)
- François Daumas (French, 1918–1984)
- Ann Rosalie David (British, born 1946)
- Warren Royal Dawson (English, 1888–1968)
- Madeleine Dellamonica (French, born 1912)
- Françoise Dunand (French, born 1934)
- Colleen Darnell (American, born 1980)
- John Coleman Darnell (American, born 1962)
- Nina de Garis Davies (American, 1881–1965)
- Norman de Garis Davies (American, 1865–1941)
- Theodore M. Davis (American, 1837–1915)
- Vivant Denon (French, 1747–1825)
- Théodule Devéria (French, 1831–1871)
- Carl E. DeVries (American, 1921–2010)
- Jacobus Van Dijk (Dutch, born 1953)
- Waynman Dixon (British, 1844–1930)
- Aidan Dodson (English, born 1962)
- Sergio Donadoni (Italian, 1914–2015)
- Peter Dorman (American, born 1948)
- Günter Dreyer (German, 1943–2019)
- Étienne Drioton (French, 1889–1961)
- Bernardino Drovetti (Italian, 1776–1852)
- Margaret Stefana Drower (British, 1911–2012)
- Johannes Dümichen (German, 1833–1894)
- Dows Dunham (American, 1890–1984)

== E ==
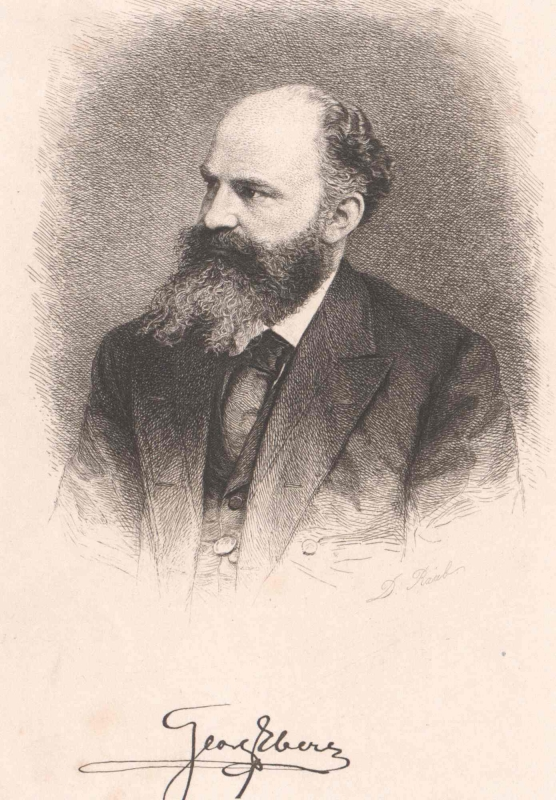
Georg Ebers

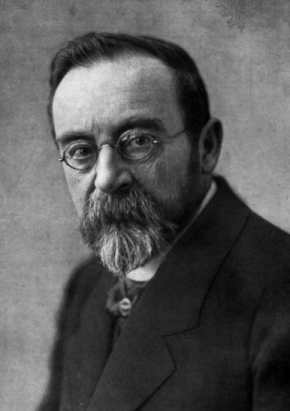
Adolf Erman

- Bendix Ebbell (Norwegian, 1865–1941)
- Georg Ebers (German, 1837–1898)
- Dorothy Eady (English, 1904–1981)
- Penelope Eames (British)
- Campbell Cowan Edgar (British, 1870–1938)
- Amelia Edwards (British, 1831–1892)
- I. E. S. Edwards (British, 1909–1996)
- August Eisenlohr (German, 1832–1902)
- Walter Bryan Emery (British, 1903–1971)
- Édouard Empain (Belgian, 1852–1929)
- Jean-Yves Empereur (French, born 1952)
- Reginald Engelbach (British, 1888–1946)
- Adolf Erman (German, 1854–1937)
- Hugh Evelyn-White (English, 1884–1924)

== F ==
- Herbert Walter Fairman (British, 1907–1982)
- Giulio Farina (Italian, 1889–1947)
- Raymond O. Faulkner (British 1894–1982)
- Cecil Mallaby Firth (British, 1878–1931)
- Henry George Fischer (American, 1923–2006)
- Hans-Werner Fischer-Elfert (German, born 1954)
- Joann Fletcher (British, born 1966)
- Georges Foucart (French, 1865–1943)
- Detlef Franke (German, 1952–2007)
- Henri Frankfort (Dutch, 1897–1954)
- Henning Franzmeier (German)
- George Willoughby Fraser (British, 1866–1923)
- Renée Friedman (American)
- Elizabeth Frood (New Zealander, born 1975)
- Perla Fuscaldo (Argentinian, born 1941)

== G ==
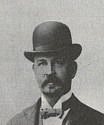
Vladimir Golenishchev

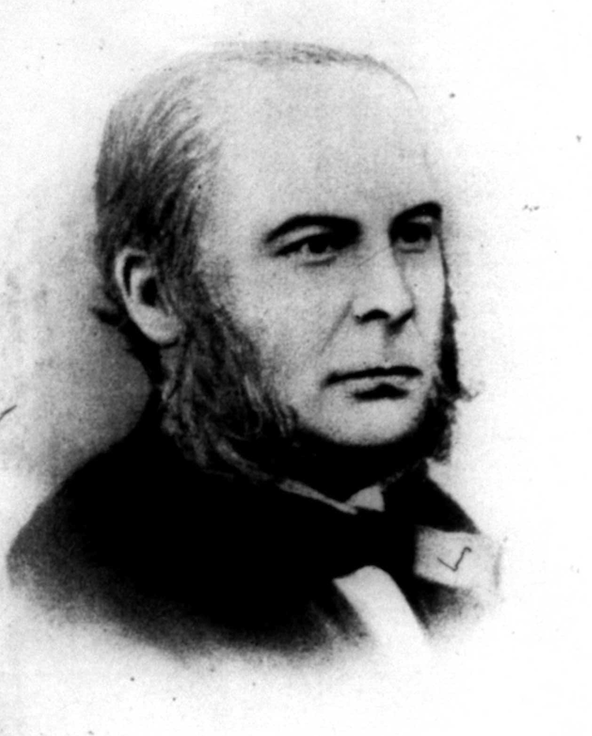
Charles Wycliffe Goodwin

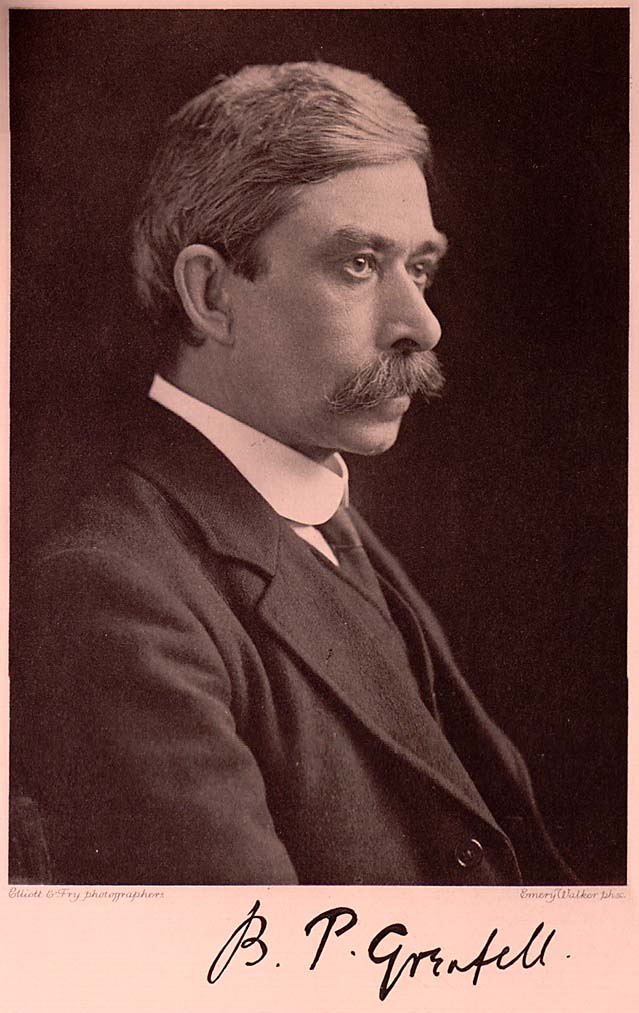
Bernard Pyne Grenfell

- Marc Gabolde (French, born 1957)
- Alan Gardiner (British, 1879–1963)
- Jean Sainte-Fare Garnot (French, 1908–1963)
- John Garstang (British, 1876–1956)
- Henri Gauthier (French, 1877–1950)
- Joseph Étienne Gautier (French, 1861–1924)
- John Gee (American, born 1964)
- Paul Ghalioungui (Egyptian, 1908–1987)
- Stephen Glanville (British 1900–1956)
- George Gliddon (American, 1809–1857)
- Orly Goldwasser (Israeli)
- Vladimir Golenishchev (Russian, 1856–1947)
- Zakaria Goneim (Egyptian, 1905–1959)
- Charles Wycliffe Goodwin (English, 1817–1878)
- Janet Gourlay (Scottish, 1863–1912)
- Georges Goyon (French, 1905–1996)
- Pierre Grandet (French, born 1954)
- Hermann Grapow (German, 1885–1967)
- Eugène Grébaut (French, 1846–1915)
- Frederick W. Green (English, 1869–1949)
- Leslie Greener (Australian, 1900–1974)
- Robert Greg (British, 1876–1953)
- Alice Grenfell (British, 1842–1917)
- Bernard Pyne Grenfell (British, 1869–1926)
- Francis Llewellyn Griffith (British, 1862–1934)
- Kate Bradbury Griffith (British, 1854–1902)
- Nora Griffith (British, 1870–1937)
- J. Gwyn Griffiths (Welsh, 1911–2004)
- C. Wilfred Griggs (American, born 1942)
- Nicolas Grimal (French, born 1948)
- Sarah Israelit Groll (Israeli, 1925–2007)
- Battiscombe Gunn (English, 1883–1950)
- P. L. O. Guy (British, 1885–1952)

== H ==
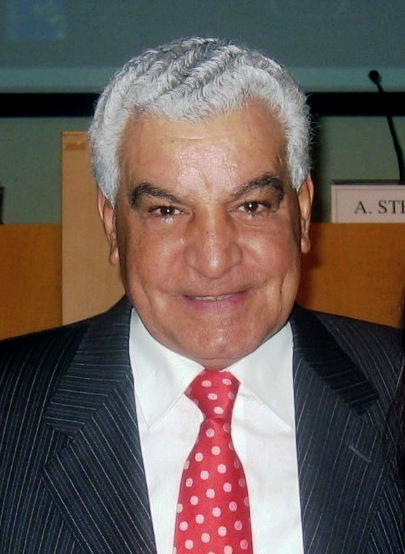
Zahi Hawass

- Labib Habachi (Egyptian, 1906–1984)
- Henry Reginald Hall (English, 1873–1930)
- Freda Hansard (English, 1872–1937)
- Ann Ellis Hanson (American)
- George Francis Hardy (English, 1855–1940)
- Tom Hare (American, born 1952)
- Anthony Charles Harris (British, 1790–1869)
- Geraldine Harris (British,born 1951)
- George Hart (British, 1945–2021)
- Hermine Hartleben (German, 1846–1918)
- Selim Hassan (Egyptian, 1887–1961)
- Brian M. Hauglid (American, born 1954)
- Zahi Hawass (Egyptian, born 1947)
- Robert Hay (Scottish, 1799–1863)
- William C. Hayes (American, 1903–1963)
- Dunbar Isidore Heath (English, 1816–1888)
- Heinz Heinen (Belgian, 1941–2013)
- Wolfgang Helck (German, 1914–1993)
- Johann Jakob Hess (Swiss, 1866–1949)
- Michael A. Hoffman (American, 1944–1990)
- James K. Hoffmeier (American, born 1951)
- Erik Hornung (German, 1933–2022)
- Arthur Surridge Hunt (British, 1871–1934)
- Elinor Mullett Husselman (American, 1900–1966)

== I ==
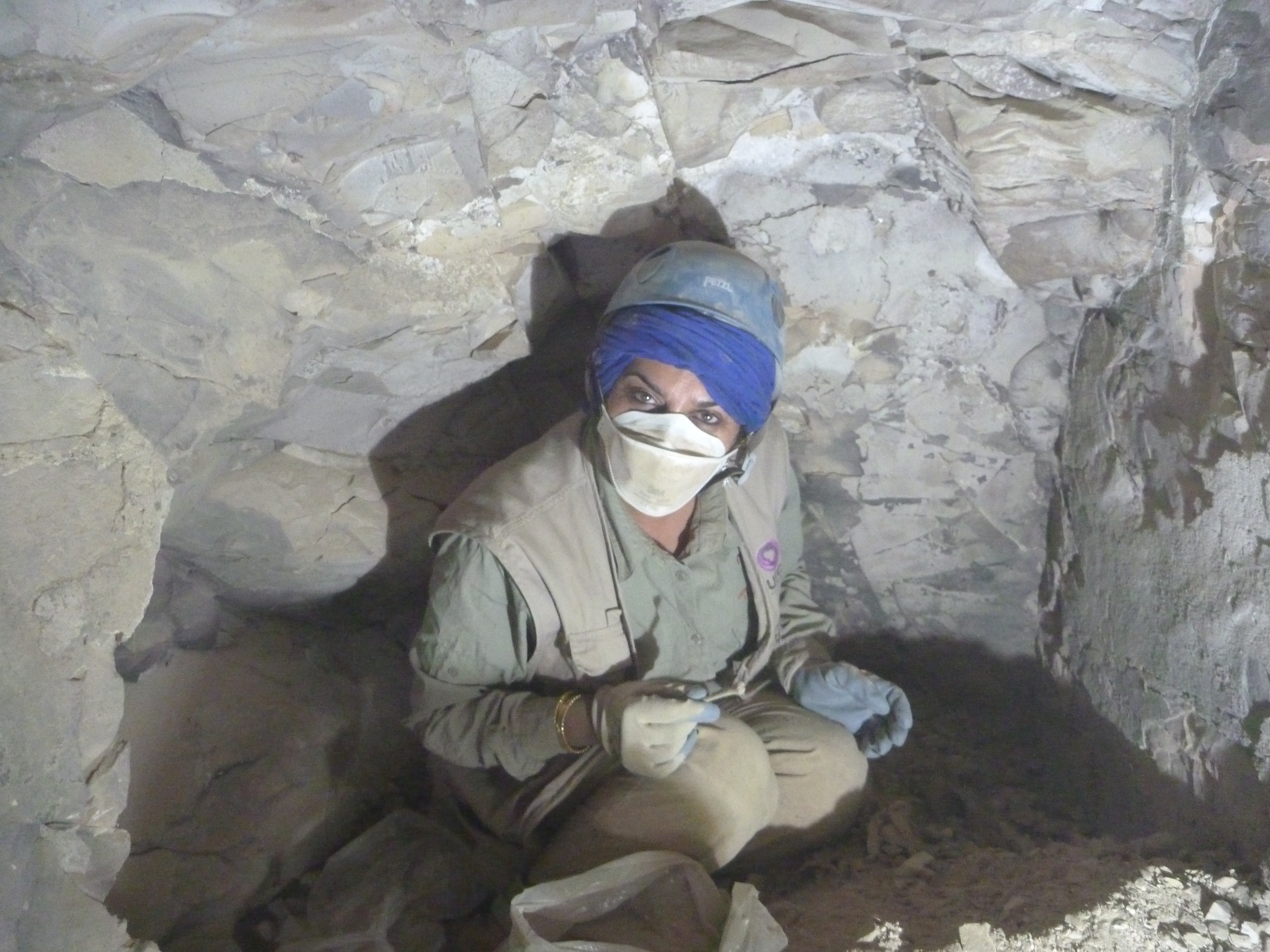
Salima Ikram

- Sergei Ignatov (Bulgarian, born 1960)
- Salima Ikram (Pakistani, born 1965)
- Martin Isler (American, 1926–2013)

== J ==
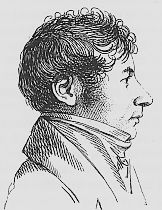
Edme-François Jomard

- Christian Jacq (French, born 1947)
- Helen Jacquet-Gordon (American, 1918–2013)
- T. G. H. James (British, 1923–2009)
- Gustave Jéquier (Swiss, 1868–1946)
- Janet Helen Johnson (American, born 1944)
- Kevin L. Johnson (American, born 1978)
- Jean-Baptiste Prosper Jollois (French, 1776–1842)
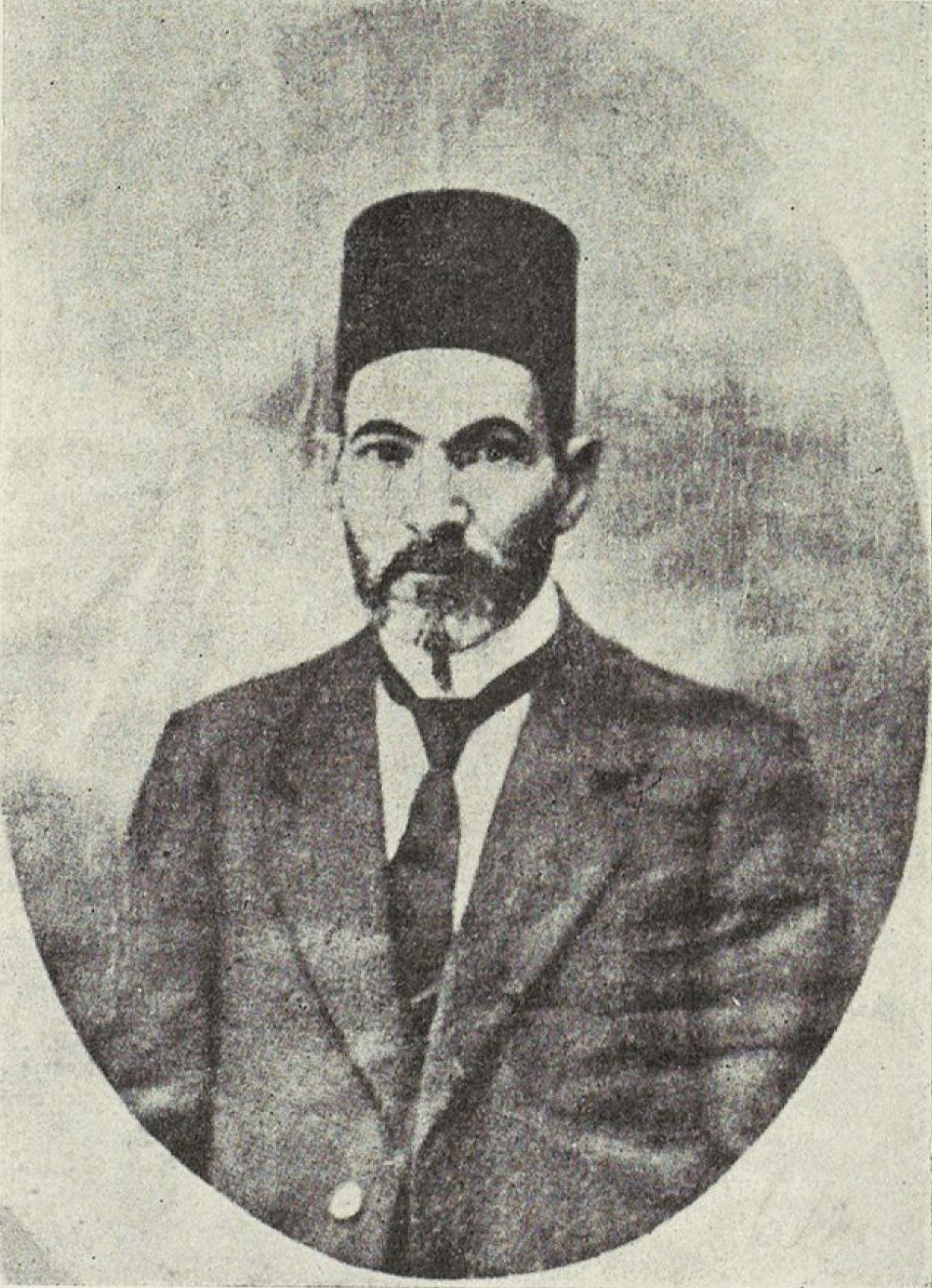
  Ahmed Kamal, the first Egyptian Egyptologist
- Edme-François Jomard (French, 1777–1862)
- E. Harold Jones (British, 1877–1911)
- Pierre Jouguet (French, 1869–1949)
- Hermann Junker (German, 1877–1962)

== K ==
- László Kákosy (Hungarian, 1932–2003)
- Ahmed Kamal (Egyptian, 1851–1923)
- Naguib Kanawati (Egyptian-Australian, born 1941)
- Peter Kaplony (Hungarian-Swiss, 1933–2011)
- Barry Kemp (British, 1940–2024)
- Jean Kérisel (French, 1908–2005)
- Jacques Kinnaer (Belgian, born 1966)
- Athanasius Kircher (German, 1602–1680)
- Kenneth Kitchen (British, 1932–2025)
- Giovanni Kminek-Szedlo (Czech-Italian, 1828–1896)
- Ludwig Koenen (American, 1931–2023)
- Jiro Kondo (Japanese, born 1951)
- Charles Kuentz (French, 1895–1978)

== L ==
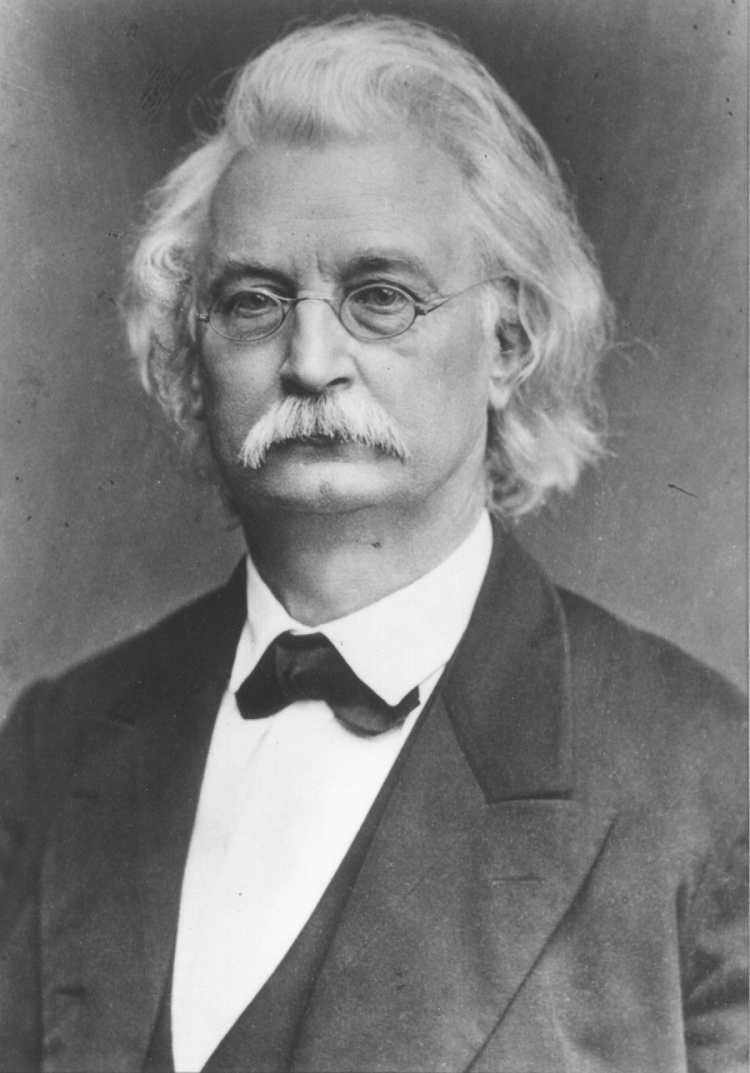
Karl Richard Lepsius

- Pierre Lacau (French, 1873–1963)
- Violette Lafleur (Canadian, 1897–1965)
- Claire Lalouette (French, 1921–2010)
- Stanley Lane-Poole (British, 1854–1931)
- Jean-Philippe Lauer (French, 1902–2001)
- Jean Leclant (French, 1920–2011)
- Conradus Leemans (Dutch, 1809–1893)
- Eugène Lefébure (French, 1838–1908)
- Gustave Lefebvre (French, 1879–1957)
- Georges Legrain (French, 1865–1917)
- Mark Lehner (American, born 1950)
- Oscar Lemm (Russian, 1856–1918)
- Charles Lenormant (French, 1802–1859)
- Karl Richard Lepsius (German, 1810–1884)
- Leonard H. Lesko (American, born 1938)
- Naphtali Lewis (American, 1911–2005)
- František Lexa (Czech, 1876–1960)
- Nestor L'Hôte (French, 1804–1842)
- Miriam Lichtheim (Israeli, 1914–2004)
- Jadwiga Lipińska (Polish, 1932–2009)
- Jens Lieblein (Norwegian, 1827–1911)
- Richard Lobban (American, born 1943)
- Edgar Lobel (British, 1888–1982)
- Victor Loret (French, 1859–1946)
- David Lorton (American)
- Alfred Lucas (English, 1867–1945)
- Adam Łukaszewicz (Polish, born 1950)
- Albert Lythgoe (American, 1868–1934)

== M ==
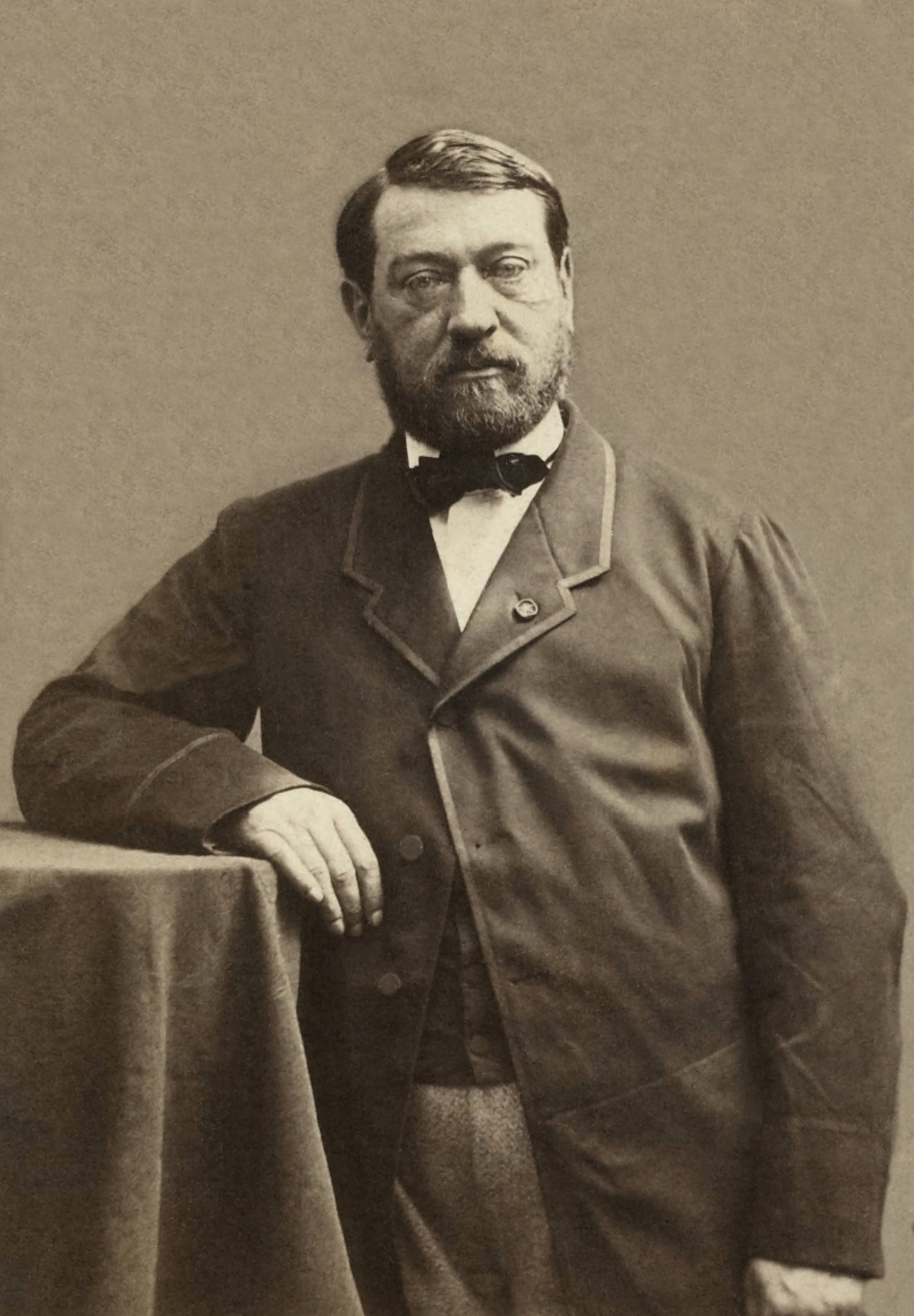
Auguste Mariette

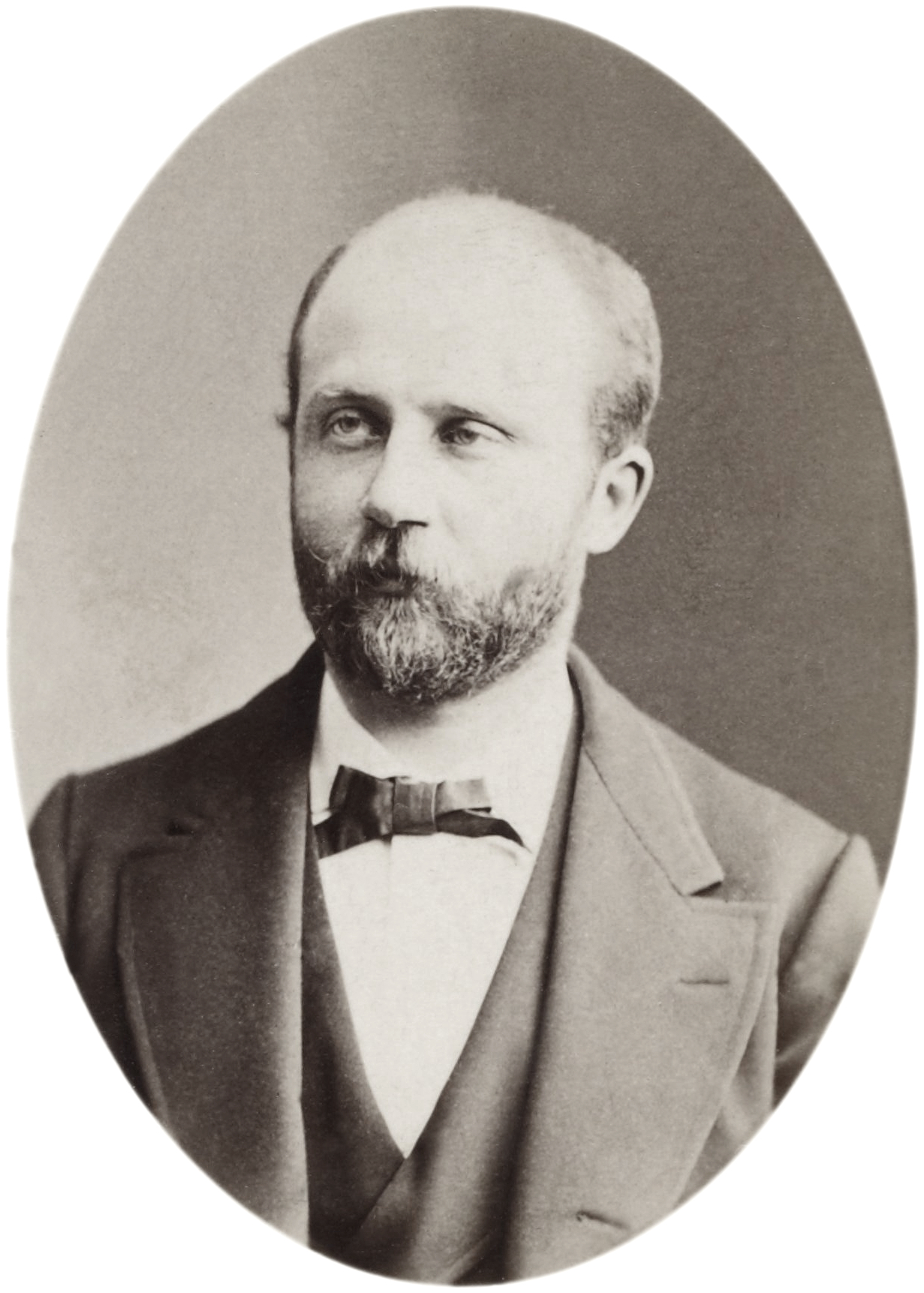
Gaston Maspero

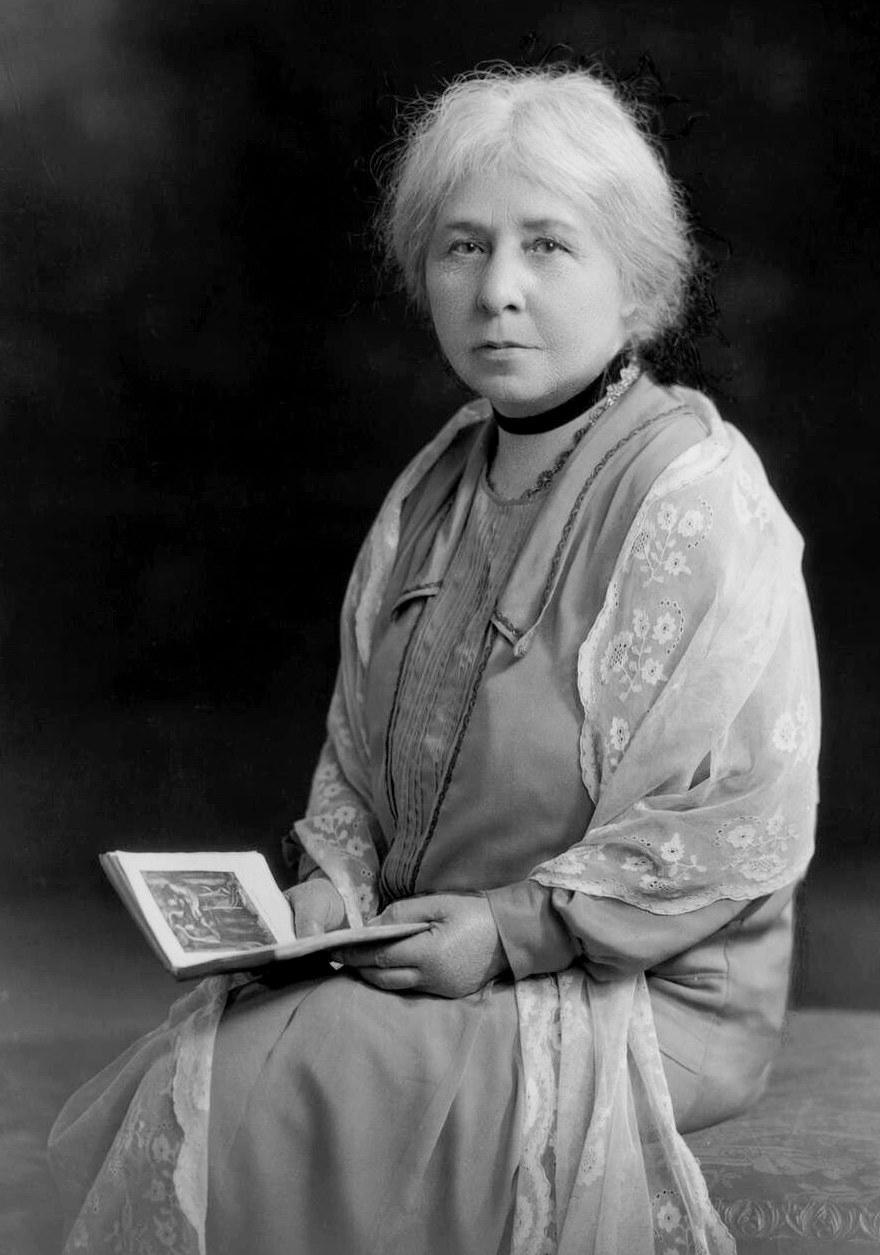
Margaret Murray

- Arthur Cruttenden Mace (British, 1874–1928)
- Christine El Mahdy (English, 1950–2008)
- Joseph Manning (American, born 1959)
- Auguste Mariette (French, 1821–1881)
- Geoffrey Thorndike Martin (British, 1934–2022)
- Gaston Maspero (French, 1846–1916)
- Ian Mathieson (Scottish, 1927–2010)
- Bernard Mathieu (French, born 1959)
- Edward Y. McCauley (American, 1827–1894)
- Andrea G. McDowell (American)
- Bernadette Menu (French, 1938–2023)
- Barbara Mertz (American, 1927–2013)
- Kazimierz Michałowski (Polish, 1901–1981)
- Béatrix Midant-Reynes (French)
- Nicholas Millet (American, 1934–2004)
- James O. Mills (American)
- Charles Edward Moldenke ( American, 1860–1935)
- Robert Mond (British, 1867–1938)
- Dominic Montserrat (British, 1964–2004)
- Pierre Montet (French, 1885–1966)
- Ludwig David Morenz (German, born 1965)
- Alexandre Moret (French, 1868–1938)
- Jacques de Morgan (French, 1857–1924)
- Robert Morkot (British, 1957–2025)
- Anna Anderson Morton (British, 1867–1961)
- Jennifer Sheridan Moss (American)
- Rosalind Moss (British, 1890–1990)
- Margaret Mountford (British, born 1951)
- Tycho Q. Mrsich (German, 1925–2022)
- Wilhelm Max Müller (German born American, 1862–1919)
- William J. Murnane (American, 1945–2000)
- Margaret Murray (Anglo-Indian, 1863–1963)
- Karol Myśliwiec (Polish, born 1943)

== N ==
- Chris Naunton (British)
- Édouard Naville (Swiss, 1844–1926)
- Percy Newberry (English, 1869–1949)
- Alessandra Nibbi (Australian, 1923–2007)
- Andrzej Niwiński, (Polish, born 1948)
- Christiane Desroches Noblecourt (French, 1913–2011)

== O ==
- Dirk Obbink (American, born 1957)
- Claude Obsomer (Belgian, born 1963)
- Elisabeth R. O'Connell (American)
- David O'Connor (Australian, 1938–2022)
- Boyo Ockinga (German-Australian)

== P ==
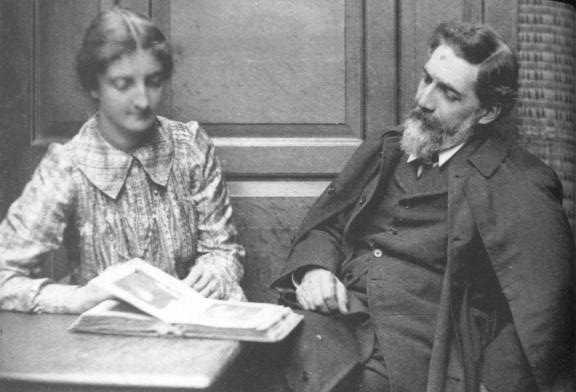
Hilda and Flinders Petrie

- Laure Pantalacci (French)
- Sarah Parcak (American)
- Richard Anthony Parker (American, 1905–1993)
- Richard B. Parkinson (British, born 1963)
- Peter J. Parsons (British, 1936–2022)
- Bob Partridge (British, died in 2011)
- Joan Crowfoot Payne (British, 1912–2002)
- T. Eric Peet (British, 1882–1934)
- Delia Pemberton (English, born 1954)
- John Pendlebury (British, 1904–1941)
- John Shae Perring (British, 1813–1869)
- Hilda Petrie (Irish, 1871–1957)
- Flinders Petrie (British, 1853–1942)
- Thomas Pettigrew (British, 1791–1865)
- Patrizia Piacentini (Italian, born 1961)
- Karl Piehl (Swedish, 1853–1904)
- Willem Pleyte (Dutch, 1836–1903)
- Jack Plumley (British, 1910–1999)
- André Pochan (French, 1891–1979)
- Daniel Polz (German, 1957–2025)
- Paule Posener-Kriéger (French, 1925–1996)
- Bertha Porter (British, 1852–1941)

== Q ==
- Joachim Friedrich Quack (German, born 1966)
- James Quibell (British, 1867–1935)
- Stephen Quirke (British)

== R ==
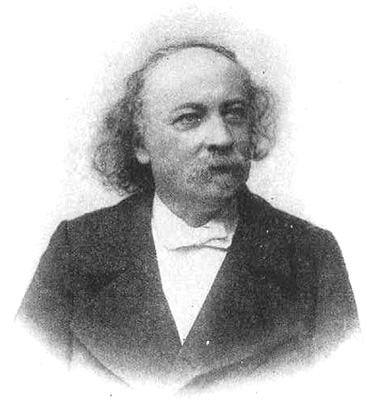
Eugène Revillout

- Anson Rainey (American, 1930–2011)
- Natacha Rambova (American, 1897–1966)
- David Randall-MacIver (British-American, 1873–1945)
- Dominic Rathbone (British)
- Maarten Raven (Dutch, born 1953)
- John D. Ray (British, born 1945)
- John Rea (British, 1933–2023)
- Donald B. Redford (Canadian, 1934–2024)
- Nicholas Reeves (English, born 1956)
- E. E. Rehmus (American, 1929–2004)
- Adolphe Reinach (French, 1887–1914)
- Leo Reinisch (Austrian, 1832–1919)
- George Andrew Reisner (American, 1867–1942)
- Peter le Page Renouf (English, 1822–1897)
- Eugène Revillout (French, 1843–1913)
- Alexander Henry Rhind (Scottish, 1833–1863)
- Michael D. Rhodes (American, born 1946)
- Janet Richards (American, born 1959)
- Herbert Ricke (German, 1901–1976)
- Christina Riggs (British American)
- Robert K. Ritner (American, 1953–2021)
- Colin Henderson Roberts (British, 1909–1990)
- David Roberts (Scottish, 1796–1864)
- Gay Robins (British-American, born 1951)
- David Rohl (British, born 1950)
- John Romer (English, born 1941)
- Ippolito Rosellini (Italian, 1800–1843)
- Emmanuel de Rougé (French, 1811–1872)
- Alan Rowe (British, 1891–1968)
- François Michel de Rozière (French, 1775–1842)
- Otto Rubensohn (German, 1867–1964)
- Barbara Ruszczyc (Poland, 1928–2001)
- Donald P. Ryan (American, born 1957)
- Kim Ryholt (American-Danish, born 1970)

== S ==
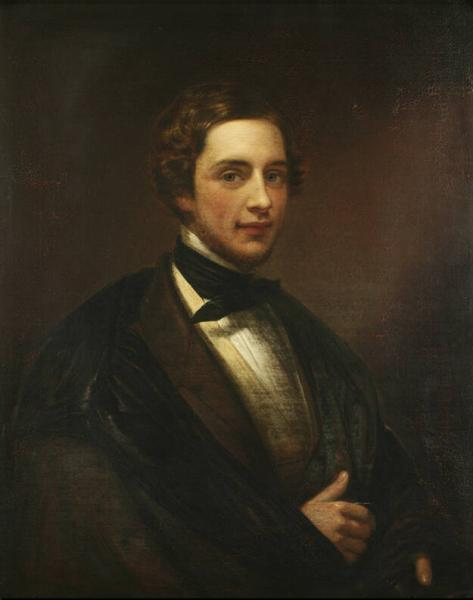
Edwin Smith

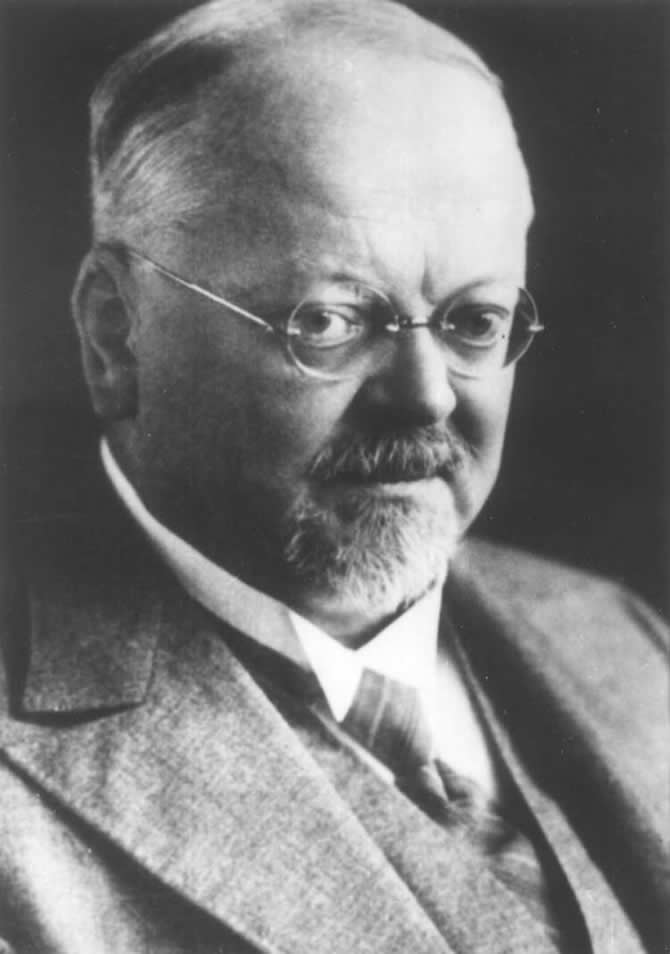
Kurt Sethe

- Henry Salt (English, 1780–1827)
- Helmut Satzinger (Austrian, born 1938)
- Serge Sauneron (French, 1927–1976)
- Claude-Étienne Savary (French, 1750–1788)
- Otto Schaden (American, 1937–2015)
- Hans Heinrich Schaeder (German, 1896–1957)
- Jean-Vincent Scheil (French, 1858–1940)
- Ernesto Schiaparelli (Italian, 1856–1928)
- Thonas Schneider (German, born 1964)
- R. A. Schwaller de Lubicz (French, 1887–1961)
- Nora E. Scott (American, 1905–1995)
- Girolamo Segato (Italian, 1792–1836)
- Kurt Sethe (German, 1869–1934)
- Gustav Seyffarth (German-American, 1796–1885)
- Samuel Sharpe (English, 1799–1881)
- Ian Shaw (British, born 1961)
- A. F. Shore (British, 1924–1994)
- David P. Silverman (American, born 1943)
- William Kelly Simpson (American, 1928–2017)
- Edwin Smith (American, 1822–1906)
- Grafton Elliot Smith (Australian, 1871–1937)
- Harry Smith (British, 1928–2024)
- Stuart Tyson Smith ( American, born 1960)
- Gorgi Sobhi (Egyptian, 1884–1964)
- Karin Sowada (Australian, born 1961)
- Wilhelm Spiegelberg (German, 1870–1930)
- Flaxman Charles John Spurrell (English, 1842–1915)
- Rainer Stadelmann (German, 1933–2019)
- Danijela Stefanović (Serbian, born 1973)
- Georg Steindorff (German, 1861–1951)
- Alice Stevenson (British)
- Sara Yorke Stevenson (American, 1847–1921)
- Vasily Struve (Russian, 1889–1965)
- Zbigniew Szafrański (Polish)
- Paul Sussman (English, 1966–2012)

== T ==
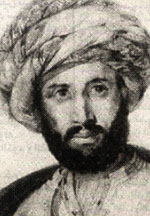
Rifa'a at-Tahtawi

- Mahmoud Maher Taha (Egyptian, born 1942)
- Rifa'a at-Tahtawi (Egyptian, 1801–1873)
- John W. Tait (British, born 1945)
- Emily Teeter (American, born 1953)
- Gertrud Thausing (Austrian, 1905–1997)
- Elizabeth Thomas (American, 1907–1986)
- J. David Thomas (British, 1931–2026)
- Henry Francis Herbert Thompson (British, 1859–1944)
- Claude Traunecker (French, born 1943)
- Bruce Trigger (Canadian, 1937–2006)
- Boris Turayev (Russian, 1868–1920)
- Eric Gardner Turner (British, 1911–1983)
- Joyce Tyldesley (British, born 1960)

== U ==
- Peter Ucko (British, 1938–2007)

== V ==
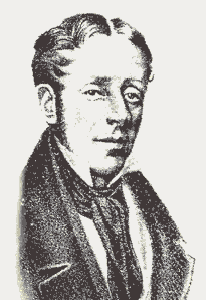
Howard Vyse

- Claude Vandersleyen (Belgian, 1927–2021)
- Jeanne Marie Thérèse Vandier d'Abbadie (French, 1899–1977)
- Alexandre Varille (French, 1909–1951)
- Luigi Vassalli (Italian, 1812–1887)
- Jean Vercoutter (French, 1911–2000)
- Jozef Vergote (Belgian, 1910–1992)
- Miroslav Verner (Czech, born 1941)
- Édouard de Villiers du Terrage (French, 1780–1855)
- Henry Villiers-Stuart (British, 1827–1895)
- Werner Vycichl (Austro-Hungarian, 1909–1999)
- Howard Vyse (British, 1784–1853)
- Hana Vymazalová (Czech, born 1978)

== W ==
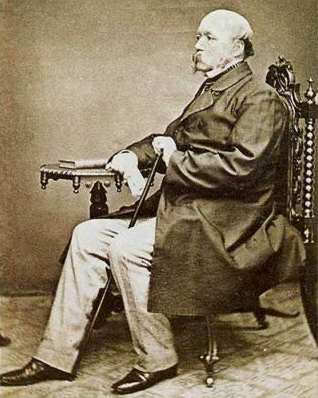
John Gardner Wilkinson

- Gerald Avery Wainwright (British, 1879–1964)
- William Ayres Ward (American, 1928–1996)
- Kent R. Weeks (American, born 1941)
- Arthur Weigall (British, 1880–1934)
- Josef W. Wegner (American, born 1967)
- Fred Wendorf (American, 1924–2015)
- Willeke Wendrich (Dutch-American, born 1961)
- Edward F. Wente (American, born 1930)
- Marcelle Werbrouck (Belgian, 1889–1959)
- Wolfhart Westendorf (German, 1924–2018)
- William Linn Westermann (American, 1873–1954)
- Charles Edwin Wilbour (American, 1833–1896)
- John Gardner Wilkinson (British, 1797–1875)
- Richard H. Wilkinson (American, born 1951)
- Toby Wilkinson (British, born 1969)
- Caroline Ransom Williams (American, 1872–1952)
- Hilary Wilson (British)
- John Albert Wilson (American, 1899–1976)
- Penelope Wilson (British)
- Herbert Eustis Winlock (American, 1884–1950)
- Ewa Wipszycka (Polish, born 1933)
- Walter Wreszinski (German, 1880–1935)

== Y ==
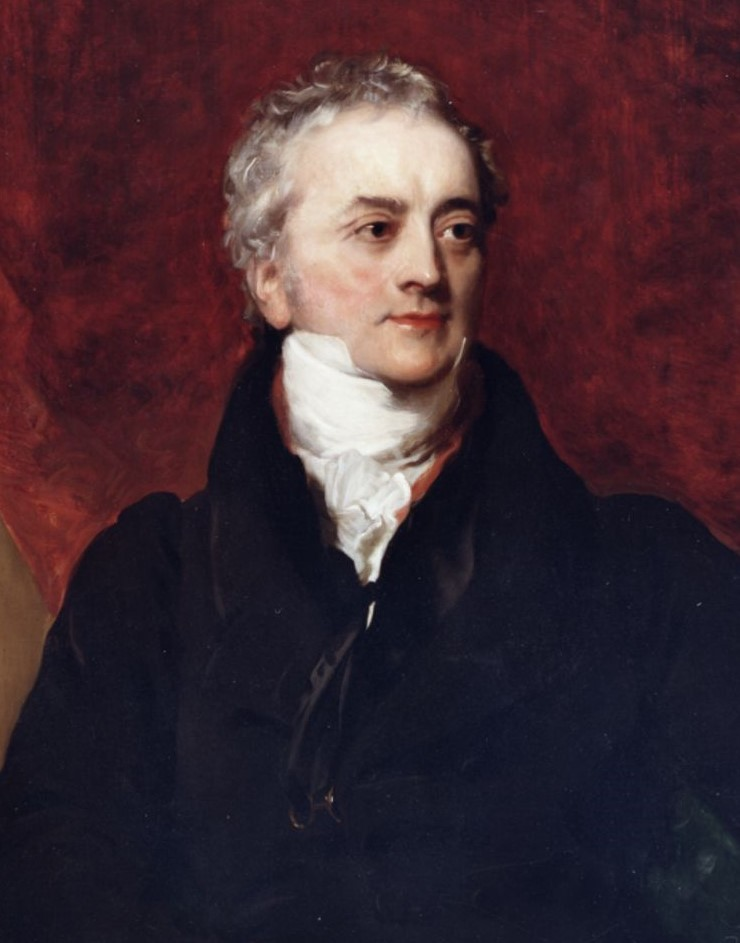
Thomas Young

- Sakuji Yoshimura (Japanese, born 1943)
- Thomas Young (British, 1773–1829)
- Herbert Youtie (American, 1904–1980)
- Louise Youtie (American, 1909–2004)
- Jean Yoyotte (French, 1927–2009)
- Frank J. Yurco (American, 1944–2004)

== Z ==
- Zbyněk Žába (Czech, 1917–1971)
- Louis Vico Žabkar (Italian-American, 1914–1994)
- Hilde Zaloscer (Austrian, 1903–1999)
- Christiane Ziegler (French, born 1942)

== Fictional Egyptologists ==
- Evelyn Carnahan (The Mummy)
- Lara Croft (Tomb Raider)
- Amelia Peabody-Emerson and the Emerson Family (Amelia Peabody series)
- Daniel Jackson (Stargate, Stargate SG-1)
- Indiana Jones (Raiders of the Lost Ark)
- Sarah Page (Primeval)
- Sophocles Sarcophagus (The Adventures of Tintin)

== See also ==
- List of female Egyptologists
