= List of female Egyptologists =

This is a list of female Egyptologists.

Image	Name	Nationality	Description	Birth	Death
	Barbara G. Adams	British		1945-02-19	2002-06-26
	Guillemette Andreu	French	Archaeologist	1948-08-03	
	Solange Ashby	American	Egyptologist, Nubiologist, Archaeologist		
	Elise Baumgartel	German		1892-10-05	1975-10-28
	Nathalie Beaux-Grimal	French		1960	
	Margaret Benson	British		1865-06-16	1916-05-13
	Svetlana Berzina	Soviet		1932-03-07	2012-04-24
	Susanne Bickel	French		1960	
	Danielle Bonneau	French	Historian	1912	1992-10-26
	Charlotte Booth	British	Archaeologist	1975-04-06	
	Käthe Bosse-Griffiths	Welsh-German	Curator	1910-06-16; 1910-07-16	1998-04-04
	Edda Bresciani	Italian	Archaeologist	1930-09-23	2020-11-29
	Lyla Pinch Brock	Canadian			
	Mary Brodrick	British	Archaeologist	1858	1933-07-13
	Winifred Brunton	British and South African	Artist	1880-05-06	1959-01-29
	Betsy Bryan	American		1949	
	Agnès Cabrol	French		1964-07-12	2007-01-07
	Amice Calverley	Canadian		1896-04-09	1959-04-10
	Kara Cooney	American		1972-03-08	
	Jeanne Marie Thérèse Vandier d'Abbadie	French		1899-09-26	1977-04-25
	Colleen Darnell	American		1980	
	Madeleine Dellamonica	French	Egyptologist	1912-07-23	
	María del Carmen Pérez Díe	Spanish	Curator and director	1953	
	Debborah Donnelly	Canadian	Egyptian archaeologist	1965	
	Margaret Stefana Drower	British		1911	2012
	Dorothy Eady	British Egyptian	(Amateur) Egyptologist	1904-01-16	1981-04-21
	Amelia Edwards	British	Novelist, journalist, traveller	1831-06-07	1892-04-15
	Joann Fletcher	British		1966-08-30	
	Renée Friedman	American	Egyptologist	1900s	
	Elizabeth Frood	New Zealand			
	Perla Fuscaldo	Argentinian		1941	
	Orly Goldwasser	Israeli		2000s	
	Janet Gourlay	British		1863-01-30	1912-03-03
	Kate Bradbury Griffith	British		1854-08-26	1902-03-02
	Nora Griffith	British		1870-12-07	1937-10-21
	Sarah Israelit Groll	Israeli		1925	2007
	Sonali Gupta	Indian			
	Geraldine Harris	British		1951	
	Hermine Hartleben	German		1846-06-02	1919-07-18
	Rexine Hummel	Canadian	Egyptologist, ceramicist	1937	
	Salima Ikram	Pakistani		1965	
	Sally Katary	Canadian	Egyptologist, professor	1946	2016
	Luise Klebs	German		1865-06-13	1931-05-24
	Violette Lafleur	Canadian		1897	1965
	Miriam Lichtheim	Israeli		1914-05-03	2004-03-27
	Christine El Mahdy	British		1950-05-31	2008-02-07
	Aurélia Masson-Berghoff	French			
	Barbara Mertz	American	Author	1927-09-29	2013-08-08
	Béatrix Midant-Reynes	French			
	Herta Mohr	Austrian, Dutch	Egyptologist	1914-04-24	1945-04-15
	Anna Anderson Morton	British		1876	1961
	Rosalind Moss	British		1890-09-21	1990-04-22
	Margaret Murray	British		1863-07-13	1963-11-13
	Alessandra Nibbi	Italian	Archaeologist	1923-06-30	2007-01-15
	Christiane Desroches Noblecourt	French		1913-11-17	2011-06-23
	Laure Pantalacci	French	Historian		
	Sarah Parcak	American			
	Delia Pemberton	British		1954	
	Hilda Petrie	British		1871-06-08	1956-11-23
	Bertha Porter	British		1852	1941
	Paule Posener-Kriéger	French		1925-04-18	1996-05-11
	Janet Richards	American		1959	
	Nora E. Scott	American		1905-07-14	1994-04-04
	Natalya Yevgenevna Semper	Russian		1911-08-23	1995-10-29
	Danijela Stefanović	Serbian			
	Sara Yorke Stevenson	American	Archaeologist	1847-02-19	1921-11-14
	Gertrud Thausing	Austrian	Head of the Institute for Egyptology and African Studies at the University of Vienna	1905-12-27	1997-05-06
	Elizabeth Thomas	American		1907-03-29	1986-11-28
	Joyce Tyldesley	British		Archaeologist	1960-02-25
	Hana Vymazalová	Czech		1978	
	Willeke Wendrich	American		1961-09-13	
	Marcelle Werbrouck	Belgian		1889-05-23	1959-08-01
	Penelope Wilson	British			
	Hilde Zaloscer	Austrian	Coptologist	1903	1999
	Christiane Ziegler	French		1942-05-03	
	Patrizia Piacentini	Italian		1961	
	Emily Teeter	American		1953	

== See also ==
- List of Egyptologists
- Lists of women
