= August Eisenlohr =

German Egyptologist (1832–1902)

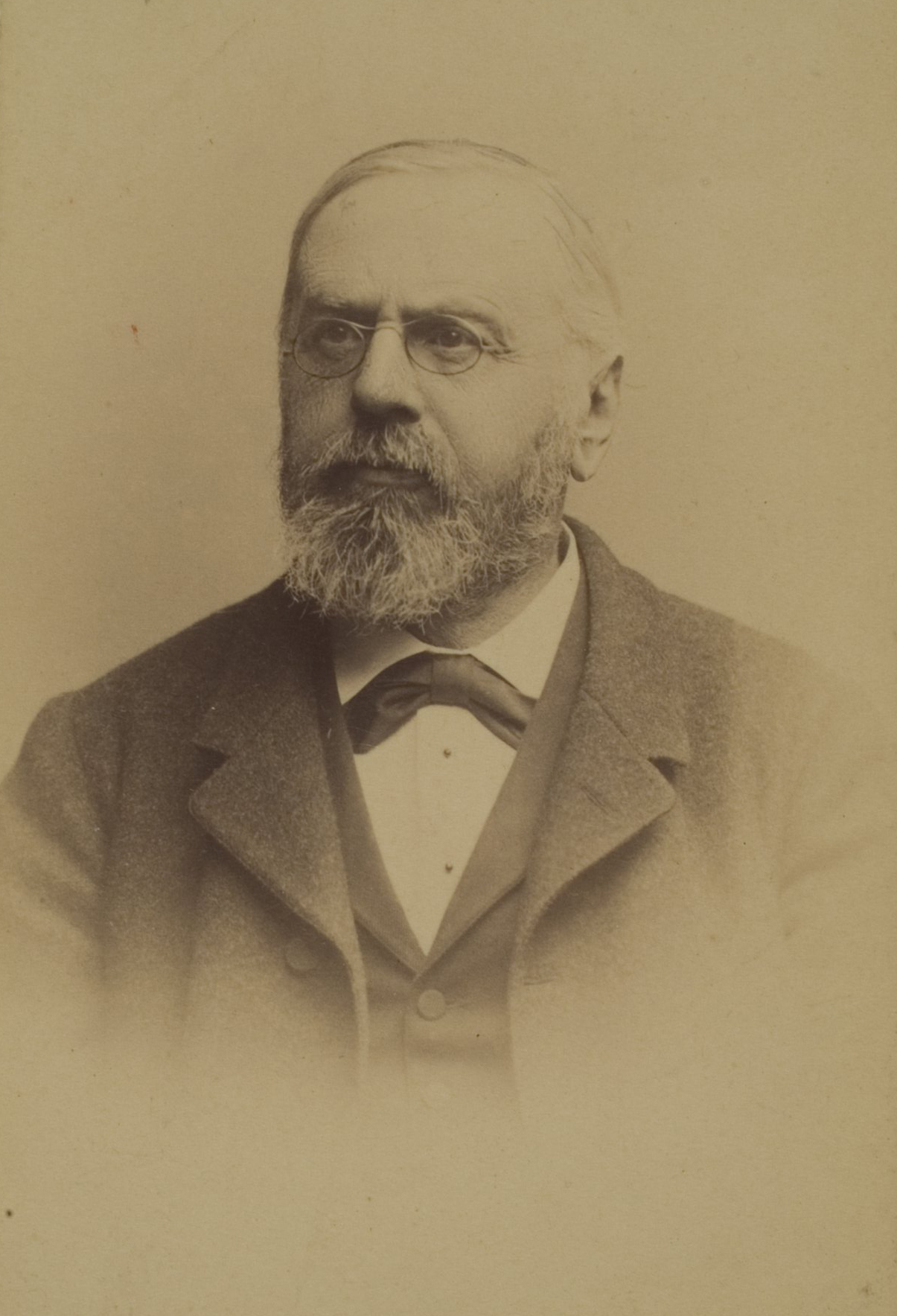
August Eisenlohr

August Adolf Eisenlohr (6 October 1832, Mannheim – 24 February 1902, Heidelberg) was a German Egyptologist.

He studied theology and sciences at the universities of Heidelberg and Göttingen, and spent several years involved in the chemical manufacturing business. In 1862 he introduced a process for producing aniline blue. In 1865 he resumed his education, taking classes in Egyptian language studies. In 1869 he received his habilitation for Egyptology at Heidelberg and in 1869/70 conducted research in Egypt. In 1885 he became an honorary professor at the University of Heidelberg, where he taught classes in Egyptian archaeology and Semitic languages.

In 1877 he was the first to publish an edition of the Rhind Mathematical Papyrus, considered to be the most important mathematical text discovered in Egypt.

== Published works ==
- Analytische Erklärung des demotischen Theiles der Rosettana Z. 1–8, 1869 (habilitation thesis) – Analytical explanation of the Demotic part of Tabula Rosettana, lines 1-8.
- Der große Papyrus Harris : Ein wichtiger Beitrag zur ägyptischen Geschichte, ein 3000 Jahr altes Zeugniß für die mosaische Religionsstiftung enthaltend, 1872 – The Harris Papyrus: an important contribution to Egyptian history.
- Ein mathematisches Handbuch der alten Aegypter : (Papyrus Rhind des British Museum), 1877 – A mathematical handbook of the ancient Egyptians: (Rhind papyrus of the British Museum).
- Corpus papyrorum Aegypti a Revillout et Eisenlohr editum, 1885-1892 (with Eugène Revillout).
- Ein altbabylonischer Felderplan nach Mittheilungen von F. V. Scheil, 1896 (as editor) – An Old Babylonian field plan according to Father Jean-Vincent Scheil.
