= Eugene Cruz-Uribe =

American Egyptologist and professor of History

- Born: December 22, 1952; Green Bay, Wisconsin
- Died: March 12, 2018 (aged 65); Indianapolis, Indiana
- Scientific career
- Fields: Egyptology
- Institutions: Indiana University East

Eugene Cruz-Uribe was an American Egyptologist. He focused particularly on later stages of Ancient Egyptian history, such as the Late Period and the Graeco-Roman era. He had a particular interest in Demotic texts.

== Early life and education ==
Cruz-Uribe received his BA and PhD, both in Egyptology, from the Department of Near Eastern Languages and Civilizations at the University of Chicago.

Cruz-Uribe trained under Janet Johnson and others at IU East. He also served as the project Egyptologist for the Treasures of Tutankhamun exhibits in Seattle and New York.

== Career ==
- Professor of Global History and World Civilizations, California State University - Monterey Bay, 2011–2013
- Professor Emeritus, Department of History, Northern Arizona University, 2007–present
- Assistant / Associate Dean, College of Social and Behavioral Sciences, Northern Arizona University, 1989–1998
- Assistant Professor of Egyptology, Brown University, 1983–1988
- Editor, Journal of the American Research Center in Egypt, from July 2008
- Editor, Journal of the Society for the Study of Egyptian Antiquities (Toronto), 1998–2007

== Death ==
Cruz-Uribe died on March 12, 2018, from injuries sustained in a bicycle accident.

== Legacy and influence ==
Many accounts describe Cruz-Uribe as well-liked. Once source describes reaction to his death as follows:

The news of his death spread very quickly, and the intense outpouring of spontaneous grief in the social media was dramatic and powerful. The response was nearly as startling as the news itself. What I found heart-warming was the number of people—friends, colleagues, and acquaintances—who expressed their sorrow and shared their heartache. I’ve never seen anything quite like it in 45 years of Egyptology. Just as amazing was the number of people who started wearing bow ties in his honor, many—myself included—who learned to tie them for the first time! Gene, of course, was known for the hand-tied bow ties that he always wore and for laughably touting their superiority to ordinary neckties. Six weeks after he died, many people wore bow ties or bow tie pins in his memory at the ARCE Annual Meeting in Tucson. Piccione 2018

== Major works ==
1. The Demotic Graffiti from the Temple of Isis on Philae Island (Atlanta, 2016)
2. Jitse H. F. Dijkstra and Eugene Cruz-Uribe, Syene I: The Figural and Textual Graffiti from the Temple of Isis at Aswan. Beiträge zur Ägyptischen Bauforschung und Altertumskunde Band 18 (Mainz: Philipp von Zabern, 2012).
3. Hibis Temple Project, Volume 3. Graffiti from the Temple Precinct. (San Antonio: Van Siclen Books, 2008)
4. The Archive of Tikas - Demotic Papyri from Philadelphia in the Fayum. Coauthored with C. Nims ┼ (Sommerhausen: G. Zauzich Verlag, in press).
5. “Computers and Journal Publishing,” in S. Polis and J. Winand, eds., Texts, Languages & Information Technology in Egyptology, Liege, 2013, pages 169–174.
6. “Seth, God of Power and Might,” Journal of the American Research Center in Egypt 45 (2009), pages 201–226.
7. “Social Structure and Daily Life: Graeco-Roman,” in A. Lloyd, ed., A Companion to Ancient Egypt, Blackwells Companions to the Ancient World (Oxford, 2010), pages 491–506.
8. “The Death of Demotic Redux: Pilgrimage, Nubia and the Preservation of Egyptian Culture,” in H. Knuf, et al., eds., Honi Soit Qui Mal Y Pense (Fs Thissen) (Leuven, 2010), pages 499–506.

== Bibliography ==
- Cruz-Uribe, E. (2016). The Demotic Graffiti from the Temple of Isis on Philae Island. Material and Visual Culture of Ancient Egypt. Lockwood Press. ISBN 978-1-937040-48-2.
- "Faculty Profiles - Faculty & Staff - Indiana University East". 2017-08-10. Archived from the original on 2017-08-10.
- Cruz-Uribe, Eugene (1985). Saite And Persian Demotic Cattle Documents.
- Cartee, Hali. "Cruz-Uribes endow $100,000 scholarship for IU East students | News at IU East".
- "'Egypt Guy' awarded Fulbright grant – The NAU Review" (Blog). NAU Review.
- Cruz-Uribe, Eugene (2009). "Stḫ ꜥꜣ pḥty "Seth, God of Power and Might"". Journal of the American Research Center in Egypt. 45: 201–226. ISSN 0065-9991. JSTOR 25735454.
- Cruz-Uribe, Eugene (1994). "The Khonsu Cosmogony". Journal of the American Research Center in Egypt. 31: 169–189. doi:10.2307/40000676. ISSN 0065-9991. JSTOR 40000676.
- Cruz-Uribe, Eugene (1978). "The Father of Ramses I: OI 11456". Journal of Near Eastern Studies. 37 (3): 237–244. ISSN 0022-2968. JSTOR 544684.
- Cruz-Uribe, Eugene (1980). "A Sale of Inherited Property from the Reign of Darius I". The Journal of Egyptian Archaeology. 66: 120–126. doi:10.2307/3856395. ISSN 0307-5133. JSTOR 3856395.
- Cruz-Uribe, Eugene (1994). "The Demotic Graffiti from Gebel Teir (Khargha Oasis)". Egitto e Vicino Oriente. 17: 79–86. ISSN 0392-6885. JSTOR 24233514.
- Cruz-Uribe, Eugene (1988). "A New Look at the Adoption Papyrus". The Journal of Egyptian Archaeology. 74: 220–223. doi:10.2307/3821764. ISSN 0307-5133. JSTOR 3821764.
- Cruz-Uribe, Eugene (2023). "The Birth of the King: Word Play in the Westcar Papyrus". In Kiser-Go, Deanna; Redmount, Carol A. (eds.). Weseretkau 'Mighty of Kas'. Papers Submitted in Memory of Cathleen A. Keller. Lockwood Press. pp. 287–294. ISBN 978-1-948488-85-3. JSTOR jj.1431188.28.
- Cruz-Uribe, Eugene (1989). "Oasis of the Spirit". Archaeology. 42 (5): 48–53. ISSN 0003-8113. JSTOR 41740337.
- Cruz-Uribe, Eugene (2008). "Hibis Temple Project Volume 3: The Graffiti from the Temple Precinct". San Antonio.
- Cruz-Uribe, Eugene; others. "The figural and textual graffiti from the temple of Isis at Aswan". (No Title).
- Piccione, Peter (2018-11-20). "Dedication: Eugene David Cruz-Uribe, Ph.D. December 22, 1952–March 12, 2018". Journal of the American Research Center in Egypt. 54: 5–16. ISSN 2330-1880 – via Academia.edu.
- Cruz-Uribe, Eugene (2023-12-18). "Index: The Archive of Tikas". Indiana University Digital Collections.

== See also ==
- Temple of Hibis
- Philae (Demotic inscriptions)
