= Zbigniew Szafrański =

Polish archeologist

Zbigniew E. Szafrański is a Polish Egyptologist.

== Life ==
Zbigniew Szafrański is the director of the Polish archeological mission to Egypt that has been working at Queen Hatshepsut's mortuary temple since 1961. He is known as the founder of the Polish school of Mediterranean Archaeology. He is a faculty member at the University of Warsaw, Department of History, and is deputy chief of the Mediterranean Archaeology Center. He has published numerous papers and writes on Egyptian history for popular magazines. He appeared as an expert on National Geographic's 2019 documentary program Lost Treasures of Egypt.

== See also ==
- List of Egyptologists
- List of Poles
