= Tadeusz Andrzejewski =

Polish archaeologist and Egyptologist

Tadeusz Andrzejewski (11 December 1923 – 28 June 1961) was a Polish archaeologist and Egyptologist.

== Life ==
Andrzejewski was born in Łódź. After leaving school, he joined the staff of the National Museum in Warsaw in the 1940s, and was appointed to a post in University of Warsaw, 1951.

In 1951 Tadeusz became secretary of the Polish Archaeological Mission in Cairo and 1959 he assisted Kazimierz Michałowski at the excavations at Mirmeki, 1956, then spent four years at Tell Atrib, (1957–1961) in the Nile Delta.

During his last year there he made an independent survey of many of the archaeological sites of the Delta and prepared a report on them; during the reconstruction work carried out by the Polish Archaeological Institute at the temple of Hatshepsut at Deir el-Bahari he was responsible for the epigraphic work.

The Egyptian Antiquities Service also appointed him to publish the tomb of Ramesses III, all the notes for this being almost completed at his death.

Andrzejewski also took part in the 1959 Polish expedition to Nubia and made the documentation survey of Faras. He published two books in French, 23 articles, a history of Ancient Egypt, a book on Egyptian poetry, a new commentary on Bolesław Prus' historical novel Pharaoh, Księga Umarłych piastunki Kai, and many others. Andrzejewski was extremely important in popularizing old Egyptian literature within Poland as well as the organization of the field of Egyptology in Poland.

== See also ==
- List of Poles
- List of Egyptologists
