= Eugène Revillout =

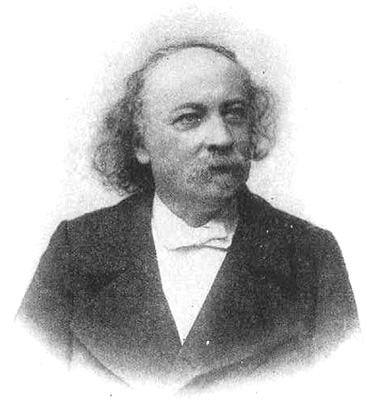
Eugène Revillout

Eugène Revillout (4 May 1843 – 11 January 1913) was a French Egyptologist.

Born in Besançon, Revillout worked for the Louvre in Paris, as both a curator for the collection and professor of Egyptian at its school. He dealt particularly with the youngest branches of the Egyptian language and literature, Demotic and Coptic. Revillout was among the first that dealt with the legal history of ancient Egypt. He died in 1913.

With Heinrich Karl Brugsch and François Chabas, he published the Revue égyptologique (inaugural issue 1880).

== Works ==
- Nouvelle chrestomathie démotique. Paris (1878)
- Chrestomathie démotique. Paris (1880)
- Le Roman de Setna. Paris (1880)
- Cours de langue démotique : un poème satirique. Paris (1884)
- Le procès d'Hermias : d'après les sources démotiques et des grecques. Paris (1884)
- Les obligations en droit égytien comparé aux autres droits de l'Antiquité. Paris (1887)
- Actes et contrats des musées égyptienne de Boulaq et du Louvre. Paris (1876)
- Le concile de Nicée d'après les textes coptes. Paris (1881)
- Lettres sur les monnaies égyptiennes. Paris (1895)
- Mélanges sur la métrologie, l'economie politique et l'histoire de l'ancienne égyptiennes. Paris (1896)
- Précis du droit égyptien. Paris (1902)
