= Demotic Egyptian script =

Ancient Egyptian script

Demotic
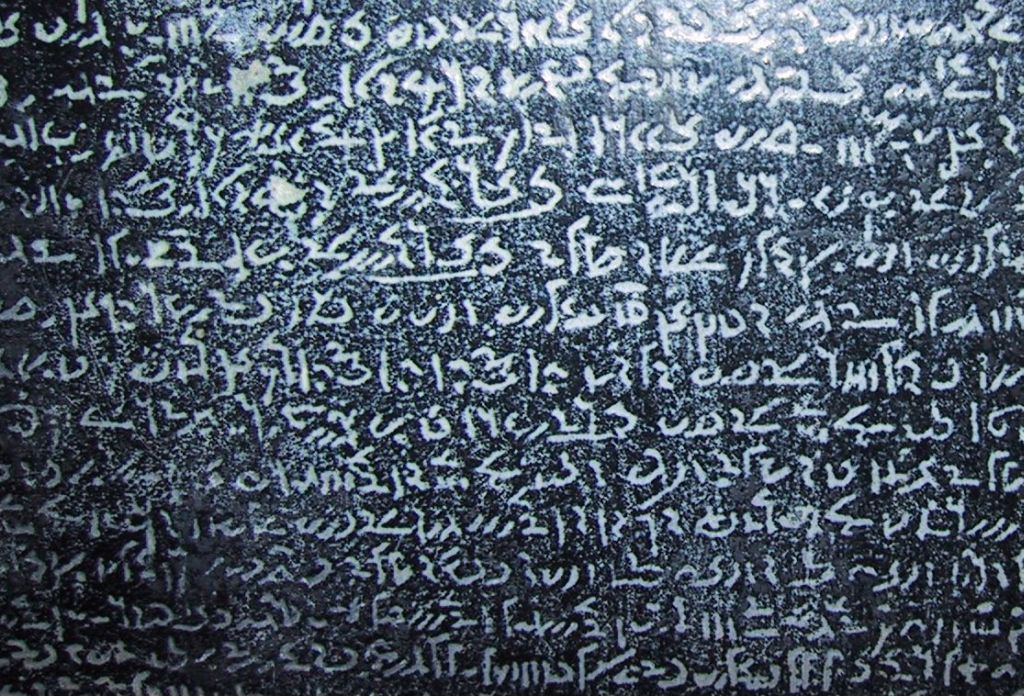
- Demotic script on a Rosetta Stone replica
- Script type: Logographic with consonants
- Period: c. 650 BC – 5th century AD
- Direction: Right-to-left
- Languages: Demotic

Related scripts
- Parent systems: Egyptian hieroglyphs: Hieratic; Demotic
- Child systems: Meroitic, Coptic (influenced)

ISO 15924
- ISO 15924: Egyd (070), Egyptian demotic

The Demotic Egyptian script (from Ancient Greek: δημοτικός dēmotikós, 'popular') was the script used by the ancient Egyptian language, derived from northern forms of hieratic used in the Nile Delta. The term was first used by the Greek historian Herodotus to distinguish it from hieratic and hieroglyphic scripts.

== Script ==
The Demotic script was referred to by the Egyptians as sš/sẖ n šꜥ.t 'document writing', which the 2nd century scholar Clement of Alexandria called ἐπιστολογραφική epistolographikḗ, 'letter-writing', while early Western scholars, notably Thomas Young, formerly referred to it as "Enchorial Egyptian". The script was used for more than a thousand years, and during that time a number of developmental stages occurred. It is written and read from right to left, while earlier hieroglyphs could be written from top to bottom, left to right, or right to left. Parts of the Demotic Greek Magical Papyri were written with a cypher script.

=== Early Demotic ===
Early Demotic (often referred to by the German term Frühdemotisch) developed in Lower Egypt during the later part of the Twenty-fifth Dynasty, particularly found on steles from the Serapeum of Saqqara. It is generally dated between 650 and 400 BC, as most texts written in Early Demotic are dated to the Twenty-sixth Dynasty and the subsequent rule as a satrapy of the Achaemenid Empire, which was known as the Twenty-seventh Dynasty. After the reunification of Egypt under Psamtik I, Demotic replaced Abnormal Hieratic in Upper Egypt, particularly during the reign of Amasis II, when it became the official administrative and legal script. During this period, Demotic was used only for administrative, legal, and commercial texts, while hieroglyphs and hieratic were reserved for religious texts and literature.

=== Middle Demotic ===
Middle Demotic (c. 400–30 BC) is the stage of writing used during the Ptolemaic Kingdom. From the 4th century BC onward, Demotic held a higher status, as may be seen from its increasing use for literary and religious texts. By the end of the 3rd century BC, Koine Greek was more important, as it was the administrative language of the country; Demotic contracts lost most of their legal force unless there was a note in Greek of being registered with the authorities.

Examples of Ptolemaic Demotic
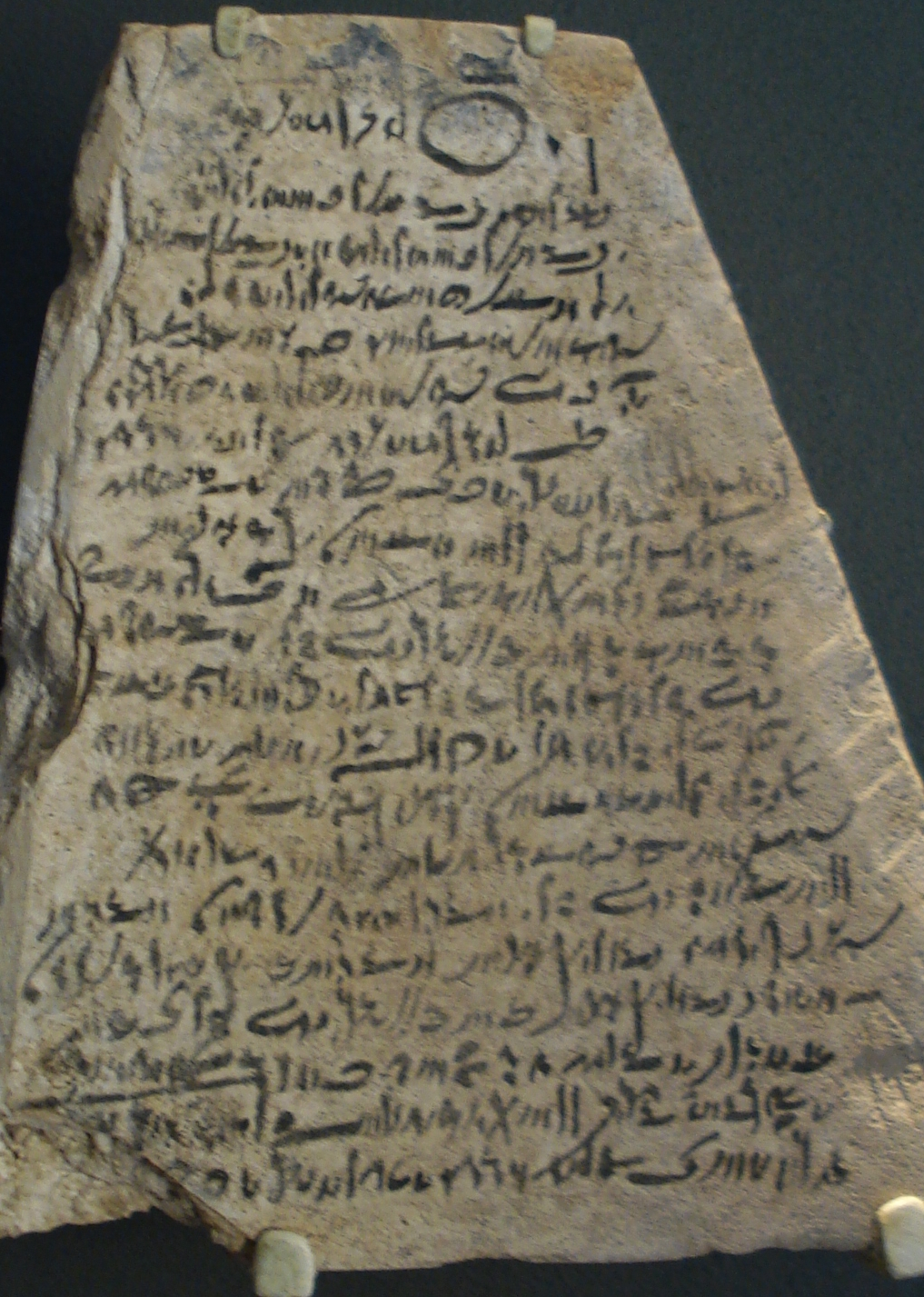
Ostracon with Demotic inscription. Ptolemaic Kingdom, c. 305–30 BC. Probably from Thebes. It is a prayer to the god Amun to heal a man's blindness.

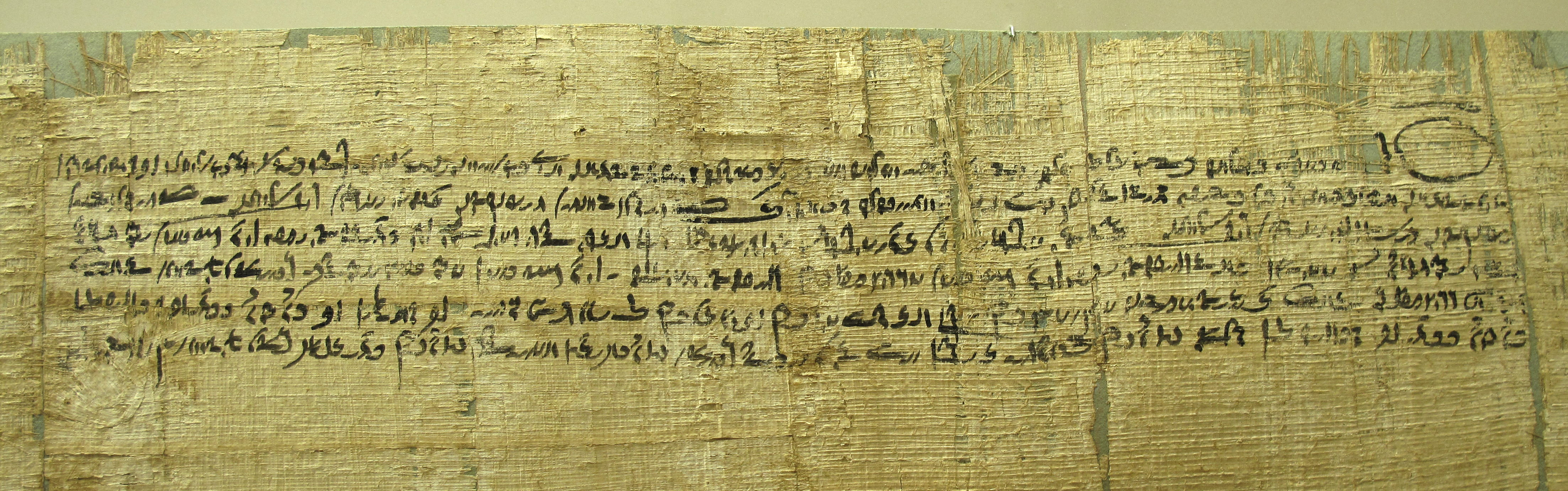
Contract in Demotic writing, with signature of a witness on the verso. Papyrus, Ptolemaic era.

=== Late Demotic ===
From the beginning of Roman rule of Egypt, Demotic was progressively less used in public life. There are, however, a number of literary texts written in Late Demotic (c. 30 BC – 452 AD), especially from the 1st and 2nd centuries AD, though the quantity of all Demotic texts decreased rapidly towards the end of the 2nd century. In contrast to the way Latin eliminated languages in the western part of the Empire, Greek did not replace Demotic Egyptian as the language of everyday communication in Egypt. After that, Demotic was only used for a few ostraca, subscriptions to Greek texts, mummy labels, and graffiti. The last dated example of the Demotic script is a graffito on the walls of the temple of Isis at Philae, dated to 12 December 452. The text simply reads "Petise, son of Petosiris"—who Petise was is unknown.

=== Uniliteral signs and transliteration ===
Like its hieroglyphic predecessor script, Demotic possessed a set of "uniliteral" or "alphabetical" signs that could be used to represent individual phonemes. These are the most common signs in Demotic, making up between one third and one half of all signs in any given text; foreign words are also almost exclusively written with these signs. Later (Roman Period) texts used these signs even more frequently.

The table below gives a list of such uniliteral signs along with their conventional transcription, their hieroglyphic origin, the Coptic letters derived from them, and notes on usage.

Transliteration	Sign	Hieratic	Hieroglyphic origin	Coptic descendant	Notes
ꜣ			A		Mostly used word-initially, only rarely word-finally.
ꜣ			A		Never used word-initially.
ı͗	or or	or	i	ⲳ (Note: Only found in Old Coptic texts.)	Only used word-initially.
e			W i		Marks a prothetic ı͗ or word-internal e.
ꜥ			aA Y1 a	ⲵ	Usually used when not stacked above or below another sign.
ꜥ			a		Usually used when stacked under a horizontal sign.
ꜥ			a		Usually used when stacked on top of a horizontal sign.
y			W i i		
w	or		wA		Used word-medially and word-finally.
w	or		w		Used word-initially; consonantal.
w			Z3		Used when w is a plural marker or the 3rd person plural suffix pronoun.
b			Z1 H_SPACE bA		Used interchangeably.
b			W b		Used interchangeably.
p	or		p		The first form developed from the second and largely supplanted it.
f	or		f	ϥ	
m	or		m		Used interchangeably. The second form developed from the first.
n			n W nw		Usually used when not stacked above or below another sign, but never for the preposition n or the genitive particle n.
n			n	ⲻ	Usually used when stacked above or below another sign.
r			rw		The normal form of r when it is retained as a consonant and not lost to sound change.
r	or		r		Used interchangeably to indicate a vowel corresponding to Coptic ⲉ, sometimes resulting from a loss of a consonant such as in the preposition r; also used for prothetic ı͗.
r	or		A2 i		Used interchangeably to indicate a vowel corresponding to Coptic ⲉ, sometimes resulting from a loss of a consonant such as in the preposition r; also used for prothetic ı͗.
l			Z1 rw		
h			h	ⳏ	
ḥ	or		H	ⳕ	Used interchangeably.
ḥ	or		bH Y1	ϩ, ⳍ	Used interchangeably.
ḫ			x	ⳓ, ⳋ	
h̭	or		x y		
ẖ			M12	ϧ	Usually used when not stacked above or below another sign.
ẖ			X		Usually used when stacked above or below another sign.
s			s		Most common form when not stacked above or below another sign.
s			Z5 Y1 Z1 Aa18		Used often in names and Greek loanwords. Never used word-initially in native Egyptian words.
s	or	or	z		Usually used when stacked under a horizontal sign.
s		or			Usually used when stacked on top of a horizontal sign.
s	or or		t s		Used as a pronoun.
š	or		SA	ϣ, ⳅ	Usually used when not stacked above or below another sign. The second form developed from the first.
š			S	ⳇ	Used when stacked above or below another sign.
q			q	ⲹ	
k			k	ϭ	Often written below the line.
k			Z1 kA		Originally biliteral for kꜣ. In late texts often used as q.
g	or		g	ⳛ	
t	or or		t		
t			D37 t	ϯ (Note: Alternatively, ϯ may be a ligature of ⲧ and ⲓ.)	Less common, except as the verb ḏj 'to give'.
d			n t		
ṱ	or		i ti		Used interchangeably. Marks a word-final t which is actually pronounced, distinguished from the silent t of the feminine suffix.
ṱ			ti		Used interchangeably. Marks a word-final t which is actually pronounced, distinguished from the silent t of the feminine suffix.
ṯ			D51 D40		Originally the writing of the verb ṯꜣj 'to take', sometimes used as a phonogram.
ḏ			A DA	ⳙ	Used interchangeably. The cobra form is rare.
ḏ			DA	ϫ, ⳗ	Used interchangeably. The cobra form is rare.
ḏ			D		Used interchangeably. The cobra form is rare.

== Decipherment ==
The Rosetta Stone, discovered in 1799, is inscribed with a proclamation, written in three scripts: Egyptian hieroglyphs, Demotic, and the Greek alphabet. There are 32 lines of Demotic, which is the middle of the three scripts on the stone. The Demotic was deciphered before the hieroglyphs, starting with the efforts of Antoine Isaac Silvestre de Sacy. Scholars were eventually able to translate the hieroglyphs by comparing them with the Greek words, which could be readily translated, and fortifying that process by applying knowledge of Coptic (the Coptic language being descended from earlier forms of Egyptian represented in hieroglyphic writing). Egyptologists, linguists and papyrologists who specialize in the study of the Demotic stage of Egyptian script are known as Demotists.

== See also ==
- Transliteration of Ancient Egyptian
