= Karl Piehl =

Swedish Egyptologist

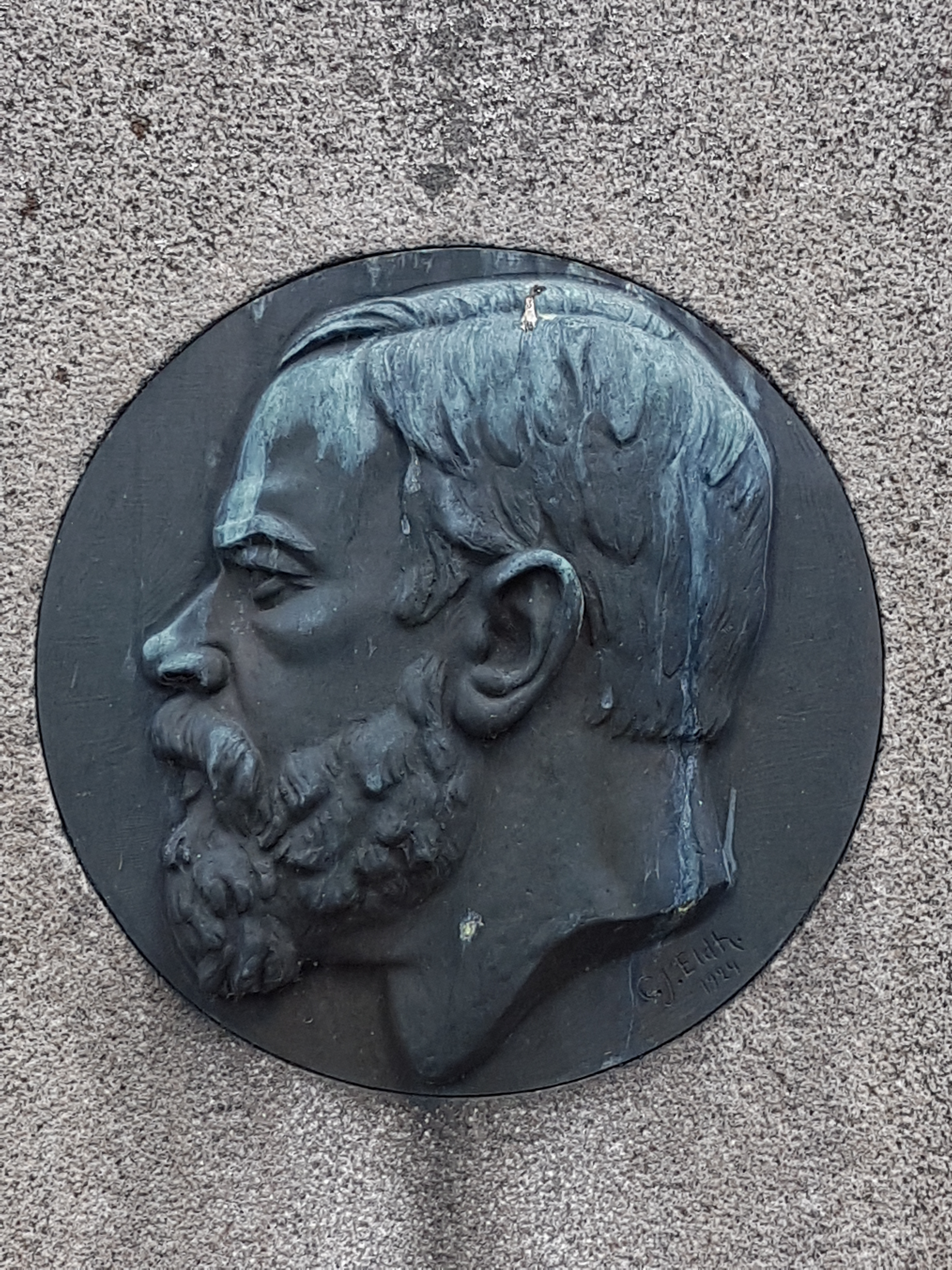
Plaque on tombstone of Karl Piehl

Karl Piehl (1853–1904) was a Swedish Egyptologist.

== Biography ==
He was born in Stockholm. He was docent in Egyptian languages at Uppsala University in 1881, became director of the Egyptian Museum in 1889, and in 1893 was appointed to a newly endowed chair of Egyptology. Three years afterwards Piehl became editor of the Sphinx, a periodical of Egyptian archaeology.

== Works ==
- Petites études égyptologiques (1881)
- Dictionnaire du papyrus Harris No. 1 (1882)
- Inscriptions hiéroglyphiques (1884 sqq.)
