= Gun Björkman =

Swedish Egyptologist and author

- Born: 21 March 1935; Högsby
- Died: 2001 (aged 65–66)
- Occupations: Egyptologist and author
- Awards: Lundequistska Bokhandelns Litteraturpris 1992

Academic background
- Education: Uppsala University

Gun Björkman (1935–2001) was a Swedish Egyptologist and author.

== Biography ==
Björkman was born in Högsby, Sweden in 1935. She graduated in 1953 from Kalmar University and moved to Uppsala. In 1972, she was awarded her PhD and became an associate professor in Egyptology at Uppsala University.

Björkman was also an author, her debut novel was O gamla klang (1958). In her 20s, Björkman began sufferings from diabetes, that later affected her eyesight. She wrote the acclaimed novel Vid tjugo blev hon söt in 1975, and followed it with the sequel Sofia i säcken ten years later in 1985, which focused on a young woman in her twenties, Sofia, who was diagnosed with diabetes. In 1992, Björkman won the Lundequistska Bokhandelns Litteraturpris.

== Publications ==
=== Egyptology ===
- Björkman, Gun. (1966). Smithska Samlingen Av Egyptiska Fornsaker I Östergötlands Och Linköpings Stads Museum.
- Björkman, Gun. (1971). Kings at Karnak. A study of the treatment of the monuments of royal predecessors in the early New Kingdom. Universitet; Almqvist & Wiksell.
- Björkman, Gun. (1971). A selection of the objects in the Smith Collection of Egyptian Antiquities at the Linköping Museum Sweden. Almqvist & Wiksell.
- Björkman, Gun. (1981). De Gamla Egyptierna. Natur och kultur.

=== Other Academic Disciplines ===
- Björkman, Gun. (1994). Maria Sophia De La Gardie : Kvinna I Stormaktstiden. Gyllenstiernska Krapperupstiftelsen.

=== Novels ===
- Björkman, Gun. (1959). O Gamla Klang. Nyblom.
- Björkman, Gun. (1975). Vid Tjugo Błev Hon Söt. Trevi.
- Björkman, Gun. (1985). Sofia I Säcken. Trevi.
