= Jacques Kinnaer =

Belgian Egyptologist and author

Jacques Kinnaer (born 1966) is a Belgian Egyptologist and author with an M.A. from the University of Leuven (1988). He is the creator of the now defunct "The Ancient Egypt Site (domain expired in 2024)", a popular website that dealt with the history and culture of Ancient Egypt.

== Bibliography ==
- "Le Mekes et l'Imit-Per dans les scènes des temples Ptolémaiques et Romains", in OLP 22 (1991), pp. 73–99
- "De Ene en de Velen : Opmerkingen over het Oudegyptisch godsbeeld", in Scriba 1 (1992), pp. 71–137
- "The Decoration Program of the Propylon of Khonsu at Karnak", in KMT 10/2 (1999), pp. 56–65
- The Narmer Palette, in The Glyph 1/18 (September 1999), pp. 8–9
- Miscellaneous contributions to the website of EgyptVoyager, 2000 ff.
- "Thutmose II Chronology Questioned", Reader's Letter in KMT 11/3 (2000), pp. 4–5
- "Aha or Narmer. Which Was Menes?" in KMT 12/3 (2001), pp. 74–81
- "Akhenaten. What's in a Name?" in Seshen 14 (2002), pp. 5–6
- "Het Naqada-label en het debat rond de identificatie van Menes", in Phoenix 48,1 (2002), pp. 4–13
- "The Naqada Label and the Identification of Menes", in: Eldamaty, Mamdouh; Trad, Mai [Editors], Egyptian Collections around the World: Studies for the Centennial of the Egyptian Museum, Cairo. (Cairo; Supreme Council of Antiquities. Distributed by the American University in Cairo Press; 2002), pages 657–666
- "The Naqada Label and the Identification of Menes", in Göttinger Miszellen 196 (2003), pp. 23–30.
- "Nefertiti Maelstrom", Reader's Letter in KMT 14/4 (2003), pp. 5–6
- "What is Really Known About The Narmer Palette?", in KMT 15/1 (2004), pp. 48–54.
