= Gwendolen Crewdson =

Gertrude Gwendolen Bevan Crewdson, known as Gwendolen Crewdson, (1872–1913) was an administrator and benefactor of Girton College, Cambridge, and an Egyptologist. She donated her collection of antiquities to Girton in her will.

== Early life ==
Crewdson was born on 28 March 1872 in Manchester, England. Her father was William Crewdson, a manufacturer, and her mother was Ellen Waterhouse, the sister of architect Alfred Waterhouse. Waterhouse had designed the college Crewdson was to be associated with throughout her career.

Both Crewdson's parents were dead by 1881, and she was raised by a housekeeper who was also a governess. Crewdson moved to Bournemouth for the sea air, before starting at St Leonard's School in St Andrews, Scotland in 1893. She joined Girton College, Cambridge, as an undergraduate the following year to read natural sciences and geology. In 1897-8, her final year as an undergraduate, she was elected senior student by her peers.

In 1899 she bought her own house near Woburn Sands in Bedfordshire. She opened the house as a holiday home for professional women in the summer months.

== Career ==
After graduation, Crewdson was elected by other graduates to represent them on the governing body of Girton. She took up post as the college's librarian and registrar in 1900, and became junior bursar in 1902.

She supported the non-militant British suffrage movement.

Crewdson travelled around Greece, Crete, Sweden and Norway as well as spending six months in Khartoum. She bought many items at the sale hall of the Cairo Museum, which she subsequently left to Girton College. She was also responsible for the college buying the mummified remains of Hermione Grammatike in 1911, by raising the sum of £20 (the equivalent of £1,825 in 2022) to buy it from Flinders Petrie.

Crewdson had struggled with tuberculosis throughout her life, and died of it on 14 October 1913. A memorial brass to her is in the chapel at Girton College.

== Legacy ==
The money raised by letting her house for summer holidays formed the Frances Buss Loan Fund.

She left the college a large portion of land north of the buildings to Girton, which she had purchased to prevent a housing development. This became the Crewdson Field, the College sports grounds.

Crewdson also left the college a collection of Egyptian antiquities which she had acquired during her travels.

Crewdson's successor as bursar, Eleanor Allen, left money to the college to found the Crewdson memorial prize for natural sciences.
