= Bendix Ebbell =

Norwegian theologian and physician

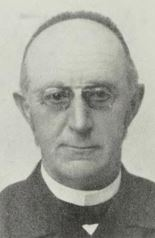
Bendix Ebbell

Bendix Ebbell (April 12, 1865 – June 9, 1941) was a Norwegian theologian and physician.

He was born in Christiania. He took the cand.theol. degree in 1888 and the cand.med. degree in 1892. From 1893 to 1912 he worked as a physician for the Norwegian missionaries in Madagascar, and from 1917 to 1935 he was the county physician in Rogaland. He was also an amateur Egyptologist, working with the Ebers Papyrus and the Edwin Smith Papyrus, and published a book of psalms.
