= Ian Mathieson =

Scottish Egyptologist

Ian James Mathieson (23 May 1927 – 24 June 2010) was a Scottish Egyptologist and Land Surveyor. He pioneered various methods of surveying and mapping of large archaeological sites avoiding the expense or intrusion of excavation.

== Early life ==
Ian Mathieson was born in Edinburgh, the son of James Mathieson, a design engineer. Mathieson attended Daniel Stewart’s College. After military service he qualified as a mining surveyor and geologist at the Heriot Watt College, Edinburgh.

== Career ==
Mathieson first applied his surveying and geological skills with the National Coal Board. In 1956 he joined Hunting Surveys hoping to be part of a survey team in Antarctica that year. Instead, he found himself mapping the valley of the Euphrates River in Iraq. At home and abroad, his projects with the company included working on the location of the Tay Road Bridge and the Severn Bridge, the building of the Dez Dam in Iran, and the mapping of the Five Rivers Canal System in Pakistan and India. In 1965-66, he was in a party that crossed the great Nafud Desert in Saudi Arabia, travelling in convoy and navigating by the sun and stars. In 1972 he became a partner and technical director with Survey and Development Services, Edinburgh, subsequently establishing offices in Saudi Arabia and in Egypt.

== Archaeology ==
Mathieson had long had an interest in archaeology, having visited many Roman sites in Scotland. He devised non-intrusive excavation methods using his experience in geology and civil engineering. However, it was while working in Egypt that he developed a passion for the ancient history of that land. From that point on, especially after he retired from full-time work in 1986, Ancient Egypt would be the focus of his attention.

He first volunteered his services to Harry Smith and David Jeffreys at Memphis and Barry Kemp at Tel el Amarna where he developed his experience in the use of the resistivity meter and the proton magnetometer. Then in 1990 he successfully applied to the Egyptian Antiquities organisation for a concession at Saqqara, the great necropolis of the ancient capital of Memphis. Although numerous sites on the plateau had been examined by different parties in the 19th and 20th centuries, there had never been a comprehensive survey of the entire area.

So the Saqqara Geophysical Survey Project was born, and ran until 2009. The project championed the use of non-destructive and cost-effective geophysical survey techniques in Egypt. Over the years, the project employed a number of methods, but the two used most often were magnetometry and ground-penetrating radar.

Magnetometry exploits the fact that buried structures can cause local variations in the Earth's magnetic field. By using sensitive magnetometers, systematic measurements over a grid enable these variations to be plotted and subsurface features to be seen. Every season an area of the Saqqara plateau was selected to be the target of the survey. Eventually a large proportion of the North Saqqara necropolis was surveyed, revealing the location of many long-lost tombs and temples beneath the desert sand. Radar, on the other hand, involves the transmission of a short pulse of radio energy into the ground with returning echoes being listened for. The radar is then moved and the process repeated.

== Gisr el-Mudir ==
One of the original aims of the project was to use radar to map the Gisr el-Mudir, an enormous stone structure to the south-west of the Step Pyramid enclosure, which had long fascinated Mathieson. He inferred from the apparently poor construction technique, and from pottery recovered from targeted excavations, that the Gisr predated the adjacent Step Pyramid and that it, rather than the pyramid, was probably the world’s oldest free standing stone structure.

== Personal life ==
Mathieson’s other interests included amateur dramatics, through which he met his wife, Padi, whom he married in 1958. He was actively involved in the Edinburgh University Dramatic Society and later with the Edinburgh Graduate Theatre Group. He served on the board of directors of the Edinburgh Festival Fringe Society in the 1970s. He also enjoyed fly-fishing on the rivers and lochs of the Scottish Borders and Highlands.

== Legacy ==
Mathieson’s most tangible legacy was the map showing the underground structures over a large area of the Saqqara plateau. He was supported during his various surveys and excavations by the National Museums of Scotland and Glasgow Museums. Records of his findings have been carefully preserved for reference by future archaeologists.

His other great achievements were the methods he devised to survey and map large sites to discover what lay beneath the ground. In 2010 the Chartered Institution of Civil Engineering Surveyors awarded him The Richard Carter Prize for his outstanding contributions in geospatial engineering.

He was highly regarded in Egypt and his name is included in a list of illustrious archaeologists in the Imhotep Museum at Saqqara.

== Publications ==
- Ian J Mathieson, Ana Tavares. Preliminary Report of the National Museums of Scotland Saqqara Survey Project, 1990-91. The Journal of Egyptian Archaeology, Vol. 79 (1993), pp. 17-31
- Ian Mathieson, Elizabeth Bettles, Sue Davies, H. S. Smith. A Stela of the Persian Period from Saqqara. The Journal of Egyptian Archaeology, Vol. 81 (1995), pp. 23-41
- Ian Mathieson, Elizabeth Bettles, Joanne Clarke, Corinne Duhig, Salima Ikram, Louise Maguire, Sarah Quie, Ana Tavares. The National Museums of Scotland Saqqara Survey Project 1993-1995. The Journal of Egyptian Archaeology, Vol. 83 (1997), pp. 17-53
- Ian Mathieson, Elizabeth Bettles, Jon Dittmer, Colin Reader. The National Museums of Scotland Saqqara Survey Project, Earth Sciences, 1990-98. The Journal of Egyptian Archaeology, Vol. 85 (1999), pp. 21-43
- Anthony Leahy, Ian Mathieson. The Tomb of Nyankhnesut (Re)discovered. The Journal of Egyptian Archaeology, Vol. 87 (2001), pp. 33-42
- Ian Mathieson, Jon Dittmer. The Geophysical Survey of North Saqqara, 2001-7. The Journal of Egyptian Archaeology, Vol. 93 (2007), pp. 79-93
