= Penelope Wilson =

British egyptologist

Penelope Wilson is a British lecturer of Egyptology in the Department of Archaeology at Durham University, UK. She is a member of the Centre for the Study of the Ancient Mediterranean and the Near East. She is also the field director of the joint Durham University/Egypt Exploration Society/Supreme Council of Antiquities project at Sais, Egypt.

Wilson obtained her first class degree in Oriental studies (Egyptian and Coptic) from Liverpool University. In 1991, she completed her Ph.D at Liverpool with lexicographical studies of Egyptian hieroglyphs. Before lecturing at Durham, she worked for seven years as Assistant Keeper in the Department of Antiquities in the Fitzwilliam Museum.

== See also ==
- List of Egyptologists
