= Henning Franzmeier =

German archaeologist and Egyptologist

Henning Franzmeier is a German archaeologist and Egyptologist with the Roemer- und Pelizaeus-Museum Hildesheim and University College London (UCL). Taking over from Edgar B. Pusch he has been field director of the "Qantir-Piramesse Project" in Egypt's Nile Delta since 2015, where Pi-Ramesses, the capital of Ramesside Egypt is being unearthed.

Franzmeier received his PhD in Egyptology from the Free University of Berlin, Germany, with a thesis re-evaluating the excavations of Flinders Petrie and Guy Brunton at the Middle Egyptian site of Sedment in 1920/21. In 2011, in the course of his PhD research, Franzmeier identified in Rochdale a relief fragment of the vizier Prehotep that had been thought lost and was known only from a photograph from the archaeological dig during which it was unearthed in 1920–21. He furthermore holds a MA in Egyptology from the University of Göttingen.

== Selected publications ==
- Mary Ownby, Henning Franzmeier, Sabine Laemmel, Edgar Pusch. Late Bronze Age Imports at Qantir: Petrographic and Contextual Analysis of Fabric Groups. Journal of Ancient Egyptian Interconnections. Vol. 6, No. 3. University of Arizona, Tucson, 2014, pp. 11–21.
- The Secondary Function of Pottery – a Case Study from Qantir-Piramesse. Published in: Functional Aspects of Egyptian Ceramics in their Archaeological Context. Proceedings of a Conference held at the Mcdonald Institute for Archaeological Research, Cambridge, July 24th – July 25th, 2009. Orientalia Lovaniensia Analecta. Vol. 217. Edited by Bettina Bader, Mary F. Ownby, Peeters, Leuven, 2013, pp. 293–306, ISBN 978-90-429-2581-6.
- Henning Franzmeier, Anke Weber. „[...] andererseits finde ich, dass man jetzt nicht so tun soll, als wäre nichts gewesen.“ Die deutsche Ägyptologie in den Jahren 1945−1949 im Spiegel der Korrespondenz mit dem Verlag J. C. Hinrichs. Published in: Ägyptologen und Ägyptologien zwischen Kaiserreich und Gründung der beiden deutschen Staaten. Zeitschrift für ägyptische Sprache und Altertumskunde. Beiheft 1. Edited by Susanne Bickel, Hans-Werner Fischer-Elfert, Antonio Loprieno, Sebastian Richter, De Gruyter, 2013, pp. 113–152, ISBN 978-3-05-006341-6.
- Henning Franzmeier, Felix Höflmayer, Walter Kutschera, Eva M. Wild. Radiocarbon Evidence for New Kingdom Tombs: Sedment 254 and 246. Published in: Egypt and the Levant. Vol. 21. Edited by Manfred Bietak, Österreichische Akademie der Wissenschaften, Wien, 2011, pp. 15–29, ISBN 978-3-7001-7232-1.
- Ein Brunnen in der Ramses-Stadt. Zur Typologie und Funktion von Brunnen und Zisternen im pharaonischen Ägypten. Forschungen in der Ramsesstadt. Vol. 7. Gerstenberg, Hildesheim, 2010, ISBN 978-3-8067-8742-9.
- Die magischen Ziegel des Neuen Reiches – Material und immaterieller Wert einer Objektgruppe. Published in: Mitteilungen des Deutschen Archäologischen Instituts Kairo. Vol. 66. 2010, pp. 93–105.
- Wells and Cisterns in Pharaonic Egypt: The Development of a Technology as a progress of Adaptation to Environmental Situations and Consumers’ Demands. Published in: Current Research in Egyptology 2007. Proceedings of the Eighth Annual Symposium. Swansea University 2007. Edited by Kenneth Griffin in 2008, reprint by Oxbow Books, Oxford, 2016, pp. 37–52, ISBN 978-1-84217-329-9.
