= Martin Isler =

American sculptor and Egyptologist (1926–2013)

Martin Isler (November 25, 1926 – February 2, 2013) was an American sculptor and Egyptologist. His sculpture was primarily direct carving in marble and his archeological work focused on ancient technology, especially building methods. Isler started work as an independent patent illustrator, providing pen and ink drawings to be incorporated into patent applications.

He married Natalie Horwitz and they had two sons, Edward Robert and Jeffrey Alan.

== Books and journals ==
- Sticks, Stones, and Shadows: Building the Egyptian Pyramids, University of Oklahoma Press (2001).ISBN 0-8061-3342-2
- The World and I, Lessons of the Pyramids (06/2002).
- Journal of the American Research Center in Egypt.
1. 1976, Vol. 13 - "Ancient Egyptian Methods of Raising Weights," frontispiece, pp.31-41, pl. 2, 3.
2. 1983, Vol. 20 - "Concerning the Concave Faces on the Great Pyramid," pp. 27-32.
3. 1985, Vol. 22 - "On Pyramid Building," pp. 129-142.
4. 1987, Vol. 24 - "On Pyramid Building 2," p.95-112.
5. 1989, Vol. 26 - "An Ancient Method of Finding and Extending Direction," pp. 191-206.
6. 1991, Vol. 28 - "The Gnomon in Egyptian Antiquity," pp. 155-185.
7. 1987, Vol. 73 - "The Curious Luxor Obelisks," pp. 137-147. The Journal of Egyptian Antiquity.
8. 1991, Vol. 7- "The Merkhet," pp. 53-67. Varia Aegyptiaca.
9. 1992, Vol. 48 - "The Technique of Monolithic Carving," pp. 45-55. Mitteilungen des Deutschen Archäologische

== Sculptures, works ==
Isler went on to carve 28 pieces in marble between 1965 and 2012. From Isler’s summary notes:

- Natalie (1965) Life size, 13”x 10”x 10” Statuary Marble
- Untitled (1966) Life Size, 25.5”x 18”x 15” Statuary Marble
- Natalie II (1968) Life Size, 71”x 17”x 17” Select Marble
- Seated Woman with Tiara (1970) Life Size, 41”x 35”x 26” Statuary Marble
- Standing Woman with Signet Ring (1971) Life Size, 70”x 25”x 17” Statuary Marble
- One More Unfortunate (1973) Life Size, 11” x 12” x 10” Statuary Marble
- Repose (1973) Life Size, 8.5”x 12”x 13” Select Marble
- Godhead (1973) Over Life Size, 13”x 10”x 10” Select Marble
- Woman with Large Hat (1974) Life Size, 41”x 15.5”x 25” Statuary Marble
- Ecstatic Caryatid (1975) Life Size, 15”x 8”x 9” Statuary Marble
- She Was a Phantom of Delight (1995) Life Size, 20”x 14”x 8” Statuary Marble
- From Maytime (1976) Life Size, 11”x 7”x 9” Radio Black Marble
- Homage to Nefertiti (1976) Life Size 15”x 9” x 10” Radio Black Marble
- No Stronger than a Flower (1977) Life Size, 15’’x 11”x 8” Statuary Marble
- Bald Venus (1977) Life Size, 66”x 15”x 14” Statuary Marble
- Angry Stone (2002) Life Size, 12”x 10”x 11” Radio Black Marble
- Neck Offering (2004) 10.5” x 8.5” x 15” Select Marble
- Kate (2006) Life Size, 10.5”x 9.5”x 9” Select Marble
- Madame X (2006) Life Size, 17”x 12.5”x 9” Radio Black Marble
- Young Ballerina (2008) Life Size, 21”x 15”x 10” Radio Black Marble
- Odette (2009) Life Size, 15”x12”x 9” Select Marble
- Boxer (2009) Life Size, 11.5”x 9”x 5” Radio Black Marble
- Nefertiti (2010) Half Life Size, 10.5” x 9” x 5” Bardiglio Marble
- Black Swan (2010) Half life-size, 17.5” x 6” x 8.5” Radio Black Marble
- Anthropomorphic Swan (2011) 14.5”x14.5” x 4.5” Radio Black Marble
- Odile (2012) 13”x10.5” x 7” Cararra Marble
- Emerging Man (2012) 11.5” x 7” x 5” Radio Black Marble
- Samson (2012) 13” x 9” x 5” Radio Black Marble

== Drawings ==
- The Metropolitan Museum of Art, “Egyptian Art in the Age of the Pyramids” (1999).
- The Bruce Museum, “The Art of Time and Marking Time” (2000).
