= Christine El Mahdy =

British egyptologist

Christine El Mahdy (née Hobson, born Christine Margaret Bamford; 31 May 1950 – 7 February 2008) was an English Egyptologist, lecturer and author.

== Career ==
El Mahdy was a specialist in the Amarna Period and the pharaoh Tutankhamun. She used archaeological and historical evidence to reconstruct the life of the boy King and the cause of his death, and re-evaluated the embellishment of the story of the revenge curse and discovery of his tomb. She also wrote about techniques for embalming the dead, the origins, superstitions and purpose of mummification, and the traditional nature of ancient Egyptians in art, medicine and architecture. She was an expert on the Coptic language.

She lectured at Yeovil College, directed the Egyptian society and worked with the British School of Egyptology. She was employed for a time in the Egyptian department at the Bolton Museum and was responsible for the display of Egyptian material at the Liverpool University Museum.

== Books ==
- as Christine Hobson: Exploring the World of the Pharaohs: Complete Guide to Ancient Egypt. (Hardcover) Thames & Hudson, London 1987, ISBN 0-500-05046-5
- Mummies, Myth and Magic in Ancient Egypt. Thames & Hudson, London 1991 (Reprint), ISBN 0-500-27579-3
- The Pyramid Builder: Cheops, the Pharaoh Behind the Great Pyramid, Headline Book Publishing, 1999, ISBN 978-0755310081
- Tutankhamun – The Life and Death of the Boy King. Blessing, München 2000, ISBN 3-89667-072-7.
- The Secret of the Great Pyramid. Deutsche Erstausgabe, 1. Auflage, Goldmann, München 2005, ISBN 3-442-15342-5
- Egypt: 3000 Years of Civilization Brought to Light, Raincoast Book Distribution, 2005, ISBN 9781551928791
