= Gertrud Thausing =

Austrian Egyptologist

- Born: Gertrud Maria Elisa Thausing; 29 December 1905; Vienna, Austria
- Died: 4 May 1997 (aged 91)
- Title: Head of the Institute for Egyptology and African Studies at the University of Vienna (1954-1977)

Academic background
- Education: University of Vienna

Gertrud Maria Elisa Thausing (29 December 1905 – 4 May 1997) was an Austrian Egyptologist, and the head of the Institute for Egyptology and African Studies at the University of Vienna from 1954 to 1977.

== Biography ==
Gertrud Maria Elisa Thausing was born on 29 December 1905 in Vienna. She studied Egyptology at the University of Vienna, and collaborated with prominent Egyptologists Hermann Junker and Wilhelm Czermak. She is most well known for her work on African linguistics, including the study of Egyptian, Coptic and Nubian languages. Her work on Ancient Egyptian religion and mythology has also been widely cited. From 1953 to 1977, she was the head of the Institute for Egyptology and African Studies at the University of Vienna.

She published her autobiography Tarudet. Ein Leben für die Ägyptologie in 1989. She died on 4 May 1997, at the age of 92.

== Selected bibliography ==
- Zwischen den beiden Ewigkeiten: Festschrift Gertrud Thausing (1994) OCLC 473373367
- Tarudet - Ein Leben für die Ägyptologie (1989) ISBN 3-201-01456-7
- Sein und Werden. Versuch einer Ganzheitsschau der Religion des Pharaonenreiches (1971) OCLC 781598979
- Nofretari. Eine Dokumentation der Wandgemälde ihres Grabes (1971) OCLC 1049535673
- Das große ägyptische Totenbuch (Papyrus Reinisch) der Papyrussammlung der Österreichischen Nationalbibliothek (1969) OCLC 602543442
- Der Auferstehungsgedanke in ägyptischen religiösen Texten (1943) OCLC 4098291
