= Demotic Egyptian language =

Period of the Egyptian language

Demotiс Egyptian
- Demotic
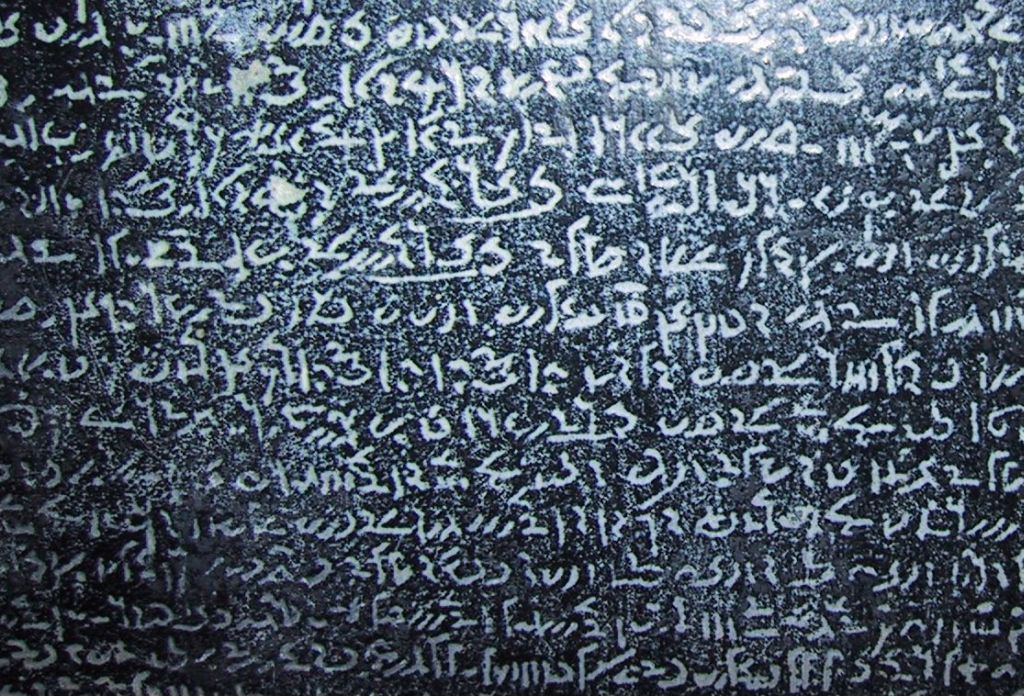
- Demotic script on the Rosetta Stone
- Date: c. 700 BC
- Region: Egypt
- Ethnicity: Egyptians
- Extinct: 5th century
- Language family: Afroasiatic: Egyptian; Demotiс Egyptian
- Early forms: Archaic Egyptian: Old Egyptian; Mid Egyptian; Late Egyptian
- Writing system: Demotic script

Official status
- Official language in: Roman Egypt

Language codes
- ISO 639-2: egy
- ISO 639-3: egy
- Glottolog: demo1234 Demotic Egyptian

Demotiс Egyptian language was the state of the Egyptian language from the seventh century BC to the fifth century AD. The formation and development of the Demotic language as a separate language from Late Egyptian was strongly influenced by Aramaic and Ancient Greek.

== History and periods ==
As a stage in the continuing evolution of the Egyptian language that would eventually pass into the Coptic language, Bresciani (1986) divides the history of the Demotic language (as well as its script) into three periods:

1. Old Demotic, used during the 28th–30th dynasties,
2. Ptolemaic Demotic, used during Ptolemaic rule, and
3. Roman Demotic, during the period of Roman rule in Egypt.

Roman Demotic in particular exhibits a number of grammatical innovations that distinguishes it from earlier forms of Demotic, such as:

- the attestation of suffix pronouns on definite articles used alone without a following noun,
- the loss of distinctions in personal endings used with the qualitative verb forms,
- the innovation of the Future I verb tense form in the pattern tw-j nꜣ stm,
- the expansion of certain periphrastic verbal constructions from use with specific verbs to general use with all verbs, as with the Positive Aorist ir-f sdm, or the Optative mj ir-f stm, and
- the generalized use of the preposition n with nouns that serve as the direct complement of verbs.

== Phonology ==
Like earlier phases of the Egyptian language, Demotic was written with a consonant-based script. These consonant-based graphemes form the basis for the reconstructions of Demotic consonants, as presented in the table below.

Demotic consonant phonemes
	Labial		Alveolar		Palatal		Velar		Uvular	Pharyngeal		Glottal
Nasal	m		n									
Plosive	p	b	t	d	tʲ	dʲ	k	g	q			ʔ
fricative	f		s		ʃ		x			ħ	ʕ	h
Approximant			r	l	j		w					

== Grammar ==
=== Articles ===
Demotic had definite and indefinite articles that exhibited a three-way distinction between gender and number.

Demotic Articles
	Singular		Plural
	Masculine	Feminine	
Definite	pꜣ	tꜣ	nꜣ
Indefinite	wꜥ	wꜥ.t	hyn.w

Some examples:

pꜣ rꜥ
the.M Sun.god
'the Sun-god'

tꜣ mj.t
the.F road-F
'the road'

In some specific cases, definite nouns could appear with no article, such as in expressions of time, or with body part nouns in a direct genitive construction:

n grḥ
at night
'at night'

jrṱ=f
eye=3SG
'his eye'

==== Possessives ====
The definite article could also combine with y and a suffix pronoun to form possessives, which could be followed by a noun or appear alone. Some examples:

tꜣy=y mw.t
the.F=1SG mother-F
'my mother'

nꜣy=f sn.w
the.PL=3SG.M brother-PL
'his brothers'

pꜣy=s
the.M=3SG.F
'her own'

=== Pronouns ===
As with earlier periods of Egyptian, Demotic had a set of independent pronouns and another of dependent pronouns.

Independent pronouns in Demotic served in nominal sentences and cleft sentences, and had distinctions for person, number, and gender.

Demotic Independent Pronouns
	Singular		Plural
	Masculine	Feminine	
1st person	jnk		jnn
2nd person	mtwk	mtwt	mtwtn
3rd person	mtwf	mtws	mtww

Dependent pronouns in Demotic served as pronominal direct objects following imperatives or conjugated verbs.

Demotic Dependent Pronouns
	Singular		Plural
	Masculine	Feminine	
1st person	ṱ=y		ṱ=n
2nd person	ṱ=k	ṱ=t	ṱ=tn
3rd person	s	s	st

Demotic also had a set of interrogative pronouns, including jh̭ and nm, both of which meant 'who?' or 'what?'.

=== Prepositions ===
Demotic had two types of simple prepositions: those that maintained a single form in all environments, and those that changed form if followed by a pronominal object. Those that had a single form included jrm 'with, and', jwṱ 'between', jwty 'without', ẖn 'in', and ḥr 'over, upon'. Prepositions that changed form did so as in the table below.

Demotic prepositions with special forms
			'to, for'	'in'	'to(ward)'	'under'
Before a noun			n	n	r	ẖr
1st person	singular		n=y	n-jm=y	r-ḥr=y	ẖr-r-ḥr=y
1st person	plural		n=n	n-jm=n	r-ḥr=n	
2nd person	singular	masculine	n=k	n-jm=k	r-jr=k	ẖr-r(-jr)=k
2nd person	singular	feminine	n=t	n-jm=t	r-ḥr=t	
2nd person	plural		n=tn	n-jm=tn	r-ḥr=tn	
3rd person	singular	masculine	n=f	n-jm=f	r-r=f	ẖr-(r-)r=f
3rd person	singular	feminine	n=s	n-jm=s	r-r=s	ẖr-r-r=s
3rd person	plural		n=w	n-jm=w	r-r=w	ẖr-r=w

Some examples of simple prepositions with nouns:

n ḥꜣṱ=k
in heart=2SG
'in your heart'

n pꜣy=f ḥry
to the.M=3SG superior
'to its superior'

=== Particles ===
Demotic possessed a system of particles that worked with verbs and clauses in various functions. A table of some of these with their functions appears below.

Demotic particles
Form	Function
j	vocative
jn	interrogative
jn-nꜣ	conditional
bw	negative
bn	negative
my	hortative
hwn-nꜣw	irrealis
hmy	"would that!", "if"
ḫr	aorist
ḏd	purpose

A special group of particles, termed "sentence markers" or "converters", could appear at the beginning of a clause to modify the clause's function or meaning. These included the circumstantial converter jw, the relative converter nt, the second tense converter jjr, and the imperfect converter wn-nꜣw.

=== Adverbs ===
Adverbs in Demotic included adverbs of quality, place, and time. Adverbs composed of a single word include tj 'here', tn 'where', and rstj 'tomorrow'. Multiword adverbial expressions included r bnr 'outside', r ẖn 'inside', n sf 'yesterday', n grḥ 'at night', and r šw 'never'.

== Monuments ==
Among the monuments of a new daily language literature, comparing to the previous stages of the Egyptian language comes fairy genre, a fable. These fables were intimately entwined with the mythology and narrated the adventures of the mythological characters of the Egyptian religion. Leiden papyrus, dating from the 1st–2nd centuries BC, contains such fables.

== Notes ==
1. This same tripartite historical division is likewise adopted by Johnson (1976), where she adopts the term "Saite and Persian" for Bresciani's "Old Demotic", which Bresciani considers to encompass Saitic, Persian, and Demotic paleographic types.

== Bibliography ==
- Allen, James P. (2013). The Ancient Egyptian Language: An Historical Study. Cambridge: Cambridge University Press. ISBN 978-1-107-03246-0.
- Bresciani, Edda (1986). Nozioni elementari di grammatica demotica. Milano: Istituto Editoriale Cisalpino-Goliardica. ISBN 978-8820501501.
- Johnson, Janet H. (2000). Thus Wrote ’Onchsheshonqy – An Introductory Grammar of Demotic (Third ed.). Chicago: Oriental Institute of the University of Chicago. ISBN 0-918986-76-1.
- Johnson, Janet H. (1976). The Demotic Verbal System. Chicago: Oriental Institute of the University of Chicago. ISBN 0-918986-02-8.
- Loprieno, Antonio (1995). Ancient Egyptian: A Linguistic Introduction. Cambridge: Cambridge University Press. ISBN 0-521-44384-9.
- Simpson, R. S. (1996). Demotic Grammar in the Ptolemaic Sacerdotal Decrees. Oxford: Griffith Institute Monographs, Griffith Institute, Ashmolean Museum. ISBN 0-900416-65-3.
