= Emily Teeter =

American Egyptologist (born 1953)

- Born: 1953 (age 72–73)
- Education: University of Washington (BA); University of Chicago (PhD)
- Scientific career
- Fields: Egyptology
- Workplaces: Institute for the Study of Ancient Cultures

Emily Teeter (born 1953) is an American Egyptologist and research associate at the Institute for the Study of Ancient Cultures in Chicago. She has served as a consultant or curator for Egyptian galleries at several museums, including the Institute for the Study of Ancient Cultures, the Art Institute of Chicago, and the Field Museum.

Teeter earned a BA in history from the University of Washington. She received her PhD from the Department of Near Eastern Languages and Civilizations at the University of Chicago.

Sher served a three-year term as president of the American Research Center in Egypt (ARCE) and additionally serves as the editor of its academic journal JARCE.

== Books ==
- Chicago on the Nile: A Century of Work by the Epigraphic Survey of the University of Chicago (2024)
- Religion and Ritual in Ancient Egypt (2011)
- Egypt and the Egyptians (with Douglas J. Brewer) (2007)
- The Life of Meresamun: A Temple Singer in Ancient Egypt (with Janet H. Johnson), University of Chicago Oriental Institute Museum Publications, OIMP 29, 135 pages, 120 color and 20 B&W illustrations, 2009 PDF
- E. Teeter (editor) "Before the Pyramids: The Origins of Egyptian Civilization", The Oriental Institute of the Museum of Chicago 33, 2011 PDF
