= François Chabas =

French Egyptologist (1817–1882)

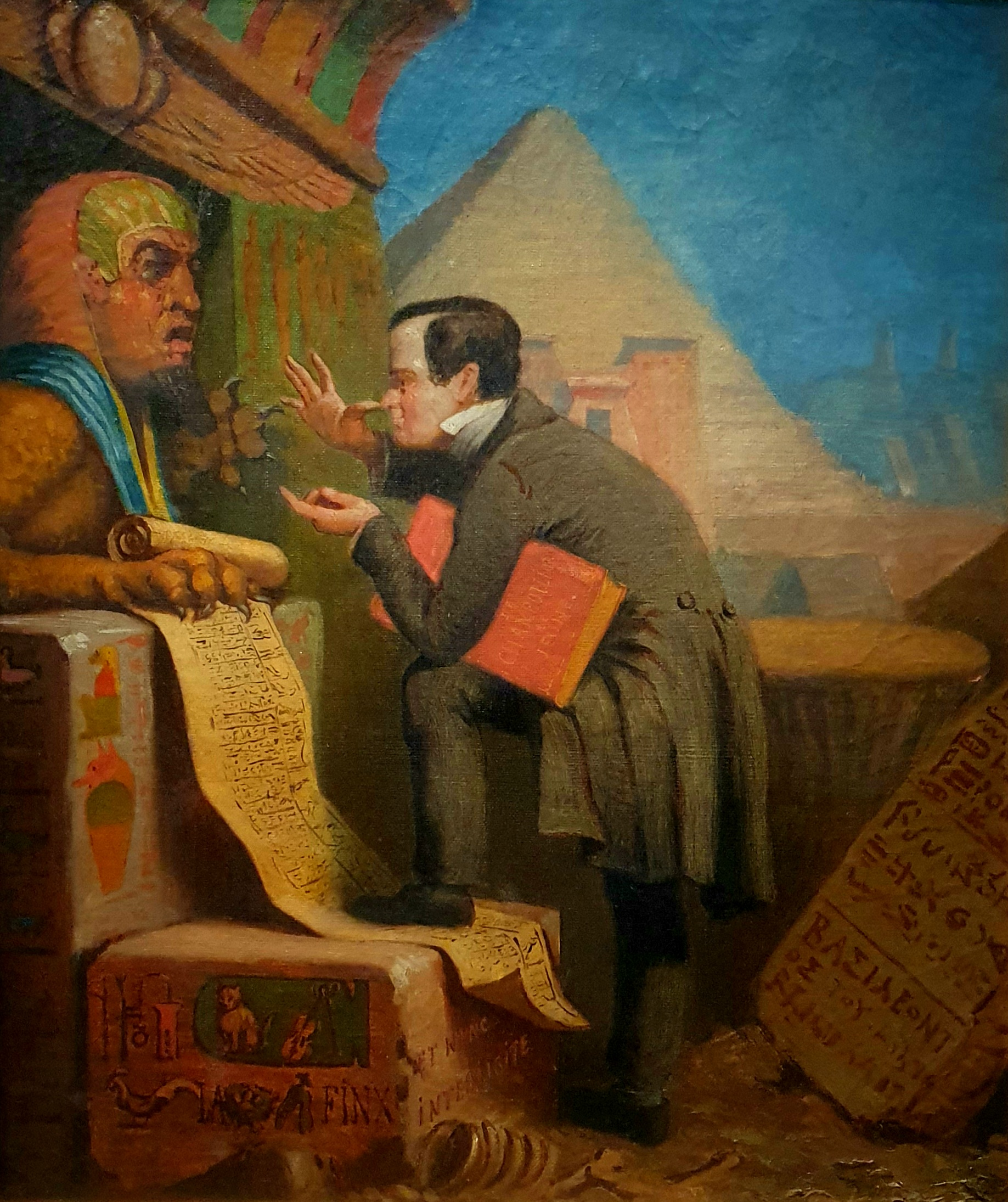
Portrait of Francois Chabas by Jules Chevrier

François Joseph Chabas (2 January 1817, Briançon, Hautes-Alpes – 17 May 1882, Versailles) was a French Egyptologist.

Chabas came from a modest background, studied at Chalon and became a wine merchant. Self-taught, he learned Latin, Greek and other languages. Interested in anthropology, he turned to study Old Egyptian languages. Chabas was a member of several learned societies and later president of the Conseil departemental of Saône-et-Loire.

Between 1876 and 1880, Chabas edited the journal L'Égyptologie. His works have contributed much to elucidate the history of the invasion and repulsion of the Hyksos in Egypt.

Chabas was elected a foreign member of the Royal Netherlands Academy of Arts and Sciences in 1865. He was elected as a member of the American Philosophical Society in 1869.

== Works ==
- Le plus ancien livre du monde, étude sur le papyrus Prisse, (1858) – The oldest book in the world, a study of the Prisse Papyrus.
- Mélanges égyptologiques (3 Ser. in 4 Vols. Paris: Châlon, 1862–1873) – Egyptology medley.
- Voyage d'un Egyptien en Syrie, en Phénicie, en Palestine au quatorzième siècle avant notre ère (Paris 1866) – Voyage of an Egyptian in Syria, Phoenicia, Palestine in the 14th century BC.
- Les pasteurs en Egypte (Amsterdam 1868) – The pasteurs in Egypt (in reference to the Hyksos).
- Étude sur l'antiquité historique d'après les sources égyptiennes et les monuments réputés préhistoriques (Amsterdam 1872) – Study of the ancient history according to Egyptian sources and prehistoric monuments.
- Recherches pour servir à l'histoire de la XIX^{ème} dynastie et spécialment à celle des temps de l'Exode (Amsterdam 1873) – Research in regards to the history of the 19th dynasty and especially to that of the time of the Exodus.
- Recherches sur les poids, mesures et monnaies des anciens Égyptiens, (1876) – Research on the weights, measures and coins of ancient Egypt.
