= Laure Pantalacci =

French egyptologist and historian

Laure Pantalacci is a French Egyptologist who was director of the Institut français d'archéologie orientale from 2005 to 2010 and president of the International Association of Egyptologists.
