= Elephantine papyri and ostraca =

5th- to 4th-century BCE Egyptian texts

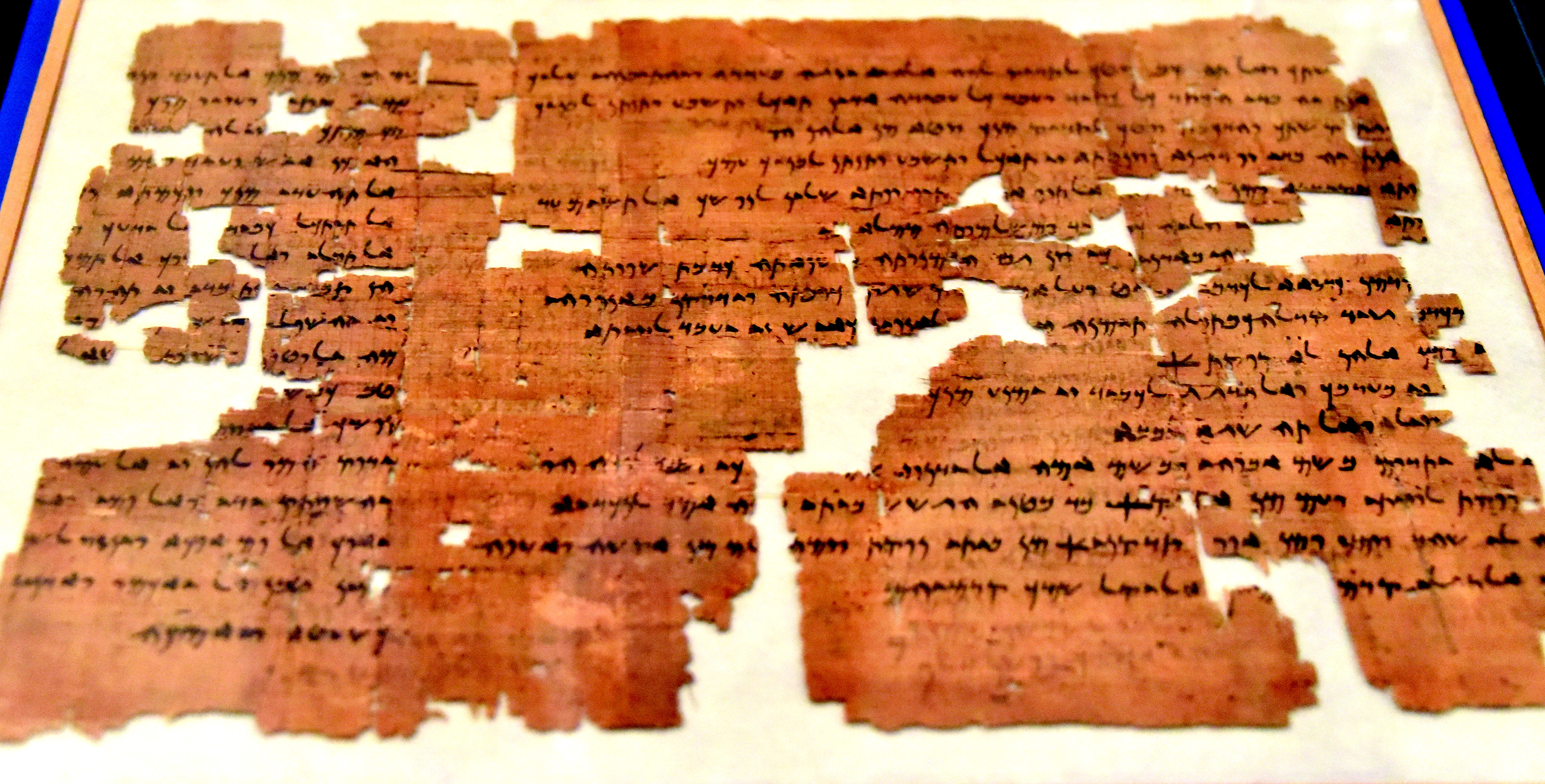
Papyrus narrating the story of the wise chancellor Ahiqar. Aramaic script. 5th century BCE. From Elephantine, Egypt. Neues Museum, Berlin

The Elephantine papyri and ostraca consist of thousands of documents from the Egyptian border fortresses of Elephantine and Aswan, which yielded hundreds of papyri and ostraca in hieratic and demotic Egyptian, Aramaic, Koine Greek, Latin and Coptic, spanning a period of 100 years in the 5th to 4th centuries BCE. The documents include letters and legal contracts from family and other archives and are thus an invaluable source of knowledge for scholars of varied disciplines such as epistolography, law, society, religion, language, and onomastics. The Elephantine documents include letters and legal contracts from family and other archives: divorce documents, the manumission of slaves, and other business. The dry soil of Upper Egypt preserved the documents.

Hundreds of these legal documents and a cache of letters survived, turned up on the local "grey market" of antiquities starting in the late 19th century, and were scattered into several Western collections.

A number of the Aramaic papyri document the Jewish community among soldiers stationed at Elephantine under Achaemenid rule, 495–399 BCE. The so-called "Passover Letter" of 419 BCE (discovered in 1907), which appears to give instructions for the observance of the Festival of Unleavened Bread (though Passover itself is not mentioned in the extant text), is in the Egyptian Museum of Berlin.

The standard reference collection of the Aramaic documents from Elephantine is the Textbook of Aramaic Documents from Ancient Egypt.

== Discovery, excavation, collections and publications ==
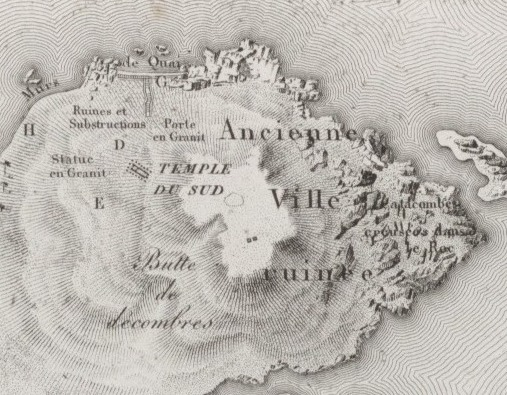
Map of the mound from the 1809 Carte de l'Égypte

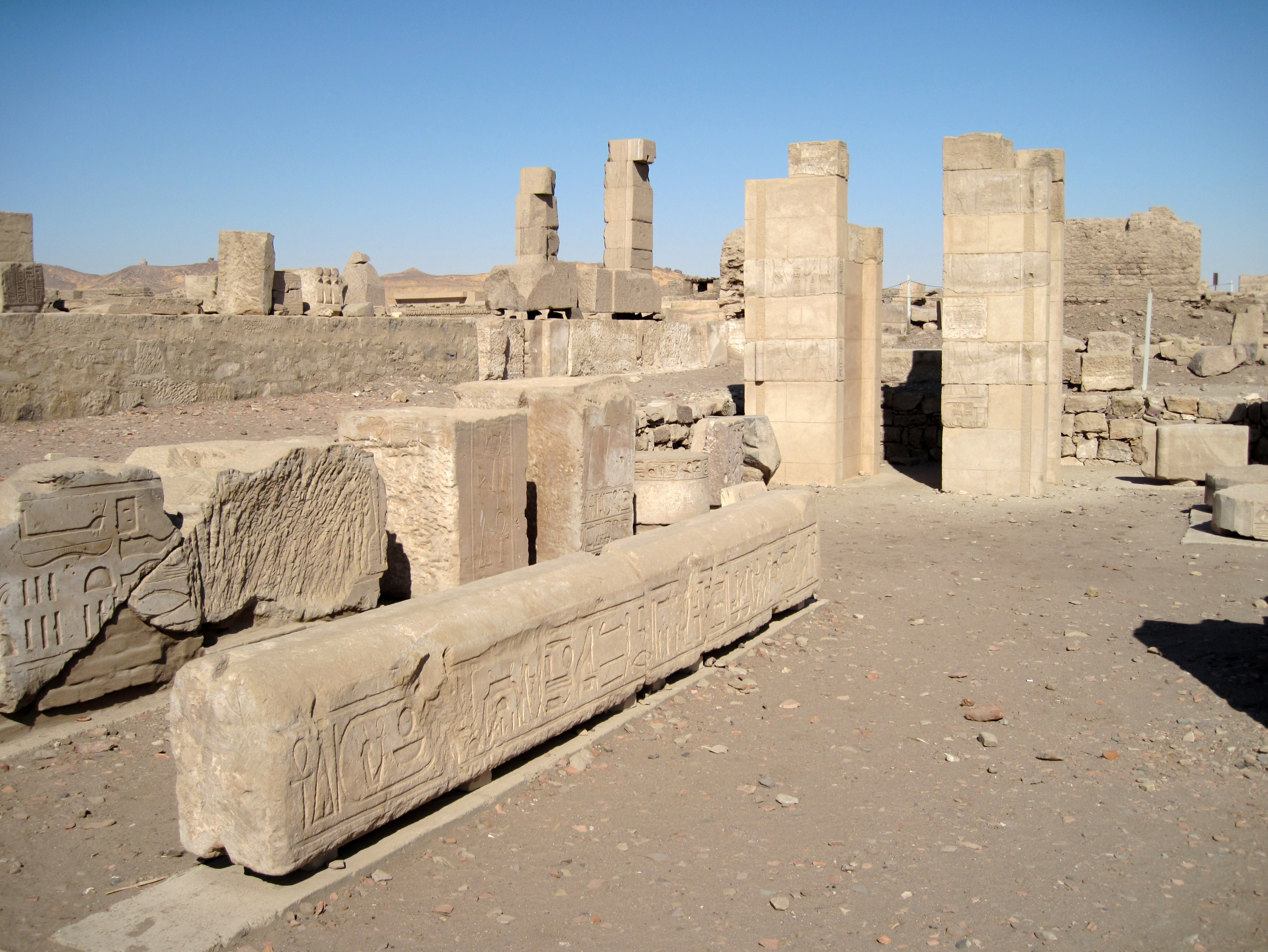
Modern photo of the main temple on the mound, following excavation

Images of the mound in which the discoveries were located

Between 1815 and 1904, all discoveries were unprovenanced and came via informal discoveries and antiquities dealers; only later were they understood by scholars to have originated from Elephantine. The first known such papyri were bought by Giovanni Belzoni and Bernardino Drovetti; a number of Aramaic letters and a demotic letter were presented by Belzoni to the Musei Civici di Padova in 1819 and three hieratic pieces from Drovetti – and the Turin Aramaic Papyrus – were deposited at the new Museo Egizio in Turin in 1824.

Formal excavation of the mound at Elephantine Island began in 1904, and continued for the next seven years. Further finds were discovered through the first half of the 20th century.

The mode of burial of the documents remains unknown, but they are thought to have been stored laterally and horizontally in close proximity to each other.

=== Major discoveries ===
The major Elephantine collections consist of discoveries from the end of the 19th and start of the 20th century, and these collections are now in museums in Berlin, Brooklyn, Cairo, London, Munich, and Paris. The largest collection is part of the Berlin Papyrus Collection of the Berlin State Museums with texts in each of the languages.

- 1875–76: The British Museum acquired two Aramaic and one Coptic ostraca from the Rev. Greville John Chester. The two Aramaic ostraca are now known as CIS II 138 (also known as NSI 74, KAI 271 and British Museum E14219) and CIS II 139 (British Museum E14420)
- 1890s: From Luxor via the dealer Abd el-Megid was purchased a bilingual family archive which included three Greek legal texts and a demotic matrimonial document
- 1893: American collector Charles Edwin Wilbour acquired a number of papyri, including 12 Aramaic documents from the Anani archive. Wilbour's family passed the documents to the Brooklyn Museum a few decades after his death, and they were published in 1953. It was at this time that scholars concluded that "Wilbour had acquired the first Elephantine papyri".
- 1898–99: Richard August Reitzenstein and Wilhelm Spiegelberg acquired the first identifiable Aramaic papyrus from Elephantine in 1898–99. He donated it to what is now the National and University Library in Strasbourg.
- 1899: The Papyrussammlung und Papyrusmuseum of Vienna acquired four demotic documents, probably via Jakob Krall
- 1901: Archibald Henry Sayce acquired a fragmented Aramaic papyrus and three Aramaic ostraca, which he donated to the Bodleian Library in Oxford
- 1901–02: large collection of Greek and demotic papyri, including an IOU of a blacksmith from Syene, were acquired by Théodore Reinach; this collection is now in the Sorbonne.
- Early 1900s: Over a number of years, Baroness Mary Cecil and Robert Mond acquired from dealers in Aswan a total of 11 Aramaic papyri from the Mibtahiah archive. These were donated to the Egyptian Museum in Cairo, which retained nine; one was subsequently acquired by the Bodleian. Their high-profile publication in 1906 by Sayce and Cowley catalyzed expeditions for more Aramaic papyri. They were originally thought to have been found in Aswan rather than on the Elephantine island.
- 1904: The first (brief) excavation on the Elephantine mound took place, after Sayce encouraged Gaston Maspero to excavate to search there for more Aramaic texts. No Aramaic texts were found, but a number of Greek and demotic fragments were.
- Early 1906 until 1908: the German expedition was assigned to excavate the Western side of the mound; following Otto Rubensohn having been told by local Egyptians that it was the find spot of the recently discovered Aramaic papyri. The expedition worked for three seasons, two under the direction of Rubensohn and the third under Friedrich Zucker. The daily logs reported the discovery of papyri and ostraca, but made no record of their find-spots; the report was published by Hans Wolfgang Müller in 1980–82. The Aramaic, and some Greek, papyri were well published, but most of the demotic, hieratic, and Coptic texts were not. The Demotic and Greek papyri were found early on. The first Aramaic papyri were discovered on New Year's Day, 1907 in the rubble of a room at the northern edge of the mound, 0.5m beneath the surface; this was found to be part of an "Aramaic quarter”, a housing complex which yielded numerous Aramaic papyri. The three most significant of these Aramaic documents were published in 1907 by Eduard Sachau. Many of these discoveries are now in the Berlin State Museums; however, between 1907 and 1912 ten Greek and demotic pieces, and many further Aramaic papyri, were transferred to the Egyptian Museum in Cairo.
- Late 1906 until 1911: following the German successes, the French were assigned to excavate the eastern side of the mound. There were four campaigns, the first two under Charles Clermont-Ganneau, the third under Joseph Étienne Gautier, and the fourth under Jean Clédat. Daily records were kept; these were deposited in the Académie des Inscriptions et Belles-Lettres in the Institut de France in Paris and some parts have been published. The excavations discovered hundreds of Aramaic, demotic, Greek, Coptic and Arabic ostraca; these are now held at the Egyptian Museum in Cairo and the Académie des Inscriptions et Belles-Lettres in Paris. It also discovered five Greek papyri, and a hieratic papyrus now at the Louvre.
- 1907: The Byzantine "Patermouthis archive" of approximately 30 documents was acquired in two halves: Robert de Rustafjaell acquired half in Luxor for the British Museum in 1907, and Friedrich Zucker acquired half in Cairo for the Bavarian State Library in Munich in 1908. Coptic papyri acquired by Rustafjaell at the same time are now in the British Library.
- 1910–11: A batch of Arabic papyri were acquired by the State Library of Hamburg
- 1926: Bernard P. Grenfell and Francis W. Kelsey acquired seventy-seven Greek papyri, including one from Elephantine, for the University of Wisconsin, Madison.
- 1945: Sami Gabri discovered the Hermopolis Aramaic papyri in Tuna el-Gebel (Hermopolis West): eight Aramaic letters which were deposited in the Department of Archaeology of the University of Cairo.

=== Individual finds attributed to Elephantine ===
Numerous smaller finds have been attributed to Elephantine:

- 1815–1819: a number of Aramaic letters and a demotic letter were presented by Giovanni Belzoni to the Musei Civici di Padova in 1819.
- 1817–1818: Papyrus Bibliothèque Nationale: Bibliothèque Nationale, Butehamun correspondence letter bought by Frédéric Cailliaud.
- 1819 Papyrus Edmonstone: A Greek manumission document was acquired in 1819 by Sir Archibald Edmonstone and is still in the hands of a private collector.
- 1821: Papyrus Paris: Bibliothèque Nationale, a Greek conveyance document from a traveler named Casati.
- 1824: Turin Aramaic Papyrus: acquired by Bernardino Drovetti and donated to the new Museo Egizio in Turin in 1824, a hieratic charge sheet against the Elephantine Khnum priests. Donated together with two other hieratic letters from the Butehamun correspondence probably sent from Elephantine.
- 1828: Papyrus Leiden: Giovanni Anastasi acquired, allegedly at Philae but presumably at Elephantine, on behalf of the Rijksmuseum van Oudheden in Leiden, a 5th-century Greek petition to Emperor Theodosius.
- 1862: Papyrus Valençay: A Ramesside hieratic letter from the collection of the Duke of Valençay, now in the private collection of Jean Morel in the Château de Fins, Dun-le-Poëlier. It may have been originally purchased in 1862–63 by Count Eustachy Tyszkiewicz.
- 1881: Papyrus Dodgson: In January, 1881 Elkanah Armitage acquired a demotic papyrus on Elephantine which he presented to Aquila Dodgson; it was subsequently passed in 1932 to the Ashmolean Museum in Oxford.
- 1887: The Dream ostracon (CIS II 137, also known as NSI 73 and KAI 270) is brought back from Elephantine by Adolf Erman.
- 1896: three 6th dynasty hieratic papyri were acquired at Luxor for the Berlin State Museums.
- 1898: The hieratic Semna Despatches discovered by James Quibell in Thebes included one sent from Elephantine.
- 1909: The Pushkin Museum acquired a demotic papyrus from the collection of Vladimir Golenishchev.
- 1914: Sayce gave the Bodleian Library a Coptic ostracon.
- 1920: James Henry Breasted purchased from Mohareb Todrous at Luxor for the Oriental Institute of the University of Chicago an Arabic reddish brown leather parchment.
- 1927: Papyrus Lob: Spiegelberg acquired for the Staatliche Sammlung Agyptischer Kunst in Munich a demotic papyrus which became known by the name of the benefactor Dr. James Lob.
- 1930: The Bristol Museum and Art Gallery acquired a Coptic ostracon from Francis Fox Tuckett.
- Early 1930s: Berlin State Museums acquired a unique hieratic leather document.

=== Publication history ===
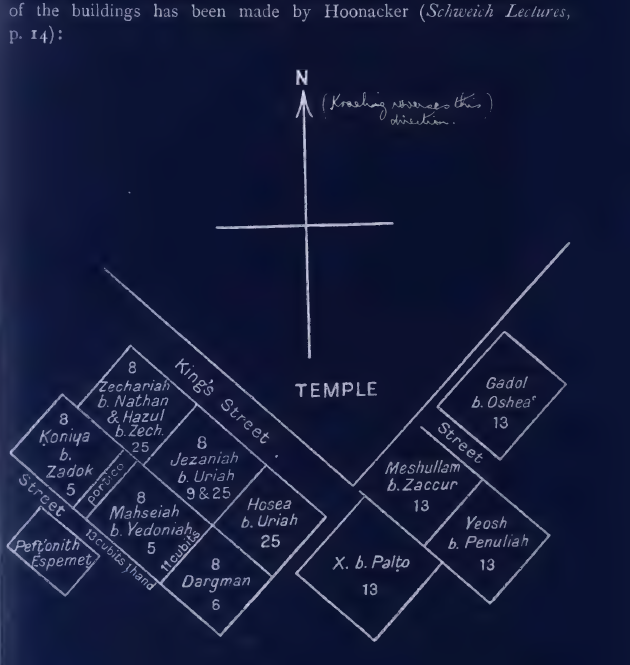
Elephantine temple environs layout. From major work, Arthur Cowley's 1923 "Aramaic Papyri."

The publication of the documents from Elephantine discovered in the 19th and early 20th centuries, took many years, and is still ongoing. The Aramaic and Demotic texts have received the greatest and most complete focus from scholars.

Aramaic

- 1824–1828: Turin Aramaic Papyrus
- 1887: Julius Euting publishes the Dream ostracon (later known as CIS II 137)
- 1889: The Corpus Inscriptionum Semiticarum publishes the Greville Chester ostraca as CIS II 138–139 and the Golenishchev ostraca as CIS II 154–155
- 1903: Arthur Cowley published the papyrus and ostraca found by Sayce in 1901
- 1903: Julius Euting published the Strasbourg Aramaic papyrus which had been discovered in 1898–1899
- 1906: Sayce and Cowley published the Cecil-Mond documents in the high-profile Aramaic Papyri Discovered at Assuan. A sensation was caused; as they summarized in the introduction to the work: "Perhaps one of the most remarkable results of the discovery is the proof it affords us that within a century after the death of Jeremiah a colony of Jews had found their way to Assuan, at the southern limit of Egypt, where they had acquired houses and other property and were engaged in trade as bankers or money-lenders"
- 1911: Eduard Sachau published all the Rubensohn Aramaic finds which had been discovered in 1907
- 1923: Arthur Cowley published 87 Aramaic papyri, all that were then known, in his Aramaic Papyri of the fifth century
- 1953: Emil Kraeling published the Brooklyn Museum papyri, which had been discovered in 1893
- 1960: Edda Bresciani published the Padua Aramaic papyri which had been found in 1815–1819
- 1966: Bresciani and Murad Kamil published the Hermopolis Aramaic papyri discovered in 1945

Demotic

- 1883: P. Dodgson was published by Eugène Revillout
- 1908: Wilhelm Spiegelberg published 13 Rubensohn papyri found in 1906–07
- 1926–1928: Wilhelm Spiegelberg published P. Lob and three further Berlin demotic papyri
- 1939–1957: Wolja Erichsen published six Berlin demotic papyri
- 1962 Edda Bresciani published the Padua demotic papyrus found in 1819
- 1963–1965: Wolja Erichsen and Erich Lüddeckens published the two Vienna papyri found in 1899
- 1971–1978: Karl-Theodor Zauzich catalogued 333 Berlin demotic papyri, publishing 20 in 1978 and 29 in 1993
- 1974: Michel Malinine published the Moscow papyrus found in 1909

Greek

- 1828: Thomas Young published P. Edmonstone, found in 1819
- 1822: Antoine-Jean Saint-Martin published a Greek fragment found in 1821, now in the Bibliothèque Nationale
- 1828: The Leiden papyrus was published shortly after its discovery
- 1907: The two major Greek papyri found by Rubensohn were published a year after their discovery
- 1911: Sachau published another Greek Rubensohn fragment
- 1912: Friedrich Preisigke published the Strasbourg papyrus
- 1914: Kaspar Ernst August Heisenberg and Leopold Wenger published the part of the Patermouthis archive acquired by the Munich museum in 1908
- 1917: Idris Bell published the part of the Patermouthis archive acquired by the British museum
- 1922: Wilhelm Schubart and Ernst Kühn published the three Abd el-Megid papyri in Berlin
- 1940: Paul Collart published the Greek fragment from the 1901–1902 Reinach collection in the Sorbonne
- 1950: André Bataille published two of the Clermont-Ganneau Greek papyri donated to the Académie des Inscriptions in 1907–1908
- 1967: Pieter Johannes Sijpesteijn published the Wisconsin papyrus discovered in 1926
- 1980: William Brasher published two fragments from the 1907–1908 Zucker excavations

Hieratic

- 1895: Spiegelberg published the Butehamun letters, first acquired in 1817–18
- 1911: Georg Möller transcribed a letter from the Berlin museum purchased in 1896
- 1924: T. Eric Peet published one of the Turin hieratic pieces from the Drovetti Collection found in 1824
- 1939: Jaroslav Černý published two of the Turin hieratic pieces from the Drovetti Collection found in 1824
- 1945: Paul C. Smither published the "Semna Despatches", discovered in 1898
- 1948: A Berlin leather piece discovered in 1930 was published
- 1951: Alan Gardiner published P. Valençay, which had been discovered in 1862–63
- 1974: Wolfhart Westendorf published the Berlin medical papyrus fragment, discovered 1906–1908
- 1978: Paule Posener-Kriéger published the Clermont-Ganneau papyrus, found in 1907

Another forty catalogued hieratic fragments in the Berlin Museum await publication.

Coptic

- 1905: Henry Hall published a Coptic ostracon donated to the British Museum after 1877
- 1921 and 1995: Walter Ewing Crum (transcription) and Sarah Clackson (translation and commentary) published three Coptic fragments acquired by Rusafjaell
- 1938: Reginald Engelbach published a Coptic ostraca discovered by Clermont-Ganneau and Clédat
- 1939: Ewing Crum published a Coptic fragment donated to the Bristol Museum in 1930
- 1977: Fritz Hintze published the Coptic ostraca unearthed in the 1907–08 German excavations

Arabic

- 1937: A fragment given to the Hamburg museum in 1911 was published in 1937
- 1941: A fragment given to the Chicago museum in 1920 was published in 1941

Latin

- 1979: Two Latin fragments discovered by Rubensohn in 1907 were published in 1979

== Jewish documents ==
=== Historical significance ===
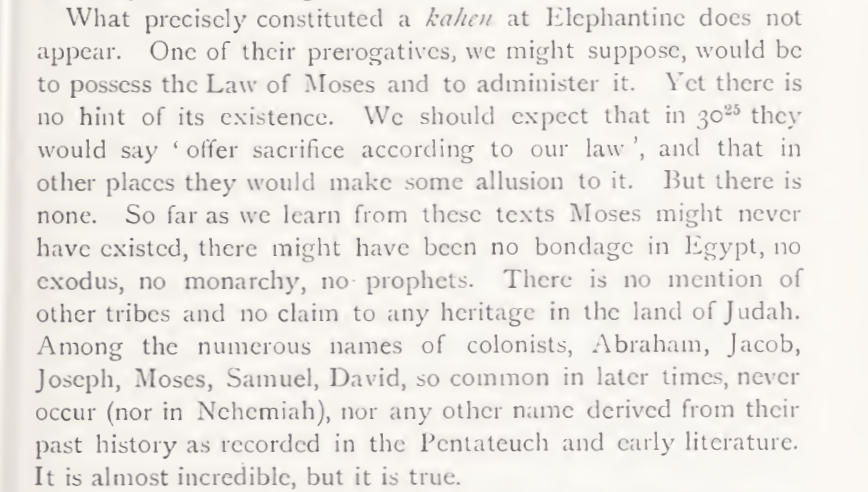
As shocking sometimes as what was in the papyri, says Cowley, was what wasn't.

The Elephantine papyri pre-date all extant manuscripts of the Hebrew Bible, and thus give scholars a very important glimpse at how Judaism was practiced in Egypt during the fifth century BCE, as they seem to show evidence of the existence in c. 400 BCE of a pluralistic sect of Jews, revering deities alongside Yahweh. With papyrus that mention YHW/Yahu being invoked in blessings alongside other gods like Baal, Pidray, Bel, Nabu, Nane, and Asherah. It is widely agreed that this Elephantine community originated in the mid-seventh or mid-sixth centuries BCE, likely as a result of Judean and Samaritan refugees fleeing into Egypt during the times of Assyrian and Babylonian invasions. They seem to have had no knowledge of a written Torah or the narratives described therein.

Also important is the fact that the papyri document the existence of a small Jewish temple at Elephantine, which possessed altars for incense offerings and animal sacrifices, as late as 411 BCE. Such a temple would be in clear violation of Deuteronomic law, which stipulates that no Jewish temple may be constructed outside of Jerusalem. Furthermore, the papyri show that the Jews at Elephantine sent letters to the high priest in Jerusalem asking for his support in re-building their temple, which seems to suggest that the priests of the Jerusalem Temple were not enforcing Deuteronomic law at that time. Cowley notes that their petition expressed their pride at having a temple to Ya'u (no other god is mentioned in the petition) and gave no suggestion that their temple could be heretical.

Upon first examination, this appears to contradict commonly accepted models of the development of Jewish religion and the dating of the Hebrew scriptures, which posit that monotheism and the Torah should have already been well-established by the time these papyri were written. Most scholars explain this apparent discrepancy by theorizing that the Elephantine Jews represented an isolated remnant of Jewish religious practices from earlier centuries, or that the Torah had only recently been promulgated at that time.

Niels Peter Lemche, Philippe Wajdenbaum, Russell Gmirkin, and Thomas L. Thompson have argued that the Elephantine papyri demonstrate that monotheism and the Torah could not have been established in Jewish culture before 400 BCE, and that the Torah was therefore likely written in the Hellenistic period, in the third or fourth centuries BCE. Yonatan Adler similarly argues that the Elephantine papyri alongside Persian era archaeological evidence, indicate that there was no practiced Torah observant Judaism, and he pushes the timeline for the observance of Torah laws to the Hasmonean period.

=== Jewish temple at Elephantine ===
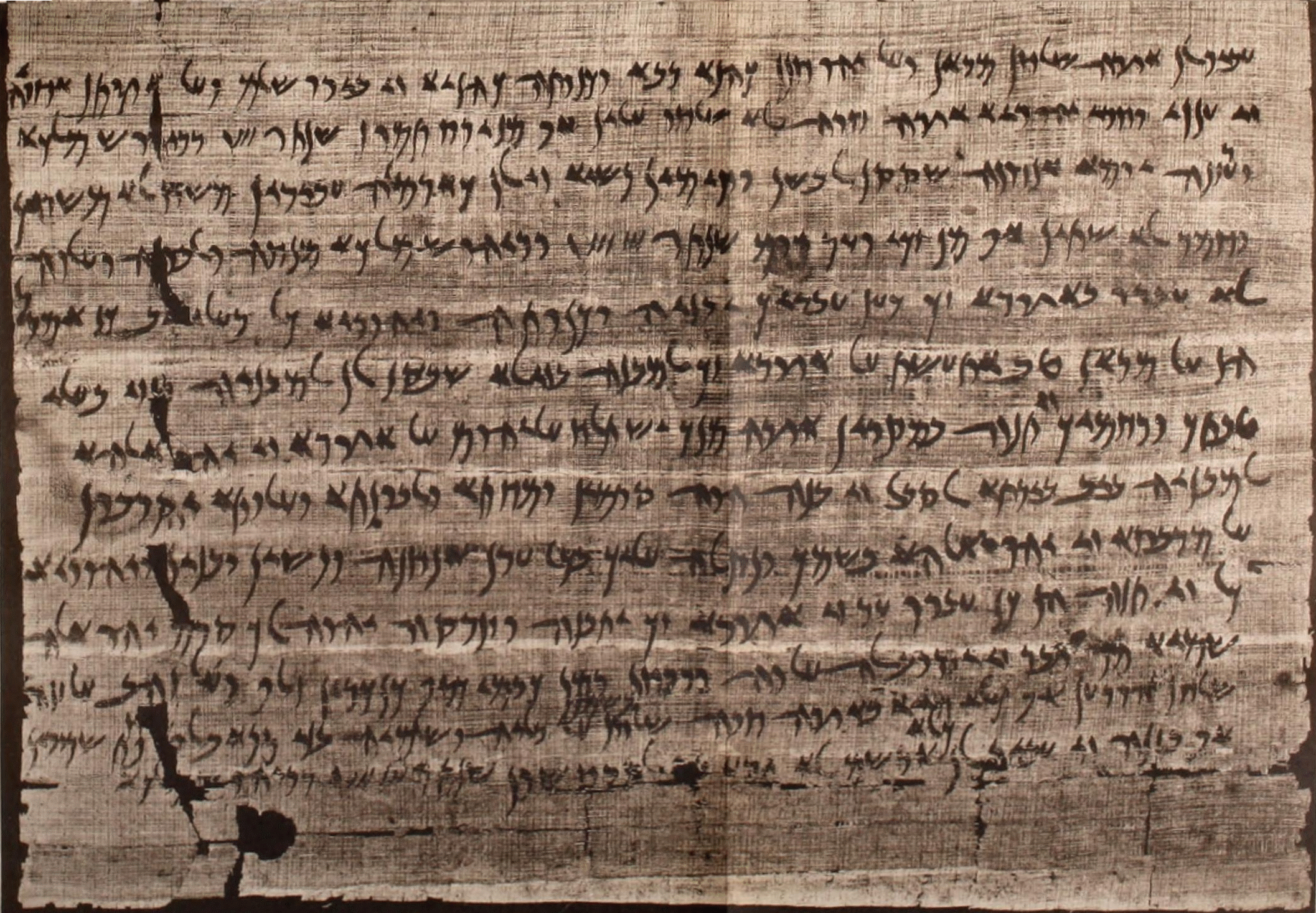
A letter from the Elephantine Papyri, requesting the rebuilding of a Jewish temple at Elephantine.

The Jews had their own temple to Yahweh which functioned alongside that of the Egyptian god Khnum. Along with Yahweh, other deities – ʿAnat Betel and Asham Bethel – seem to have been worshiped by these Jews, evincing polytheistic beliefs. Other scholars argue that these theonyms are merely hypostases of Yahweh, and dispute the idea that the Elephantine Jews were polytheists.

Excavation work done in 1967 revealed the remains of the Jewish colony centered on a small temple. The "Petition to Bagoas" (Sayce-Cowley collection) is a letter written in 407 BCE to Bagoas, the Persian governor of Judea, appealing for assistance in rebuilding the Jewish temple in Elephantine, which had recently been damaged by an Egyptian priestly faction of the Elephantine community.

In the course of this appeal, the Jewish inhabitants of Elephantine speak of the antiquity of the damaged temple:

Now our forefathers built this temple in the fortress of Elephantine back in the days of the kingdom of Egypt, and when Cambyses came to Egypt he found it built. They (the Persians) knocked down all the temples of the gods of Egypt, but no one did any damage to this temple.

The community also appealed for aid to Sanballat I, a Samaritan potentate, and his sons Delaiah and Shelemiah, as well as Johanan ben Eliashib. Both Sanballat and Johanan are mentioned in the Book of Nehemiah, 2:19, 12:23.

There was a response of both governors (Bagoas and Delaiah) which gave the permission by decree to rebuild the temple written in the form of a memorandum: "_{1}Memorandum of what Bagohi and Delaiah said _{2}to me, saying: Memorandum: You may say in Egypt ... _{8}to (re)build it on its site as it was formerly...".

By the middle of the 4th century BCE, the temple at Elephantine had ceased to function. There is evidence from excavations that the rebuilding and enlargement of the Khnum temple under Nectanebo II (360–343) took the place of the former temple of YHWH.

In 2004, the Brooklyn Museum created a display entitled "Jewish Life in Ancient Egypt: A Family Archive From the Nile Valley," which featured the interfaith couple of Ananiah, an official at the temple of Yahou (a.k.a. Yahweh), and his wife, Tamut, who was previously an Egyptian slave owned by an Aramean master, Meshullam. Some related exhibition didactics of 2002 included comments about significant structural similarities between Judaism and the ancient Egyptian religion and how they easily coexisted and blended at Elephantine.

=== Anat-Yahu ===
The papyri suggest that, "Even in exile and beyond, the veneration of a female deity endured." The texts were written by a group of Jews living at Elephantine near the Nubian border, whose religion has been described as "nearly identical to Iron Age II Judahite religion". The papyri describe the Jews as worshiping Anat-Yahu (mentioned in the document AP 44, line 3, in Cowley's numbering). Anat-Yahu is described as either the wife (or paredra, sacred consort) of Yahweh or as a hypostatized aspect of Yahweh.

=== The family archive of Ananiah and Tamut ===
The eight papyri contained at the Brooklyn Museum concern one particular Jewish family, providing specific information about the daily lives of a man called Ananiah, a Jewish temple official; his wife, Tamut, an Egyptian slave; and their children, over the course of forty-seven years. Egyptian farmers discovered the archive of Ananiah and Tamut on Elephantine Island in 1893, while digging for fertilizer in the remains of ancient mud-brick houses. They found at least eight papyrus rolls which were purchased by Charles Edwin Wilbour. He was the first person to find Aramaic papyri. The papyri have been grouped here by topic, such as marriage contract, real estate transaction, or loan agreement.

==== Marriage document ====
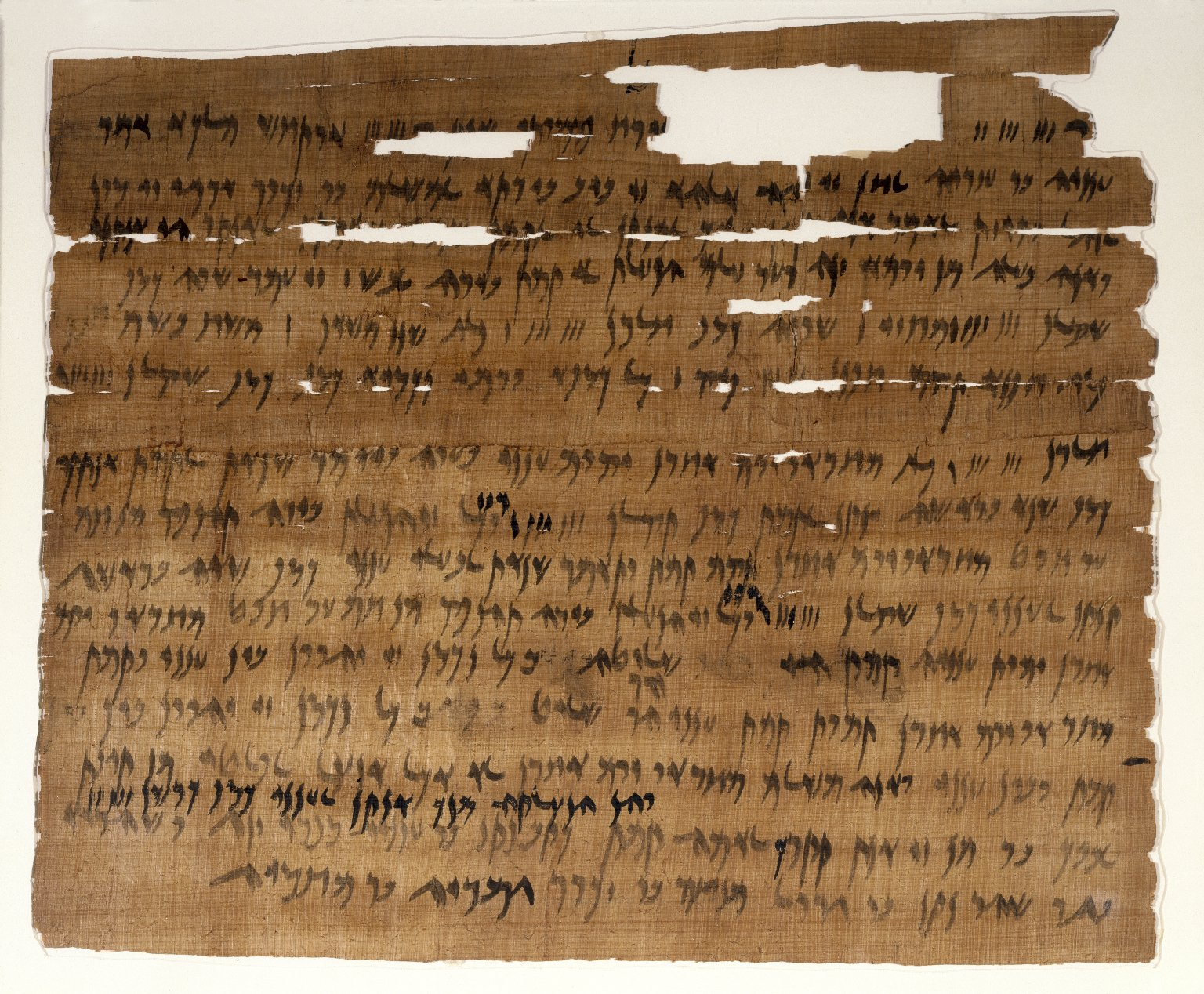
Marriage Document of Ananiah and Tamut, July 3, 449 BCE, Brooklyn Museum

Ancient marriage documents generally formalized already existing relationships. In this case, Ananiah and Tamut already had a young son when the document was drawn up. Because Tamut was a slave when she married Ananiah, the contract has special conditions: usually, it was the groom and his father-in-law who made Jewish marriage agreements, but Ananiah made this contract with Tamut's master, Meshullam, who legally was her father. In addition, special provision was made to free the couple's son, also a slave to Meshullam; perhaps Ananiah consented to the small dowry of either 7 or 15 shekels (the text is ambiguous) in order to obtain his son's freedom. Future children, however, would still be born slaves. In contrast to Jewish documents like this one, contemporaneous Egyptian marriage documents were negotiated between a husband and wife.

==== Deed of Emancipation ====
Nearly twenty-two years after her marriage to Ananiah, Tamut's master released her and her daughter, Yehoishema, from slavery. It was rare for a slave to be freed. And though a slave could marry a free person, their children usually belonged to the master. As an institution, slavery in Egypt at that time differed in notable ways from the practice in some other cultures: Egyptian slaves retained control over personal property, had professions, and were entitled to compensation. During the Persian Period in Egypt, it was not uncommon to sell children, or even oneself, into slavery to pay debts.

==== Real estate documents ====
===== Bagazust and Ubil sell a house to Ananiah =====
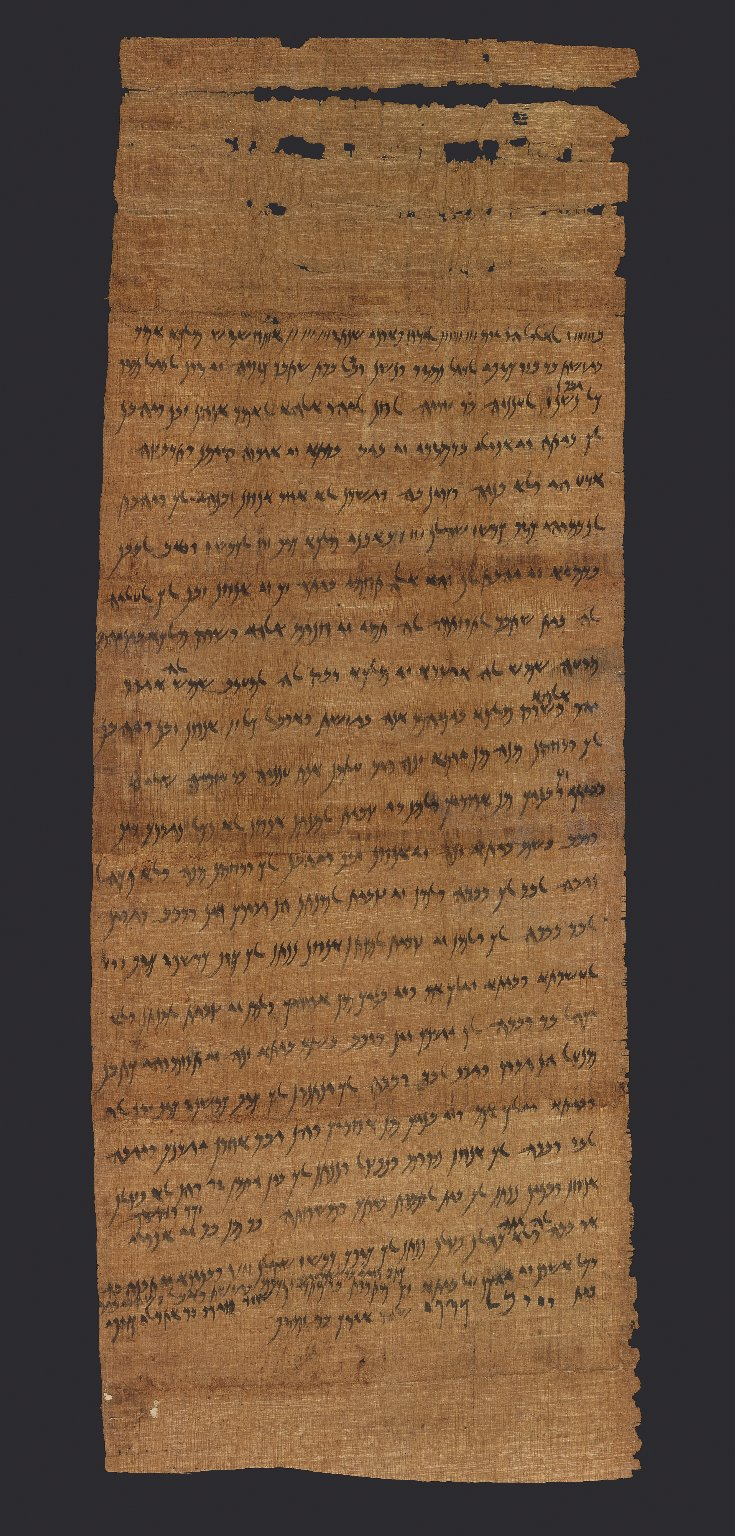
Property Sale Document: Bagazust and Ubil Sell a House to Ananiah, September 14, 437 BCE Brooklyn Museum

This document to the right describes a property purchased by Ananiah, twelve years after his marriage, from a Persian soldier named Bagazust and his wife, Ubil. The property, in a town on Elephantine Island, named for the god Khnum, was located across the street from the Temple of Yauh and adjacent to the Persian family of Ubil's father. As such proximity might suggest, the Egyptians, Jews, and Persians in Elephantine all lived among one another. The renovation of the house and its gradual transfers to family members are the central concerns of the next several documents in Ananiah's family archive.

===== Ananiah gives Tamut part of the house =====
Three years after purchasing the house from Bagazust and Ubil, Ananiah transferred ownership of an apartment within the now renovated house to his wife, Tamut. Although Tamut thereafter owned the apartment, Ananiah required that at her death it pass to their children, Palti and Yehoishema. As with all property transfers within a family, this gift was described as made "in love".

===== Ananiah gives Yehoishema part of the house =====
Drawn up thirty years after the preceding papyrus, this document is one of several that gradually transferred ownership of Ananiah and Tamut's house to their daughter, Yehoishema, as payment on her dowry. The legal descriptions of the house preserve the names of Ananiah's neighbors. They included an Egyptian who held the post of gardener of the Egyptian god Khnum and, on the other side, two Persian boatmen. Image of document in gallery.

===== Ananiah gives Yehoishema another part of the house =====
For his daughter Yehoishema's dowry, Ananiah had transferred to her partial ownership of the house he shared with Tamut. After making more repairs to the building, Ananiah transferred a further section of the house, described in this document, to the dowry. Image of document in gallery.

===== Ananiah and Tamut sell the house to their son-in-law =====
This papyrus records the sale of the remaining portion of Ananiah and Tamut's house to Yehoishema's husband. Possibly because the clients were dissatisfied with something the scribe had written, at one point the text of the document breaks off and then starts over again, repeating what has gone on before with some additions. The boundary description included here refers to the Temple of Yauh in Elephantine, now rebuilt eight years after its destruction in 410 BCE during a civil war conflict that arose out of a land dispute. Image of document in gallery below.

==== Loan agreement ====
Sometime in December 402 BCE, Ananiah son of Haggai borrowed two monthly rations of grain from Pakhnum son of Besa, an Aramean with an Egyptian name. This receipt would have been held by Pakhnum and returned to Ananiah son of Haggai when he repaid the loan. No interest is charged but there is a penalty for failing to repay the loan by the agreed date. The receipt demonstrates that friendly business relations continued between Egyptians and Jews in Elephantine after the expulsion of the Persians by Amyrtaeus, the only pharaoh of the Twenty-eighth Dynasty of Egypt. Image of document is in gallery below.

== Gallery ==
=== Brooklyn Museum ===
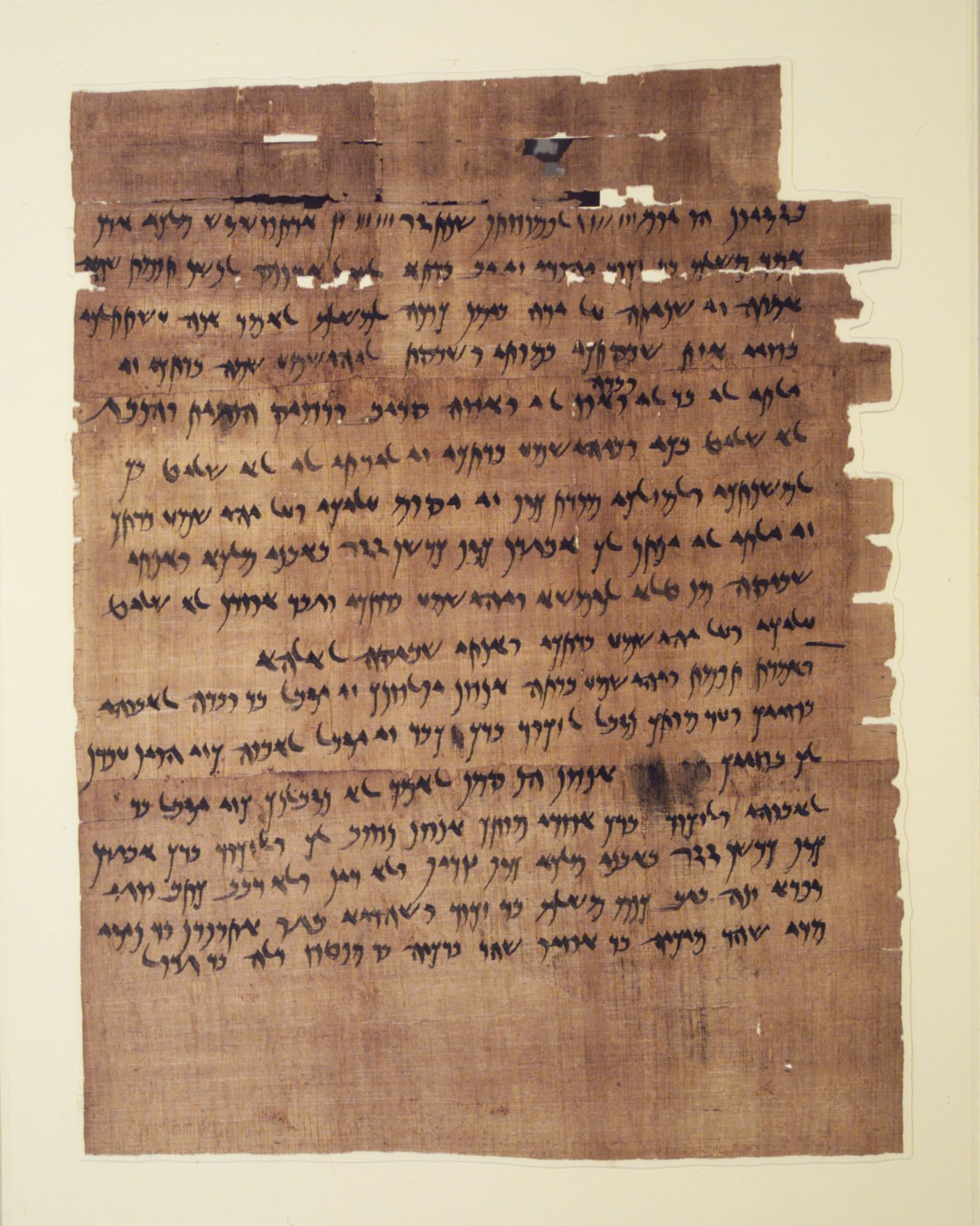
Freedom for Tamut and Yehoishema, June 12, 427 BCE, Brooklyn Museum

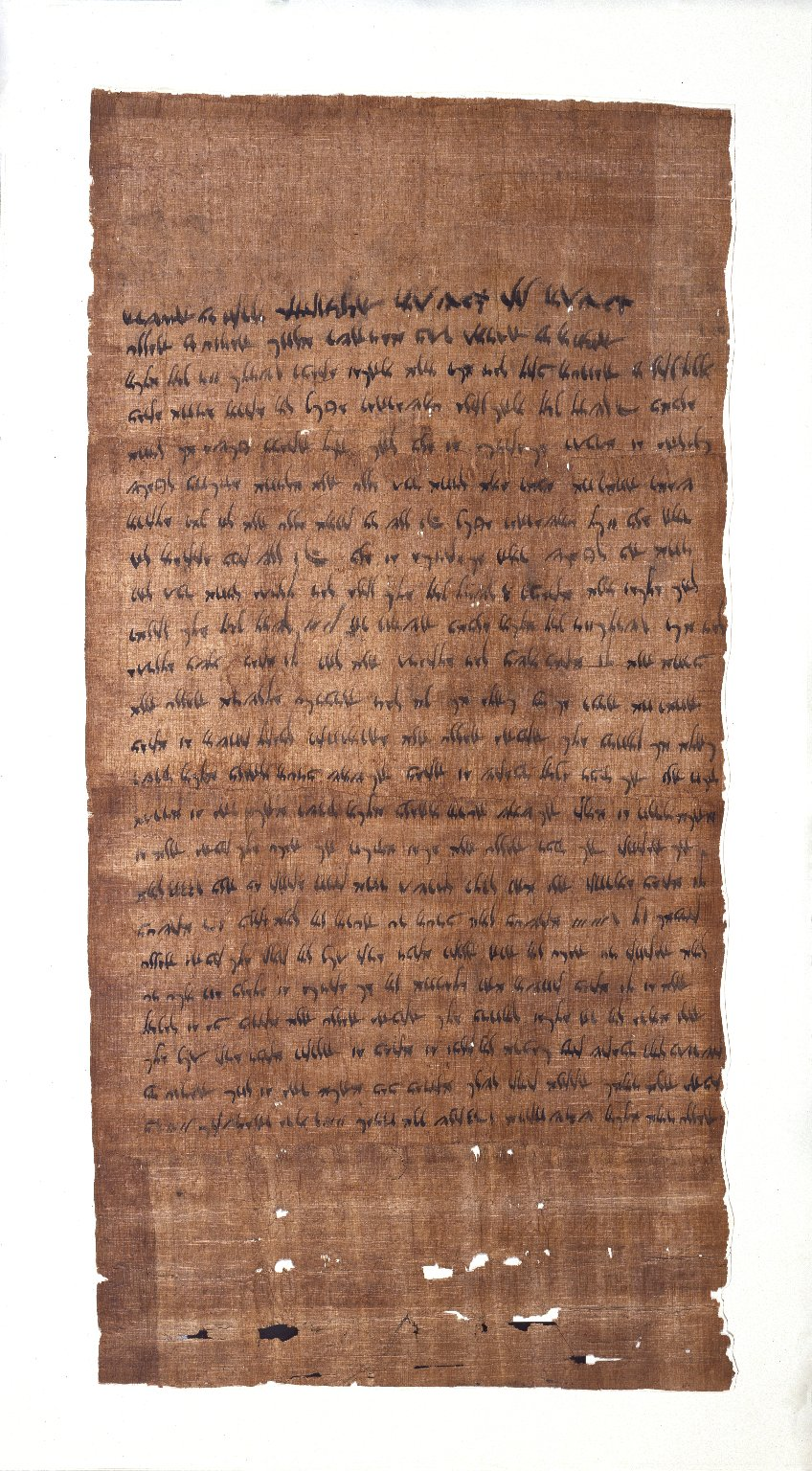
Ananiah Gives Tamut Part of the House, October 30, 434 BCE, Brooklyn Museum

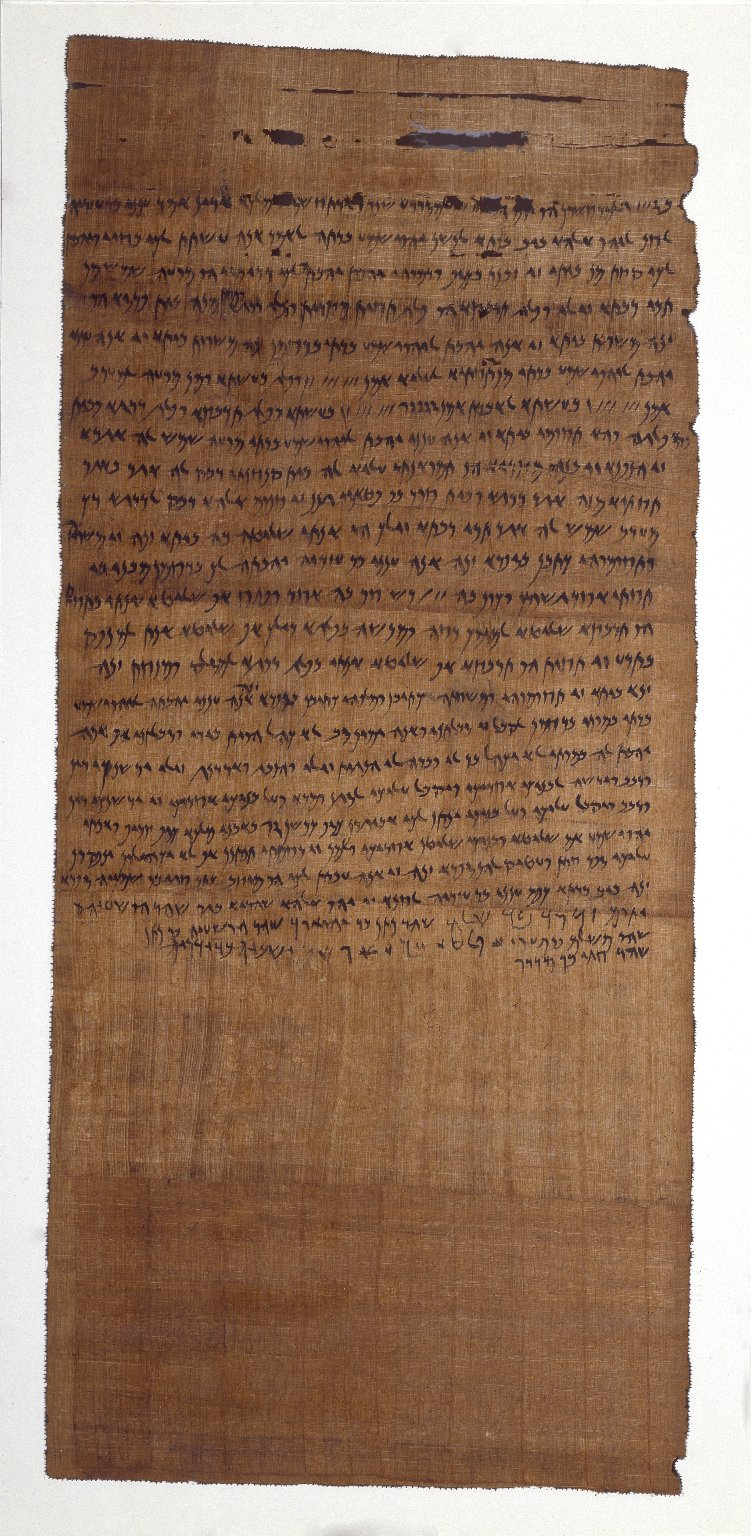
Ananiah Gives Yehoishema Part of the House, November 26, 404 BCE, Brooklyn Museum

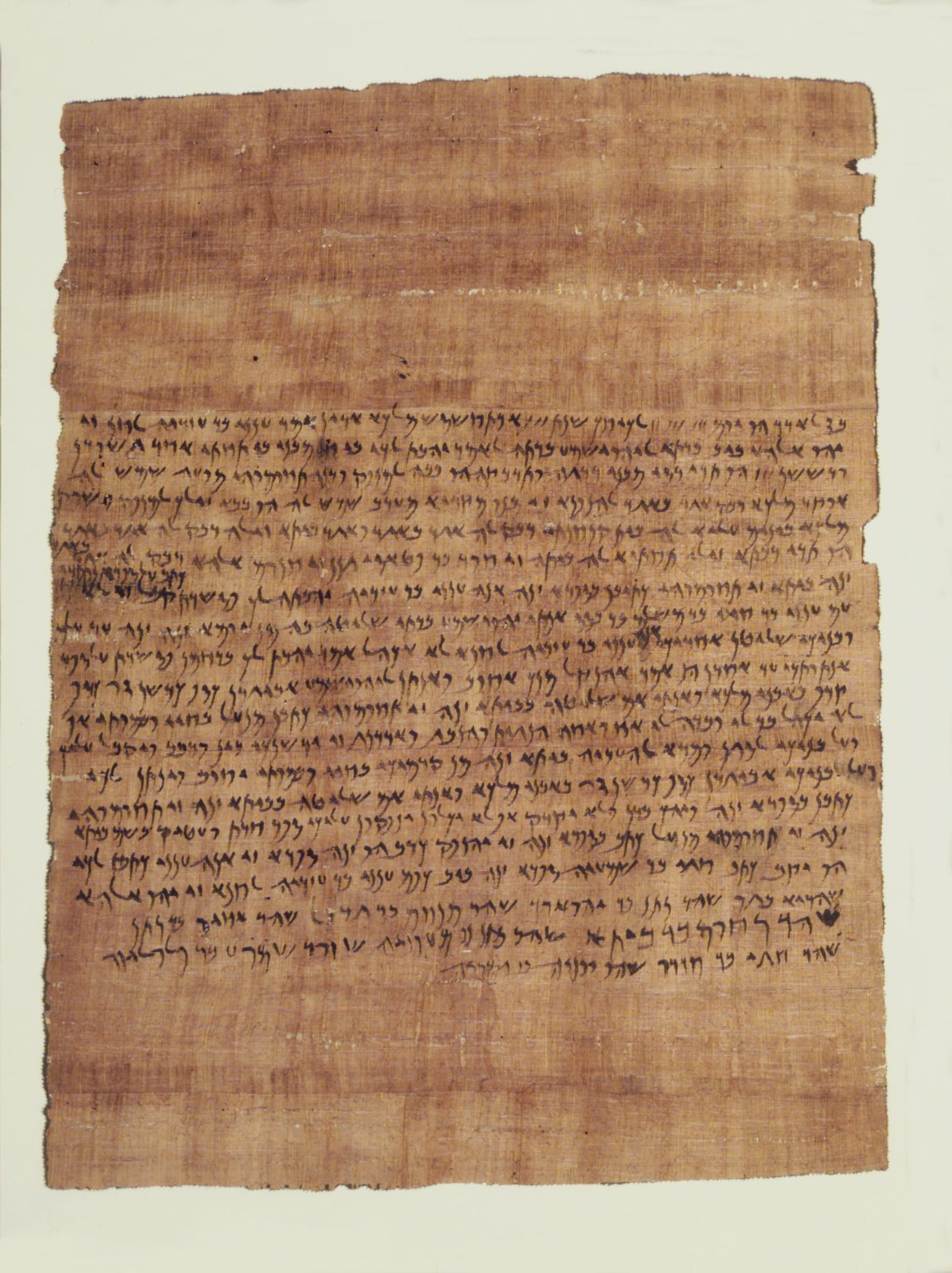
Ananiah Gives Yehoishema Another Part of the House, March 10, 402 BCE, Brooklyn Museum

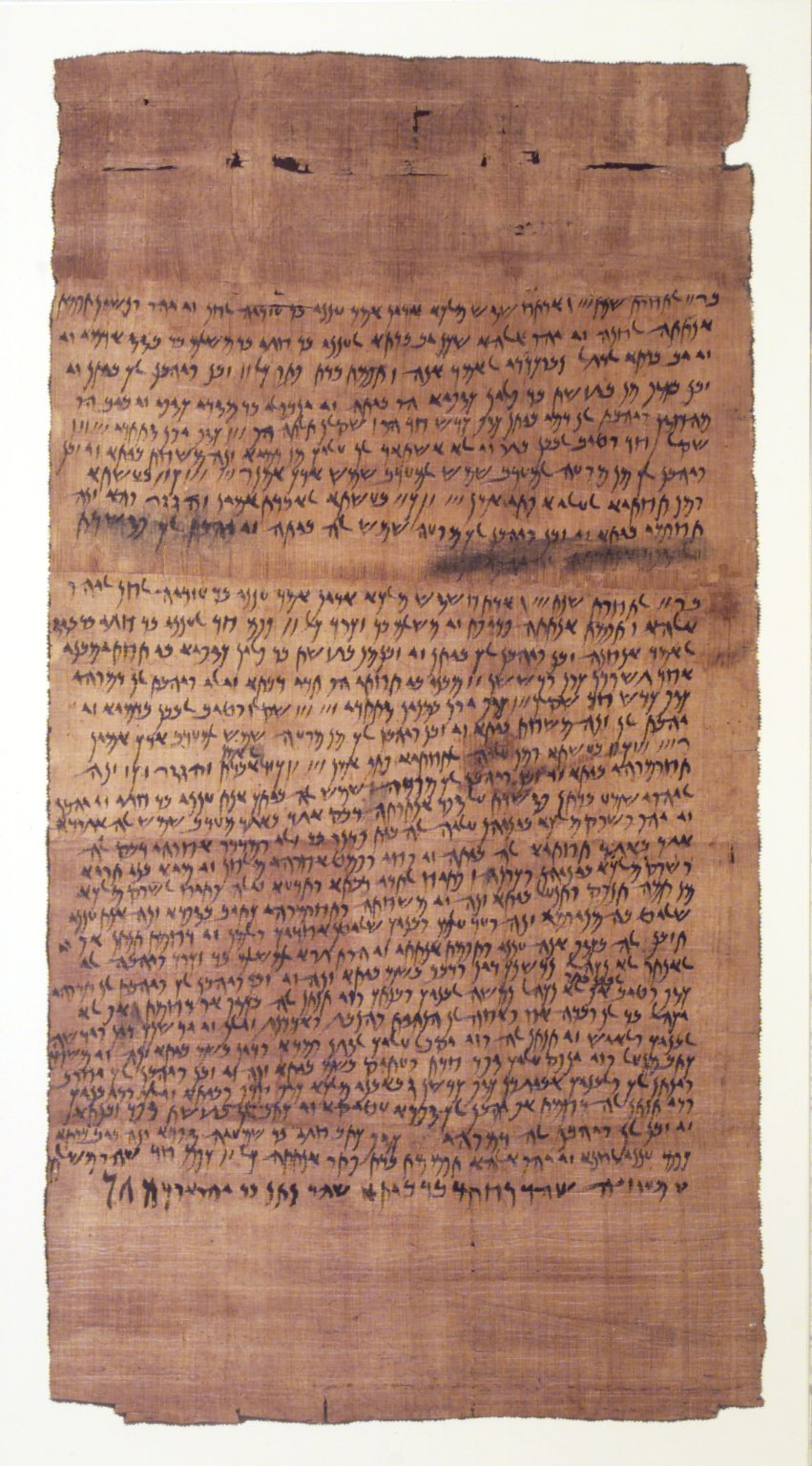
House Sale, December 12, 402 BCE, Brooklyn Museum

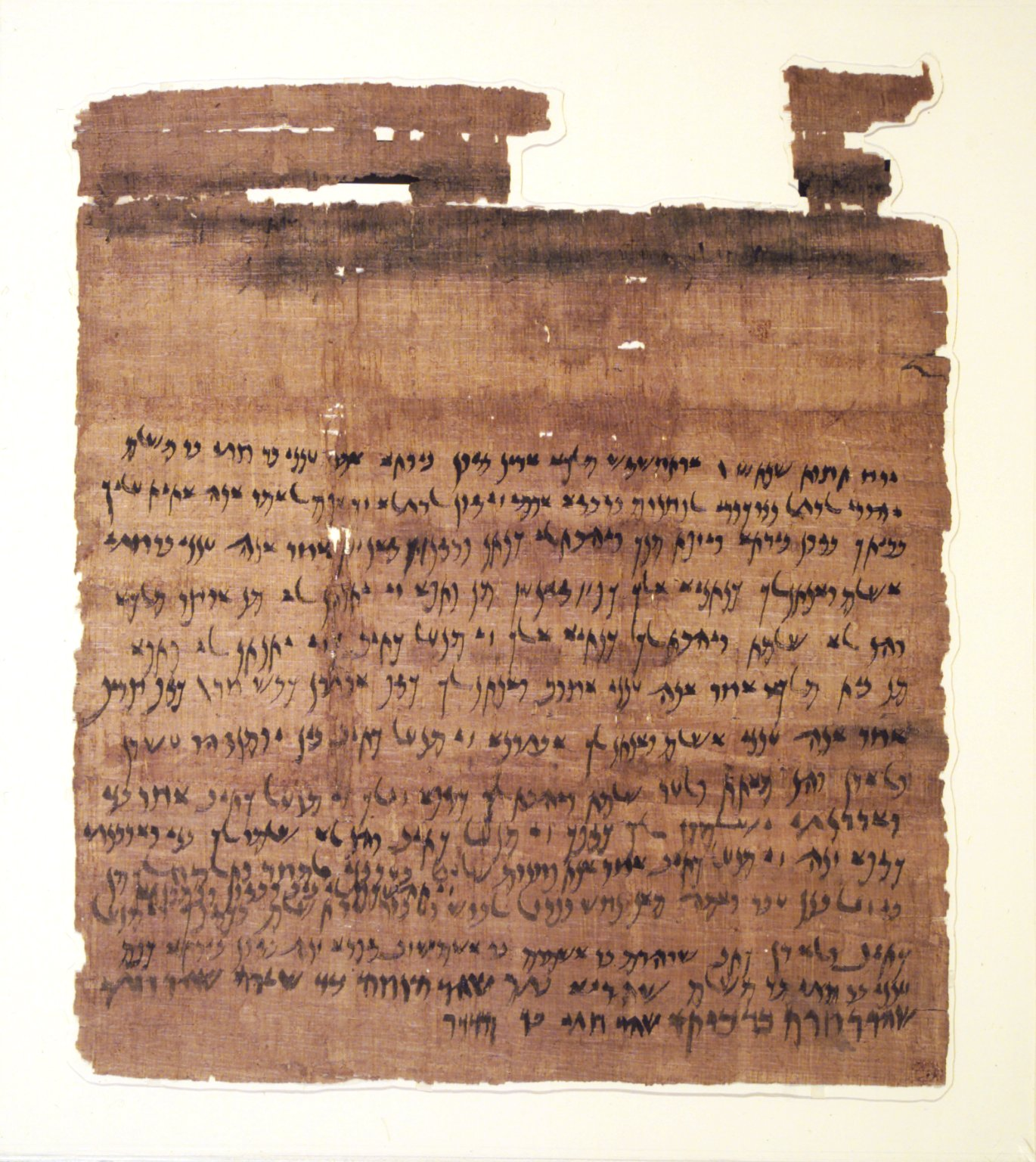
Receipt for a Grain Loan, December 402 BCE, Brooklyn Museum

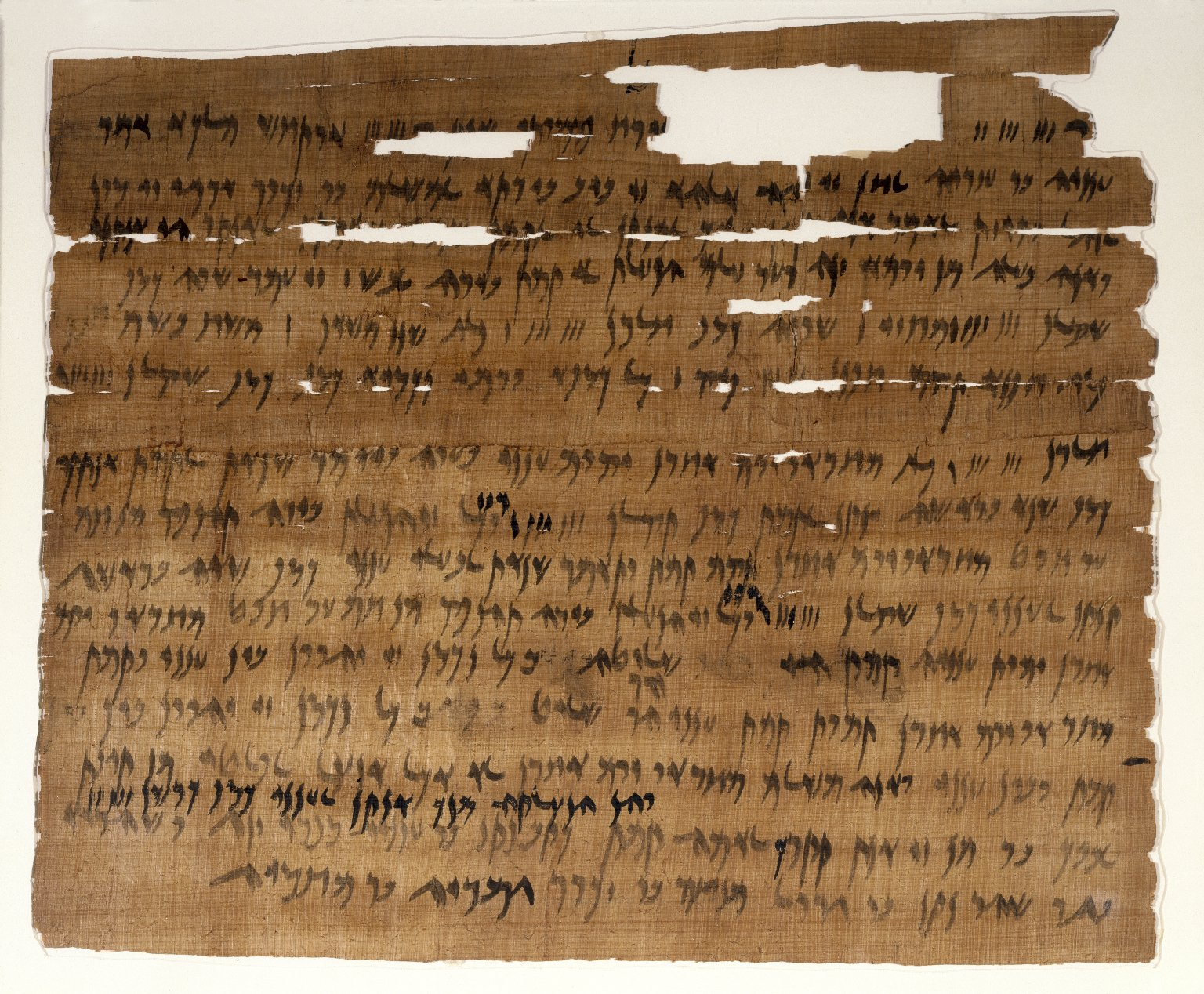
Aramaic Marriage Document, 449 B.C.E. Brooklyn Museum

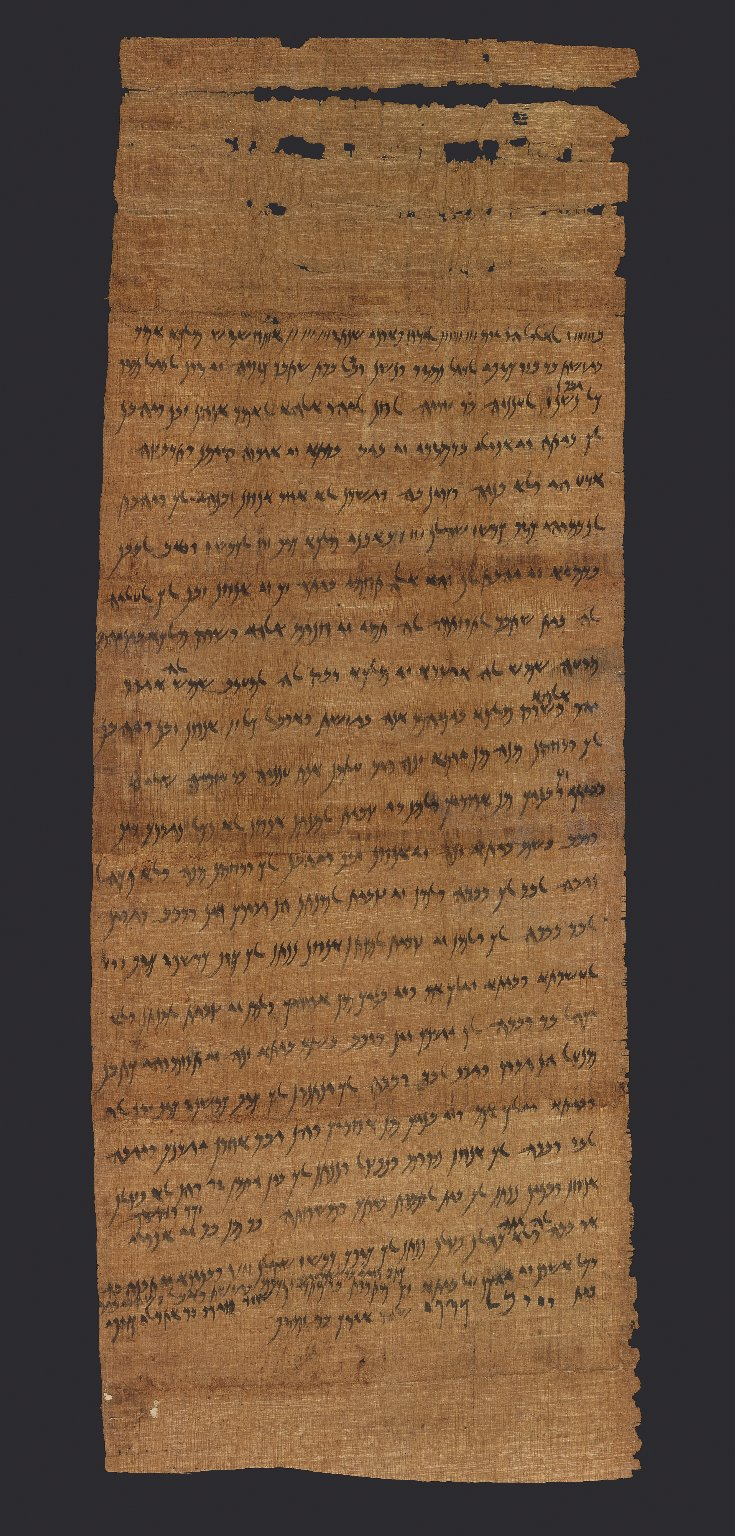
Aramaic Property Sale Document: Bagazust and Ubil Sell a House to Ananiah, 437 B.C.E. Brooklyn Museum

=== Egyptian Museum of Berlin ===
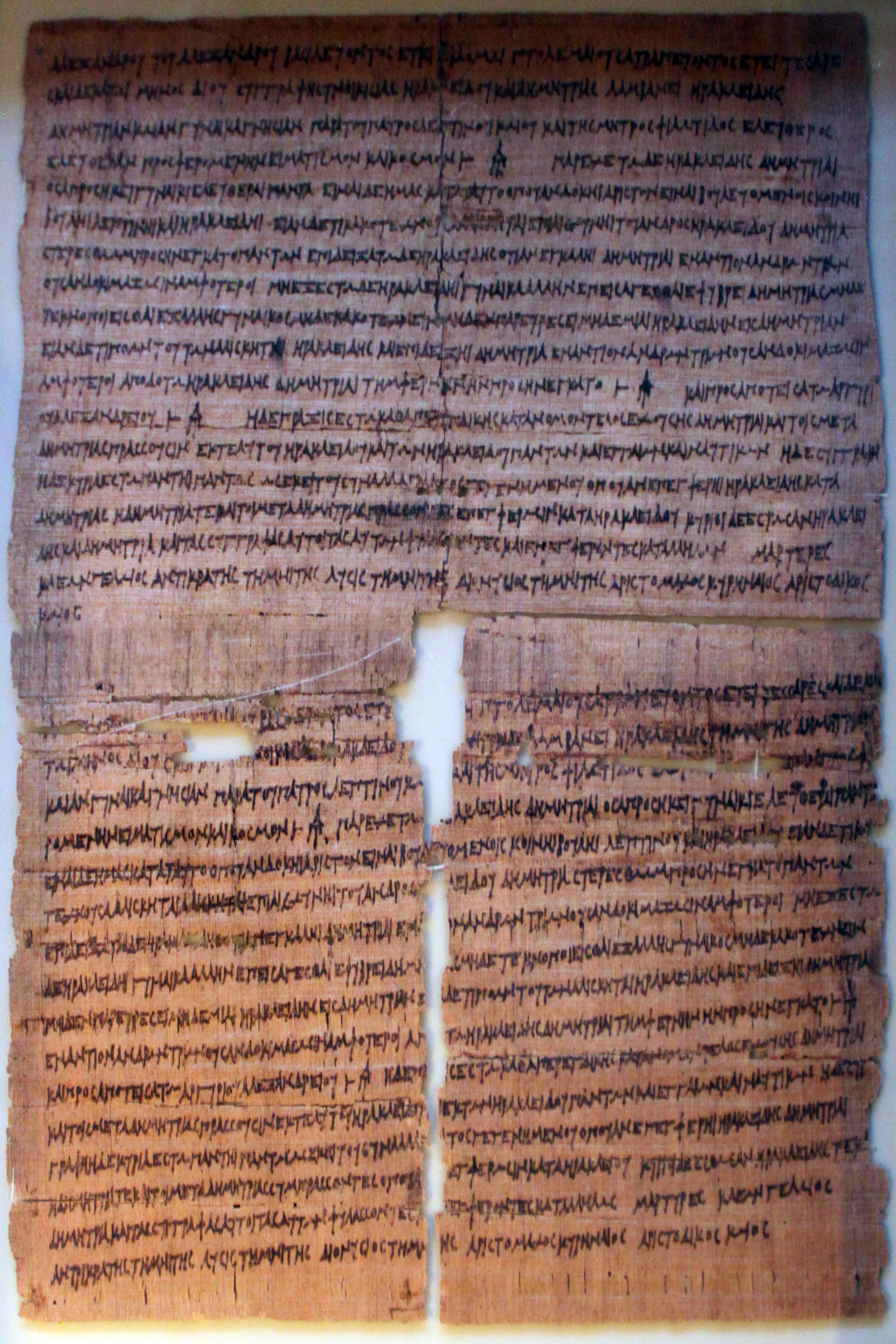
Marriage contract between Greeks, Egyptian Museum of Berlin, 310 BC; P 13500

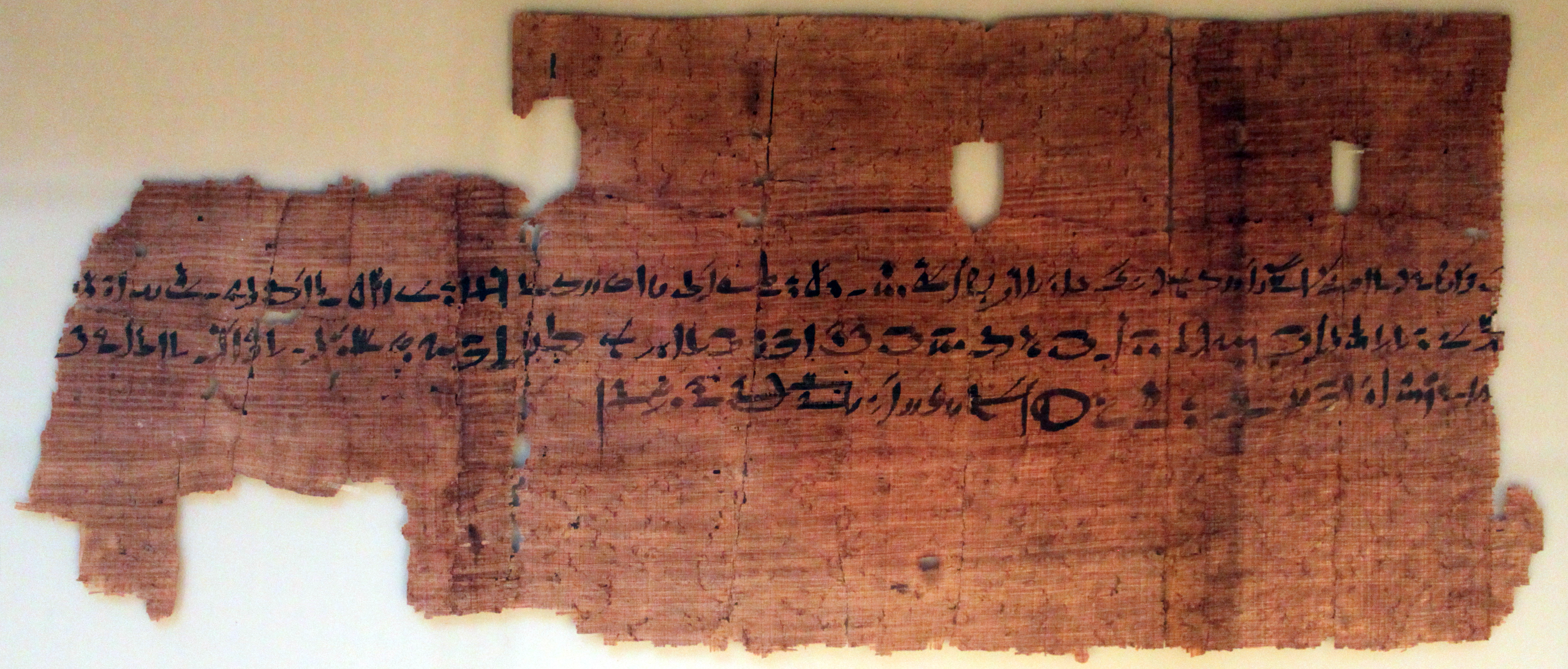
Marriage contract between Egyptians, Egyptian Museum of Berlin, demotic; 535 BC (26th dynasty); P 13614

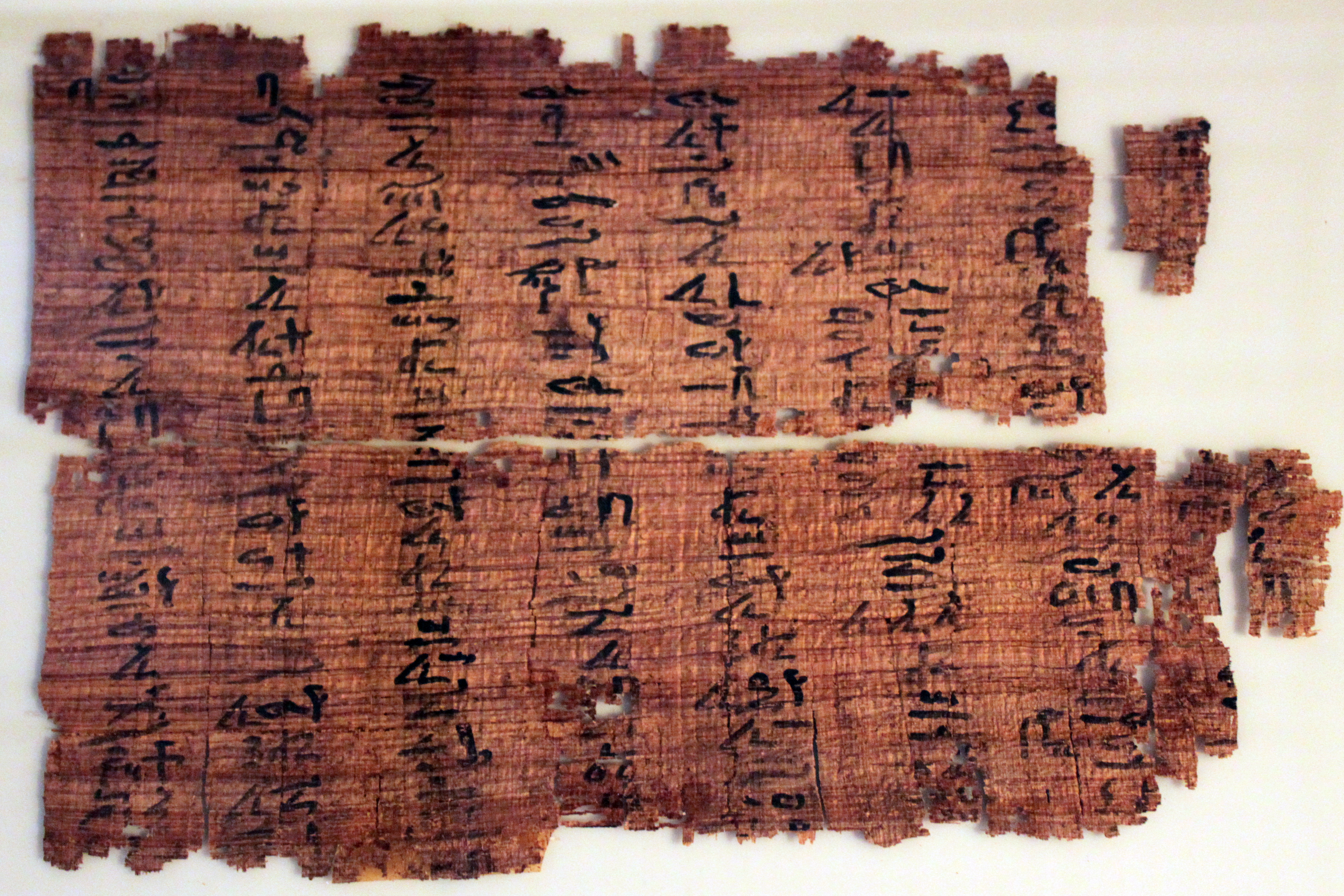
Court judgment in an inheritance dispute, Egyptian Museum of Berlin, hieratic; Old Kingdom (2.300 BC); P 9010

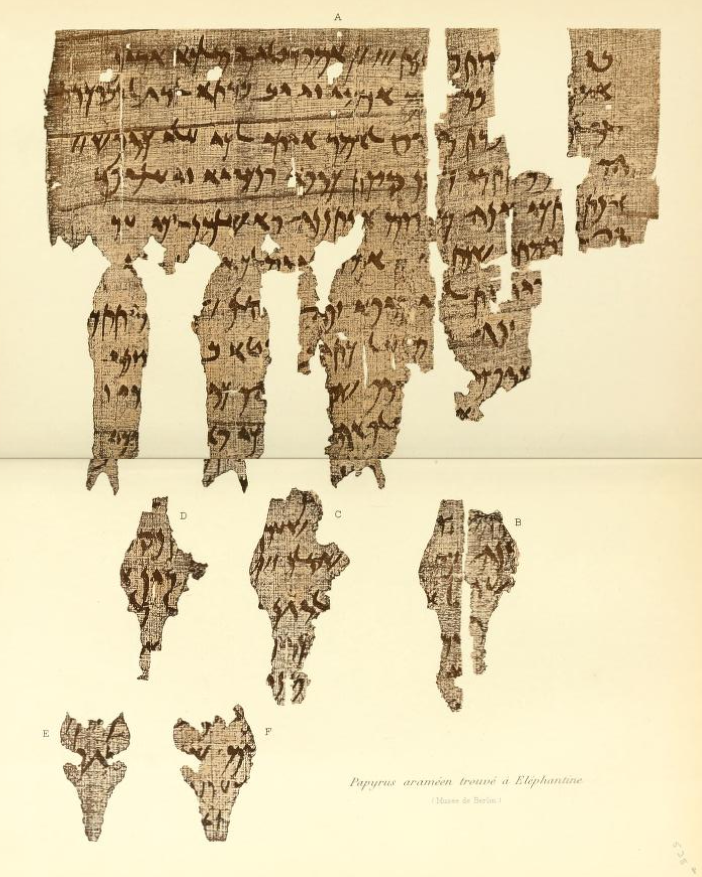
Aramaic papyrus containing a contract for a loan, dated to regnal year 5 of pharaoh Amyrtaios, in 400 BCE, Egyptian Museum of Berlin

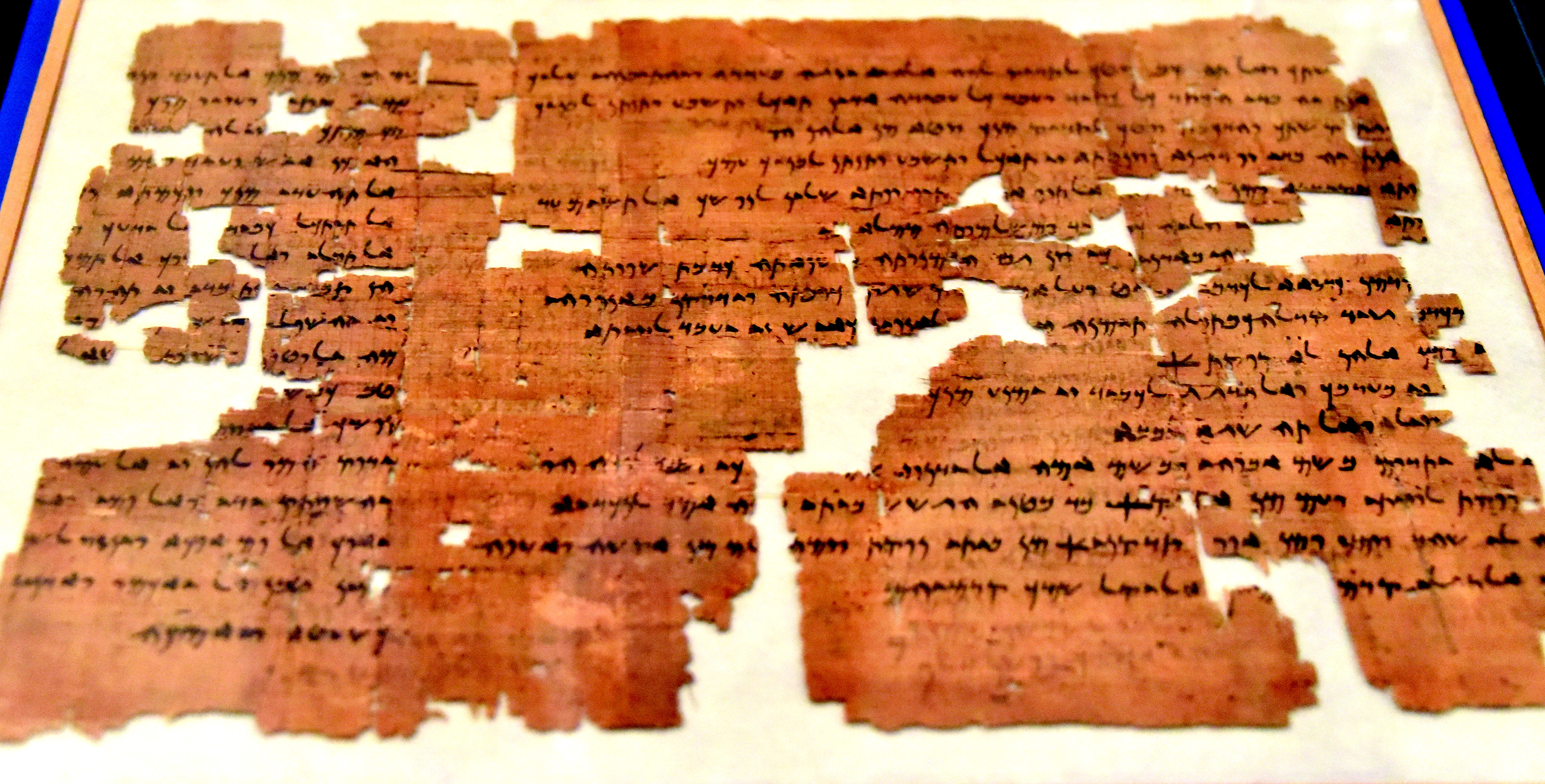
Aramaic Papyrus with Story of Ahikar, 5th century BCE, Egyptian Museum of Berlin

=== Egyptian Museum, Cairo ===
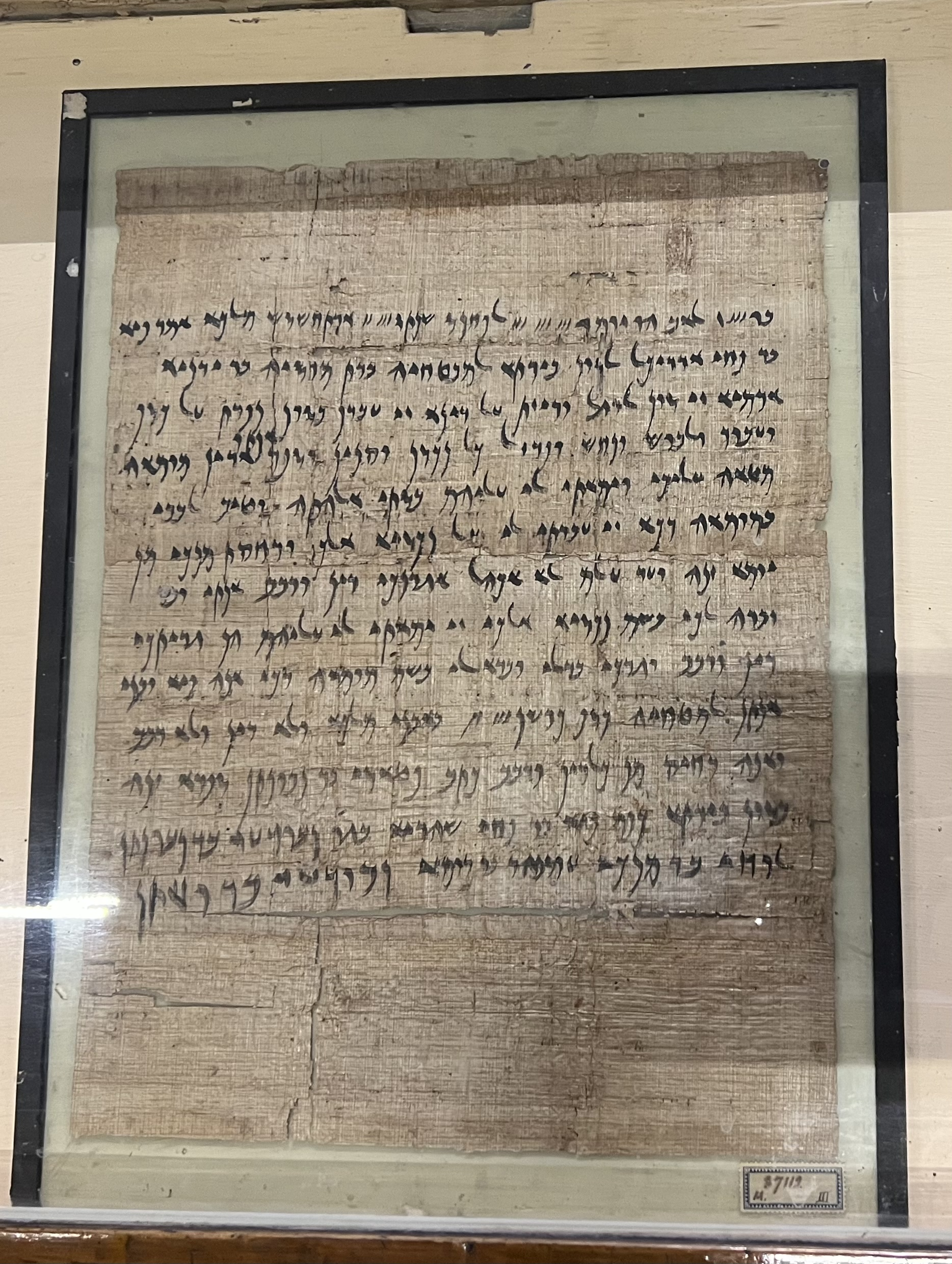
Elephantine papyrus J 37112 (Sayce and Cowley 1906, F) from the Mibtahiah archive

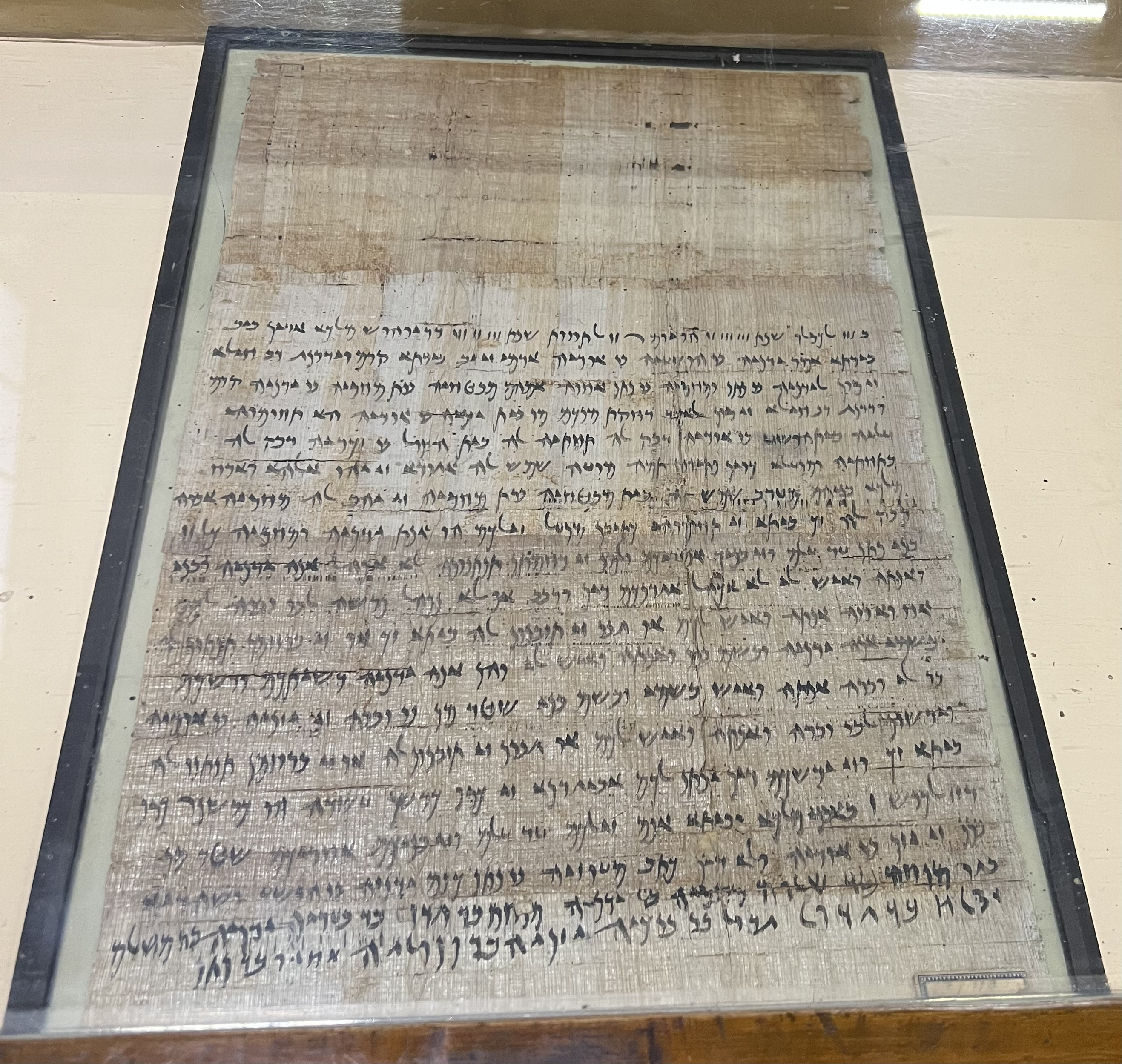
Elephantine papyrus J 37113 (Sayce and Cowley 1906, J) from the Mibtahiah archive

=== Other ===
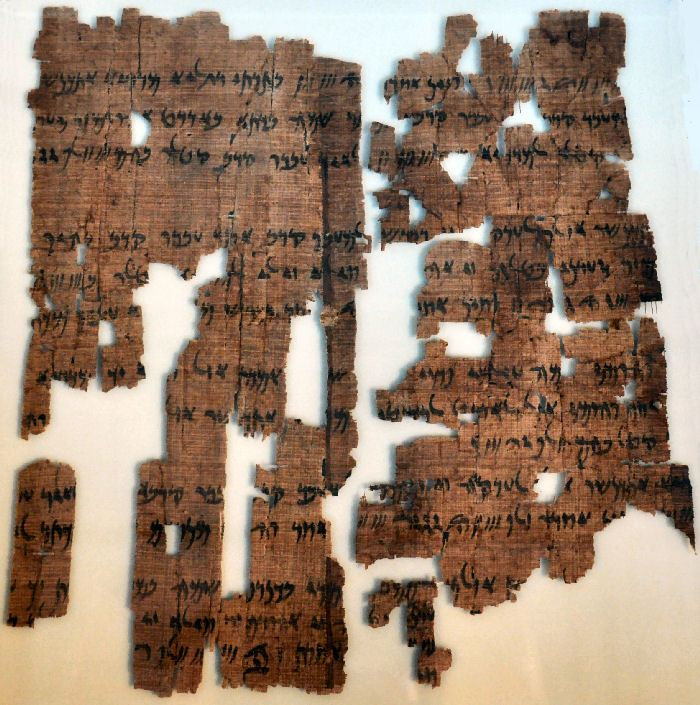
The Behistun papyrus, an Aramaic translation of the Behistun inscription on Papyrus, 520 BCE

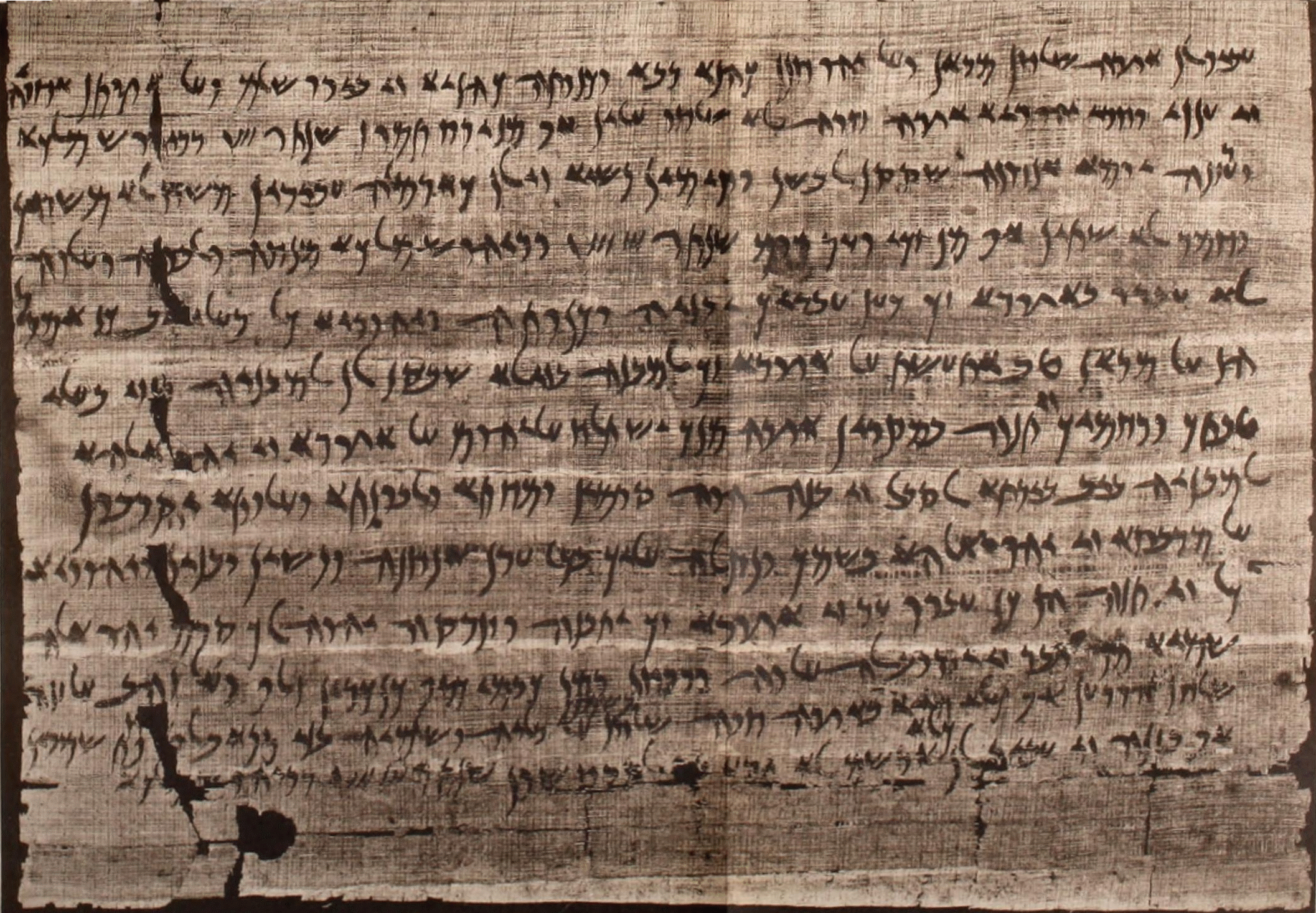
Letter from the Elephantine Papyri, a collection of 5th century BCE writings of the Jewish community at Elephantine in Egypt. Authors are Yedoniah and his colleagues the priests and it is addressed to Bagoas, governor of Judah. The letter is a request for the rebuilding of a Jewish temple at Elephantine, which had been destroyed by Egyptian pagans. The letter is dated year 17 of king Darius (II) under the rule of the satrap of Egypt Arsames, which corresponds to 407 BCE. From Eduard Sachau's 1907 publication

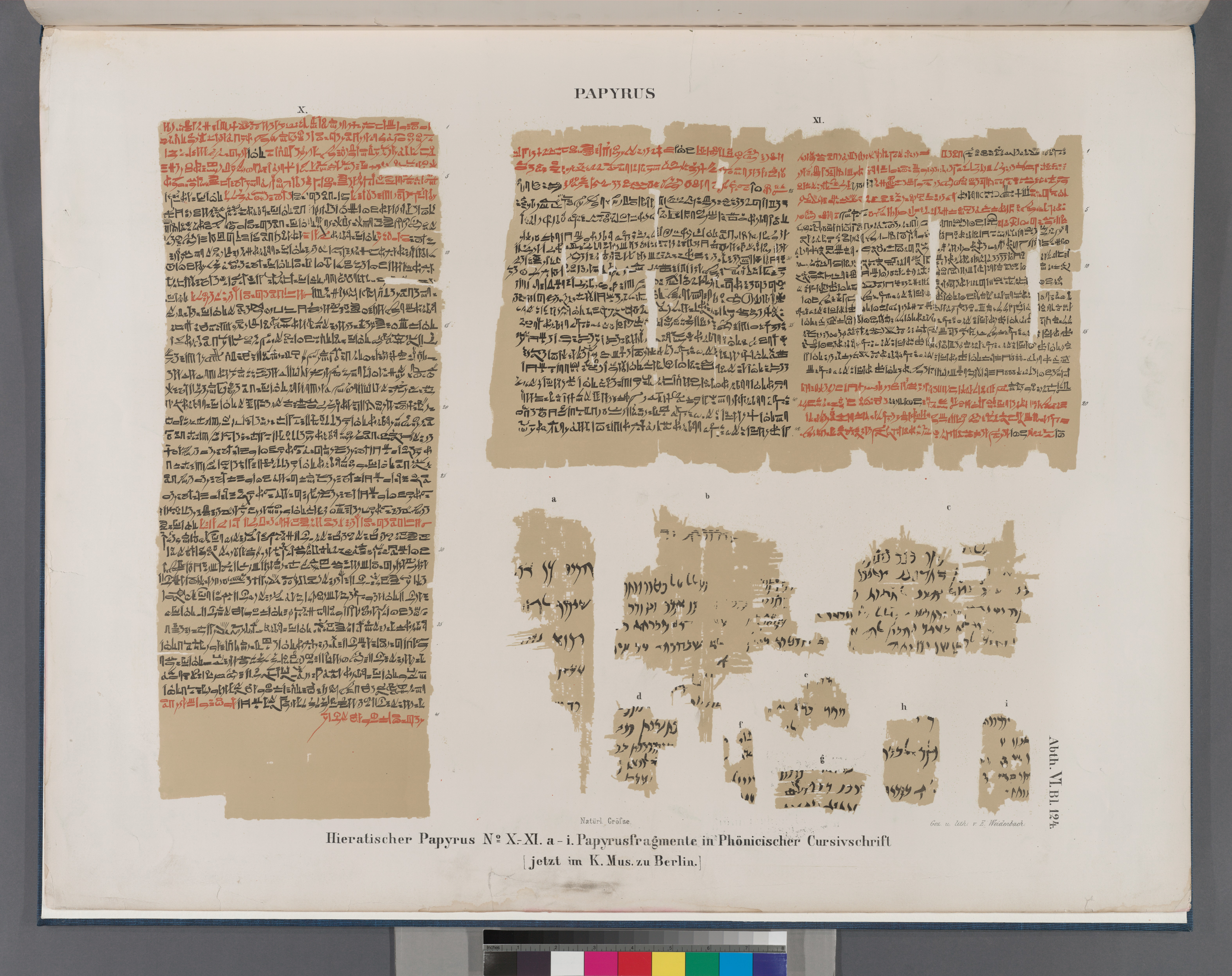
Phoenician-Aramaic papyrus CIS II 149 and Cowley 69; Cowley suggested they came from Elephantine.

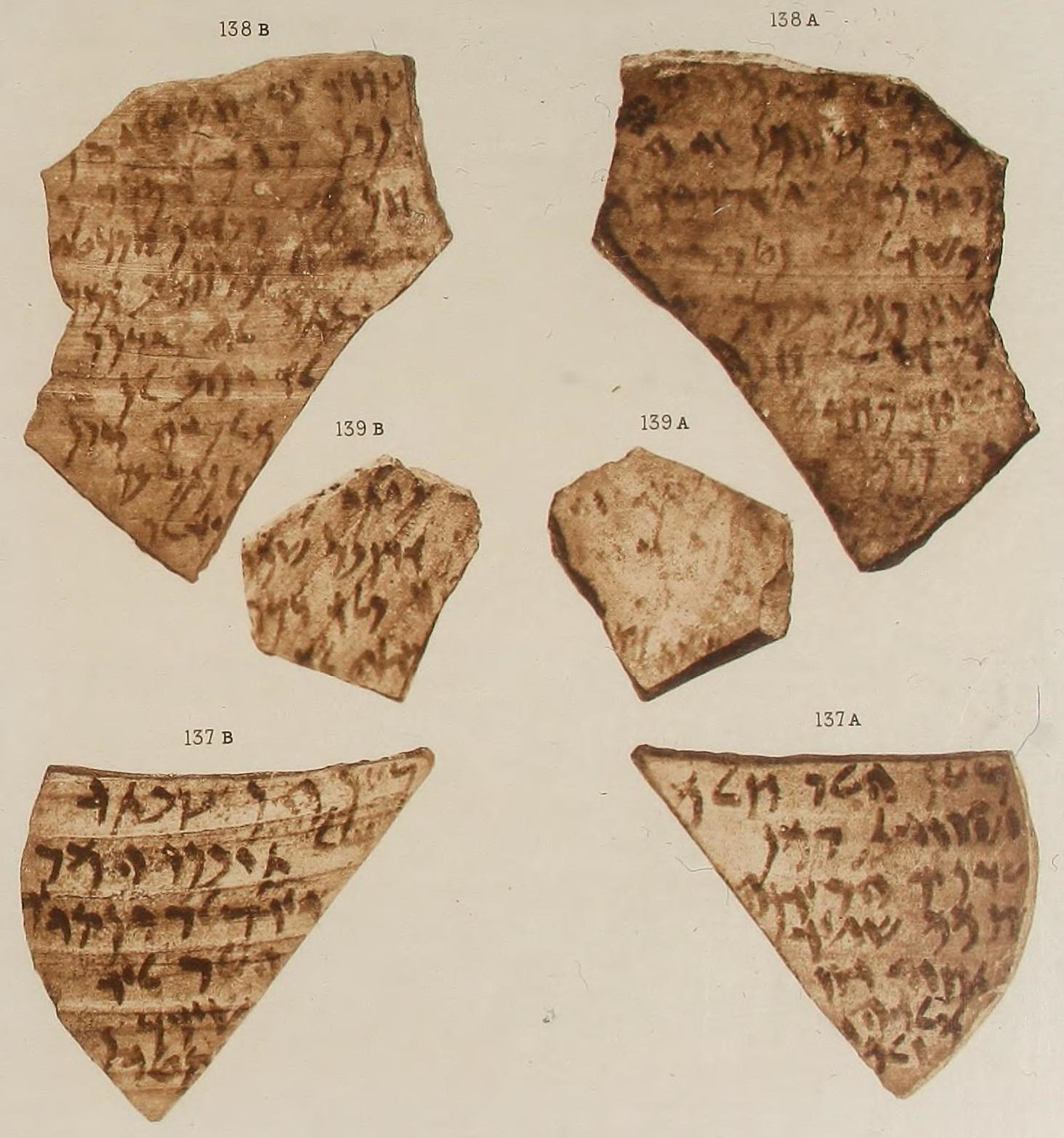
Greville Chester Aramaic ostraca (CIS II 138–139) and Dream Ostracon (CIS II 137)

== See also ==
- Afghan Geniza, similar cache of ancient religious and secular documents
- Astarte and the Insatiable Sea
- Blacas papyri
- Cairo Geniza, similar cache of ancient religious and secular documents
- Dunhuang manuscripts, similar cache of ancient religious and secular documents
- Herculaneum papyri, similar cache of ancient religious and secular documents
- Land of Onias, another temple of YHWH in Egypt (170 BCE – 73 CE)
- Papyrus Amherst 63, perhaps originating in the Jewish Elephantine community
- Timbuktu manuscripts

== Bibliography ==
=== Primary scholarly sources ===
- Euting Julius. Notice sur un papyrus égypto-araméen de la Bibliothèque impériale de Strasbourg, Mémoires présentés par divers savants à l'Académie des inscriptions et belles-lettres de l'Institut de France. Première série, Sujets divers d'érudition. Tome 11, 2e partie, 1904. pp. 297–312; DOI: https://doi.org/10.3406/mesav.1904.1089
- Arthur Ungnad, Aramäische Papyrus aus Elephantine
- Eduard Sachau, 1908, Drei aramäische papyrusurkunden aus Elephantine
- Eduard Sachau, 1911, Aramäische Papyrus und Ostraka aus einer jüdischen Militär-Kolonie zu Elephantine
  - Text
  - Plates
- Cowley, Arthur, The Aramaic Papyri of the Fifth Century, 1923, Oxford: The Clarendon Press.
- Sayce and Cowley, Aramaic Papyri Discovered at Assuan, (London, 1906)
- Sprengling, M. "The Aramaic Papyri of Elephantine in English." The American Journal of Theology, vol. 21, no. 3, 1917, pp. 411–452. JSTOR, www.jstor.org/stable/3155527. Accessed 23 May 2021.
- Arnold, William R. "The Passover Papyrus from Elephantine." Journal of Biblical Literature 31, no. 1 (1912): 1–33. https://doi.org/10.2307/3259988.

=== Further reading ===
- Fitzmyer, Joseph A. "Some Notes on Aramaic Epistolography." Journal of Biblical Literature, vol. 93, no. 2, 1974, pp. 201–225. JSTOR, www.jstor.org/stable/3263093. Accessed 23 May 2021.
- Toorn, Karel van der (24 September 2019). Becoming Diaspora Jews: Behind the Story of Elephantine. Yale University Press. ISBN 978-0-300-24949-1.
- Bresciani, Edda (1998). "ELEPHANTINE". Encyclopaedia Iranica, Vol. VIII, Fasc. 4. pp. 360–362.
- Kraeling, Emil G.H. (1953). The Brooklyn Museum Aramaic Papyri: New Documents of the Fifth Century B.C. from the Jewish Colony at Elephantine. Yale University Press. ISBN 978-0-405-00873-3.
- Porten, Bezalel (1996). The Elephantine Papyri in English: Three Millennia of Cross-Cultural Continuity and Change. Documenta et monumenta Orientis antiqui : studies in Near Eastern archaeology and civilisation. New York. ISBN 978-90-04-10197-5.
- Bezalel Porten, Archives from Elephantine: The Life of an Ancient Jewish Military Colony, 1968. (Berkeley: University of California Press)
- Yochanan Muffs (Prolegomenon by Baruch A. Levine), 2003. Studies in the Aramaic Legal Papyri from Elephantine (Brill Academic)
- A. van Hoonacker, Une Communauté Judéo-Araméenne à Éléphantine, en Égypte aux VIe et Ve siècles av. J.-C., 1915, London, The Schweich Lectures
- Joseph Mélèze-Modrzejewski, The Jews of Egypt, 1995, Jewish Publication Society
- Stanley A Cook, THE SIGNIFICANCE OF THE ELEPHANTINE PAPYRI FOR THE HISTORY OF HEBREW RELIGION
