= Padua Aramaic papyri =

Aramaic Egyptian papyri

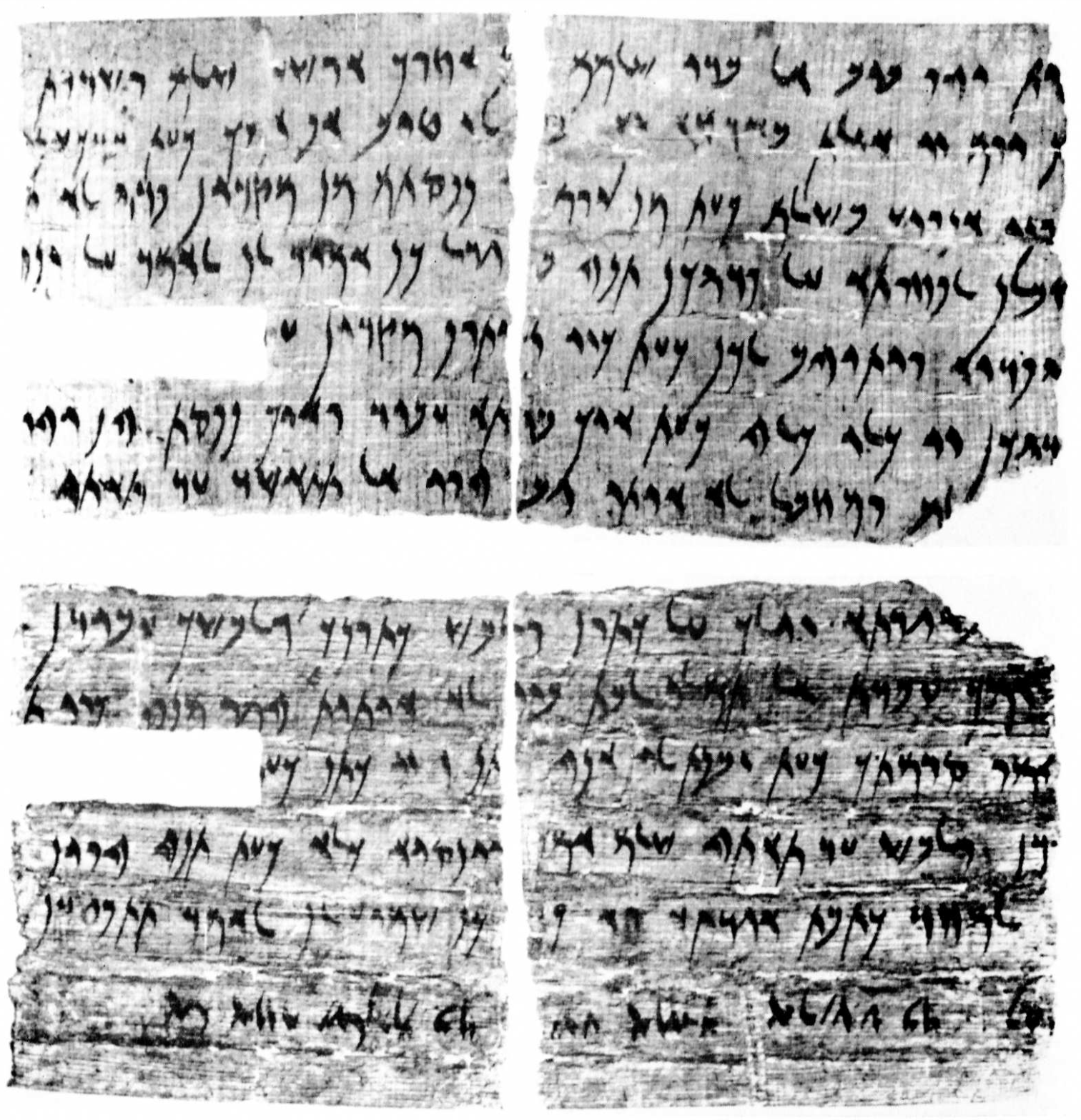
Padua Aramaic papyri 1

The Padua Aramaic papyri are a group of three Aramaic papyri thought to be from the 400s BCE, found in a collection of antiquities in the Italian city of Padua. The papyri are unprovenanced, but are thought to have been from Elephantine, which would make them the first Elephantine papyri and ostraca to have been discovered (although published much later than most). They were acquired by Giovanni Belzoni in c.1815, together with a demotic letter; Belzoni presented them to the Musei Civici di Padova in 1819.

They were first published in 1936 by Luigi Gaudenzio in a group of unrelated documents; they first received scholarly attention after their 1960 publication by Edda Bresciani. They are currently in the Musei Civici di Padova, and are also known as TSSI II 28 and TAD A3.3-3.4.

They are considered to form part of the corpus of Elephantine papyri and ostraca; Bresciani wrote as follows:

The letter referred to in this publication as Papyrus I shows that the recipient was in Elephantine, as he begins with greetings at the temple of Yaho in Elephantine. This, if it is not absolutely decisive for affirming that Elephantine is also the place of discovery, nevertheless makes it probable. The Papyrus III still suggests Elephantine, since it reads .... and ..... is the term commonly used in the Aramaic Elephantine papyri to indicate the temple of Yaho on the island. In Papyrus II is mentioned a ......, which therefore bears an Egyptian proper name, frequent and typical of Elephantine where Khnum was the local god. On this basis, I would propose, naturally without absolute certainty, Elephantine, as the possible common place of origin of the papyri.

== Bibliography ==
- Bresciani, Edda. "PAPIRI ARAMAICI EGIZIANI DI EPOCA PERSIANA PRESSO IL MUSEO CIVICO DI PADOVA." Rivista Degli Studi Orientali 35 (1960): 11-24. Accessed August 25, 2021. http://www.jstor.org/stable/41922886.
- Fitzmyer, Joseph A. "The Padua Aramaic Papyrus Letters." Journal of Near Eastern Studies 21, no. 1 (1962): 15-24. Accessed August 25, 2021. http://www.jstor.org/stable/543549.
- Porten, Bezalel (1996). The Elephantine Papyri in English: Three Millennia of Cross-Cultural Continuity and Change. Documenta et monumenta Orientis antiqui : studies in Near Eastern archaeology and civilisation. New York. ISBN 978-90-04-10197-5.
