= Bethel (god) =

Deity in the Hebrew Bible

Bethel, meaning 'House of El' or 'House of God' in Hebrew, Phoenician and Aramaic, was the name of a god or an aspect of a god in some ancient Middle Eastern texts dating to the Assyrian, Achaemenid, and Hellenistic periods. The term appears in the Torah and the Christian Bible, but opinions differ as to whether those references are to a god or to a place.

== Historical records ==
The ancient Phoenician Sanchuniathon mentions the god Baitylos as a brother of the gods El and Dagon. He later says that the god Sky devised the baetylia, having contrived to put life into stones. There does not seem to be any clear relationship between these two terms, however.

A 1977 book by the academic Javier Teixidor cited some early references that support viewing Bethel as a god of Aramaean or more generally Syrian origin. The author maintains that the origin of the god's cult is unknown, but provides what he believes to be some of the earliest references to the god:

- Theophoric names in the seventh century BC,
- the 677 BC Esarhaddon's Treaty with Ba'al of Tyre, which associates Bethel with what is apparently another god, Anat-Bethel, in a curse upon the Tyrians if they break the treaty: "May Bethel and Anat-Bethel deliver you to a man-eating lion"; and
- an Aramaic tablet from Aleppo dating to 570 BC, which contains three theophoric names of the god Bethel.

Teixodir states that Bethel became popular during the Neo-Babylonian Empire, which began in the seventh century BCE. He found numerous references to the cult of Bethel in fifth-century BCE Egyptian literature, and notes that Bethel is mentioned, but with no details, in the Elephantine papyri and ostraca and the Hermopolis Aramaic papyri. Those papyri also mention gods with names that are variants of Bethel: Eshembethel, 'Name of Bethel' and Ḥerembethel, 'Sanctuary of Bethel' (cf. Arabic ḥaram 'sanctuary'). Tawny Holm also notes that Papyrus Amherst 63 syncretizes Bethel with Yaho.

== Biblical references ==
The term Bethel or Beth-El appears in the Hebrew Bible and the Old Testament, but opinions differ as to whether these references are to a god or to a place.

Porten suspects that the Bethel mentioned in the Book of Jeremiah in Jeremiah 48:13, "Moab shall be ashamed of Chemosh, as the house of Israel was ashamed of Bethel, their confidence", is a reference to the god Bethel, rather than the city named Bethel. On the other hand, Biblical scholar Rodney Hutton says that the Bethel referred to in this verse is a location or city, and a metaphor for religious apostasy because it was the place where Jeroboam installed the golden calf.

There is further support among biblical scholars for the view of Bethel as a location rather than a god:

- Hutton regards Bethel as a place, not a god, in his commentary on The Book of Samuel 7:16: "Jacob gave the site, where God had spoken to him, the name of Bethel."
- Biblical scholar David M. Carr's commentary on the Book of Genesis generally regards Bethel as a place, in the contexts where it appears in Genesis 31:13 and Genesis 35:9-35:15. With respect to the phrase "I am the God of Bethel" in the first of these verses, Carr states that the Hebrew is unclear, raising further doubt.
- The Rabbinical Assembly of The United Synagogue of Conservative Judaism, in its commentary on "The Revelation at Bethel" (Genesis 35:9-15) in parashah Vayishlach, follows the medieval Rabbinic commentaries and also treats Bethel as a place.

Another interpretation is that the stone which Jacob placed at Bethel, which was named House-of-God, was also a god in itself, a manifestation of the god Bethel.

== Names ==
The divine name is found in composite forms Ashim-Bethel and Herem-Bethel in the archives of Elephantine, while Anat-Bethel appears as an epithet of Anat, the consort of Bethel.

Zechariah 7:2 gives the personal name Bethelsarezer (Hebrew: בֵּֽית־אֵ֔ל שַׂר־אֶ֕צֶר, romanized: Bēt̲-ʾēl śar-ʾeṣer, lit. 'Bethel, šarra-uṣur'; šarra-uṣur means "protect the king!" in Akkadian).
