= Sami Gabra =

Egyptian egyptologyst and coptologist

- Born: April 24, 1882; Abnub, Egypt
- Died: May 19, 1979 (aged 97); Heliopolis, Cairo, Egypt
- Scientific career
- Fields: Archaeology; Egyptology

Sami Gabra (April 24, 1882 – May 19, 1979) was an Egyptian Egyptologist and Coptologist.

Gabra was curator of the Egyptian Museum in Cairo from 1925 to 1928. He was a professor at Cairo University and the founder of the Society of Coptic Archaeology. He participated in excavations at Deir Tasa, Tura, Tuna el-Gebel, Dahshur and Meir.

== Early life ==
Gabra was born in 1882 in the town of Abnub. His father was a Coptic landowner. Gabra attended Asyut College, a private United Presbyterian Church of North America missionary school and Syrian Protestant College. He initially desired to work in the legal profession and moved to France to attend the University of Bordeaux, where he earned his doctorate in law.

In 1923, he enrolled at the University of Liverpool to study Egyptology under T. Eric Peet and John Garstang. His thesis was on "Justice under the Old and New Kingdom Egypt". In 1925, he enrolled at the École pratique des hautes études in Paris where he was taught by Alexandre Moret, Gustave Lefebvre and Raymond Weill.

== Career ==
Upon his return to Egypt, he worked for Pierre Lacau at the Department of Antiquities for five years. He became a professor of ancient Egyptian history at Cairo University after leaving the department. In 1939, he replaced Hermann Junker as the Egyptology department chair at the university.

Under the auspices of Cairo University, he excavated at Tuna el-Gebel from 1931 to 1952. Among his notable finds were the Hermopolis Aramaic papyri.

After he retired from the university following the 1952 Egyptian revolution, Gabra became director of the Higher Institute of Coptic Studies (Ma'had al-dirasat al-qibtiyya).

== Publications ==
- The Councils of Officials in Pharaonic Egypt: Scenes of Royal Awards to Officials, Cairo, 1929.
- Fresco paintings and painted scenes at East Hermopolis <Touna El-Gebel>, Cairo, Printing of the French Institute of Oriental Archaeology, 1954.
- Among the last worshipers of Trismegistus: The necropolis of Hermopolis, Touna el Gebel, Cairo, 1971.
- With Dia'Abou-Ghazi, Ramadan el-Sayed, From Tasa to Touna, Cairo, Dar al-Maaref, 1984.
