= Papyrus Amherst 63 =

Aramaic text in demotic script

- Fragment 4 of Papyrus Amherst 63 in the Pierpont Morgan Library
- Discovered: 1896; Luxor, Luxor Governorate, Egypt
- Present location: New York and Michigan, United States

Papyrus Amherst 63 (CoS 1.99) is an ancient Egyptian papyrus from the third century BC containing Aramaic texts in demotic Egyptian script. The 35 texts date to the eighth and seventh centuries BC. One of these, a version of Psalm 20, provides an "unprecedented" extrabiblical parallel to a text from the Hebrew Bible. It syncretizes abundantly, including the names Anat, Yaho and Bethel, and mentions a khnh, a word meaning priestess of Yaho.

== Origin ==
Amherst 63 was originally a single papyrus scroll with a length of 12 feet (3.7 m), written on both sides. It was created by and for the mixed Aramean and Israelite diaspora communities in the Egyptian cities of Elephantine and Aswan. The homeland for a segment of this community is called rš or ʾrš in the text, with several theories being put forth for its identity. Some have argued it is to be found at an-Naqoura on the southern coast of Lebanon. Others have claimed it is identical with the Rashu of Neo-Assyrian language texts, a land between Babylonia and Elam. If this is correct, then the community behind the papyrus may originally have been subject to the Assyrian captivity. Of these groups, the Books of Kings records that they "would venerate Yahweh but serve their own gods according to the practices of the nations from which they had been exiled," which is consistent with the polytheism expressed in Amherst 63.

Amherst 63 was probably dictated in the early third century BC by an Aramaic-speaking priest to an Egyptian scribe with fourth-century training. Some of the text, however, is considerably older and must predate the Assyrian captivity in 722 BC. The compilation, however, probably post-dates 701 BC, when Sennacherib's campaign in the Levant forced many Samarians to take refuge in Aram, leading to the displacement of Hebrew by Aramaic. The last tale on the papyrus refers to the death of Šamaš-šuma-ukin in 648 BC and must have been added after that date if the entire corpus was not put together later. Van der Toorn argues circumstantially it may have been compiled for the inauguration of a renovated temple of Nabu in the city of Palmyra in the seventh century. Holm counters there's no use of the name of the city in the text, no evidence at all from Palmyra in the period, and, citing "mistakes" and "awkwardness" in the identification, disputes van der Toorn's location-based divisions.

== Contents ==
Amherst 63 contains 434 lines in 23 columns without any clear division marks. Richard C. Steiner thought it represented an extended liturgy for a New Year's festival. Karel van der Toorn agrees that much of it concerns a New Year's festival, but adds that it was a combination of the "rites of the year" and ḥodeš, "the new moon (festival)." Van der Toorn sees a compilation of about 35 distinct texts grouped into five sections.

1. The Babylonians
  1. "Magnificat for the Lady of the Sanctuary"
  2. "May the Lady Rear Her Child"
  3. "He Smells as Pleasant as You"
  4. "I Am the Cow"
  5. "Nabu Chooses His Bride"
  6. "The Judge at the Gate"
  7. "A Blessing"
  8. "Kings Saw You and Were Fearful"
  9. "My Gift Is for You on New Year's Day"
2. The Syrians
  1. "They Put Their Hands in Shackles"
  2. "What the God of Rash Said"
  3. "My Servant, Do Not Fear"
  4. "A Dwelling for Bethel"
  5. "Bethel's Beauty Contest"
  6. "Praying for Rain"
  7. "Hope for the Fugitives"
  8. "Father of the Orphan, Champion of the Widow"
  9. "The Lord of Thunderstorms"
  10. "Dreaming of the City in Rash"
  11. "Prayer against Enemies"
3. The Samarians
  1. "A Desolate City under Tall Cedars"
  2. "May Yaho Answer Us in Our Troubles"
  3. "Our Banquet Is for You"
  4. "The Host of Heaven Proclaims Your Rule"
4. In Palmyra
  1. "Lady, Restore Your Sanctuary!"
  2. "A Reign of Everlasting Peace"
  3. "Haddu, Bless Gaddi-El!"
  4. "Evening in the City of Palms"
  5. "Song to the Rising Sun"
  6. "The God Who Answers with Fire"
  7. "Shelter for the Samarians"
  8. "Nanay and Her Lover"
  9. "A Blessing before Bethel"
5. Appendix
  1. "A Complaint among the Cedars"
  2. "A Tale of Two Brothers"

Three of the texts may be described as psalms. These are "May Yaho Answer Us in Our Troubles" (at col. xii, lines 11–19), "Our Banquet Is for You" (xiii, 1–10) and "The Host of Heaven Proclaims Your Rule" (xiii, 11–17). The first of these is a polytheistic version of Psalm 20 from the Hebrew Bible. Martin Rösel has noted parallels between the second and the biblical Psalm 75.

=== Mar and Marah ===
The papyrus often uses the word Mar or feminine Marah. In some Semitic languages, including Aramaic, these words mean lord and lady. Van der Toorn thought some Mar references might have been added later by an imagined Aramean editor, since they seemed "burdensome" of the poem.

=== Excerpt ===
line 13	sʾhr_{2}ʾ · šʾlʾḥʾ · ṣ_{3}yʾr_{2}ʾk · mn^{n} kʾl · ʾ_{2}ʾr_{2}ʾšʾH wʾmn + ṣ_{3}pʾnʾ ·	Crescent, be a bow in heaven!

Subscript numbers indicate same consonant and different sign. Context from different translation:

A Psalm from Bethel (XI.11–19)
May Horus answer us in our troubles;
may Adonai answer us in our troubles.
O crescent (lit., bow) / bowman in heaven, Sahar / shine forth;
send your emissary from the temple of Arash,
and from Zephon may Horus help us.

== Discovery and decipherment ==
The double divine names Anat-Ya'u and Anat-Bethel are found in Papyrus Amherst and Arthur Cowley's Elephantine.

Amherst 63 was part of a group of twenty papyri discovered in an earthen jar at Thebes late in the 19th century. These were the "new papyri" acquired by William Tyssen-Amherst in 1896, after work on cataloguing his collection had already begun. In the published catalogue of 1899, the "new papyri" are allotted a range of numbers. The whole collection of Amherst papyri was later acquired by the Pierpont Morgan Library in New York City, but Amherst 63 did not arrive there until 1947. A few fragments of the same papryus also wound up in the University of Michigan Library (now Michigan-Amherst 43b). It was finally assigned a specific number from the catalogue range by Theodore C. Petersen at that time. It had remained a mystery, because its demotic script did not encode Egyptian, (save some loan words) until Raymond Bowman identified it as Aramaic on the basis of photographs in 1944. As such, it is an example of allography. It was finally deciphered only in the 1980s. Parts were first published in 1983 and the first full edition appeared only in 1997.

=== Deities ===
There are abundant syncretisms, equivalencies of deities, at least five consort pairs, and some disagreement on how to read the Demotic. For example, Tawny L Holm's updates to scholarship remove Steiner's Osiris (which is typically spelled ˀwsry) and instead find Asherah in the spelling ˀsˀr_{2}ˀ.

== Another instance of Aramaic in demotic ==
In 2001, R. C. Steiner called a scorpion spell from Wadi Hammamat "another Aramaic text in demotic script". The scholar who discovered it had earlier dismissed it as "Zauberworte", magical nonsense—as is sometimes interpreted in other artifacts like curse bowls.

== Works cited ==
- Bowman, Raymond A. (1944). "An Aramaic Religious Text in Demotic Script". Journal of Near Eastern Studies. 3 (4): 219–231. doi:10.1086/370721. S2CID 161404321.
- Heckl, Raik (2014). "Inside the Canon and Out: The Relationship Between Psalm 20 and Papyrus Amherst 63". Semitica. 56: 359–379.
- Holm, Tawny (2021). "In Praise of Gods & Goddesses in Aramean Egypt: Papyrus Amherst 63". In Bricault, Laurent; Stadler, Martin Andreas (eds.). Hymnen und Aretalogien im antiken Mittelmeerraum: von Inana bis Isis. Harrassowitz Verlag. p. 308. ISBN 978-3-447-11686-2.
- Holm, Tawny (2022). "Papyrus Amherst 63 and the Arameans of Egypt: A Landscape of Cultural Nostalgia". In Kratz, Reinhard Gregor; Schipper, Bernd U. (eds.). Elephantine in Context: Studies on the History, Religion and Literature of the Judeans in Persian Period Egypt. Mohr Siebeck. pp. 323–351. ISBN 978-3-16-160996-1.
- Holm, Tawny (2023). "Bethel and Yahō: A Tale of Two Gods in Egypt". Journal of Ancient Near Eastern Religions. 23 (1). Brill: 25–55. doi:10.1163/15692124-12341335. ISSN 1569-2116.
- Kister, Menahem (2019). "Psalm 20 and Papyrus Amherst 63: A Window to the Dynamic Nature of Poetic Texts". Vetus Testamentum. 70 (3): 426–457. doi:10.1163/15685330-12341400.
- Naʾaman, Nadav (2022). "Papyrus Amherst 63: Shifting between the Heavenly and Earthly Spheres". Tel Aviv: Journal of the Institute of Archaeology of Tel Aviv University. 49 (2): 250–266. doi:10.1080/03344355.2022.2102112. S2CID 252384044.
- Newberry, Percy E. (1899). The Amherst Papyri: Being an Account of the Egyptian Papyri in the Collection of the Right Hon. Lord Amherst of Hackney, F.S.A. at Didlington Hall, Norfolk. Bernard Quaritch.
- Nims, Charles F.; Steiner, Richard C. (1983). "A Paganized Version of Psalm 20:2–6 from the Aramaic Text in Demotic Script" (PDF). Journal of the American Oriental Society. 103 (1): 261–274. doi:10.2307/601883. JSTOR 601883.
- Quack, Joachim Friedrich (2010). "Egyptian Writing for Non-Egyptian Languages and Vice Versa: A Short Overview". In Alex de Voogt; Irving L. Finkel (eds.). The Idea of Writing: Play and Complexity. Brill. pp. 315–325.
- Rösel, Martin (2000). "Israels Psalmen in Ägypten? Papyrus Amherst 63 und die Psalmen XX und LXXV". Vetus Testamentum. 50 (1): 81–99. doi:10.1163/156853300506233.
- Schipper, Bernd U. (2022). "The Judaeans/Arameans of Elephantine and Their Religion". In Kratz, Reinhard Gregor; Schipper, Bernd U. (eds.). Elephantine in Context: Studies on the History, Religion and Literature of the Judeans in Persian Period Egypt. Mohr Siebeck. pp. 323–351. ISBN 978-3-16-160996-1.
- Steiner, Richard C. (1995). "Papyrus Amherst 63: A New Source for the Language, Literature, Religion, and History of the Aramaeans" (PDF). In M. J. Geller; J. C. Greenfield; M. P. Weitzman (eds.). Studia Aramaica: New Sources and New Approaches. Oxford University Press. pp. 199–207.
- Steiner, Richard C. (1997). "The Aramaic Text in Demotic Script" (PDF). In Wililam W. Hallo (ed.). The Context of Scripture. Vol. 1: Canonical Compositions from the Biblical World. Brill. pp. 309–327.
- Steiner, Richard C. (2017). "Lord Amherst's Demotic Papyri and Lady Amherst's Mummy". Bernard Revel Graduate School of Jewish Studies Faculty Publications. Yeshiva University. hdl:20.500.12202/75.
- van der Toorn, Karel (2017). "Celebrating the New Year with the Israelites: Three Extrabiblical Psalms from Papyrus Amherst 63". Journal of Biblical Literature. 136 (3): 633–649. doi:10.15699/jbl.1363.2017.199794. S2CID 201780097.
- van der Toorn, Karel (2018a). Papyrus Amherst 63. Alter Orient und Altes Testament. Vol. 448. Ugarit-Verlag.
- van der Toorn, Karel (2018b). "Egyptian Papyrus Sheds New Light on Jewish History". Biblical Archaeology Review. 44 (4): 33–39, 66–68.
- van der Toorn, Karel (2019). Becoming Diaspora Jews: Behind the Story of Elephantine. Yale University Press.
