= Wadj (nomarch) =

- Nomarch of the 21st nome of Upper Egypt
- Tenure: c. 1800 BC
- Dynasty: 12th dynasty
- Burial: Khelua, Egypt
- Mother: Nebetmuti

Wadj was an Ancient Egyptian local governor who is known from a cut rock tomb at Khelua in the Faiyum. He lived in the 12th Dynasty around 1800 BC

Many titles of him are attested, the most important of which being Haty-a, which means that he was the governor of a town. He was also overseer of priests and overlord of the marshes. His mother was a woman called Nebetmuti.

His burial complex consists of an entrance hall with 12 pillars. At the back were six statues showing Wadj standing. They were not well preserved when found. Behind that there is a big hall with again 12 pillars. The pillars show each on all four sides a standing figure of Wadj with his titles above. The remains show Wadj sitting in front of an offering table as well as many servants bringing offerings. The walls of the hall were once decorated with reliefs but they are not well preserved. A statue of Wadj showing him in a sitting position was also found. The text provides further titles.

== Bibliography ==
- Bresciani, Edda (1997–1998): Khelua, l'indagine e le scoperte, in Egitto e Vicino Oriente, 1997–1998, 20/21, pp. 49, 51–76
