= Hermopolis Aramaic papyri =

Aramaic Egyptian papyri

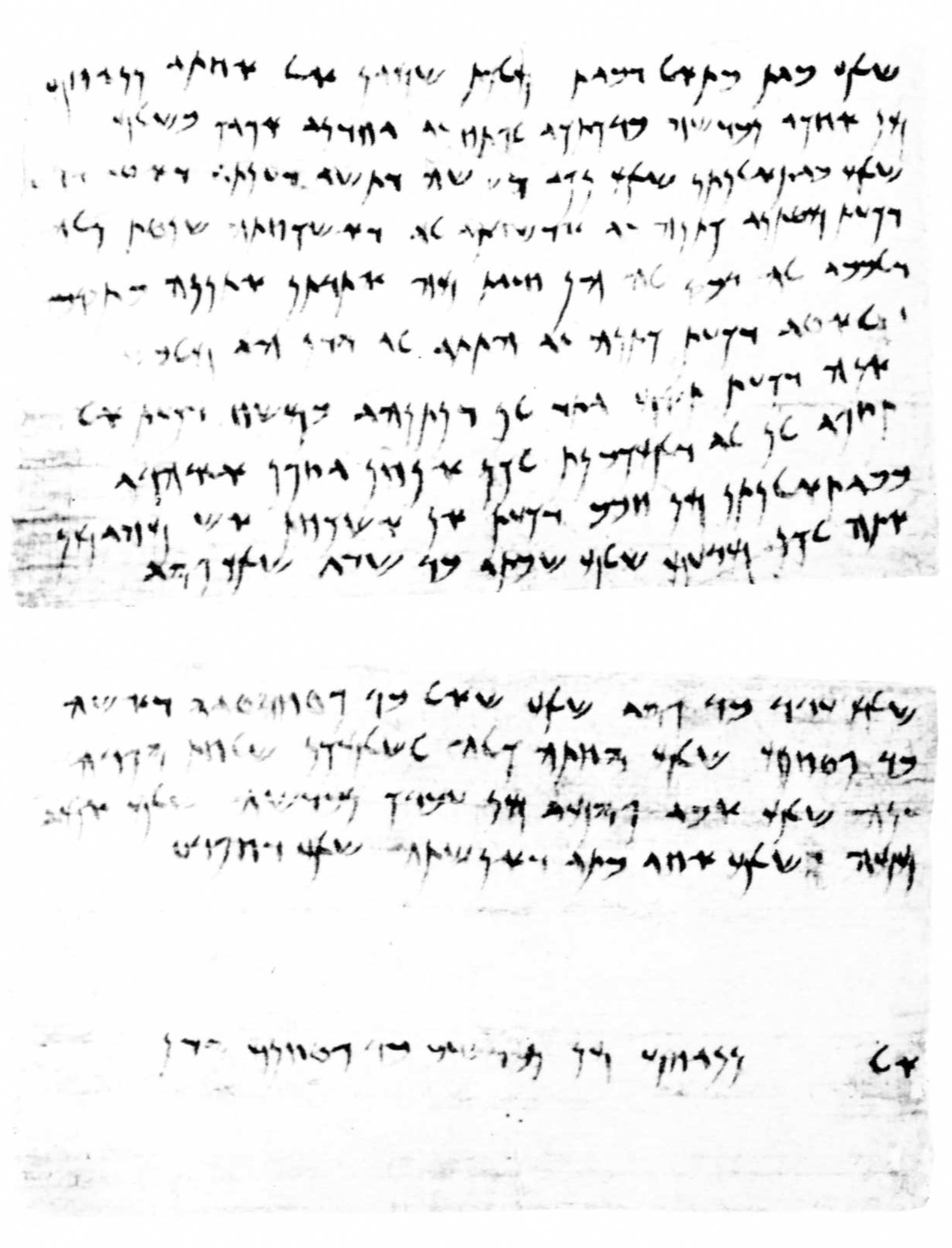
Hermopolis Aramaic papyrus 4

The Hermopolis Aramaic papyri are a group of eight Aramaic papyri thought to be from the late sixth or early fifth century BCE, found in 1945 at Hermopolis. They were first published in 1966 by Edda Bresciani and Cairo University's Murad Kamil.

They were discovered in February 1945 in the Ibis temple during Sami Gabra's excavations. The letters are thought to have been sent from Memphis to relatives or friends in Syene or Luxor. They have been widely compared to the Elephantine papyri.

They are currently in the Cairo University Archaeological Museum, and are known as TAD A2.1-2.7:

- Hermopolis 1 (Cairo Univ., Arch. Mus. P. 1687)
- Hermopolis 2 (Cairo Univ., Arch. Mus. P. 1688)
- Hermopolis 3 (Cairo Univ., Arch. Mus. P. 1689)
- Hermopolis 4 (Cairo Univ., Arch. Mus. P. 1690), also known as TSSI II 27
- Hermopolis 5 (Cairo Univ., Arch. Mus. P. 1691)
- Hermopolis 6 (Cairo Univ., Arch. Mus. P. 1692)
- Hermopolis 7 (Cairo Univ., Arch. Mus. P. 1693)
- Hermopolis 8 (Cairo Univ., Arch. Mus. P. 1694)

== Bibliography ==
- Edda Bresciani; Murād Kāmil, 1966, Le lettere aramaiche di Hermopoli, Memorie (Accademia nazionale dei Lincei. Classe di scienze morali, storiche e filologiche)., ser. 8; v. 12, fasc. 5.
- Moriya, Akio, Hermopolis letters p. 156-162
- Hammershaimb, E. “Some Remarks on the Aramaic Letters from Hermopolis.” Vetus Testamentum 18, no. 2 (1968): 265–67. https://doi.org/10.2307/1516922.
