= Edda Bresciani =

Italian Egyptologist (1930–2020)

- Edda in the 1960s
- Born: 23 September 1930; Lucca, Kingdom of Italy
- Died: 29 November 2020 (aged 90); Lucca, Italy
- Education: University of Pisa
- Occupation: Egyptology

Edda Bresciani (23 September 1930 – 29 November 2020) was an Italian Egyptologist.

== Life ==
Bresciani was born in Lucca, and graduated in 1955 from the University of Pisa. She excavated at several places in Egypt and is mainly known for her work at several sites in the Faiyum, most notably the temple of Medinet Maadi. She also found and excavated a Middle Kingdom cemetery at Khelua. She discovered there the large tomb of Wadj.

In 1974 the University of Pisa appointed Bresciani at the lead of an excavation campaign at Saqqara; here she studied the 26th Dynasty tomb of the vizier Bakenrenef. In 1978 she founded the still–running Egitto e Vicino Oriente, the Egyptological journal of the University. She also performed excavations at the "Temple of Million Years" of Thutmose IV at Thebes.

A proficient demotist, Bresciani published many books on her work. She earned a medal for meritorious science and culture in May 1996, and was a fellow of the Accademia dei Lincei. After her retirement, Bresciani became professor emerita at the University of Pisa.

== Publications ==
- Edda Bresciani, Sergio Pernigotti, ASSUAN. Il tempio Tolemaico di Isi. I blocchi decorati e iscritti, Pisa: Giardini, 1978
- L'Antico Egitto di Ippolito Rosellini nelle tavole dai monumenti dell'Egitto e della Nubia, Ed. Istituto geografico de Agostini, ISBN 8841504102
- Grande Enciclopedia illustrata dell'Antico Egitto (ed. E. Bresciani), Ed. De Agostini 1998, 2005, ISBN 884155259X
- Il Volto Di Osiri: Tele Funerarie Dipinte nell'Egitto Romano, Ed. Maria Pacini Fazzi, ISBN 8872462320
- Khelua: Una Necropoli Del Medio Regno Nel Fayum, ETS, ISBN 8846702085
- Nozioni elementari di grammatica demotica, Ed. Cisalpino-Goliardica, ISBN 8820501503
- Sulle Rive Del Nilo: L'Egitto Al Tempo Dei Faraoni, GLF editori Laterza, ISBN 8842061662
- Food and drink. Life resources in ancient Egypt, Pacini: Fazzi, 1997
- Letteratura e poesia dell'antico Egitto. Cultura e società attraverso i testi, Einaudi Tascabili, 2007, ISBN 9788806190781
- I testi religiosi dell'antico Egitto, Mondadori, collana I Meridiani, 2001
- La piramide e la Torre. Duecento anni di archeologia egiziana (ed. E. Bresciani), Pisa, 2000
- Nine Pharaohs, Plus Pisa 2002 (Nove Faraoni, Plus: Pisa, 2001)
- Kom Madi 1977 e 1978. Le pitture murali del cenotafio di Alessandro Magno, Prima ristampa con aggiornamenti. With English text, Pisa, 2003
- Egypt in India. Egyptian Collection in Indian Museums (eds. E. Bresciani, M. Betrò), Pisa: Plus, 2004, ISBN 9788884921895
- Edda Bresciani, Mario Del Tacca, Arte medica e cosmetica alla corte dei Faraoni/Medicine and cosmetics at Pharaohs' court, Pisa, 2005, Pacini, ISBN 88-7781-668-6
- La porta dei sogni. Interpreti e sognatori nell'Egitto antico, Einaudi Saggi, 2005, ISBN 9788806177935
- Medinet Madi. Venti anni di esplorazione archeologica (1984-2005) (eds. Edda Bresciani, Antonio Giammarusti, Rosario Pintaudi, Flora Silvano) Pisa, 2006
- Ramesse II, Firenze: Giunti Editore, 2012, ISBN 9788809763227
