= 1919 New Year Honours (MBE) =

Appointments by King George V to various orders and honours

This is a list of MBEs awarded in the 1919 New Years Honours.

The 1919 New Year Honours were appointments by King George V to various orders and honours to reward and highlight good works by citizens of the British Empire. The appointments were published in The London Gazette and The Times in January 1919.

The recipients of honours are displayed here as they were styled before their new honour, and arranged by honour, with classes (Knight, Knight Grand Cross, etc.) and then divisions (Military, Civil, etc.) as appropriate.

== Members of the Order of the British Empire (MBE) ==
=== Military Division ===
Royal Navy

- 1st Engineer Frank Ablett
- Chief Boatswain George Hamilton Alexander
- Gunner Charles Palmer Bennett
- Paymaster Sub-Lieutenant Alfred Stephen Black, Royal Naval Reserve
- Warrant Ward Master Henry Budge
- Acting Paymaster Lieutenant Henry John Cary, Royal Naval Reserve
- Paymaster Sub-Lieutenant James Michael Diver, Royal Naval Reserve
- Lieutenant Duncan McAuley Gracie, Royal Naval Volunteer Reserve
- Quartermaster and Honorary Captain George Harrington, Royal Marines
- Chief Skipper Ernest William Hovells, Royal Naval Reserve
- Lieutenant William Edward Long, Royal Naval Volunteer Reserve
- Lieutenant Allan Macbeth, Royal Naval Volunteer Reserve
- Warrant Shipwright Ernest Charles Miller
- Paymaster Lieutenant James Walwyn Gynlais Morgan, Royal Naval Reserve
- Skipper John Ernest Shepherd, Royal Naval Reserve
- Warrant Victualling Officer Alfred Charles Waugh
- Paymaster Sub-Lieutenant Hugh Brown Wilson, Royal Naval Volunteer Reserve
- Skipper Walter Wooldridge, Royal Naval Reserve

Army

- Quartermaster and Captain Robert Frank Adams, Royal Army Service Corps
- Quartermistress Doreen Allen, Queen Mary's Army Auxiliary Corps
- Captain Rowland Alison Alston, 3rd Battalion, Northamptonshire Regiment
- Lieutenant William Daniel Chamberlain Balls, 7th Battalion, Northumberland Fusiliers
- Quartermaster and Lieutenant John Henry Adolphus Banger, Extra Regimentally Employed List
- Captain Benjamin Croft Bayley, London Electrical Engineers
- Captain Arthur Tetley Beazley, Gun Ammunition Filling Department, Ministry of Munitions
- Temp Quartermaster and Captain John Evitt Bishop, Royal Field Artillery
- Lieutenant Frederick Laurence Broad, Depot Officer, Central Stores Department, Ministry of Munitions
- Quartermaster and Lieutenant Walter Peaston Britton, Extra Regimentally Employed List
- Temp Lieutenant Henry Arthur Brooks, Special List
- Temp Lieutenant John Rowe Brooks, Special List
- Captain Arthur Walter Brown, 6th Battalion, West Yorkshire Regiment
- Temp Quartermaster and Captain Charles Budd, Royal Army Veterinary Corps
- Temp Lieutenant James William Budge, Special List
- Captain Elias Wynne Cemlyn-Jones, 6th Battalion, Royal Welsh Fusiliers
- Unit Administrator Marie Langslow Chapman, Queen Mary's Army Auxiliary Corps
- Unit Administrator Beatrice L. Clay, Queen Mary's Army Auxiliary Corps
- 2nd Lieutenant Thomas Cooper, General List
- Lieutenant Noel Harwood Cope, 5th Battalion, West Yorkshire Regiment
- Captain Alexander Henry Cowan, General List Reserve
- Recruiting Controller Muriel Craigie, Queen Mary's Army Auxiliary Corps
- Lieutenant Edward Curry, Royal Field Artillery
- Temp Captain Samuel Cursley, General List
- Lieutenant Arthur Edward Desmond, Royal Engineers
- Lieutenant William Edwards, Royal Dragoons
- Captain Arthur Evelyn Paul Ellis, 3rd Battalion, Rifle Brigade
- Lieutenant Thomas William Emerson, General List Reserve
- Captain Robert Forrest, 5th Battalion, Bedfordshire Regiment
- Lieutenant Percy Tom Freeman, Royal Engineers
- Lieutenant Cecil Murdoch Gamage, Royal Engineers
- Captain Alan Parry Gamier MC Northumberland Fusiliers
- Temp Captain Randolph G. Gethin, General List, late South Irish Horse
- Quartermaster and Captain Robert Thomas Gough, Royal Engineers
- Captain Donald Ernest Grant, Section Director, Gun Manufacture Department, Ministry of Munitions
- Major Percy Christopher Gallimore Hayward, Assistant Director of National Service, Norwich
- Captain Sidney John Heath, Welsh Regiment
- Honorary Temp Lieutenant Graham Hetherington, Royal Army Veterinary Corps
- Captain Francis Holland, 10th Battalion, Liverpool Regiment
- Temp Lieutenant Charles Geoffrey Holme, Royal Army Service Corps
- Temp 2nd Lieutenant Hubert Jack Holmes MC Special List
- Captain Vernon Grove Horton, General List Reserve
- Captain W. F. Hutchings, 29th Battalion, London Regiment
- Captain Horace Swales Johnson, West Yorkshire Regiment
- Quartermaster and Captain Harry Beresford Jones, Royal Defence Corps
- Captain Edward William Kirkby, Special List
- Temp Lieutenant Adrian Bernard L. Klein, Norfolk Regiment
- Lieutenant E. C. Knapp, 3rd Battalion, Somerset Light Infantry
- 2nd Lieutenant Joseph Whittington Landon, Unattached List
- Captain Francis Henry Lawrence, Royal Garrison Artillery
- Lieutenant John Boyd Lawson, Royal Engineers
- Unit Administrator Mary Lenegham, Queen Mary's Army Auxiliary Corps
- Temp Lieutenant George Lister, General List
- Unit Administrator Ethel Vernon Lloyd, Queen Mary's Army Auxiliary Corps
- Lieutenant James Keith Macleod, Royal Field Artillery
- Temp Captain John Newton Martin, Royal Army Medical Corps
- Captain H. A. Meredith, Territorial Force Reserve
- Quartermaster and Captain James Mitchell, Argyll and Sutherland Highlanders
- Lieutenant Rhys Hopkin Morris, 2nd Battalion, Royal Welsh Fusiliers
- Temp Captain Hugh A. Moutray-Read, Royal Army Service Corps
- Captain James Calder Muirhead, T.F. Reserve
- Temp Lieutenant Alexander Gordon Wynch Murray, Cambridge University Officers Training Corps
- Temp Lieutenant Francis Clement Prideaux Naish, Royal Engineers
- Quartermaster and Captain Thomas George Hull Nightingale, Royal Artillery
- Temp Lieutenant Edward Joseph O'Kelly, General List
- Quartermaster and Lieutenant Richard Oliver DCM 4th Battalion, East Yorkshire Regiment
- Temp Quartermaster and Captain Richard Owen, Royal Army Veterinary Corps
- Quartermaster and Lieutenant John McDonald Patrick, 3rd Battalion, Cameron Highlanders
- Captain Abraham William Pegrum, Royal Army Ordnance Corps
- Captain William Gilbert Popplestone, Special List
- Captain Donnell Shepard Post, General List Reserve
- Captain George Henry Rayner, Royal Army Ordnance Corps
- 2nd Lieutenant Walter John Rayner, 4th Battalion, Royal Fusiliers
- Temp Quartermaster and Captain Robert John Reeder, Royal Engineers
- Lieutenant William Edgcumbe Rendle, Director of Experiments, Mechanical Warfare (Overseas and Allies) Department, Ministry of Munitions
- Lieutenant George Rennie, Special List Reserve
- Captain Dudley Gerald Rix, Special List
- 2nd Lieutenant Joseph Saul, Royal Garrison Artillery
- Captain James Scrimgeour, Special List
- Captain John Gilson Shield, Special List
- Quartermaster and Lieutenant William Solly, Royal Engineers
- Lieutenant Albert Edward Springate, Royal Artillery
- Lieutenant Herbert Alfred Stallan, Royal Artillery
- Captain Hugh William Stirling, General List Reserve
- Major John Stirling, Reserve
- Lieutenant John William Storey, Reserve, General List
- Recruiting Controller Gertrude M. H. Streeter, Queen Mary's Army Auxiliary Corps
- Temp Lieutenant Herbert Alfred Stringer, Royal Army Ordnance Corps
- Lieutenant Arthur Herbert Taylor, Army Gymnastic Staff
- Captain David Inman Tod, Section Director, Accounts Department, Ministry of Munitions
- Major Wyndham Frederick Tufnell, Voluntary Official, Canterbury, Ministry of National Service
- Captain Lionel Arthur Frederick Verge, Assistant Inspector, Gun Ammunition (Supervisory), Woolwich Arsenal
- Captain Edward Joseph Waldron, Inspector of Army Schools
- Temp Quartermaster and Captain Laurence Whattaker, Royal Army Medical Corps
- Temp Captain William Wigham-Richardson, General List
- Quartermaster and Captain John Wingfield Willsher, Royal Army Medical Corps
- Temp Captain Thomas Woombell, Rifle Brigade

Overseas Military Forces of Canada

- Lieutenant Joseph Harold-Watkins, General List
- Lieutenant Sidney George Webb, Quebec Regiment

Australian Imperial Force

- Honorary Major Arthur Cressy Barry, Australian Comforts Fund
- Captain George King, 15th Battalion, Australian Imperial Force
- Captain Eric Alfred Lee, 20th Battalion, Australian Imperial Force
- Lieutenant Rupert Livingstone Mayman, 10th Battalion, Australian Imperial Force
- Quartermaster and Honorary Captain Clarence Robert Murphy, General List
- Quartermaster and Honorary Captain William Andrew Perrin, General List
- Lieutenant William Price, 47th Battalion, Australian Imperial Force
- Captain William Henry Prior, General List
- Captain James Edmund Savage, Australian Army Service Corps

Administrative Headquarters of New Zealand

- Quartermaster and Captain Henry Eastgate, New Zealand Rifle Brigade
- Captain Gordon Harris Forsythe, New Zealand Field Artillery
- Captain Norman Joseph Levien, New Zealand Army Ordnance Corps
- Captain Donald Archibald McCurdy, New Zealand Army Postal Services
- Captain Henry Edward McGowan, Canterbury Regiment
- Captain Christopher Robert Alexander Magnay, New Zealand Rifle Brigade
- Quartermaster and Captain Richard Charles Staples-Brown, New Zealand Medical Corps

Union of South Africa

- Temp Captain Edmund Charles Kean Jamieson, South African Pay Corps
- Temp Captain Eric Bolingbroke Walker MC 1st Battalion, South African Infantry and General List
- Temp Captain James Cunningham Whyte, South African Native Labour Corps

For services rendered in connection with military operations in France and Flanders:

- Acting Sister Isabella Eugenie Marie Barbier RRC Civil Hospital Reserve
- Temp Lieutenant Henry Edward Beresford, Royal Engineers
- Temp Quartermaster and Lieutenant James Ballentyne Binnie, 9th Gordon Highlanders
- Temp Lieutenant Erie Bergo Brand, Royal Army Service Corps
- Temp 2nd Lieutenant James Waugh Butters, General List
- Unit Administrator Louisa Maud Chase, Queen Mary's Army Auxiliary Corps
- Unit Administrator Ethel Robin Clowes, Queen Mary's Army Auxiliary Corps
- Lieutenant Charles Dilworth, Officers Training Corps
- Temp Lieutenant William Frederick Dobson, Royal Engineers
- Temp Lieutenant Alan Gordon Dunell, Royal Army Service Corps
- Unit Administrator Mary Sanderson Faviell, Queen Mary's Army Auxiliary Corps
- Lieutenant Frederick Richard Gale, Royal Army Ordnance Corps
- Temp Lieutenant Geoffrey Goodyear, Machine Gun Corps
- Temp Lieutenant Herbert John Gough, Royal Engineers
- Lieutenant Lionel Havercroft Green, 3rd South Wales Borderers
- Temp Lieutenant Charles William Halliday, Royal Engineers
- Temp Quartermaster and Lieutenant Charles Sweet Hampton MC 2nd Welsh Regiment
- Temp Lieutenant Joseph Lawrence Harrison, Royal Army Ordnance Corps
- Temp Lieutenant Roland John Heath, Royal Army Service Corps
- Temp Quartermaster and Lieutenant Arthur Hill, General List
- Assistant Administrator Cicely Lamorna Kingston, Queen Mary's Army Auxiliary Corps
- Temp 2nd Lieutenant William Hogg, General List
- Temp 2nd Lieutenant Harold Hopkinson, Royal Army Service Corps
- Unit Administrator Elizabeth Houghton, Queen Mary's Army Auxiliary Corps
- Temp 2nd Lieutenant John Archibald Hughes, General List
- Unit Administrator Ethel Vivian Hyde, Queen Mary's Army Auxiliary Corps
- Unit Administrator Annie Emily Blanche Johnston, Queen Mary's Army Auxiliary Corps
- Lieutenant Francis Matthew Joyce MC Royal Field Artillery
- Quartermaster and Lieutenant William James Keery, 6th Nottinghamshire and Derbyshire Regiment
- Assistant Administrator Miriam Constance Lambert, Queen Mary's Army Auxiliary Corps
- Assistant Administrator Margaret Ruby Lutwyche, Queen Mary's Army Auxiliary Corps
- Temp Lieutenant Murdo Mackenzie, attd. Cameron Highlanders
- Temp Lieutenant Frank Charles Mallet, Royal Army Service Corps
- Unit Administrator Clara Neale, Queen Mary's Army Auxiliary Corps
- Temp Lieutenant William Albert Plowman, Labour Corps
- Temp Quartermaster and Lieutenant William Proud, Manchester Regiment (late Durham Light Infantry)
- Temp Lieutenant John Henry Rowlatt, Royal Army Service Corps
- Assistant Administrator Molly Saunders, Queen Mary's Army Auxiliary Corps
- Assistant Administrator Flora Murray Scott, Queen Mary's Army Auxiliary Corps
- Quartermaster and Lieutenant Cornelius Shepherd, 2nd Battalion, West Riding Regiment
- Temp Quartermaster and Captain George Robert Spring, Royal Army Medical Corps
- Temp Lieutenant Ernest Phillips Foquet Sutton, Royal Army Service Corps
- Unit Administrator Elizabeth Thomson, Queen Mary's Army Auxiliary Corps
- Temp Lieutenant Harry Cuthbert William Wilkinson, General List
- Temp Lieutenant Hugh Willett, Royal Engineers
- Temp 2nd Lieutenant Edgar Arthur Wilman, Royal Engineers
- Subadar Lachmi Narain, 72nd (U.P.) Indian Labour Company

Overseas Military Forces of Canada

For services rendered in connection with military operations in France and Flanders:

- Honorary Captain Thomas Herbert Hutchinson, Canadian Young Men's Christian Association
- Lieutenant Allan McLachlan, 87th Battalion, Quebec Regiment

Australian Imperial Force

- Honorary Captain Alexander McCallum, Australian Comforts Fund
- Lieutenant George Smith, Australian Engineers

For valuable services rendered in connection with Military Operations in Egypt:

- Temp Lieutenant George Aitchison, Royal Army Service Corps
- Temp Quartermaster and Lieutenant Walter James Baldwin, Royal Army Medical Corps
- Lieutenant James Barber, Royal Warwickshire Regiment
- 2nd Lieutenant James Cecil Lawson Barnes, Honourable Artillery Company
- Temp Lieutenant William Betts Blake, Royal Army Ordnance Corps
- Temp Lieutenant Frank Henry William Bullock, Royal Army Service Corps
- Temp Quartermaster and Lieutenant Frederick William Cudmore, Royal Army Medical Corps
- Lieutenant Cyril Francis Douglas-White, Argyll and Sutherland Highlanders, Special Reserve, attd. Royal Army Ordnance Corps
- Lieutenant Richard Endell Evans, Royal Engineers
- Temp 2nd Lieutenant Charles Lionel Eyres, Royal Engineers
- Temp Lieutenant Napier Paul Frampton, Royal Army Service Corps
- Lieutenant Reginald Lowood Gardner, Manchester Regiment
- Temp Lieutenant Gerald Gilbert Green, General List
- Captain Joseph Green Royal Army Medical Corps
- Temp Quartermaster and Lieutenant William Green, Royal Engineers
- Temp Quartermaster and Lieutenant Adolph Halin, Royal Engineers, Postal Section, Special Reserve
- Lieutenant Philip Francis Hamilton-Grierson, Royal Scots Fusiliers
- Temp 2nd Lieutenant William Ross Say, Royal Engineers
- Temp Lieutenant Fred Holden, Royal Army Service Corps
- Lieutenant Arthur Clement Hope, Scots Guards, Special Reserve
- Lieutenant Thomas William Irons, Royal Army Ordnance Corps
- Temp Lieutenant Arthur Henry Gould Kerry, Royal Engineers
- Temp Lieutenant Frederick Lewis, Royal Army Service Corps
- Lieutenant Thomas Clouston Rae MacGilvray, Argyll and Sutherland Highlanders, Special Reserve
- Temp Lieutenant Donald Paton Malyn, Royal Army Service Corps
- Captain Edgar James Merry, Welsh Regiment
- Lieutenant Thomas Percy Prosser Powell, Montgomeryshire Yeomanry
- Lieutenant Herbert Lee Sergeant, Royal Engineers
- Temp Quartermaster and Lieutenant Arthur William Shreeve, Royal Army Medical Corps
- Lieutenant Ernest William Slaughter, Royal Army Ordnance Corps
- Lieutenant James Harnpstead Smith, Royal Scots
- Lieutenant Ulric Doncaster Sowman, Royal Army Service Corps
- Temp Lieutenant Ernest Algernon Stoddard, General List, attd. Royal Engineers, Signal Service
- Lieutenant James Phillips Stratton, Royal Army Service Corps
- Temp 2nd Lieutenant Sholto Douglas Major Wilson, Hampshire Regiment

Australian Imperial Force

- Quartermaster and Honorary Captain Phillip Percival Buckland, 10th Australian Light Horse Regiment
- Honorary Lieutenant Wilfred John Thomas Frost, Australian Imperial Force Canteens

Egyptian Army

For valuable services rendered in connection with Military Operations in Egypt:

- El Saghkolagliasi Abdel Azim Effendi Abd El Kadi, 1st Battalion, Egyptian Army
- El Mulazim-Awal Anwar Effendi Amer, 1st Battalion, Egyptian Army
- El Yuzbashi Halim Effendi Sulman Shoucair, Medical Corps, Egyptian Army
- El YuzbashiMohammed Effendi Akle, Egyptian Army
- El Bimbashi Saleh Effendi Lufti, Egyptian Military Police

For services rendered in connection with Military Operations in Italy:

- Temp Captain Lewis Adolphus Bampfield, General List
- Temp Lieutenant Trevor Gaulter Benson, Royal Army Service Corps
- 2nd Lieutenant Lawrence Brown, Labour Corps
- Temp Quartermaster and Lieutenant William Carlisle, 10th (S.) Battalion, Northumberland Fusiliers
- Temp Lieutenant Oscar Bedford Daly, General List
- Lieutenant Francis Edmund Gibson, Royal Field Artillery
- Temp Lieutenant The Honourable Thomas Leopold McClintock-Bunbury, General List
- Temp Lieutenant Frederic William Moss MC Machine Gun Corps
- Lieutenant Thomas Whately Rose MC 5th Battalion, Royal Sussex Regiment
- Temp Inspector of Ordnance Machinery, John Smith, Royal Army Ordnance Corps
- Lieutenant Frank Percival Twine MC 5th Battalion, Royal Sussex Regiment
- Temp 2nd Lieutenant William Herbert Williams, 21st Battalion, Manchester Regiment
- Temp Lieutenant Richard Linsley Young, 9th Battalion, South Staffordshire Regiment

For valuable services rendered in connection with Military Operations in Salonika:

- Temp Lieutenant Geoffrey Charles Arrowsmith Bernays, Royal Engineers
- Lieutenant Thomas Hugh Conolly Blaikie, Royal Field Artillery
- Lieutenant Theodore Stephen Bliss MC Royal Engineers
- Temp Lieutenant Norton Breton, Special List
- Lieutenant Hugh Franklin Clarke, Royal Garrison Artillery
- Temp Lieutenant Henry Darlington Harold Court, Royal Engineers
- Lieutenant William Knight Duckett, Royal Engineers
- Temp Lieutenant Frederick Charles La Fontaine, General List
- Lieutenant The Honourable David William Leslie-Melville, 2nd Lovat's Scouts Yeomanry
- Lieutenant Reginald Anson Mansell Royal Army Medical Corps
- Temp Lieutenant William Mercer, Royal Army Service Corps
- Temp Lieutenant Harold John Cooke Neobard, Special List
- Temp Lieutenant Andreas Pallis, Special List
- Temp Lieutenant John Ramsbottom, Royal Army Medical Corps
- Temp Lieutenant Walter Deveson Reynolds, Royal Engineers
- Lieutenant Thomas Buston Robson, Royal Garrison Artillery
- Temp Lieutenant Gordon Stevens, Royal Engineers

Overseas Military Forces of Canada

- Lieutenant John Hamilton Lane Johnstone, Canadian Engineers

For valuable services rendered in connection with Military Operations in North Russia:

- Lieutenant A. E. Sturdy, Leicestershire Regiment
- 2nd Lieutenant A. Utterton, Royal Army Service Corps

Overseas Military Forces of Canada

- Major R. B. S. Burton, 8th Canadian Infantry Battalion, Manitoba Regiment

Royal Air Force

- Lieutenant George Philip Achurch
- 2nd Lieutenant John Leonard Adams DSM
- 2nd Lieutenant Arthur Dunscombe Allen
- Lieutenant Henry Graeme Anderson
- 2nd Lieutenant Charles Attrill
- 2nd Lieutenant Harry James Bagge
- Captain Edward Henry Bellew
- Captain Walter Owen Bentley
- Lieutenant Arthur William Brittain
- Captain William Robert Bruce-Clarke
- 2nd Lieutenant Fernand Charles-Butler
- Captain Leslie Wilden Carr
- Lieutenant John Eric Catherall
- Lieutenant John Harwood Catleugh
- Captain Archibald Sidney Cheshire
- Captain Fred Christie
- Lieutenant John George Neilson Clift
- Captain Herbert Prinsep Somers Clogstoun
- 2nd Lieutenant William Cole
- Lieutenant Edgar Edmund Colquhoun
- 2nd Lieutenant James Henry Cooke
- Captain Hugh George Corby
- Captain William Percy Cort
- Captain Reginald Aloysius Courtney
- Lieutenant Keppel Archibald Cameron Creswell
- Lieutenant Amos Allan Denison MC
- Captain William James Dew
- Captain Ernest O. Drudge
- Lieutenant Samuel Howard Ellis
- Captain Samuel Denys Felkin
- 2nd Lieutenant John Herbert Ferguson
- Lieutenant Walter Harrison Fielding
- 2nd Lieutenant Albert Edward Muspratt Fortescue
- Captain George Gerald Rae Fraser
- 2nd Lieutenant Robert McGonnan Freemantle
- 2nd Lieutenant John Hunt Furniss
- Captain Harold Gardiner-Hill
- Captain Arthur Basil Wickham Greenhough MC
- Captain Arthur Leslie Gregory MC
- Captain Adolph Herbert Handman
- Captain Albert Urbane Hansford
- Captain William Whiddon Hart
- 2nd Lieutenant Wilfred Edward Graham Heanly
- 2nd Lieutenant Noel Hemsley
- Captain Charles Goldby Hetherington
- Lieutenant Alfred Kingston
- 2nd Lieutenant James Walter Hostings
- Lieutenant Philip Charles Hoyland
- Lieutenant Eric Beresford Humphries MC
- Lieutenant Robert Henry Humphreys
- 2nd Lieutenant John Hunter
- Lieutenant Frederick Mitchell Iredale
- 2nd Lieutenant Maurice Jewison James
- 2nd Lieutenant Thomas Pargeter Jones
- Captain Alfred Knight
- Captain Edward Leonard Lauder
- Lieutenant Alistair Lee
- 2nd Lieutenant Bernard Alexander Levey
- 2nd Lieutenant Walter Lienard
- Lieutenant William Lingard
- Lieutenant George Henry Hudson Lyall
- Lieutenant William Hooker Lyall
- Lieutenant Edgar Lyne
- Captain Alister Pelham MacKilligan
- 2nd Lieutenant Robert Knox McLean
- 2nd Lieutenant John Alexander McMullen
- Captain John Mitchell Mitchell
- Lieutenant Edward Arthur Molyneux
- Captain Stanley Robert Mullard
- Lieutenant Herbert John Greatrex Newman
- Captain Tom Douglas Hamilton Osborn
- Lieutenant Alexander Rutherford Ovens
- Lieutenant Thomas Arthur Peddell
- Honorary Captain George Ramage
- Captain John Victor Read
- Captain Colin Spencer Richardson
- Lieutenant Jacob Sutcliffe Ruttie
- Captain Frederick William Scarff
- Captain Walter Alfred Scoble
- Lieutenant John Butterfield Sharpies
- 2nd Lieutenant James Henry Slater
- Captain Alexander Glegg Smith MC
- Lieutenant Charles Hodgkinson Smith
- Captain Henry Joseph Cecil Smith
- Captain Robert Stephenson-Peach
- Captain Robert Little Stevenson
- 2nd Lieutenant George John Stroud
- Lieutenant James Henry Richardson Sutherland, Canadian Infantry
- Lieutenant Henry Percy Tate
- Captain Tom Whitaker Tattersall
- 2nd Lieutenant Charles Stuart Thompson
- 2nd Lieutenant George Albert Thompson
- Captain Harry Tilley
- Lieutenant Samuel Arthur Turner
- Captain James Herbert Tyler
- Captain Dudley Francis Upjohn
- Lieutenant Émile Antoine Verpilleux
- Captain Robert Bruce Waite
- Captain John Philip Walker
- Captain John Charles Watson
- Captain William Thomas Webley
- Lieutenant Herbert Gray Welsford
- Captain Raymond Whitaker
- 2nd Lieutenant John Charles White
- 2nd Lieutenant Thomas Willis
- Lieutenant Albert Thomas Edgar Witt
- Lieutenant Charles Harry Witty
- Lieutenant Christopher Harding Young

Women's Royal Air Force

- Administrator Matilda Theresa Talbot
- Assistant Administrator Marion Annie Thompson
- Acting Assistant Commandant Olive Eleanore Tibbits
- Superintendent Charlotte Bathasar Gething (Woking)

=== Civil Division ===
- Katharine Acland, Secretary, Hertfordshire Branch, British Red Cross Society; Organiser of "Herts Day," "Our Day," etc.
- Frank Adams, Photographic Department, Ministry of Information
- John Adams
- Robert Ernest Kennedy Adams, Divisional Commander, Metropolitan Special Constabulary
- Jean Reid Aitken, Training School for Teachers of Domestic Subjects, Preston
- Edgar Alcock, Director ana Works Manager, The Hunslet Engine Company Limited
- Stanley Walter Alexander, Ministry of Information
- Arthur Joseph Allnutt, Surveyor, Department of the Administrator of Works and Buildings, Air Ministry
- Emma Amor, Quartermaster of the Windsor Road Auxiliary Hospital, Barry, Glamorganshire
- Annie Maria Anderson, Assistant to the Parliamentary and Financial Secretary, Ministry of Munitions
- Charles Henry Andrews, Civil Engineer, Department of the Administrator of Works and Buildings, Air Ministry
- Leonard Andrews, Progress Superintendent, Metropolitan Munitions Committee
- Elsie Barbara Armitage, Honorary Secretary and Head of the British Soldiers' Institute, Boulogne
- Captain George Arnold, Master of the Transport Rother
- Matthew Mather Ascough, Chief Engineer, Mercantile Marine
- Arthur Ashton, House Steward to the Lord Mayor of Newcastle
- William Stacey Aslett MRCS LRCP Medical Officer, Knighton Auxiliary Hospital, Leicestershire
- Arthur Astin, Collector of Customs and Excise, Aberdeen
- May Clara Crofton Atkins
- Harold Waring Atkinson, Honorary Librarian, British Prisoners of War Book Scheme
- George Ayrton, Hut Superintendent, Church Army, First-Army Area
- Indiana Richenda Backhouse, Commandant, Lydney Auxiliary Hospital, Gloucestershire
- William Baigent Officer-in-Charge, Northallerton Auxiliary Hospital, Yorkshire
- Ada Mary Baker, Salvation Army
- Francis Livingstone Ball, Assistant Inspector of Carriages, Glasgow Area, Ministry of Munitions
- Alice Liardet Ballantine, Quartermaster, Crag Head Auxiliary Hospital, Bournemouth
- Eva Hermione, Lady Baring, Commandant, Northwood House Auxiliary Hospital, Cowes, Isle of Wight
- Edith Madge Barling, Commandant, Mayfield Auxiliary Hospital for Officers, Birmingham
- Henry Arthur Barlow, Staff Clerk, War Office
- Captain William Tait Barlow, Assistant Director, Liner Department, New York Office, Ministry of Shipping
- Edith Helen, Lady Barnes, Royal Air Force Aid Committee
- Ada Barnett, Commandant, Kingswood Auxiliary Hospital; Quartermaster, Rust Hall Auxiliary Hospital, Tunbridge Wells
- Sir Charles Burton Harrington Bt County Director, Auxiliary Hospitals and Voluntary Aid Detachments, Limerick
- Lady Grace Barry, Vice-President, Eynesford Division, Norfolk Branch, British Red Cross Society; Organiser and Commandant of Reepham Auxiliary Hospital, Norfolk
- John Armstrong Barry, Honorary Secretary, Dundee Branch, Incorporated Soldiers' and Sailors' Help Society
- Gilbert William Barton, Works Manager, Messrs. Henry Bessemer & Company Limited
- Henry Baker Bates JP Mayor of St. Helens; Chairman, St. Helen's Advisory Committee, Ministry of National Service
- Frederick William Batten, Second Division Clerk, Land Registry
- George Richard Battle, Acting Electrical Engineer, Invergordon
- Harry Percy Baxter, Steelworks Manager, Messrs. Edgar Allen & Company Limited
- Marjorie Letitia Bazeley, Assistant Commandant, Northam Auxiliary Hospital, Devonshire
- Lieutenant John James Beard, British Red Cross Transport Officer, Southampton
- Herbert George Beazley, Section Director, Accounts Department, Ministry of Munitions
- Muriel Grace Beddow, Supervisor, Mobilization Directorate, War Office
- George Edward Bennett, Assistant to Secretary of Northern Region, Ministry of National Service
- Isaac Vaughan Bennett, Naval Store Officer, H.M. Dockyard, Haulbowline
- Charles William Best, National Service Representative, Brecon
- Joseph Bintis, Manager, Ministry of Munitions Instructional Factory, Manchester
- Janet Elizabeth Birch, Commandant, Filey Auxiliary Hospital
- Jessie Bird, Joint Manager and Distributor, Red Cross Stores, Admiralty Pier, Dover
- Henry Hodgkinson Bobart, Commandant, Red Cross Ambulance Column, Middlesex Branch, British Red Cross Society
- Theodora Bosanquet, Secretary, Home Supplies Board, and Personal Assistant to Second Secretary, Ministry of Food
- George Bourn, Manager with Coventry Ordnance Works Limited
- Thomas Bowen JP Farmer
- James Robert Bowman, Administrative Assistant, Milk Supplies Branch, Ministry of Food
- Adam Boyce, Waterguard Superintendent, Port of Liverpool
- Elliot Bradden, Representative in Hong Kong of the Finance Branch, Ministry of Shipping
- The Reverend Westby R. Brady, Senior Chaplain to the Mission to Seamen, Buenos Aires
- George Sandison Brock British Red Cross Hospital, Italy
- Herbert Cecil Brocklehurst, Assistant Inspector, Ministry of Munitions, U.S.A.
- Marial Brodie, Matron of St. John Hospital, Stabon Heath, Llanelly
- Annie Kathleen Brown, Assistant in Foreign Department, Ministry of Information
- James Brown, Chief Engineer, Mercantile Marine
- Minnie Brown, Commandant, Women's Voluntary Aid Detachment, South-port, Lancashire
- Mary Brumell, Quartermaster, 5th Northumberland Auxiliary Hospital
- John William Bullock, Chief Examiner, Exchequer and Audit Department
- Margaret Annie Bullock, Chief Clerk, Tribunal Department, Oxford, Ministry of National Service
- Nellie Bunker, Superintendent, Shorthand and Typing Section, War Cabinet Secretariat
- Alison Burley, British War Mission in U.S.A.
- Norah Dalrymple Burns, Assistant in Finance Department, Ministry of Information
- Henry Robert John Burstall, Sub-Section Director, High Explosives Contracts, Ministry of Munitions
- Frances Westbrook Burton, Norfolk Prisoners of War Help Association
- Helen Ethel Bush, Voluntary Worker, Hospital Bag Fund
- Maud Alice Bushby, Staff Quartermaster and Head of Returned Members Department, Joint Women's Voluntary Aid Detachment, Department, British Red Cross and Order of St. John
- Marjorie Alma Butcher, Assistant Principal and Secretary to Director, Women's Royal Naval Service
- John Lawrence Butler, Chief Foreman, Breech Mechanism Shop, Messrs. Wm. Beardmore and Company Limited
- Nina Butler, Wounded and Missing Enquiry Department, British Red Cross Society
- George Eskholme Buttenshaw, Sectional Engineer, Department of Engineering, Ministry of Munitions
- Edward Buxton, Ministry of Shipping
- Laura Buxton, Commandant of Catton Hall Auxiliary Hospital, Norwich
- Ernest Henry Byatt, Temporary Assistant, Commercial Branch, Ministry of Shipping
- Emma Mary Byles, Late Matron, Lambeth Infirmary, The Lady Angela Mary Alice Campbell, Commandant, St. John's Auxiliary Hospital, Sevenoaks, Kent
- Vera Harriett Antill Campbell, Assistant Establishment Omcer, Ministry of Information
- Captain Robert Edward Carey, Master Mariner, South, Eastern and Chatham Railway Company
- Rose Catharine Clanmorris Caetell, Lady Superintendent, Y.M.C.A. Town Centres, Havre
- Constance Helena Chaplin, Commandant, West Dene Auxiliary Hospital, St. Leonard's-on-Sea
- Julia Chatterton, Red Cross Work, Egypt
- Frederic Brandon Cheshire, Inspector at a National Shell Factory
- Hugh Thomas Arthur Chidgey, Divisional Commander, Metropolitan Special Constabulary
- Major Thomas Henry Church, Late Works Manager at an Explosives Factory. For courageous conduct on the occasion of a serious fire.
- Laura Churchill, Commandant, Woodlawn Auxiliary Hospital, Didsbury, Manchester
- Frederick Septimus Clay, Clerk to Nuneaton Local Tribunal
- Harry Clayton, Section Director, Accounts Department, Ministry of Munitions
- Elizabeth Clegg, Royal Dublin Fusiliers Prisoners of War Fund
- Katherine Elizabeth Cochrane, Clerk, Foreign Office
- James Wearne Cock, Assistant Director of Tea Supplies, Ministry of Food
- Elizabeth Violet Colegrave, Commandant of Princess Christian Auxiliary Hospital, South Norwood
- Frances May Coleridge, Clerk in His Britannic Majesty's Legation, Copenhagen
- Ellen Evelyn Collins, in Charge of County of London Collecting Box Department, British Red Cross and Order of St. John
- Lesbia Collins, Clerical Staff, Wheat Export Company
- Gilbert Edmond Chalmers Colona, National Service Officer
- Major John Compton TD Postmaster, Folkestone
- Matthew Connolly, Higher Division Clerk, H.M. Office of Works
- William Frederick Connolly, Staff Clerk, Finance Department, Air Ministry
- William James Connor, Chief Registrar, Admiralty
- Robert Llewellvn Wilson Cooper, Head of Telegraph Section, Ministry of Shipping
- Rvbil Florence Corkran, Voluntary Worker, Officers' Families' Fund
- Clifford John Cottle, Secretary, Church Army Friends of the Wounded
- Alonzo Cotton, Superintendent, City of Bristol Corps, St. John Ambulance Brigade
- Constance Louise Cox, Donor and Administrator, Stone House Red Cross Depot, Godalming, Surrey
- Sydney Cox, British Red Cross Commission, Mesopotamia
- Howard Wilfred Crack, Technical Assistant, Iron and Steel Production Department, Ministry of Munition Henry Crombie, Acting Staff Clerk, Secretary's Department, Admiralty
- Victor Crooke, Executive Officer, Walsall Borough Food Control Committee
- Bertram Charles Cross, Acting Staff Clerk, H.M. Office of Works Audrey Crossley, Superintendent, Cable Department, British War Mission in U.S.A.
- James Culross CM Medical Officer in Charge, Newton Abbot Auxiliary Hospital, Devonshire
- James Fraser Cunninghame, Assistant to Sub-Commissioner, Trade Exemptions, Scottish Region, Ministry of National Service
- Benjamin Henry Curnow, Furniture Clerk, Board of Works, Dublin
- Gertrude Barclay Currie, Granton Minesweepers' Hut
- Captain William John Dale, Master of the Transport Archangel
- Alphonso William James Davies, Accountant, Greenwich Hospital Department, Admiralty
- John Ho well Davies, Secretary, Carmarthen War Savings Committee
- Milfred Lucy Davies, Volunteer Worker, Australian Red Cross, Egyptian Expeditionary Force
- Helen Frances Dawes, Head of Registry, Eastern Mediterranean Special Intelligence Bureau, Egyptian Expeditionary Force
- Edward George Dean, Machine Tools Department, Ministry of Munitions
- Rose Elinor Deedes, Honorary Secretary, Finsbury Local War Pensions Sub-Committee
- Rosalind Mary Denny, Wounded and Missing Enquiry Department, British Red Cross Society
- Marie Devonshire, Red Cross Work, Egypt
- Gladys Helen Dick, Welfare Supervisor at a National Projectile Factory
- Frances Joan Dickinson, British Red Cross Central Prisoners of War Committee
- Elizabeth Amy Dixon, Labour Department, Ministry of National Service
- John William Dodd, First Class Surveyor of Taxes, Inland Revenue
- Annie Dowbiggin RRC Matron, Edmonton Military Hospital
- Eva Duggan, Confidential Secretary to the President, Ordnance Committee, Ministry of Munitions
- Elsie EppieJow Duncan, Royal Scots Association
- Elizabeth Dorothea Dunlop, United Army and Navy Board
- James Dunne, Chief Superintendent, Dublin Metropolitan Police
- Terence Armiston Stewart-Dyer, Inspecting Engineer in U.S.A., Railway Materials Department, Ministry of Munitions
- Alfred Ernest East, Metropolitan Special Constabulary (Observation Service)
- Morton Frederick Eden, For services with the British Expeditionary Force, Salonika
- Alice Edgar, Matron, Rarnsgate General Hospital and Seamen's Infirmary
- Elizabeth Edmunds, Chief Lady Welfare Superintendent at one of H.M. Factories
- John Parry Edmunds, Inspector, Glamorgan Special Constabulary
- Gladys Maude Edwards, Personal Assistant to the Secretary, Ministry of Food
- Richard Edwards, Suffolk Prisoners of War Committee
- William John Eldridge, Secretarial Branch, Coal Mines Department, Board of Trade
- Kathleen Frances Elizabeth Ellery, Joint Manager and Distributor, Red Cross Stores, Admiralty Pier, Dover
- George Stanley Ellis, Temporary Assistant, Ship Management Branch, Ministry of Shipping
- Agnes Louisa Evans, Assistant Commandant, Roseneath Auxiliary Hospital, Wrexham
- Elias Ewen, Manager, Boiler Shop, Messrs. Swan, Hunter & Wigham Richardson, Limited, Newcastle
- Amy Helena Margaret Fairbank, Chief Woman Technical Assistant, Ministry of National Service
- Henry Edward Farmer, Chief Architectural Assistant, National Shipyards
- The Reverend George Erie Farren Secretary, No. 8 Red Cross Hospital, Boulogne, France
- Ethel Bessie Feiling, Assistant in Establishment Branch, Ministry of Food
- Marion Isobel Fell, Organiser and Commandant, Fairview Auxiliary Hospital, Ulverston
- Victoria Shaw Fetherstonhaugh, Voluntary Worker, Australian Red Cross, Egyptian Expeditionary Force
- George Thomas Fidler, Deputy Head of Cross Channel and Mediterranean Troops and Stores Section, Military Sea Transport Branch, Ministry of Shipping
- Mabel Clara Hawkes Field, Commandant, Whytesgates Auxiliary Hospital, Stratford-on-Avon
- Ruby Norah Figgis, Voluntary Aid Detachment, Chauffeuse, Boulogne Headquarters, British Red Cross Society
- Charles Lavington Filder, Deputy Surveyor of Lands, Admiralty
- James Arthur Findlay JP Honorary Secretary, Ayrshire Branch, Scottish Branch, British Red Cross Society
- Eliza Mary Forbes, Assistant Commandant, Chudleigh Auxiliary Hospital, Devonshire
- Ernest Foreshew, Ex-soldier Clerk, War Office
- Walter St. John Fox, Divisional Commander, Metropolitan Special Constabulary
- Captain Harry Edwin Fozard, Aeronautical Inspection Department, Ministry of Munitions
- Reginald France, Deputy Superintendent, Tools and Gauges, at a National Factory, Ministry of Munitions
- Percy Alexander Francis, Agricultural Inspector, Board of Agriculture for Scotland
- James Fraser, Outside Erector, Messrs. Sir Wm. Arrol and Co., Ltd.
- Dorothy Friend, Ministry of Information
- Alexander Moffitt Fullerton, Sailors' and Soldiers' Club, Dublin
- Agnes Lottie Gallaway, Convener, War Hospital Supply Depot, Jedburghy Roxburghshire
- Lieutenant Bernard Vincent Gander, Demonstrator, Sheffield University Discharged Officers' Training School, Ministry of Labour
- Alice Marie Gardiner, London Special Constabulary (Observation Service)
- Dorothy Gardner, Lady Worker, Y.M.C.A., Abancourt and Rouen
- The Honourable Hylda Maria Madeline Garforth, Organiser and Commandant, Brompton Auxiliary Hospital, Yorkshire; late Organiser and Commandant, Lady Sykes' Auxiliary Hospital, Eddlethorpe
- Lizzie Garner, Commandant, Auxiliary Hospital, Newark
- James Charles Garrett, Accountant, British Red Cross Society
- Eleanor Gask, Secretary, St. Bartholomew's Ladies' Guild
- Catharine Julia Gaskell, Commandant, St. Chad's Auxiliary Hospital, Cambridge
- Marguerite Gaussen, Catholic Club, Abbeville
- Robert Gentle, Accountant to the Scottish Education Department, Edinburgh
- Arthur Hereford Wykeham-George, Assistant Director of War Supplies, British War Mission in U.S.A.
- George Prowse Gilchrist, Acting Staff Clerk, H.M. Office of Works
- William James Gillespie, Farmer
- Emily Girdlestone
- Marjorie Girling, Lady Clerk, Finance Department, War Office
- Ethel Dorothy Gladwell, Assistant in Articles Section, Ministry of Information
- Olive Glanfield, Ministry of National Service
- Captain Robert Glegg, Master, Mercantile Marine
- James Hutchison Glen, Manager of Dock and Repairs Department, Messrs. Vickers, Limited
- Francesca Gluckstein
- George Henry Gordon, Chief Assistant to Director of Cross-Channel Transportation and Coal Controller, Ireland
- Sophia Augusta Graham, Late Commandant-in-Charge, Claremont Auxiliary Hospital; Commandant, Scourbank Auxiliary Hospital, Cumberland
- Alexander Philip Foulerton Grant, Sub-Section Director, Military Establishment, Ministry of Munitions
- Alice Gray
- Andrew Gray, Works Manager, The Lanarkshire Steel Company Limited
- Stanley Haldane Linford Greaves, Section Director, Factory Audit and Costs Department, Ministry of Munitions
- Margaret Bennett Green, Honorary Lady Almoner, Royal Naval Hospital, Chatham; Naval Representative, Gillingham War Pensions Committee
- George Frederick Greenham, Assistant Superintending Engineer, General Post Office
- John Gregory, First Class Surveyor of Taxes, Inland Revenue
- John Grimes, Honorary Treasurer of St. Pierre and Dynes House Auxiliary Hospitals, Cardiff
- Edith Katharine Le Gros, Head of British Red Cross Knitting Department
- Woodman Cole Grose, Staff Clerk, Finance Department, War Office
- Lady Mabel Florence Mary Grosvenor, Organiser of Y.M.C.A. Munition Canteens
- Helen Frances Hartopp Gubbins, Organiser of British Red Cross Working Parties, Cork
- Agneta Annie Justina Stepney Gulston, Assistant County Secretary, Carmarthenshire Branch, British Red Cross Society
- Sarah Gamzee Gurney, Organiser and Commandant, Ingham Auxiliary Hospital, Norfolk
- Charles Brazier Hams, Acting Deputy Naval Store Officer, Admiralty
- Evelyn Alice Hall, Organiser of Rest Station at Stourbridge, Worcestershire
- Ernest Frederick Hall, Acting Deputy Accounts Officer, Admiralty
- Margaret Gordon Hans Hamilton, War Workers' Welfare Committee, Y.W.C.A.
- Ivy Winifred Hankins, Assistant Secretary to Deputy Controller of Armament Production, Admiralty
- William Henry Hare, Minor Staff Clerk, Board of Education; Establishment Officer, National War Savings Committee
- Charles Hubert Harris, Quartermaster in charge of Transport for the Salisbury Hospitals
- Helen Harris, Assistant in Rationing Sub-Division, Ministry of Food
- Marjorie Maxwell Harris, Hull and East Riding Prisoners of War Fund
- Charles Henry Hawes, Ex-soldier Clerk, War Office
- James Waldegrave Hayes, Divisional Secretary, Y.M.C.A., Essex
- Herbert Harry Thomas Head, Private Secretary to Assistant Financial Secretary, Ministry of Munitions
- John Henry Heath, Staff Clerk, Finance Department, Air Ministry
- Marion Heelis, Commandant-in-Charge of Auxiliary Hospital, Appleby, Westmorland
- Charles Allen Henderson JP
- Hubert Douglas Henderson, Secretary, Cotton Control Board
- Laura Catharine Henderson, Naval Intelligence Division, Admiralty
- Violet Henderson, Honorary Superintendent of a National Factory Canteen
- The Honourable Sylvia Laura Henley, Organiser of Y.M.C.A. Munition Canteens
- George Henshilwood, Post Office Executive Engineer, South-Eastern District
- Thomas Hepburn, Member of Appeal Tribunal for Stirling, Dumbarton and Clackmannan
- Caroline Herford, Commandant, Rest Station, Mayfield, Lancashire
- Reginald Hewett, Chief Accountant, Royal Commission on Sugar Supply
- Edwin Percy Hewkin, Head of Sugar Shipments Section, Commercial Branch, Ministry of Shipping
- Ivy Lenore Heywood, Junior Administrative Assistant, Ministry of Shipping
- Corona Hicks, Divisional Superintendent, Soldiers' Awards Branch, Ministry of Pensions
- William Thomas Highton, Accountant, Surrey Auxiliary Hospitals
- Gertrude Mary d'Arcy-Hildyard, Scottish Churches Huts, Boulogne
- George Grimmer Hilton, Temporary Civilian Supervising Clerk, War Office
- Charles Kenneth Hobson, Chief Assistant, General Economic Department, Board of Trade
- William Edward Hobson, Assistant Registrar, Colonial Office
- Lillie Hodgson, Junior Administrative Assistant, Ministry of National Service
- Anne Avery Hoffmann, Chairman of Ladies' Committee of Soldiers and Sailors Dependants Committee, Leeds
- Major Daniel de Hoghton, National Service Representative, Hampshire Area
- Ethel Mary Holden, Vice-President, Staffordshire Branch, British Red Cross Society; Organiser of Red Cross Working Depot, Walsall, Staffordshire
- Arthur William Holloway, Clerk, Local Government Board
- Constance Holt, Hydrographic Department, Admiralty
- Captain Frederick William Holt, Master Mariner, London and South Western Railway Company
- Francis William Hooper, Superintending Pharmacist, Royal Victoria Yard, Deptford
- Alexis Hore, Lady Clerk, War Office
- Sidney Adolph Horstmann, Managing Director, Horstmann Cars Limited
- Percy Thomas Horton, First Class Surveyor of Taxes, Inland Revenue
- Ethel Mary Beatrice How
- John Palmer Howard, Assistant National Secretary, Y.M.C.A.
- George Hoyle MS Commandant, The Plains and Brooksbank Auxiliary Hospital, Elland
- Frances Hughes, Late Matron of No. 1 House, St. Dunstans
- Gibbard Richard Hughes, Managing Director, Hyposol Limited
- Lizzie Huish, Salvation Army
- Gertrude Cecilia Hullett, Employment Department, Ministry of Labour
- Hilda Gertrude Overs Hulse, Commandant, Duffield Road Auxiliary Hospital, Derby
- George Oscar Humphreys, General Distribution Branch, Coal Mines Department, Board of Trade
- John Henry Hunter, Assistant Director, Frozen Beef and Provisions Department, New York Office, Ministry of Shipping
- Frances Catherine Maude Haynes Hutchinsan, Voluntary work in connection witH recruiting
- Helen Duguid Hutchison, Commandant of St. John Auxiliary Hospital, Newcastle upon Tyne
- Henry Scott Huxley, Temporary Second Class Clerk, Colonial Office
- Annie Christease Iles, Superintendent of Hostels, Ministry of Munitions
- Isabella Edith Impey, Clerk, Ministry of National Service
- Walter George Inglis, Herbert James Ireland, District Engineer, H.M. Office of Works
- Margaret Douglas-Irvine, London War Pensions Committee
- Douglas Arthur John Jackman, Secretary, Y.M.C.A., Boulogne Area
- William Henry Congreve Jackson, Managing Director, Messrs. Thomas Webb & Sons
- Dudley William Henry James, Metropolitan Special Constabulary (Observation Service)
- Herbert William James, Legal Assistant, Timber Supplies Department, Board of Trade
- Lottie, Lady Jarmay, Vice-President, Northwich Division, British Red Cross Society; Officer-in-Charge, The Ley Auxiliary Hospital, Winnington, Cheshire
- Georgina Martha Jebb, Commandant, Auxiliary Hospital, Leantwardine, Herefordshire
- Isabel Blanche Jeeves, Wounded and Missing Enquiry Department, British Red Cross Society
- Marguerite Jefferies
- Edward James Jeffrey, Acting First Class Assistant Accountant, Finance Department, War Office
- Frances Edith Jenkins, Signal Division, Admiralty
- Captain Jenkin Jenkins, Master, Mercantile Marine
- Ida Jennings, Commandant, Abington Avenue Auxiliary Hospital, Northampton
- Frederick Horace Oldershaw Jerram, Clerk, Local Government Board
- Dorothy Johnson, Assistant Commandant, Sandon Hall Auxiliary Hospital, Weston, Stafford
- Edith Clara Johnson, Secretary, Kensington War Savings Committee
- John Ben Johnson, Organiser and Head of the Baling Voluntary Aid Detachment
- Violet Charlotte Johnson, Organiser and Donor of Marsh Court Auxiliary Hospital, Stockbridge
- Violet Seymour Johnson, Donor and Administrator of Ashton Hayes Auxiliary Hospital, near Chester
- John Ewing Johnston, Veterinary Officer in Charge, Remount Depot, Belfast
- Mary Ingharn Johnston, Honorary Secretary, Leith Local War Pensions Committee
- Ethel Rose Johnstone, Honorary Organising Superintendent, Richmond War Hospital Supply Depot
- Frances Lucy Johnstone, British War Mission in U.S.A.
- Margaret Ellen Jones, Executive Officer, Amlwch Food Control Committee
- Ann Laugharne Phillips Griffith Jones, Welfare Supervisor at a National Shell Factory
- Reginald Bence-Jones DL Assistant in Labour Supply Department, Ministry of National Service
- Acting-Paymaster Thomas Lionel Jones RNR Liner Requisitioning Section, Ministry of Shipping
- William Tudor Jones, Chief Inspector at a National Shell Factory
- William Ezra Jordan, Salvation Army
- Captain George William Joy, Master of the Transport Albano
- Edward Kay, Works Manager, Messrs. Thomas Firth & Sons, Limited
- Dorothy Clarissa Keeling, Acting General Secretary, National Association of Guilds of Help; Secretary of the Joint Committee on Social Service
- Virginia Margaret Kemble, Commandant, Auxiliary Hospital, Chelmsford
- James Hutchison Kennedy, Chief Draughtsman, Messrs. Hamilton & Co., Port Glasgow
- Hilda Mary Kentish, Commandant, Registrar, and Honorary Treasurer of Wycombe Auxiliary Hospital, Buckinghamshire
- Ida Clementina Kentish, Commandant, Englethwaite Auxiliary Hospital, Armathwaite, Cumberland
- Frederick Charles Knibb, Examiner of Technical Accounts, Contracts Section, Department of the Administrator of Works and Buildings, Air Ministry
- Ada Lacey, Post Office Prisoners of War Relief Fund
- Frank Harper Lambourn, Acting Superintendent Victualling Store Officer, H.M. Dockyard, Haulbowline
- Evelyn Hamar Laming, Organiser, Donor and Commandant of Auxiliary Hospital, Alresford, Hampshire
- Richard Gilbert Lander, Staff Section, Department of the Administrator of Works and Buildings, Air Ministry
- Sidney Montem Lander, Secretary and Executive Officer, War Agricultural Executive Committee for Worcestershire
- Jessie Eleanor Langston, Superintendent of Registry, Appointments Department, Ministry of Labour
- Captain Robert James Large, Master of the Transport Caesarea
- George Latham DCM Head Clerk, Leave Section, War Office
- Maud Lattey, Red Cross Work, Egypt
- Laura Jessie Law, Secretary, St. John Ambulance Warehouse
- Thomas David Lawrence, Executive Officer, Rhondda Food Control Committee
- Frederick John Leaver, British Red Cross Central Prisoners of War Committee
- Jane Creagh Leighton, Quartermaster, Naunton Park Auxiliary Hospital, Cheltenham
- Arthur Trevor O'Bryen Leslie, Divisional Commander, Metropolitan Special Constabulary
- Leontine Isabelle Emmeline Lester, Clerk, Foreign Office
- Isabella Marion Lewin, Commandant, St. Mary's Auxiliary Hospital, Bromley, Kent
- John Mackinlay Ligat, Head of East Lancashire British Red Cross Depot
- C. H. Lightfoot, Honorary Secretary, Kobe British Women's Patriotic League
- Henry John Lile, Master of a Trinity House Vessel
- William Thomas Limming, Quartermaster, Red Cross Stores Department, Boulogne, France
- Iris le Strange Lindsell, Secretary to the Honorary Organiser, Camps Library
- The Reverend Irvine Lister, South Lancashire Regiment Prisoners of War Committee
- James Mason Little, Officer-in-Charge, Stormont House Auxiliary Hospital, Downs Park Road, London
- Fred Lloyd, Inspector of Markets and Grading, Live Stock Branch, Ministry of Food
- Arthur William Long, District Superintendent, Materials and Priority Department, Admiralty
- Rose Frances Lowman, Confidential Shorthand Typist to Third Sea Lord, Admiralty
- William Watt Lumsden, Superintendent, Cordite Department, at one of Nobel's Explosive Company's Factories
- Isabella Romanes Lyon, Organiser of Red Cross Working Parties, North Berwick
- John Corbet McBride, Accident Manager, Commercial Union Assurance Company
- John William Henry McCarthy, Master of a Trinity House Vessel
- Sarah Georgina Corbetta McClellan, County Secretary, British Red Cross Society, Brecknockshire
- William Ethrington Mace, Administrative Officer, Inspection Department, Ministry of Munitions, Canada
- Barbara Macklin, Queen Mary's Needlework Guild
- Thomas Finlay Maclean, Senior Staff Clerk, Land Division, Board of Agriculture for Scotland
- Miss McLean, Valparaíso
- John Love McNaughton VD Town Clerk, Buckle; Executive Officer of Local Food Control Committee
- Mary Bridget McNeile, Wounded and Missing Enquiry Department, British Red Cross Society
- Thomas McPherson, Chief Draughtsman, Wallsend and Slipway Engineering Company
- Bessie McRae, Superintendent of a National Factory Canteen and Principal of a Canteen Workers' Training Centre
- Maryel Alpina Magruder, Head Supervisor, Royal Naval Cordils Factory
- George Edgar Maleham, Honorary Secretary, Sheffield Division, Soldiers' and Sailors' Families Association
- Walter George Mann, Anchors and Cables Section, Materials and Priority Department, Admiralty
- Anne Massie, Scottish War Savings Office, Edinburgh
- Agnes Jessie Mauvan, Secretary to Priority Committee, Ministry of Munitions
- Lilian Edith Mawby, Commandant, Dallington House Auxiliary Hospital, Northampton
- Marion Winefrid Maxwell, Junior Administrative Assistant, Ministry of Shipping
- Irene Harriet Bourne Seaburne Bourne-May, Joint Honorary Secretary, Hospital Bag Fund
- Walter Baillie May, Secretary's Department, Admiralty
- George Healey Meakin, Borough Treasurer, Islington; Executive Officer, Islington Food Control Committee
- Mary Kidgway Meakin, Commandant, St. Joseph's Hall Auxiliary Hospital, Stone, Staffordshire
- Captain Herbert Medcalf, Works Engineer, Royal Aircraft Establishment, Ministry of Munitions
- Elizabeth Muriel Grant-Meek, Organiser of Working Parties, Wiltshire
- Alexander Horsburgh Merriles, Production Department, British War Mission in U.S.A.
- Henry Edward Dilke Merry, Assistant Inspector of Guns, Birmingham District, Ministry of Munitions
- Muriel Hermione Marion Mervyn, Private Secretary to Director of Cross-Clrannel Transportation, Ireland
- Marie Michaelis, Superintendent of Domestic Subjects under the Local Education Authority, Staffordshire
- John Middlemiss, Executive Officer, Glasgow Food Control Committee
- Joan Middleton, Temporary Registrar, Ministry of Shipping
- John William Midgley, Chairman, Keighley Borough Food Control Committee
- Henry Stephen Miles, Secretary to the Admiral Superintendent, Tyne District
- Henry Horatio Millar JP
- Helena Mary Milligan
- Janet Melanie Ailsa Mills, Lady Clerk in Military Operations Directorate, War Office
- Louise Emilia Monck, Commandant, Heatherside Auxiliary Hospital, Crowthorne, Wellington College, Berkshire
- Herbert Joseph Moore, Secretary to the Sub-Committee for Overseas Ambulance Trains
- Harold Roland Morgan, Manager of a National Shell Factory, Ministry of Munitions
- Robert Upton Morgan, Staff Clerk, War Office
- Florence Mildred Morrison, Commandant, Duffield Auxiliary Hospital, Derbyshire
- Robert Richardson Mortimer, Chief Draughtsman, The Staveley Coal and Iron Company Limited
- The Honourable Katharine Charlotte Elizabeth Stewart Muirhead, Vice-President, Fochabers District, Morayshire Branch, Scottish Branch, British Red Cross Society
- William Charles Mundy, Assistant Commandant and Honorary Treasurer, St. Fagan's Auxiliary Hospital, near Cardiff
- John Murch, Secretary, Shipwrecked Mariners' Society, Holyhead
- Ellen Theodora, Lady Murphy, Voluntary Worker, Clothing Branch, Officers' Families Fund
- Maud Kathleen Frances Neame, Commandant, The Mount Auxiliary Hospital, Faversham, Kent
- Katherine Helen Neilson, Founder and Chief Supporter of Flounders' College Auxiliary Hospital, Yorkshire
- Evelyn Helen Johnston New, Travelling, Passport and Personnel Department, British Red Cross Society
- Susan Newton, Organiser and late Commandant, Britannia Auxiliary Hospital, Whalley Range, Manchester
- Captain Thomas Nicholson, Master of the Transport, Newtownards
- Thomas Alexander Nicoll, Temporary Assistant in Wheat Section, Commercial Branch, Ministry of Shipping
- Thomas Herbert Nightingale, Headmaster, St. George's, Wellington Street, Council School, Salford
- Eleanor Millicent Norton, Commandant, Ditchling Auxiliary Hospital, Hassocks, Sussex
- Jessie Jane Jardine Norton, Queen Mary's Needlework Guild
- Owen James Oakshett, Chief Accountant, Metropolitan Munitions Committee
- John O'Byrne, Temporary Assistant, Finance Branch, Ministry of Shipping
- Major Richard Grainger Dennis O'Callaghan, Irish Recruiting Council
- Alice Ogden, Quartermaster and Secretary, Elmfield Hall Auxiliary Hospital, Accrington, Lancashire
- Charlotte Oliver, Honorary Secretary, Birkenhead Division, Soldiers' and Sailors' Families Association
- Frederick Brook Orman, Surveyor of Stores, Rosytti
- Ida Grace Victoria Orpen, Lady Superintendent, Inspection Department, Liverpool Area, Ministry of Munitions
- Major David Osborne VD Honorary Secretary, County of Fife Branch, Scottish Branch, British Red Cross Society
- William Charles Guzman, Joint Managing Director, Lord Roberts Memorial Workshops
- Frederick William Owen, Confidential Shorthand Writer, War Cabinet
- Thomas Owen, Manager, Llanelly Employment Exchange
- James Page, Assistant County Director and Organiser, St. John's Ambulance Brigade, South Shields
- William Charles Page, Section Leader and Joint Honorary Secretary, Transport Department, East Lancashire Branch, British Red Cross Society
- Thomas Abbott Painter, Assistant County Director and Joint Voluntary Aid Organiser, Middlesex Branch, British Red Cross and Order of St. John
- Nellie Hurcomb Palmer, Lady Superintendent, Regimental Pay Office, Exeter
- Frederick Richard Pascoe JP Secretary, War Agricultural Executive Committee for Cornwall
- Captain Thomas Paterson, Master of the Transport Hunsgate
- Herbert Alfred James Pawson, Chief Clerk, Recruiting Branch, Ministry of National Service
- The Reverend Francis Reginald Chassereau Payne, Leicestershire and Rutland Prisoners of War Committee
- William Sidney Pearce, Chief Inspector of Mines, Admiralty
- William Heath Peek, Master of Works at a National Projectile Factory
- Richard Penny, Staff Clerk, Scottish Office
- Sydney Perkins, Assistant Architect, First Class, H.M. Office of Works
- Louise Pauline Perot, Secretary to the Mechanical Warfare (Overseas and Allies) Department, Ministry of Munitions
- Ethel Maud Phillimore, Quartermaster, Standish Auxiliary Hospital, Stonehouse, Gloucestershire
- Alexander John Philip, Assistant Executive Officer, Gravesend Food Control Committee
- Eric Taylor Phillips, Commissioner to the Church Army in the Second Army
- Margaret Phillips, Y.M.C.A. Lady Worker at Staples
- Harold Percy Philpot, Technical Adviser for Canned Fish Trades, Ministry of Food
- Thomas Philpot JP Clerk, Local Government Board
- Evelyn Chapman Philps, Work Supervisor of Women, Associated Equipment Co., Ltd.
- Edward Llewellyn Pickles, Chief Examiner to the Air Inventions Committee
- William John Percy Player JP Chairman of the Committee, St. John's Auxiliary Hospital, Clydach, Glamorganshire
- Edmund Arthur Norman Pochin, Manufacturer of rifle gauges
- Harold Nichols Pochin, The British United Shoe Trading Company
- Major Frederick Ernest Pollard, Sub-Section Director, Technical Department, Aircraft Production, Ministry of Munitions
- Louise Rosemary Kathleen Virginia, Lady Portal, Donor and Organiser of Kingsclere House Auxiliary Hospital, Kingsclere, Newbury
- Katharine Frances Wilson Pott, Commandant, Nevill Park Auxiliary Hospital, Tunbridge Wells
- Hugh Falkenberg Powell Late Transport Officer, Cheltenham Group of Hospitals
- Lieutenant-Colonel Cecil Du Pre Penton Powney, Divisional Commander, Metropolitan Special Constabulary
- Maud Dora Josephine Prendergast, Commandant, Auxiliary Hospital, The Green, Richmond, Surrey
- Gertrude Rangeley Stanley Price, Superintendent of Hostels, Ministry of Munitions
- Richard Price, Assistant Manager, Inspection of Optical Supplies, Ministry of Munitions, Woolwich Arsenal
- Richard John Prichard, Chief Engineer of the Transport Greenore
- Herbert Charles Pride, Works Control, Shell Factory, Messrs. White, Allom & Company
- Vernon Proctor, Assistant Works Manager at one of Messrs. Cammell Laird & Company's Works
- William Clarke Putnam, Minor Staff Officer, Establishment Branch, Ministry of Shipping
- James Ramsay, Manager, Erith Works, Messrs. Vickers, Ltd.
- Katherine Sarah Marden-Ranger, Donor and Commandant, Oakenshaw Auxiliary Hospital, Surbiton
- Lilian Jane Redstone, Historical Records Branch, Ministry of Munitions
- Alice day Reed, Commandant, Auxiliary Hospital, Sid-cup, Kent
- Harbottle Reed, Commandant in charge of the detraining of patients at Exeter
- Captain Frederick William Rees, Master of the Transport Frances Duncan
- Georgina Ruth Reeve, Matron, Curative Hospital, Lord Robert's Memorial Workshops
- Captain David Alexander Reid, Master of the Oiler Transport Sunik
- Phyllis Emily Reiss, Wounded and Missing Enquiry Department, British Red Cross Society
- Evangeline Annette Harriett Rendle, Superintendent of Indexing Staff, Procurator-General's Department
- Arthur Charles Reynolds, Master of a Trinity House vessel
- Henry George Reynolds, Divisional Secretary, Y.M.C.A., South Midland District
- Caroline Maud Rhodes, Matron, Woodclyffe Auxiliary Hospital, Wargrave, Berkshire
- Francis Bartlett Richards, Assistant Superintendent (Works), Government Rolling Mills, Ministry of Munitions
- Annie Catherine Mary Richmond, Assistant Private Secretary to Minister of Labour
- Herbert Wheatley Ridsdale, Manager of Whitehead Torpedo Factory, Weymouth
- Mary Ritchie, Secretary, Westminster War Savings Committee
- Ronald Cleave Roberts, Deputy Principal Clerk, Local Organisation, Ministry of Pensions
- Annie Robertson, Welfare Supervisor, The Ebbw Vale Steel, Iron and Coal Company Limited
- Mary Elizabette Robertson, Secretary, Innerleithen District War Pensions Committee
- Robert Robertson, Executive Officer, Lowestoft Borough Food Control Committee
- Elizabeth Street Robinson, Lady Superintendent, Canadian Convalescent Home for Officers, France
- Lieutenant-Colonel Robert Hervey St. Clair Robinson, Irish Recruiting Council
- Constance Evelyn Robson, Head of Record Department, Queen Mary's Needlework Guild
- Elizabeth Jane Roche, Honorary Secretary, Borough of Baling Association of Voluntary Workers
- Henry Montague Rogers, Government Office, Isle of Man
- Rose Sophia Rogers, Honorary Secretary of Mutford and Lothingland Division, Suffolk Branch, British Red Cross Society
- Ethel Blanche Rolfe, Production Officer, Aircraft Supply Department, Ministry of Munitions
- Gladys Ethel Ross, Assistant Official, Welsh Region, Ministry of National Service
- Letitia Rotton, Temporary Woman Clerk, Ministry of Shipping
- Alexander Rule Late Superintendent, H.M. Wood Distillation Factory, Ministry of Munitions
- Alexandra Alberta Russell, Commandant, Dane John Auxiliary Hospital, Canterbury, Kent
- The Reverend Cecil Edward Russell, Organiser of Boy Scouts, Labour and Harvest Camps
- Mildred Russell, Honorary Secretary and Organiser, Petersfield Division, Hampshire Branch, British Red Cross Society
- John Albert Edgar Rusten, Chief Engineer, Mercantile Marine
- Edith Smith Ryland, Late Honorary Treasurer, Warwickshire Branch, British Red Cross Society; Commandant, Barford Hill Auxiliary Hospital, Warwick
- Elaine Marguerite Salmond, Member of London War Pensions Committee
- Howard Lewis Samson, Production Department, British War Mission in U.S.A.
- Percy William Sandwell, Deputy Assistant Head Clerk, War Cabinet Secretariat
- Joseph Savage, Chemist, The Castner-Kellner Alkali Company Limited
- Daniel Benjamin Sheriff Saville, Chief Engineer on Post Office Cable Ship Monarch
- Ina Lochhead Scott, Accountant-General's Department, Admiralty
- Captain John Scott, Master, Mercantile Marine
- Donald Stuart Shaw, Provost of Fort William
- Elsie Marie Shaw, Lady Clerk, War Office
- John Tresidder Sheppard, Deputy Assistant Censor, War Office
- Walter Henry Foster Shipley, Acting Deputy Accounts Officer, Accountant-General's Department, Admiralty
- Albert Edward Shorter, Senior Assistant Inspector, Munitions Areas, Sheffield
- Samuel Sidebottom, Inspector (Honorary), Surveyor-General of Supplies Department, War Office
- James Simcock Assistant County Director for Heaton Chapel Division, Lancashire Branch, British Red Cross Society
- Frederick Simmons, Assistant to the Chairman of the Industries Committee, War Priorities Committee
- Captain David Simpson, Master of the Transport Wandby
- Richard Edward Skipwith, Technical Assistant to Director of Army Contracts
- Quintin Fleming Slater, National Service Representative, Liverpool
- Captain Edward Slator, Accountant, British Red Cross Commission, Egypt
- Leonard Lansdell Slaughter, Section Commander, Kent Special Constabulary
- John Manson Smart, Honorary Secretary, Nairnshire Branch, Scottish Branch, British Red Cross Society
- Arthur Ives Smith, Registry Official, Eastern Region, Ministry of National Service
- Ernest Arthur Smith, Technical Assistant for Fuel, H.M. Office of Works
- Lewis William Smith, Chief Foreman, Howitzer Shop, Messrs. William Beardmore and Company Limited
- Noel William Kelland Isbister Smith, Assistant Private Secretary to the Secretary of State for Air
- Ethel Downing Smyth, Secretary, Hackney War Savings Committee
- John Cecil Smyth Commandant and Medical Officer, Fairfield Auxiliary Hospital, Malvern
- Mabel Janet Soames, Organiser of Red Cross Working Parties and Hospital Sugar Distribution for the County of Wiltshire
- Henry Wilkinson Solly, Chief Engineer of the Transport Jabiru
- Guy Sparrow, Honorary Central Commissioner, Church Army, Rouen District
- Jessie Aubrey Spearman, Organiser of Red Cross Working Parties, Devonshire
- William David Spellar, Manager of Red Cross Garages at Ealham and Dulwich
- Alfred Spence, Officer-in-Charge of Printing Section, Ministry of Information
- Gladys Marion Spencer, Assistant in Photographic Department, Ministry of Information
- William Arthur Spencer, Acting 1st Class Assistant Accountant, War Office
- Susan Stack, County of Staffordshire Association of Voluntary Workers
- James Stan worth, Managing Director, Messrs. J. Stanworth & Brothers
- Thomas William Starbuck, Salvation Army
- Alfred Steele, Salvation Army
- Reginald Johns Steele, Head of Textile Section, Royal Commission on Wheat Supplies
- William Lees Stenning JP Works Officer, Timber Supplies Department
- George Douglas Stevens, Manager, The Chilworth Gunpowder Co., Ltd.
- Arnold Stevenson, Chief Chemical and Technical Assistant in the Optical Munitions Department, Ministry of Munitions
- Stansmore Leslie Dean Macaulay Stevenson, Scottish Churches Hut, General Headquarters, France
- Edward Pakenham Stewart, Ex-soldier Clerk, War Office
- Isabella Forbes Stewart, Manager, Scottish Soldiers Club, Rouen
- James Stewart, Chief Engineer of the Transport Boukadar
- William Alexander Stewart JP Executive Officer, City of Aberdeen Food Control Committee
- Edward Barlow Stocker, Assistant County Director for Transport, and Joint Honorary Secretary, Nottinghamshire Branch, British Red Cross Society
- Swinton Stoddart, Chief Draughtsman, Messrs. Thompson & Sons, Sunderland
- Madel Louise Stokes, Matron, No. 2 Anglo-Belgian Red Cross Hospital, Calais
- Lieutenant Wilfred Robinson Storey, For an act of gallantry on the occasion of a fire at a Munitions Factory
- Ruby Stubbington, Lady Superintendent, The South Metropolitan Gas Company
- Robert Wallace Sturgeon, Assistant Secretary, National Maritime Board
- Alexander Sutherland, Secretarial Branch, Coal Mines Department, Board of Trade
- Kathleen Alice Sutton, Assistant Secretary, Works Construction Sub-Committee, War Priorities Committee
- William Swire, Secretary, Fleetwood War Savings Committee
- Mabel Edith Swornsbourne, Registrar of Ships and Cargoes, Procurator-General's Department
- Captain George Sykes, Royal Air Force Purchasing Department, British War Mission in U.S.A.
- William North Symonds, Transport Officer, East Lancashire Branch, British Red Cross Society
- Francis Harold Cass Tallack, Commandant of Bearers, London Ambulance Column, British Red Cross Society
- Mary Elizabeth Tanner, British Committee, French Red Cross
- Richard Frederick Charles Tear, Superintendent, Boundary Department, Ordnance Survey
- John Teasdale, Chief Draughtsman, Messrs. Hawthorn, Leslie & Company, Newcastle upon Tyne
- Mabel Tebbitt, Quartermaster and Head Cook, St. Mark's Auxiliary Hospital, Broadwater Down, Tunbridge Wells
- Elfrida Stella Temple, Voluntary Aid Detachment, Ambulance Driver, British Rei Cross Convoy, Trouville, France
- Arnold Thomas, Executive Officer, Hertford Food Control Committee
- William Henry Thomas, Founder of the Montenegrin Red Cross and Relief Fund
- Captain Frank Thompson, Master of the Transport Ludworth
- George Tyrrell Thompson DSC Master of a Trinity House Vessel
- Captain David Thomson, Aeronautical Timber Supplies, British War Mission in U.S.A.
- John Thomson, Works Manager, Messrs. Sir William Arrol & Co., Ltd.
- Margaret Ellen, Lady Thomson, Vice-President, Hertfordshire Branch, British Red Cross Society
- Annie Marion Thome, Assistant Secretary, Small Arms Committee, Ministry of Munitions
- Henry Thomas Timbury, Office of Admiral Superintendent, Glasgow
- Edith Pelham Tindall, Commandant, Wainfleet Auxiliary Hospital, Lincolnshire
- Arthur Bramble Tipping, President of Local Branch of Queen Mary's Needlework Guild, New Orleans
- John Thomas Todd, Chairman of the Blackwell Rural District Food Control Committee; Member of the Nottingham City & County Distribution Committee
- Edward Sergent Toghill, Purchasing Department, British War Mission in U.S.A.
- John Tonkin, Mayor of Truro; Chairman of Local Tribunal, and other local War Committees
- Edith Toomer, Head of Motor Ambulance Record Department, British Red Cross Society
- Rosalinde Cecil Townley, Commandant, Fulbourne Auxiliary Hospital, Cambridge
- Sarah Emuss Trehearne, Queen Mary's Needlework Guild
- Major Alfred Bond Trestrail VD JP Commandant, Auxiliary Hospital, Clevedon, Somersetshire
- Harry Philip Tufnail, Officer-in-Charge, Havre Motor Ambulance Convoy, British Red Cross Society, France
- John Turnbull, Deputy Superintendent at a National Projectile Factory
- William Arthur Tutcher, First Class Clerk, Ministry of Pensions
- Dorothea Tweedy, Commandant, St. Mary's Auxiliary Hospital, Bromley, Kent
- William James Upton, Executive Officer, Bristol Food Control Committee
- Catherine Valentine, Queen Mary's Needlework Guild
- Emily Eve Lellam Vaux, Late Quartermaster, Hammerton House Auxiliary Hospital, Sunderland
- George Edward Sidebottom Venner, Metropolitan Special Constabulary (Observation Service)
- Frances Medlicott Vereker, Assistant, Commandant, Salcombe Auxiliary Hospital, Devonshire
- Lieutenant Benjamin William Vigo, British Red Cross Society and Order of St. John, Mesopotamia
- William Hart Waddingham, Chief Designer, Elswick Ordnance Works
- Thomas Wain, Commandant, Red Cross Transport, Chester
- Eliza Bagshawe-Walker, District Lady Superintendent, Western District, Central Stores Department, Ministry of Munitions
- Captain Percy Walker, Shore Captain, South-Eastern and Chatham Railway, Boulogne
- Agnes Kendall Wallace, Honorary Secretary, Wigtownshire Branch, Scottish Branch, British Red Cross Society
- John Wallace CM Commandant, Ashcombe House Auxiliary Hospital, Weston-super-Mare
- John Walters, Administrator of Baldwin's Auxiliary Hospital, Griffithstown, Monmouthshire
- Colonel Arthur John Hanslip Ward VD DL Town Clerk of Harwich
- Jeannie Wright Ward, Secretary of Recreation Huts, Y.W.C.A., Southern Command
- Frances Jane Warrack, Head of the Scottish Churches Club, Boulogne
- Edith Mary Warren, Junior Administrative Assistant, Ministry of Shipping
- May Constance Flora Waterfield, Superintendent, General Service at Military Hospital, Dartford, Kent
- Frances Waterson (to date 4 June 1917.)
- Eva Gordon Watson, Queen Mary's Needlework Guld
- Charles Haynes Watts, Collector of Customs and Excise, Grimsby
- Captain Arthur Way, Master of the Transport Gregynog
- Philip Greville Hugh Way, Secretary, Grantham and Claypole War Savings Committees
- John Johnson Weakner, Master of the Institution of the Darlington Union
- Avice Webster, Organiser of Voluntary Workers, Woolwich Arsenal
- Caroline Rachel Selina Priscilla Weigall, Commandant, Casualty Station, Richborough Camp, Sandgate
- Jessie Muriel Kemp-Welch, Commandant, Paddington Auxiliary Hospital, London
- Victor Ernest Wells, Salvation Army
- George Seton Veitch Wenley, British Red Cross Central Prisoners of War Committee
- James Grey West, Assistant Architect, Second Class, H.M. Office of Works
- Edith Hilda Wharton, Commandant, Beech Green Auxiliary-Hospital, Withyham, Sussex
- Captain Christopher William Wheatley, Late Chief Assistant Director of Aeronautical Supplies, British War Mission in U.S.A.
- Florence Louisa Felicia Bourne-Wheeler, Sherwood Foresters Prisoners of War Care Committee
- Frances Henrietta Whitaker, Organiser of Red Cross Work in West Belfast
- Alfred Kershaw Whitehead, Secretary, Whickham-on-Tyne War Savings Committee
- Maude Lillian Whitehead, Commandant, Escrick Park Auxiliary Hospital, Escrick, Yorkshire
- Edith Whitt, Teacher of Domestic Subjects in Schools, Local Education Authority, Leeds
- Edward Charles Wilford, Temporary Surveyor, War Office
- Harry William John Wilkinson, Second Division Clerk, War Office
- Albert George Williams, Principal Observer, Optics Division, National Physical Laboratory
- William Henry Williams, Treasurer and Honorary Secretary, Bristol Branch, Soldiers' and Sailors' Families Association
- William Henry Williams, Managing Director, The Aston Chain and Hook Company Limited
- Nellie Pratchett Willmot, Commandant, The Vicarage Auxiliary Hospital, Coleshill, Warwickshire
- John William Willoughby, Superintendent, Salford Special Constabulary
- Dorothy Holmes Wilson, Superintendent of Registry, War Cabinet Secretariat
- Edith Marguerite Wilson, Personal Assistant to the Food Controller
- Helen Wilson, Y.M.C.A. Lady Worker, Boulogne
- Captain Charles Wilyman, Master of the Transport Andres
- Arthur Wellesley Winder County Director, Auxiliary Hospitals and Voluntary Aid Detachments, County Cork
- Arthur Whalesby Windsor, Sub-Section Director, Contracts Department, Ministry of Munitions
- Fred Augustus Wing, Head of Controller's Copying Branch, Admiralty
- Mildred Marion Winter, Queen Mary's Needlework Guild
- William Henry Wood, Timber Supplies Department, Board of Trade
- Esther Woodhead, Administrative Assistant, Recruiting Department, Ministry of National Service
- Sidney John Woodward, Works Manager, War Refugees Camp, Earl's Court
- Hugh Wright, Chief Meat Agent, Meat Supplies Branch, Ministry of Food
- Frances Mary Wyld, Commandant, The Club Auxiliary Hospital, Mortimer, Berkshire
- Frederick Grant Wynne, Master of a Trinity House Vessel
- Alfred Yockney, Secretary to the Pictorial Propaganda Committee
- Captain William Edward Young, Divisional Commander, Metropolitan Special Constabulary
- Herbert William Younghusband, Temporary Assistant, Naval Sea Transport Department, Ministry of Shipping

British India

- Ebrahim Ahmed, alias Be Shwe Mya, Wolfram Mine and Rice Mill-owner, Burma
- Juliet Alexander, United Provinces
- Henry Armitstead, Deputy Superintendent, Carriage and Wagon Department, North-Western Railway
- Shaikh Mahbub Bakhsh, Extra Assistant Commissioner, Soneput, Punjab
- Raymond Thomas Barker, Deputy Superintendent of Police, Karachi
- Betty Beachcroft, Calcutta National Indian Association Branch of Lady Carmichael War Fund, Bengal, Assistant Commissary and Honorary Lieutenant William Beard, India Miscellaneous List (retired)
- Arthur Russell Bennett, Customs Department, Bombay
- Margaret Wilke Bhore, Cochin
- Shapurji Bomanji Billimoria, Tardeo, Bombay
- George Birch, Assistant to Commissioner in Sind
- Muriel Black, Red Cross Depot, Lahore, Punjab
- Margaret Brent, Bombay
- Charles Cecil Trelawny Brereton, District Traffic Superintendent, North-Western Railway, Rawalpindi, Punjab
- Frederick Percival Buckner, Superintendent, Foreign and Political Department, Government of India
- Bryce Chudleigh Burt, Deputy Director of Agriculture, United Provinces
- Maung Maung Bya, A.T.M., Assistant Registrar, Co-operative Societies, Burma
- Lala Fateh Chand, Sahni, Extra Assistant Commissioner, Gujrat, Punjab
- Pandit Narayan Chand, Zaildar of Khad, Hoshiarpur District, Punjab
- Lala Ram Chandar, Chandarnagar, Punjab
- Lieutenant Claude Willoughby Cole, Agent, Bank of Madras, Bangalore
- Joseph Veasy Collier, Deputy Conservator of Forests, Haldwani, United Provinces
- John Cowan, Inspector of Factories, Bengal
- Hubert Crawford, Customs Department, Bombay
- Charles Arthur Cuttriss, Secretary, Burma Chamber of Commerce
- Sunbai Kaikobad Dastur, Women's Branch Depot, Poona
- Marion Davidson, Sind Women's Branch Depot, Bombay
- Sarojini De Chittagong, Bengal
- Kendall Hamilton Dennis, Assistant to Chief Engineer, Bengal and North-Western Railway, Gorakhpur, United Provinces
- Walter Clement Goddard Dunne, Court of Wards, Sitapur, United Provinces
- Ernest Henry Huish Edye, Indian Civil Service, Assistant Commissioner, Jhansi, United Provinces
- Mildred Fanny Eggar, Calcutta National Indian Association Branch of Lady Carmichael's Bengal Women's War Fund, Bengal
- Mabel Franklin, Honorary Secretary, Young Men's Christian Association, Multan, Punjab
- Sydney Hugh Glackan, Postmaster, Simla
- Bernard Francis Gomes, Indian Telegraph Department
- Isabel Greaves, Honorary Secretary, Depot of Lady Carmichael's Bengal, Women's War Fund, Calcutta
- Quah Cheng Guan, Municipal Commissioner, Tavoy, Burma
- Maulvi Muhammad Savan Habib, Bihar and Orissa
- Mian Abdul Hai, Pleader, Ludhiana, Punjab
- Frederick Joseph Hall, Government of India Press, India
- Ernest Walter Hammond, Inspector of Factories, Bengal
- Anita Harvey, Baptist Mission, Calcutta
- Robert William Hind, Assistant Honorary Secretary of Dera Ismail Khan Centre of St. John Ambulance Association, North-West Frontier Province
- Captain Richard Howard Hitchcock, District Superintendent of Police, Madras (on military duty)
- Chaudhri Nabi Jan, Tahsildar, Moradabad, United Provinces
- The Reverend Frederick William Jarry, Baptist Missionary, Bihar and Orissa
- Thomas White Johnstone, Inspector of Factories, Bombay
- Sardar Bahadur Sardar Abdul Rasfaid Khan, Sbahwani, Kalat, Baluchistan
- Khan Sahib tinned Mir Khan, Resaldar-Major, Zhob Militia, Baluchistan
- Khan Bahadur Ain-ud-Din Khan, Merchant and Honorary Magistrate, Quetta, Baluchistan
- Chaudhri Ali Akbar Khan, Extra Assistant Commissioner, Attock, Punjab
- Malik Allah Bakhsh Khan, Tiwana, Extra Assistant Commissioner, Gujrat, Punjab
- Honorary Captain Malik Ghulam Muhammad Khan, Tiwana, K.B., S.B., Khushab, Punjab
- Honorary Captain Subedar-Major Khan Bahadur Kurban Ali Khan, 14th Sikhs, Kamra, Punjab
- Khan Bahadur Mohammed Ashraff Khan, Poonch, Kashmir State
- Khan Bahadur Munshi Muhammad Ali Khan, Honorary Magistrate, Cawnpore, United Provinces
- Khan Bahadur Musa Khan, Provincial Service, North-West Frontier Province
- Khan Bahadur Sohbat Khan, Gola Buledi, Baluchistan
- Khan Bahadur Sardar Wahab Khan, Panezai Kakar, Baluchistan
- Cecil William Kirkpatrick, Superintendent, Foreign and Political Department, Government of India
- Captain Lionel Edward Kirwan, 1st Madras Guards, Madras
- Malcolm Rataji Kothawala, Deputy Superintendent of Police, Bombay
- Louis Patrick Lajoie, Customs and Excise Department, Bikaner State
- Chaudihri Kishori Lai, Health Officer, Muttra, United Provinces
- Ilinabai Lalkalka, Women's Branch Depot, Bombay
- Ernest Lane, Superintendent, Chota Nagpur Mica Syndicate, Kodarma, Bihar and Orissa
- Charles Frederick Langer, Controller of Stores, Oudh and Rohilkhand Railway
- Frank Langley, Pilot Service, Bengal
- John Lapraik, Bank of Bengal, United Provinces
- Alexander Samuel Lawrence, Superintendent, Home Department, Government of India
- Arthur John Leach, Managing Partner, Taylor & Co., Madras
- Milton Leach, Jail Department, Bengal
- Major Frederick Reginald Lee, Principal, Government School, Taunggyi, Burma
- Charles Thomas Letton, Government Central Press, Simla
- Surgeon Cecil Henning Lincoln, Acting Consul, Mohammerah, Persian Gulf
- Bai Champabahen Manibhai, Shethanij Kapadwanj, Bombay
- David Barry Mann, Inspector of Factories, Bengal
- Christina May
- Duncan Louis McPherson, Eastern Bengal State Railway (Indian-Munitions Board)
- Homia Mehta, Calcutta National Indian Association Branch of Lady Carmichael War Fund, Bengal
- Shaikh Yakub Vazir Muhammad, Provincial Service, Thar and Parkar, Sind
- Bhalchandra Varnan Mule, Sholapur, Bombay
- Khagendra Chandra Nag, Secretary, Mymensingh Recruiting Committee, Bengal
- Pandit Anand Narayan, Dehra Dun, United Provinces
- Rai Bahadur Amar Nath, Sub-Registrar, Lahore, Punjab
- Lala Baij Nath, Officiating Civil Surgeon, Jhelum, Punjab
- Zoe Ellesmere Davidson Newton, Shiraz, Persia
- Malik Sahib Khan Nun, Extra Assistant Commissioner, Gujranwala, Punjab
- Maung Nyun, A.T.M., Proprietor, Star of Burma Press, Mandalay, Burma
- Captain Malcolm Ostrehan, Assam Military Police
- Rajaram Tukaram Padam, Bombay
- Pandit Bhola Dat Pant, Assistant Recruiting Officer, Bareilly
- Babu Rajani Kanta Pattadar, Recruiting Agent, Ranchi District, Bihar and Orissa
- Dorothy Penuell, Prome, Burma
- Winifred Ward Perkins, in charge of Amherst Branch of Red Cross Depot, Burma
- John Ruskin Phillips, Locomotive and Carriage Superintendent, Burma Railways
- Hari Krishna Pillay, Chetty, President, Madras Hindu Association, Rangoon, Burma
- Julian Hugh Price, Deputy Magistrate and Deputy Collector, Cuttack, Bihar and Orissa
- Hirabai Pudumji, Women's Branch Depot at Poona, Bombay
- Rai Bahadur Biswambhar Rai, Vice-Chairman, District Board, Bengal
- Vidhyagouri Ramanbhai, Honorary Secretary of the Women's Branch, Ahmedabad War Relief Fund, Bombay
- Charles Herbert Roberts, War Relief Fund, Bombay
- Michael Anthony Rozario, in charge of the Records of the Baghdad Residency, Persian Gulf
- Commissary and Honorary Major Alfred James Ruegg, India Miscellaneous List, Army Headquarters
- Kunvari Rupalbai Saheb, of Limbdi, Bombay
- Rai Bahadur Saligram, Ghazipur, United Provinces
- Babu Panchanan Sarkar, Rajshahi, Bengal
- Bawa Bhag Singh, Extra Assistant Commissioner, Kalsia, Punjab
- Lieutenant Ishar Singh, Benares State Service
- Munshi Sundar Singh, Honorary Secretary, Gujranwala War League, Punjab
- Maude Stewart, War Work Depot, Calcutta
- Mary Swan, War Work Depot, Calcutta
- Charles Lewis Taylor VD Traffic Manager, Oudh and Rohilkhand Railway
- Commissary and Honorary Major Thomas Taylor, India Miscellaneous List, Personal Assistant to Chief of General Staff, Army Headquarters
- Mesrup Thaddeus, Extra Financial Assistant, Basrah
- Commissary and Honorary Major Theophilus Thorne, Indian Ordnance Department, Karachi, Bombay Presidency
- Muriel Clara Turner, United Provinces
- William Jameson Tomes, Deputy Locomotive Superintendent, Jamalpur, East Indian Railway
- Harry Finnis Wagstaff, Retired Merchant, Mussoorie, United-Provinces
- Margaret Dewar Walker, Secretary, Railway Section, Gorakhpur Red Cross, United Provinces
- Frederick Blunt Wathen, General Traffic Manager, Madras and Southern Mahratta Railway
- Honorary Lieutenant-Colonel George Richard Webb VD General Stores Superintendent, Great Indian Peninsula Railway
- Helen Owen Welman, Library Department, Poona War and Relief Fund, Bombay
- May Julia Whitcombe, Women's Branch Depot, Poona, Bombay Presidency
- Florence Williamson, Women's Branch Depot, Bombay
- Horace Williamson, Superintendent of Police, Allahabad, United Provinces

Egypt

- George William Thomas Shapley, Y.M.C.A., Cairo
- William Baker Patterson, Sudan Civil Service, attached to the Residency Staff

Sudan

- George Wilfred Bennett, Commercial Intelligence Bureau
- Robert Victors Bardsley, Sudan Civil Service
- Gerald Edwin Warder, Sudan Government Railways and Steamers
- Arnold John Forster, Finance Department, Sudan Government

Honorary Members

- Sheikh Fuad El Khatib, Official of the Hedjaz Government
- Hussein Effendi Ruhi, Arabic Secretary to the British Mission in the Hedjaz
- Ayoub Effendi Kemeid, Translator in the Ministry of Finance
- Mohammed Bey Wahid El Ayoubi, prominent Egyptian Notable
- El Seyyid Abdel Rahim El Demerdash, Member of the Legislative Assembly
- Eidarius Bey El Hoot, Omda of Salhia
- Mohammed Ali Suliman Bey, Member of the Legislative Assembly
- Dr. Ali Effendi Fahmi El Shiati, Principal Medical Officer, Benha Hospital
- Sheikh Ahmed El Tayib El Hashim, Grand Mufti, Sudan
- Several Sudanese nāẓirs:
  - Sheikh Ali Tom, Nazir of the Kababish Tribe
  - Sheikh Ibrahim Musa, Nazir of the Hedendowa Tribe
  - Sheikh Abdullah Awad El Kerim Abu Sim, Nazir of Shekria Tribe
  - Sheikh Abdul Azim Bey Khalifa, Nazir of the Ababda Tribe

== See also ==
- 1919 New Year Honours - Full list of awards.
