= Norah Fulcher =

English watercolour portrait artist (1867–1945)

Norah Manning Fulcher (1867–1945), was a commercially successful watercolour portrait artist, living and working in London for four decades, between 1898 and 1939.

== Early life and art education ==
Norah Fulcher was born in November 1867 in Burbage, Wiltshire, the second child of four born to the local doctor, George Frederick Fulcher and his wife, Jessie. Her grandparents were a millwright, dressmaker, builder, and home maker.

She attended the Holy Trinity Convent boarding school in Oxford, along with her elder sister, Margaret. By 1888 the family had moved to Chingford, Essex, where her father became the chief public health officer.

In 1888 Fulcher was a prizewinning art student at the Walthamstow School of Science and Art, and in 1895 she received her first review in The Queen, the Ladies Newspaper and Court Chronicle when she exhibited a picture called Reflections in "Pictures by Lady Artists" at the Royal Society of British Artists:

"It is a capital head and exhibits the result of thorough art training...Miss Fulcher commenced her course of study at the Walthamstow School of Art with Frank Swinstead, then went to South Kensington where she gained many prizes, migrating finally to the Bloomsbury School and to the Birkbeck Institute...". (the review named the artist as Laura Fulcher, corrected in the next issue.)

== Career ==
By 1898 Fulcher was living in London, with her own studio and accommodation at 43–45 Blenheim Crescent, Kensington. It was well situated, with privacy and a community provided by the layout – two houses with a single front door containing purpose-built artists' studios with large north-facing windows and three flats. It was owned and lived in by the oil painter Thomas Liddall Armitage, whose most well known work is The Postman, now in the Postal Museum. Several artists stayed and worked here during the 40 years that Fulcher lived here, including painter and woodblock artist Émile Antoine Verpilleux, Lily Wrangle Christie, Robert Christie, and the stained glass artist Edward Liddall Armitage (son of Thomas).

Fulcher exhibited regularly while establishing her reputation, including at the Royal Society of British Artists (1896), the Royal Academy Exhibition (1898, 1910, 1913), the Walker Gallery Liverpool (1905) and the Royal Institute of Painters in Watercolours, 93rd Exhibition (1906).

In 1906 she had a solo exhibition of 45 drawings and paintings at the Lyceum Club Gallery, which was well reviewed in The Queen and the London Evening Standard. The Lyceum Club, housed in a prestigious building in Piccadilly, had been opened by Constance Smedley in 1903. It was a place designed for social and professional networking for women, functioning in much the same way as the long established men's clubs. As Maria Quirk the art historian has observed, "portraiture provided a relatively stable and sustainable livelihood to women with the means and determination to foster their reputations and cultivate client relationships".

Her commissions were largely from the professional middle classes and landed gentry, and included Mary Brodrick, academic archeologist and Egyptologist, Arthur Mayo-Robson, pioneering surgeon and President of the British Gynaecological Society, the Hon Mrs Charles Harbord of Gunton Park, Norfolk, Mrs Hill-Whitson of Parkhill, Blairgowie, Scotland, Mrs Lyon Campbell, and Mrs Eleanor Jessie Tennent (Botet-Trydell?). Her portraits of Betty and Mollie Stearns, the young daughters of A.W. Stearns, a stockbroker, were those included in the Royal Academy Exhibition in 1910 and 1913 respectively. Other portraits have been auctioned in recent years without a subject attribution. The only portrait known to be in a public collection is Sir Arthur Mayo-Robson, which is held at Leeds University.

Fulcher's Will reveals that she had considerable commercial success. Born a doctor's daughter, she left £678,040 at 2024 values, plus a considerable amount of jewellery. The equivalent value of her father's estate when he died in 1912 after a lifetime in medicine and public health was £279,559.

Her style of portraiture was conventional and popular, enabling her to live independently and comfortably.

== Family and personal life ==
Fulcher's sisters chose more conventional paths; neither earned their own financial independence. Margaret, the oldest (known as Daisy), married Harry Siegler, an Anglo-Jewish businessman and factory owner from Manchester. She was 34, he was 9 years younger. They had a son, Eric Harry, in 1901, but Margaret died in 1914. Eric changed his surname to Sinclair, and emigrated to Western Australia in 1922, listing his occupation as a farm worker. He married Marjorie Haines in 1936.

Katharine, the younger sister, never married and continued living at home in Chingford until her father died in 1912. She was a devoted church attender, and continued to be so when she moved to Wiveliscombe in Somerset.

The youngest child and Norah's only brother, Frank Sydney Fulcher, emigrated to Hong Kong around 1899, where he worked as an assistant in the China Traders Insurance Company. He made (at least) two return visits to the UK in 1906 and 1908, returning via New York and Shanghai. He died in Shanghai five months after returning from his final visit home, aged 38.

Fulcher died on 24 June 1945. She left her jewellery (giving detailed descriptions of the pieces) to a wide circle of women friends including Mollie Thorne (née Stearns), who Norah had painted in 1913. She also left legacies to her nephew, Eric Harry Sinclair and his wife, and to Edith Emily Mocatta, a friend who was a witness at her sister Margaret's wedding in 1900, 45 years earlier.

She originally made bequests to Edward Liddall Armitage and his family who she had known for many years, but revoked them on the same day giving the reason that they were conscientious objectors.

She was politically conservative but non-conformist in belief; a long-standing member of The Ethical Church, in Bayswater. A forerunner to the Humanist movement, it espoused social reform and a sense of community rather than theological religious worship. It was about Goodness rather than Godliness, and was outside the mainstream. Archived correspondence shows Fulcher stating her disapproval with what she saw as unethical behaviour by the Church Committee. She asked for Harold Blackham, leader of the Ethical Church from 1933, to preside at her funeral.

The person closest to her was Dora Mary Saxton, a loving friend for decades. Dora was described by her cousin Sidney Waring Saxton in a 1947 letter to his cousin, Keitha as: "sweet natured and a friend to everyone". They spent winters in Bordighera in Italy together for many years, always staying in one of the best hotels, the Hotel Angst. In 1928, the year fulcher painted Sir Arthur Mayo-Robson's portrait, he was staying there with his family at the same time. Mary Brodrick also spent much time in Bordighera; it was very popular with the affluent British.

Dora Saxton was also a long-standing member of The Ethical Church, and lived within a short walk of Blenheim Crescent. In their last years they both moved to Wimbledon, living separately but in the same road. Dora died on the 17 June 1938, and Norah was the first to be named in her Will, as "my dear friend".

Fulcher asked for her own cremation to be at Golders Green, with her ashes scattered at the same spot where Dora's had been placed in 1938.

== Works ==
- Portrait of a Lady
- Portrait of a Young Lady in a Green Dress
- Portrait of a Child
- Sir Arthur Mayo-Robson

Seventeen portraits have been traced so far, but given the length of her career there must be many more.

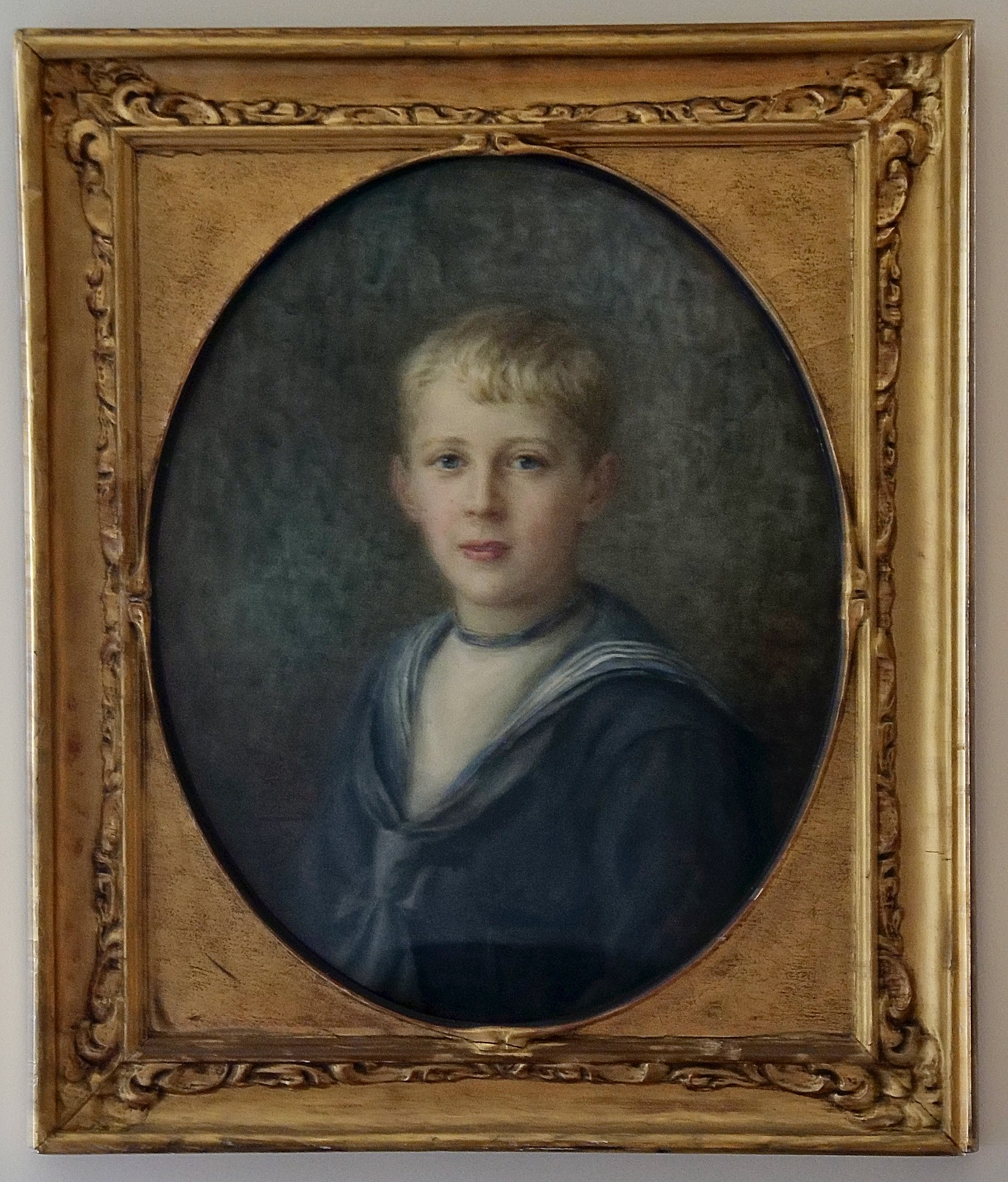
Boy in a sailor suit, painted between 1900 and 1927. Subject unknown.

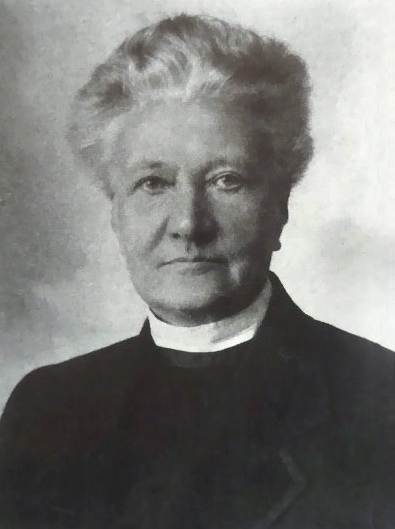
Mary Brodrick
