= Donald McMullen =

British Army general

Major-General Sir Donald McMullen KBE CB DSO
- McMullen in 1942
- Born: 27 July 1891; Putney, London
- Died: 12 November 1967 (aged 76); Gosport, Hampshire
- Military career
- Allegiance: United Kingdom
- Branch: British Army
- Service years: 1911–1948
- Rank: Major-General
- Service number: 22933
- Unit: Royal Engineers
- Conflicts: First World War; Gallipoli campaign; Salonika campaign; Sinai and Palestine campaign; 1936–1939 Arab revolt in Palestine; Second World War; Battle of France; Allied Occupation of Germany
- Awards: Knight Commander of the Order of the British Empire (1946); Commander of the Order of the British Empire (1940); Officer of the Order of the British Empire (1937); Companion of the Order of the Bath (1944); Distinguished Service Order (1918); Legion of Merit (US) (1946)

Major-General Sir Donald Jay McMullen KBE CB DSO (27 July 1891 – 12 November 1967) was a British Army officer of the Royal Engineers who served in both of the World Wars. He was the Director General of Transportation of the British Expeditionary Force in France from 1939 to 1940 and the Director General of Transportation at the War Office from 1941 to 1945.

A 1911 graduate of the Royal Military Academy, Woolwich, McMullen participated in the Gallipoli, Salonika and Sinai and Palestine campaigns of the First World War. After the war, he was seconded to the Egyptian State Railways, and he served in Palestine during the 1936–1939 Arab revolt.

On the outbreak of the Second World War in September 1939, he was appointed the Director General of Transportation of the BEF. He became Director General of Transportation at the War Office in 1941, and remained in that position for the duration of the war. After the war he served with the British Control Commission for Germany as the Deputy Chief of the Transport Division until his retirement from the Army in 1948.

== Early life ==
Donald Jay McMullen was born in Putney, London, England, on 27 July 1891, the son of John Alexander McMullen. His father served in the Royal Flying Corps during the First World War, for which he was made a Member of the Order of the British Empire in the 1919 New Year Honours.

McMullen was educated at Bradfield College and the Royal Military Academy, Woolwich. He was commissioned as a second lieutenant in the Royal Engineers on 20 July 1911. After completing his Young Officer Training at the School of Military Engineering at Chatham, Kent, he commenced a course in mechanical engineering at the Great Northern Railway's Doncaster Works. Like his father, he was interested in aviation, and obtained a Royal Aeronautical Society Certificate as a Qualified Aeroplane Pilot in 1913.

== First World War ==
On the outbreak of the First World War in August 1914, McMullen was recalled from his mechanical engineering course and became a staff officer at the War Office. In early 1915 he was assigned to the 117th (Railway) Company and sent to the Greek island of Mudros, which had been selected as an advanced base supporting the Gallipoli campaign. After the campaign ended the 117th was sent to the Macedonian front in February 1916.

McMullen then went to Egypt, where a military railway was constructed across the Sinai Desert in support of the Sinai and Palestine campaign. He was promoted to temporary captain on 25 February 1916, which became substantive on 26 June 1917, and acting major on 27 February 1917. He was awarded the Distinguished Service Order (DSO) in the 1918 New Year Honours.

== Between the wars ==
After the war, McMullen was seconded to the Egyptian State Railways. He married Evelyn Frances Packer in 1922. They had two daughters and a son. From 1 January 1930 to 1 October 1934, he was assigned to the Railway Training Centre at Longmoor as an instructor. During his time there the Longmoor Military Railway line to Liss railway station was completed in 1932, and a passenger service to Bordon railway station was opened. He conducted exercises on railway and port operations, and taught the basics of military movement control to Staff College cadets.

In January 1935, McMullen assumed command of the 1st (Fortress) Company, which was stationed at Gibraltar. It was his first assignment with no connection to railways, although he advocated the construction of a railway line from North Front to Europa Point, which was later built. His oldest daughter won the Royal Gibraltar Yacht Club's Ladies' Cup, and the two enjoyed fox hunting with the Royal Calpe Hunt. After 18 years as a major, he was promoted to lieutenant colonel on 1 April 1935.

McMullen returned to the Middle East on 1 January 1936 as Assistant Director of Transportation, Egypt, Palestine and Trans-Jordan, with the local rank of colonel. In April the Grand Mufti of Jerusalem declared a general strike. Arabs attacked Jewish settlements and communications in Palestine. The railways were particularly vulnerable. McMullen organised Royals Engineers units to maintain and repair the lines. He relinquished his command in the Middle East on 1 January 1937. For his services, he was made an Officer of the Order of the British Empire in 1937 Coronation Honours.

In July 1937, McMullen became the commandant of the Railway Training Centre at Longmoor. He oversaw preparations for a war in which great demands would be placed on transportation. The Supplementary Reserve (SR) headquarters at Longmoor was increased to three sections, with one each for railways, docks and movement control. An SR docks group was raised at York from the four railways companies, and one from the Port of London and other port authorities in the south of England. The SS Applepie was acquired for stevedore training.

== Second World War ==
On the outbreak of the Second World War in September 1939, McMullen was appointed the Director General of Transportation of the British Expeditionary Force (BEF), with the rank of brigadier. A line of communications (LOC) was established from ports in western France to the BEF advance base in north eastern France. This was mainly supported by two regular, two SR railways companies and one militia operating companies that worked closely with the French Société nationale des chemins de fer français (SNCF). Railway operations continued with aplomb in the chaos of the Battle of France, and the SNCF lost cohesion only after the German Army overran its headquarters. For his services, McMullen was promoted to the substantive rank of colonel on 1 July 1940, with seniority backdated to 1 April 1938. and advanced to a Commander of the Order of the British Empire in the 1940 Birthday Honours. His citation, written by Major General Wilfrid Gordon Lindsell, read:

He has shown marked ability, great driving power and complete self-sacrifice in developing from the outset the Transportation Services of the British Expeditionary Force. His services have been of quite outstanding merit and he has continued since the first day of mobilisation to apply himself with unremitting energy to his duties.

McMullen was appointed Director General of Transportation at the War Office, a position he held for the duration of the war. He was given the acting rank of major general on 15 May 1941, the temporary rank on 15 May 1942, and the substantive rank on 16 November 1944, with seniority backdated to 15 June 1943. The Royal Engineers Transport Service grew from 500 regular and 3,500 SR troops before the war to more than 146,000 personnel. McMullen oversaw the construction of the Haifa-Beirut-Tripoli railway and the extension of the Western Desert Railway from Mersa Matruh to Tobruk to support the Western Desert campaign. Ports in Libya were rehabilitated to support the advance of the British Eighth Army from El Alamein to Tunis. Railways in Iran were upgraded to support the Persian Corridor supply route to the Soviet Union. The Transportation Service supported the Normandy campaign, where it built the Mulberry harbour, and the subsequent campaigns in Belgium and the Netherlands and the Germany.

For his services, McMullen was created a Companion of the Order of the Bath in the 1944 Birthday Honours and a Commander of the Order of the British Empire in the 1946 New Year Honours. He was also made a Commander of the United States Legion of Merit on 17 October 1946, and of the French French Legion of Honour.

== Later life ==
In September 1946, McMullen joined the British Control Commission for Germany as the Deputy Chief of the Transport Division, a position he held until his retirement from the Army on 11 July 1948. He was appointed Honorary Colonel of the Engineer and Railway Staff Corps on 11 April 1948. He reached the age limit for officers to be eligible to be recalled on 27 July 1956 and was removed from the Reserve of Officers. He died in Gosport, Hampshire, on 12 November 1967.
