= Arthur Mayo =

Arthur Mayo is the name of:

- Arthur Mayo (VC) (1840–1920), English Naval Officer and recipient of the Victoria Cross
- Arthur Mayo (politician) (1936–2015), American politician

== See also ==
- Arthur Mayo-Robson (1853–1933), English surgeon
