= Thyra Alleyne =

Thyra Blanche Alleyne (1875–1954) was one of the first women to graduate from Durham University and, for nearly 30 years, principal of College Hall, London.

== Early life ==
Alleyne was the second daughter of Forster Alleyne of Clifton and Barbados. The Alleynes were a prominent family of plantocracy of Barbados. Her aunt was Leonora Blanche Lang (née Alleyne), wife of folklorist Andrew Lang and coauthor (with her husband) of the well-known "Coloured" Fairy Books. She was educated at Clifton High School and Durham University, from which institution she was awarded the degree of M.Litt (Master of Letters). She was one of the first women to graduate from Durham.

== Career ==
Alleyne spent ten years on the staff of St Leonards School, St. Andrews, after which she was appointed warden of Langdale Hall, Manchester. In 1916 she was appointed principal of College Hall, London. She retired from that position in 1945.

== Death ==
Alleyne died on 1 April 1954 at 14 Harrington Gardens, London SW7. She was cremated at Golders Green Crematorium.

== See also ==
- Mary Brodrick
- Sir John Alleyne, 1st Baronet
