= J. M. A. Mills =

English theosophist writer and clerk (1894–1986)

Janet Melanie Ailsa Mills MBE
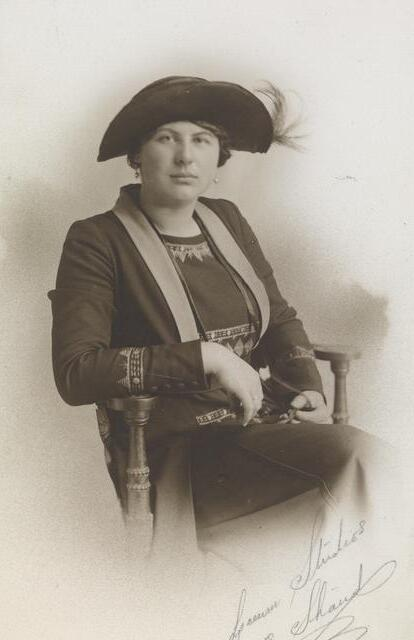
- Born: 1 April 1894; Eltham, Kent, England
- Died: 1 July 1986 (aged 92)
- Other name: H. K. Challoner
- Occupations: Theosophist, healer, writer and clerk
- Notable work: Lords of the Earth (1940); The Wheel of Rebirth: An Autobiography of Many Lifetimes (1976)
- Partner: R. Allatini

Janet Melanie Ailsa Mills MBE (1 April 1894 – 1 July 1986), also known by her writing pseudonym H. K. Challoner, was an English theosophist, healer, writer and clerk.

== Biography ==
Mills was born on 1 April 1894 in Eltham, Kent, England. She was educated in Switzerland and became a clerical worker.

During World War I, Mills worked as a "Lady Clerk" in the Military Operations Directorate of the War Office, and was appointed a Member of the Order of the British Empire (MBE) in the 1919 New Year Honours (MBE).

Mills was a theosophist and wrote books on the occult, published as J. M. A. Mills or under her pseudonym H. K. Challoner. Her novel Lords of the Earth (1940) described ancient knowledge, immortality and life on the island of Atlantis.

Mills' work The Wheel of Rebirth: An Autobiography of Many Lifetimes (1976) recounted her previous lives in Atlantis, England, Egypt, Germany, Greece, Italy and Persia. It was forwarded by the occultist Cyril Scott. Also in 1976, Mills' published The Path of Healing about healing through faith with the Theosophical Publishing House.

After fellow theosophist Rose Allatini separated from her husband Cyril Scott, Mills became Allatini's closest friend. They lived together as companions.

Mills died on 1 July 1986, aged 92.

== Publications ==
=== As J. M. A. Mills ===
- The Tomb of the Dark Ones (1937)
- Lords of the Earth (1940)

=== As H. K. Challoner ===
- Regents of the Seven Spheres (1966)
- The Wheel of Rebirth: An Autobiography of Many Lifetimes (1976)
- The Path of Healing (1976)
- The Psychic Thread (1983)
