= Anna Anderson Morton =

British egyptologist

Anna Anderson Morton (1867–1961) was a British Egyptologist and one of a group of women active in that area at that time.

She was a student at University College London from 1884 to 1902, where she studied under Flinders Petrie as a member of the group known as the "Petrie Pups" (which also included Mary Brodrick, who collaborated with Morton in co-authoring a dictionary of Egyptian Archaeology and a scholarly article in the PSBA).

She translated Gaston Maspero's Au temps de Ramses et d'Assourbanipal into English which was published as Life in Ancient Egypt and Assyria. Her death was registered in the Croydon district of Surrey.

== Selected publications ==
- Maspero, Gaston. Life in Ancient Egypt and Assyria. Chapman & Hall, London, 1892. (Translator)
- "The Tomb of Pepu ankh (khua), near Sharona". PSBA, 21 (1899), pp. 26–33. (With Mary Brodrick)
- A Concise Dictionary of Egyptian Archaeology: A handbook for students and travellers. Methuen, London, 1902. (With Mary Brodrick)
