= Mary Brodrick =

British archaeologist and egyptologist

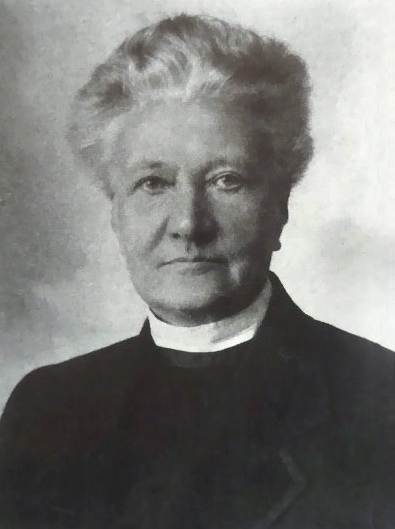
Mary Brodrick

Mary (May) Brodrick FRGS (5 April 1858 – 13 July 1933) was a British archaeologist and Egyptologist who was one of the first female excavators in Egypt. She persisted in her studies despite the initial opposition of her tutors and fellow students and achieved distinction in her field. The Daily Mail described her in 1906 as "perhaps the greatest lady Egyptologist of the day".

== Early life ==
Brodrick was born at 18 Navarino Terrace, Dalston, Middlesex (now London), in 1858, the eldest daughter of Thomas and Mary Brodrick. Thomas Brodrick was a solicitor, and the 1861 census shows the family living within the Liberty of the Close, in the grounds of Salisbury Cathedral, Wiltshire. Mary Brodrick had sisters Edith and Ethel. A brother, Thomas, born around 1862, died in South Africa in 1888.

Brodrick was the first woman to study Egyptology under Gaston Maspero at the Sorbonne, and Hebrew and Semitic archaeology under Ernest Renan at the Collège de France. Neither had been encouraging at first. Maspero had objected, "But we do not take little girls here", and Renan had vowed "I have never taught a woman in my life, and I never will". When Brodrick insisted on attending, Maspero took the matter up with the Sorbonne council who found nothing in the rules to prevent a woman attending. According to Brodrick, Maspero warned her that she would "probably have a very bad time" and indeed when she first attended she found the students to be rough, rude, and smelly. On one occasion they poured ink down her back. Brodrick simply laughed their tricks off and eventually became great friends with them.

== Career ==
Back in England, Brodrick entered College Hall, London in 1888 where she studied at University College London under Stuart Poole (co-founder with Amelia Edwards of the Egypt Exploration Society) and the British Museum's Keeper of Egyptian Antiquities Peter le Page Renouf. She did not enter for a University of London degree due to her prior studies. She lectured at the British Museum on Saturdays, charging 21 shillings for a series of lectures titled 'Ancient Egyptian History and Antiquities'. The lectures were open to both men and women.

She was a member of the Committee of Philology and Literary Archaeology of the World's Columbian Exposition in Chicago 1893 and did work in America for the Egyptian Exploration Fund, later being named their American Branch Honorary Secretary. She also became a member of the American Geographical Society. She was awarded the degree of Doctor of Philosophy in 1893 by the College of the Sisters of Bethany, University of Kansas, the same institution that had also awarded a PhD to Amelia Edwards.

Brodrick then studied Egyptology under Flinders Petrie in 1893–94 and 1894–95. She held the Pfeiffer Fellowship of College Hall from 1894 to 1896. In 1896, she was elected a life member of the Bibliothèque nationale, Paris, and a life member of College Hall, London.

From the mid 1890s, Brodrick spent most of her time outside England. She travelled to Italy, Greece and Egypt. She worked under Maspero in Egypt from 1897 to 1908. She was one of the first female excavators in that country and had an interest in women’s experiences in the ancient world. In Egypt she had her head shaved for reason of hygiene. Alongside her friend and fellow Egyptologist Anna Anderson Morton she began leading paid tours for parties of women in Egypt.

Brodrick became part of the British establishment in Egypt and knew Lord Cromer and Kitchener. She took a signed portrait of Queen Victoria to a Bedouin sheikh who had been of assistance to the British. In 1913–14, she "took the salute" at Khartoum during the Gordon Memorial Service. She was also a member of the British Society in Egypt, the Egypt Exploration Society, the Society for the Preservation of the Monuments of Ancient Egypt and the Society of Biblical Archaeology.

In 1913, Brodrick was appointed a Lady of Grace of the Most Venerable Order of the Hospital of Saint John of Jerusalem. She was elected a member (later fellow) of the Royal Geographical Society in 1916. The Mary Brodrick Prize for Geography was given by University College, London.

== Writing ==
Brodrick edited a new edition of Heinrich Brugsch-Bey's Egypt under the Pharaohs in 1891, with sections on recent excavations were added by her to reflect ‘the most recent discoveries in Egyptological science’ and bring the publication up to date. In 1892 she translated and edited Auguste Mariette's Aperçu de l'histoire ancienne d'Egypte which was published by Scribner's in New York, 1892, as Outlines of Ancient Egyptian History.

She took on the editorship of the 9th and 10th editions of Murray's travel Handbooks for Egypt (1896 and 1900) and also edited Murray's Syria and Palestine volume.

A selection of her papers and lectures on Egypt, edited by Eversley Robinson, were published posthumously in 1937.

== Death ==
Brodrick died on 13 July 1933 in Hindhead, Surrey. Her funeral was at St. Alban's Church in that town. As far as is known, Brodrick never married and left no descendants. Years in Egypt had taken their toll and she was not in robust health in her later years. In the year of her death she gave two addresses to College Hall, titled "Retrospect and Prospect" and "Farewell and All Hail".

Brodrick left a net estate of £46168. She gave £500 to her friend Thyra Alleyne, principal of College Hall, and the same amount to Lucie Dobson, bursar of the hall. She left £500 each to Cornelia Cracknell and Florence Collins of The School of Gardening, Clapham, Worthing. On her brother's Cecil's death, she left the portrait of her by Norah Fulcher to College Hall; it is now in a private collection. After some minor legacies of chattels and possessions, the residue of her estate was left two-thirds on trust to her brother and one-third to Mrs (later Dame) Eversley Chaning Robinson, her friend and executrix, and then on to College Hall. It was that, not inconsiderable, residue that provided the funds necessary to allow the completion of the long-planned extension to College Hall in 1934 which was named The Mary Brodrick Wing in her honour. Her personal collection of antiquities have found their way to the Petrie Museum and her academic books to the Edwards Library.

== Selected publications ==
- Brugsch-Bey, Heinrich. Egypt under the Pharaohs: A history derived entirely from the monuments. John Murray, 1891. (Editor)
- Mariette, Auguste. Outlines of Ancient Egyptian History. Scribner's, New York, 1892. (Translator and editor)
- "The Tomb of Pepu ankh (khua), near Sharona". PSBA, 21 (1899), pp. 26–33. (With Anna Anderson Morton)
- The Life and Confession of Asenath, The Daughter of Pentephres of Heliopolis Narrating How The All-Beautiful Joseph Took Her To Wife. P. Wellby, London, 1900. (With Peter Le Page Renouf)
- A Handbook for Travellers in Lower and Upper Egypt, including descriptions of the course of the Nile through Egypt and Nubia, Alexandria, Cairo, the Pyramids, Thebes, the First and Second Cataracts to Khartûm, the Suez Canal, the Peninsula of Mount Sinai, the Oases, the Fayyûm, etc.. 9th edition. John Murray, London, 1896. (Editor) (also 10th edition, 1900)
- A Concise Dictionary of Egyptian Archaeology: A handbook for students and travellers. Methuen, London, 1902. (With Anna Anderson Morton)
- A Handbook for Travellers in Syria and Palestine, including a short account of the geography, history, and religious and political divisions of these countries, together with detailed descriptions of Jerusalem, Damascus, Palmyra, Baalbek, and the interesting ruined cities of Moab, Gilead, and Bashan. Revised edition. Edward Stanford, London, 1903. (Editor)
- The Trial and Crucifixion of Jesus Christ of Nazareth. John Murray, London, 1908.
- Egypt: Papers and Lectures by the Late Mary Brodrick. De La More Press, London, 1937. (Selected and edited by Eversley Robinson)
