= Sarah Frances Alleyne =

British writer and women's education promoter

- Born: 15 October 1836; Barbados
- Died: 16 August 1884 (aged 47); London, England
- Occupation(s): Poet, translator, promoter of women's education
- Organization: Clifton Association for the Higher Education of Women
- Relatives: Leonora Blanche Alleyne (sister)

Sarah Frances Alleyne (15 October 1836 – 16 August 1884) was a British promoter of women's education, poet, and translator.

== Life ==
Alleyne was born in Barbados on 15 October 1836, the daughter of Charles Thomas Alleyne and Margaret Frances Bruce. Her younger sister was Leonora Blanche Alleyne. Charles Alleyne was a plantation owner in Barbados, and the family's substantial wealth was built on the labour of enslaved people.

In Bristol, Alleyne became known for her promotion of women's higher education. She was a member and joint secretary of the Clifton Association for the Higher Education of Women, which organized lectures for women. Through the Association, she became acquainted with one of its lecturers, John Addington Symonds. Alleyne was also on the council of Clifton High School, and secretary to the Oxford local examinations at Clifton.

When Charles Thomas Alleyne died in 1872, she remained in the family home in Clifton, supported by a private income. Alleyne then undertook a series of translations of works by German philosopher Eduard Zeller. These included: Plato and the Older Academy (1876; with Alfred Goodwin), Pre-Socratic Philosophy (1881); and Eclectics (1883).

== Death and legacy ==
At the end of a month's illness, Alleyne died in London on 16 August 1884. She was buried at Clifton.

Alleyne had been in the process of translating Zeller's Outlines of the History of Greek Philosophy, which was completed by classical scholar Evelyn Abbott. In an admiring preface, Abbott wrote that Alleyne had died "in the prime of life, and in the fall vigour of her powers". She wrote:

The excellence of her work has received universal recognition. It was a labour of love. The theories of the Greek Philosophers, and their efforts to conceive the world in which they lived, had a deep interest for her. An inward sympathy with them gave her an insight into the meaning of speculations which by many are deemed idle vagaries. To her they were steps or stages in the progress of the human mind, not merely words or opinions... But though her literary powers were of an uncommon order, to those who were personally acquainted with her they form only a small part of her claim to remembrance. For she united with rare intellectual gifts a truly noble and womanly character. She was one of those who live for others, themselves not caring to be known. There are many by whom her writings would not have been understood who cherish her memory as a great possession, and feel that they have lost a friend never to be replaced.

The Athenaeum wrote:

Ir seems hardly right to allow Miss Sarah Frances Alleyne to pass away without a few words of recognition. Few were ever brought in contact with her without feeling that there was in her a latent power which raised her above the ordinary type of womanhood, though womanly in every thought and kindly deed. Her intellectual gifts were certainly of a high order, and her achievements in literature, as the translator of Zeller’s works from the German, attracted the notice of several distinguished scholars... Nothing she ever did was superficial. Thoroughness in all she undertook was amongst her leading characteristics.
