= Leonora Blanche Lang =

English author, editor, and translator (1851-1933)

- Born: Leonora Blanche Alleyne; 8 March 1851; Clifton, Bristol, England
- Died: 10 July 1933 (aged 82); Kensington, London, England
- Spouse: Andrew Lang (m. 1875; died 1912)
- Relatives: Henry Bruce, 1st Baron Aberdare (uncle); James Knight-Bruce (uncle); Robert Bruce (uncle); Thyra Alleyne (niece)

Leonora Blanche "Nora" Lang (née Alleyne; 8 March 1851 – 10 July 1933) was an English writer, editor, and translator. She is best known as variously the translator, collaborator and writer of The Fairy Books, a series of 25 collections of folk and fairy tales for children she published with her husband, Andrew Lang, between 1889 and 1913. The best known of these are the Rainbow Fairy Books, a series of twelve collections of fairy tales each assigned a different colour.

== Early life and education ==
Lang was born Leonora Blanche Alleyne on 8 March 1851 in Clifton, Bristol to Charles Thomas Alleyne (1798–1872), a plantation owner and former slaveholder in Barbados, and Margaret Frances (née Bruce; 1811–1864). Alleyne was the maternal niece of the politicians Henry Bruce, 1st Baron Aberdare and James Knight-Bruce, and the British Army officer Robert Bruce. The seventh of eight children, Alleyne the younger sister of the translator and promoter of women's education Sarah Frances Alleyne.

She described a "sternly repressed childhood" dictated by her much older parents. She received a "usual desultory education as a day girl at a fashionable school of the period in Clifton" before she met her husband, Scots writer Andrew Lang. She married Andrew Lang on 13 April 1875, in Christ Church, Clifton. Lang had to leave his fellowship at Merton College, Oxford in order to marry her, as the college's quota of tutors given leave to marry had already been filled. After marrying, they lived and worked in Kensington, London.

The young couple quickly joined literary and artistic social circles in London and Edinburgh. Among their lifelong friends were the Earl and Countess of Strathmore and Kinghorne, the parents of Lady Elizabeth Bowes-Lyon, mother of the future Queen Elizabeth II. Years later, Elizabeth, Duchess of York granted Alleyne permission to dedicate a reprint of Andrew Lang's The Chronicles of Pantouflia to the young Princess Elizabeth.

== The Fairy Books ==
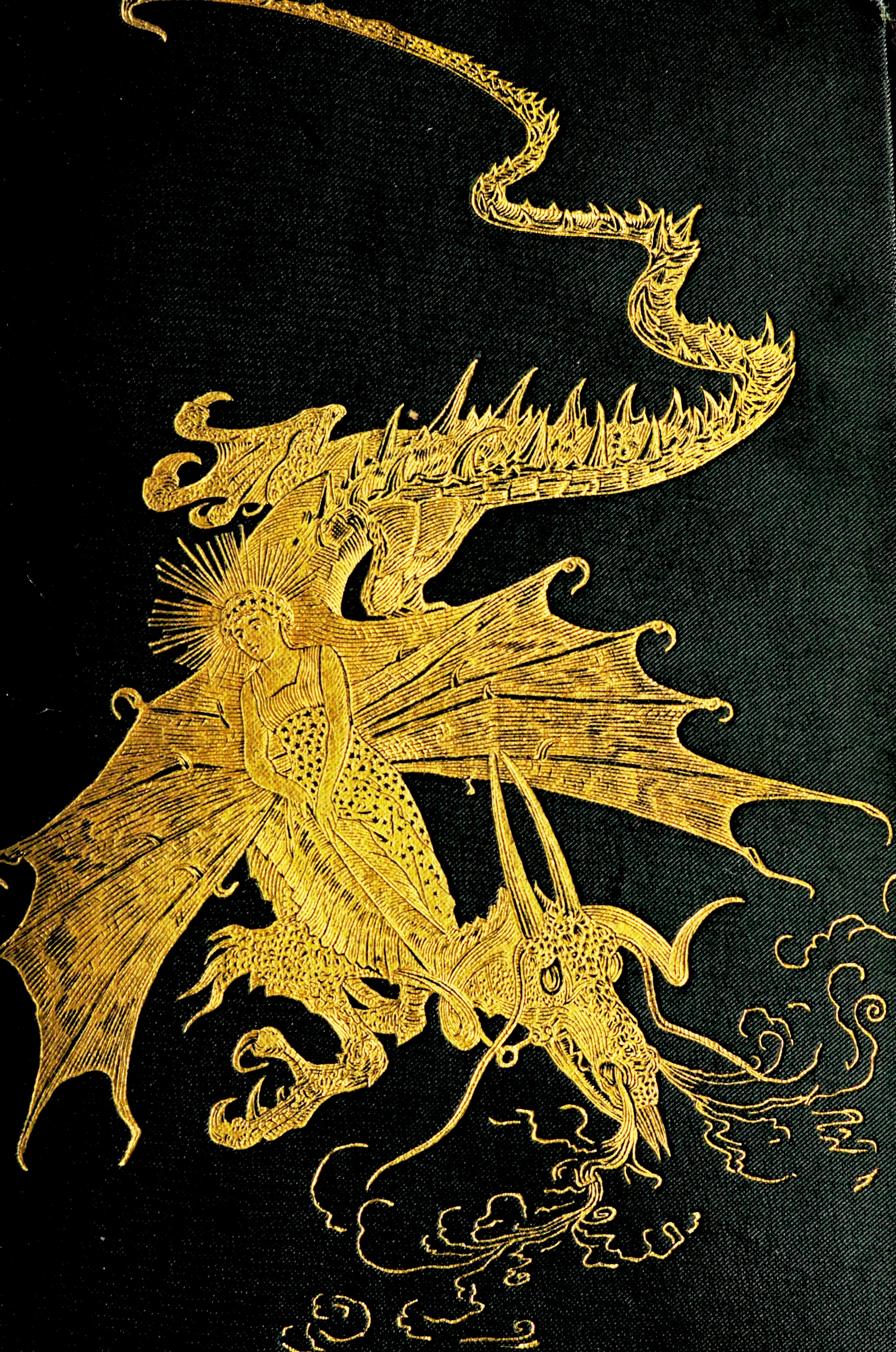
The Green Fairy Book (1902)

The authorship and translation of the Coloured Fairy Books is often and incorrectly attributed to Lang's husband alone. According to literary critic Anita Silvey, "The irony of [Andrew] Lang's life and work is that although he wrote for a profession — literary criticism; fiction; poems; books and articles on anthropology, mythology, history, and travel [...] he is best recognized for the works he did not write." Nora is not named on the front cover or spines of any of the Coloured Fairy Books, which all give Andrew as their editor. However, as Andrew acknowledges in a preface to The Lilac Fairy Book (1910), "The fairy books have been almost wholly the work of Mrs. Lang, who has translated and adapted them from the French, German, Portuguese, Italian, Spanish, Catalan, and other languages." Andrew is quoted as saying "[M]y part has been that of Adam ... in the Garden of Eden. Eve worked, Adam superintended".

Although Andrew is often credited with selecting the stories in the Fairy Books, most of the work was done by Nora. Nora and a team of other writers, who were mostly women and included May Kendall and Violet Hunt, translated these into English and adapted them to suit Victorian and Edwardian notions of propriety. Nora's collaboration is first credited in The Green Fairy Book, the third in the series, and from this point on she writes most of the retellings, usually credited as "Mrs. Lang". Further volumes of stories published from 1908 to 1912 are credited as written by "Mrs. Lang", such as The Red Book of Heroes (1909) and The Book of Saints and Heroes (1912).

Originally, the Langs only intended to publish one collection of fairy stories (the first was The Blue Fairy Book, published in 1889), but the popularity of each subsequent volume led to another. Critics and educational researches of the day had previously judged fairy tales' "unreality, brutality, and escapism to be harmful for young readers, while holding that such stories were beneath the serious consideration of those of mature age". The Langs' collections did much to shift this public perception of fairy stories as unsuitable for children and unworthy of critical analysis.

== Influence ==
The books have also influenced generations of writers since. Other children's authors, including E. Nesbit, Robert Louis Stevenson, Rudyard Kipling, and Arthur Conan Doyle, were influenced by the Langs' books. J. R. R. Tolkien wrote that "In English none probably rival either the popularity, or the inclusiveness, or the general merits of the twelve books of twelve colours which we owe to Andrew Lang and to his wife."

Booker prize-winning novelist Margaret Atwood, whose work often reinvents and re-imagines fairy stories, "recollects reading Lang with wonder at the age of ten".

== Other works ==
Lang's other works include a history of Russia translated from the French of Alfred Rambaud (1879) and a novel, Dissolving Views, published in 1884. She was also a frequent reviewer for periodicals such as the Saturday Review and the Academy.

== Later life ==
Following her husband's death in 1912, Lang moved to a flat in Cheniston Gardens. She mastered Russian, which she used to communicate with Russian soldiers in British hospitals and camps after the First World War and Russian Revolution.

Lang died on 10 July 1933, in Kensington, leaving the family fortune to her niece, Thyra Blanche Alleyne, daughter of her brother Forster McGeachy Alleyne.
