= Ada Barnett =

British novelist

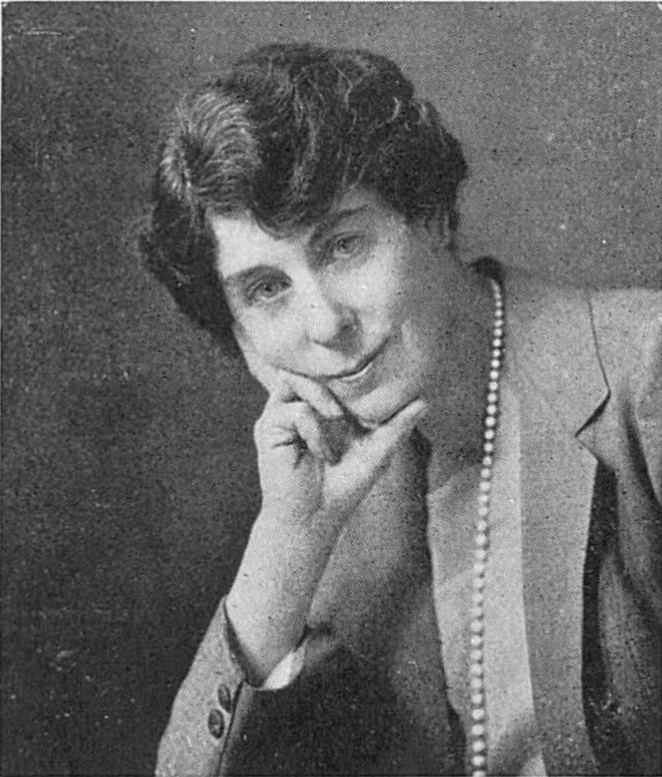
- Born: 1864; Tooting
- Died: 11 April 1953 (aged 88–89); Sunbury-on-Thames
- Awards: Member of the Order of the British Empire

Ada Barnett MBE (1864 – 11 April 1953) was a British novelist who published under her own name and the pseudonym G. Cardella.

Ada Barnett was born in 1864 in Tooting, one of nine children of Edward Barnett, a gun manufacturer, and Jaquetta Wright Sanders. She spent her early life at the family home of Kenton Court in Sunbury-on-Thames. She never married though she always wore a wedding ring to commemorate her deceased fiancée.

She published four novels in the 1890s. under the name of G. Cardella. In the 1920s, she published three more novels under her own name. The Joyous Adventurer is a fantasy novel about Copper Top, a being who explores humanity as a human and then returns to his higher plane of existence.

She was an anti-vivisectionist campaigner. She was named Member of the Order of the British Empire in 1919 for her work as commandant of the Kingswood Auxiliary Hospital and Rust Hall Auxiliary Hospital.

Ada Barnett died on 11 April 1953 in Sunbury-on-Thames.

== Bibliography ==
- A King's Daughter. 3 vol. London: Swan Sonnenschein, 1892.
- The Perfect Way of Honour. 3 vol. London: Swan Sonnenschein, 1894.
- For the Life of Others: A Novel. 1 vol. London: Swan Sonnenschein, 1897.
- The Adventures of Tod with and without Betty. 1 vol. London: Swan Sonnenschein, 1900.
- The Man on the Other Side. London: Allen and Unwin, 1921.
- The Joyous Adventurer. London: Allen and Unwin, 1923.
- Mary's Son. London: Allen and Unwin, 1927.
