= John Martin (cricketer, born 1867) =

English cricketer

Personal information
- Full name: John Newton Martin
- Born: 3 July 1867; St Austell, Cornwall, England
- Died: 31 August 1942 (aged 75); Torquay, Devon, England
- Batting: Unknown
- Bowling: Unknown

Domestic team information
- Years: Team
- 1891: Marylebone Cricket Club
- 1901–1903: Devon

Career statistics
Competition	First-class
Matches	1
Runs scored	30
Batting average	30.00
100s/50s	–/–
Top score	29*
Catches/stumpings	–/–
- Source: Cricinfo, 7 February 2011

John Newton Martin MBE (3 July 1867 – 31 August 1942) was an English first-class cricketer.

The son of W. L. Martin, he was born in July 1867 at St Austell, Cornwall. Martin had played second-class county cricket for teams representative of Devon since 1888. In 1891, he made a single appearance in first-class cricket for the Marylebone Cricket Club (MCC) against Somerset at Taunton. Batting twice in the match, he was dismissed for a single run in the MCC first innings by Ted Tyler, while following-on in their second innings, he remained unbeaten on 29. Ten years later, he captained Devon County Cricket Club in their inaugural Minor Counties Championship match against Glamorgan; in doing so, he became Devon's first captain in minor counties cricket. He played minor counties cricket for Devon until 1903, making twelve appearances.

Martin's profession was recorded as being a surgeon. He served in the First World War in the Royal Army Medical Corps, serving with the rank of lieutenant in May 1915. He was made a temporary captain in May 1916. Following the war, he was made an MBE in the 1919 New Year Honours, having relinquished his commission in November 1918, at which point he retained the rank of captain. Martin died in Torquay, Devon on 31 August 1942.
