= H. J. Gough =

British engineer and research director

H. J. Gough CB MBE FRS
- Born: Herbert John Gough; 26 April 1890; Bermondsey, London, England
- Died: 1 June 1965 (aged 75); Brighton, Sussex, England
- Education: University of London
- Awards: Fellow of the Royal Society
- Scientific career
- Workplaces: Unilever

Herbert John Gough (26 April 1890 – 1 June 1965) was a British engineer and a research director. He was noted for his research on metal fatigue and he was the chief engineer at Unilever from 1945–55.

== Early life ==
Herbert Gough was born in Bermondsey, London, in 1890. He attended the technical school at the Regent Street Polytechnic before winning a scholarship to University College School.

In 1909 he became an apprentice at Vickers, Sons, progressing to become a design draughtsman by 1913; he also attended university lectures as part of his development. He duly graduated from the University of London with a BSc, to which he later added a DSc and PhD in engineering.

== Great War ==
On the outbreak of war he joined the Signals branch of the Royal Engineers, being commissioned and serving from 1914 to May 1919. For his service as a signals officer in France and Flanders, he was twice mentioned in dispatches, and was awarded a military MBE in 1919.

== Inter-war ==
Having joined briefly in 1914, Gough returned to work at the National Physical Laboratory, at Teddington, where he remained until 1938. His area of expertise was the study of material fatigue and, in 1933, he was elected a Fellow of the Royal Society (FRS).

== Second World War ==
In 1938, he was appointed Director-General of Scientific Research at the Ministry of Supply. He was promoted to become Deputy Controller-General of all Research and Development at the MoS. His responsibilities included the Telecommunications Research Establishment at Malvern, Porton Down, and for the rocket station at Aberystwyth Port, Cardiganshire.

For his war-service, Gough was made a Companion of the Order of the Bath in 1942, and in 1947 he was decorated with the Medal of Freedom with Silver Palm by the United States.

In 1946, he presented the Thomas Hawksley Lecturer on Unexploded ordnance.

== Post-War ==
After the war, Dr. Gough joined Unilever as Engineer-in-Chief; he retired in 1955.

He was President of the IMechE in 1949.

Dr. Herbert Gough CB, MBE, FRS died in 1965.

== Works ==
- The fatigue of metals: with numerous diagrams and tables, Scott, Greenwood & Son, 1924

Professional and academic associations
Preceded by E. William Gregson	President of the Institution of Mechanical Engineers; 1949	Succeeded by Stanley Fabes Dorey
