= Arthur Mayo-Robson =

British surgeon (1853–1933)

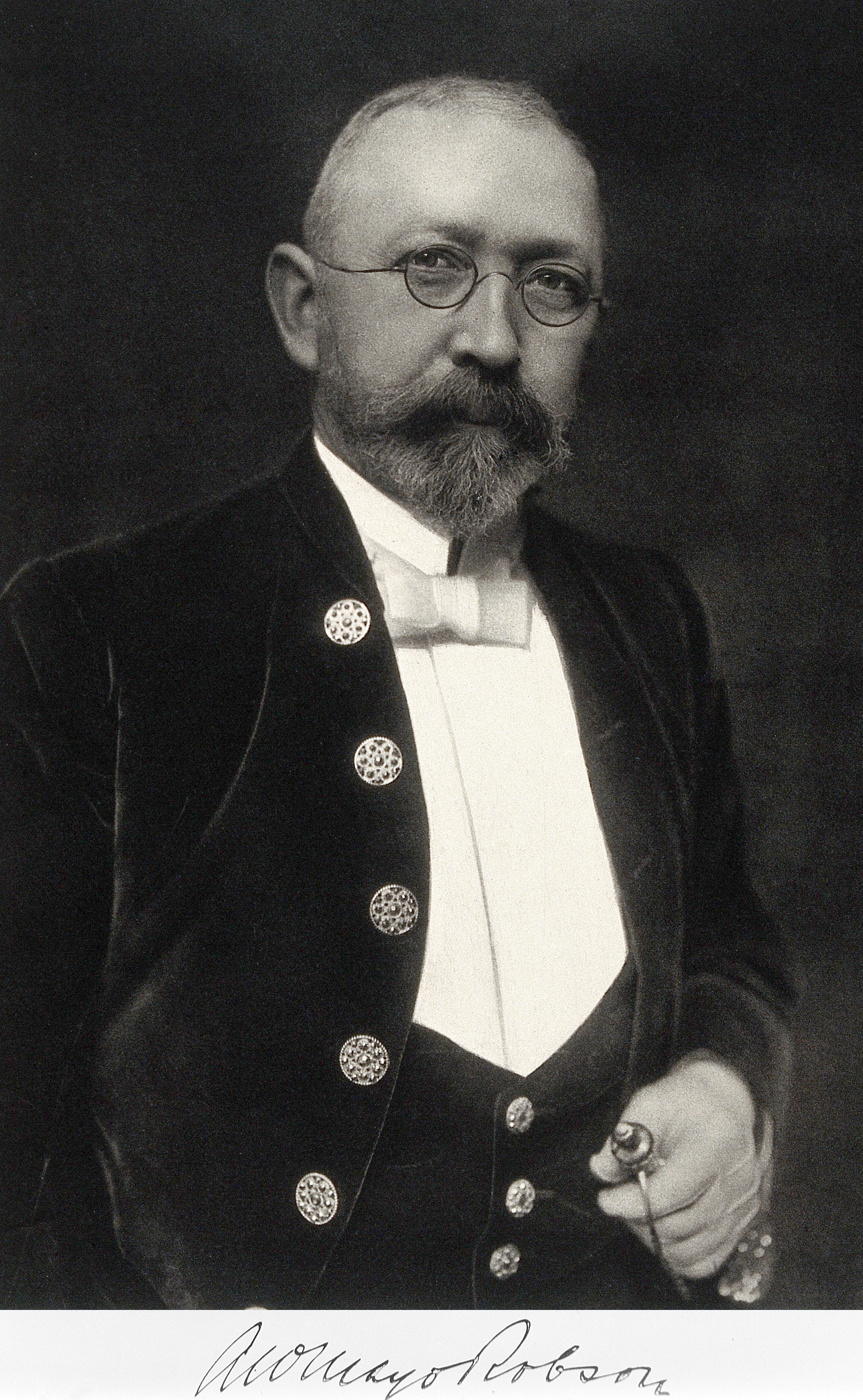
Arthur Mayo-Robson

Sir Arthur William Mayo-Robson KBE CB CVO FRCS (17 April 1853 in Filey, Yorkshire – 12 October 1933 in London), also written as Mayo Robson, was an English surgeon. He was president of the British Gynaecological Society.

== Biography ==
Arthur William Robson was born in Filey as the son of John Bonnington Robson, a chemist. He added Mayo to his surname later, as an adult. He attended Wesley College in Sheffield and then Leeds School of Medicine (1870). In 1874 he was accepted as Member of the Royal College of Surgeons (MRCS). In 1876 he started lecturing at Leeds, and in 1884 became a surgeon with the General Infirmary. From 1890 to 1899 he held a position of Professor of Surgery at Yorkshire College of the Victoria University, the predecessor of the University of Leeds. In 1902 he resigned from his positions at Leeds and moved to London. He became a Commander of the Royal Victorian Order in 1911.

During World War I Mayo-Robson served in France, Turkey and Egypt, reaching the rank of Colonel with the Army Medical Service. He became a Companion of the Order of the Bath in 1916, knighted in 1918, and made a Knight Commander of the Order of the British Empire in 1919. After returning from Egypt, he settled in Seale, Surrey.

In 1883 Mayo-Robson married Florence, a daughter of William Walker from Leeds, and had three daughters with her. He remarried in 1932, after the death of his first wife in 1930.

== Work ==
Mayo-Robson wrote several books:

- On gallstones and their treatment (1892)
- Diseases of the gall bladder and bild duct (1897)
- Gall-stones, their complications and treatment (1909)
- Diseases of the stomach and their surgical treatment (1901)
- Diseases of the pancreas and their surgical treatment (1902)
- The pancreas, its surgery and pathology (1907)
- Cancer of the stomach (1907).

He was a pioneer in biliary surgery and orthopaedics. Two anatomic terms carry his name: the Mayo-Robson point and Mayo-Robson's position.

== Bibliography ==
- "SIR Arthur Mayo-Robson". Annals of the Royal College of Surgeons of England. 11 (5): 330–2. 1952. PMC 2377568. PMID 12986638.
- "Sir Arthur Mayo-Robson, K.b.e., C.b". British Medical Journal. 2 (3798): 761–2. 1933. doi:10.1136/bmj.2.3798.761. PMC 2369480. PMID 20777842.
- Arthur Mayo Robson, KBE, CB, CVO, KB, MRCS Eng, FRCS Eng, Hon. DSc Leeds (1853–1933). leeds.ac.uk
