= Émile Antoine Verpilleux =

Anglo-Belgian artist (1888–1964)

- Born: 3 March 1888; London, United Kingdom
- Died: 10 September 1964; Bermuda

Émile Antoine Verpilleux MBE (3 March 1888 – 10 September 1964) was an Anglo-Belgian artist who specialised in woodcut printmaking. He was the first artist to have hung a coloured print work at the Royal Academy.

Born in Notting Hill, London, to a Belgian father (also called Émile Antoine Verpilleux) and a Scottish mother (Edith Verpilleux, née Beard), he was educated in France for two years at the age of 10, but was otherwise brought up in England. He began his art education at the Regent Street Polytechnic and then at the age of 18, moved to the Antwerp Académie des Beaux Arts. He returned to the UK after three years and worked as an occasional illustrator for monthly magazines. A commission to illustrate the book The Charm of Beautiful Nonsense, by E Temple Thurston, resulted in more illustration work and gave Verpilleux the financial freedom to spend time developing his woodcut printing techniques.

His work, including multi-coloured woodcuts such as St Paul's From Cheapside and St Pancras Railway Station, was taken up by the publishers Colnaghi & Co who helped to popularise his distinctive style in the run up to, and following, the First World War.

He served with the rank of Captain in the Royal Air Force in the First World War, was mentioned in despatches and was appointed a Member of the Order of the British Empire in the 1919 New Year Honours. Several of his works are in the Royal Air Force Museum.

Later in his life, he moved to Bermuda, living there until his death. A series of murals Verpilleux painted of 1930s Bermuda that were on display in St. George's Town Hall have been restored after being damaged by Hurricane Fabian.
