= Deaths in October 1977 =

The following is a list of notable deaths in October 1977. Entries for each day are listed alphabetically by surname. A typical entry lists information in the following sequence:

- Name, age, country of citizenship at birth, subsequent country of citizenship (if applicable), reason for notability, cause of death (if known), and reference.

== October 1977 ==
=== 1 ===
- Mary Breen, 44, Australian Olympic shot putter (1956).
- William J. Coyle, 89, American politician and football player, lieutenant governor of Washington (1921–1925).
- Joaquim Ferreira Bogalho, 87, Portuguese football executive.
- Rudi Graetz, 70, German translator and Esperantist.
- Robert Luthardt, 60, American art director (The Fortune Cookie), traffic collision.
- George W. Milias, 52, American politician, member of the California State Assembly (1963–1971).
- Vincent Mulchrone, 54, English journalist, leukemia.
- Pat Patterson, 80, American baseball player.
- Martin Walter Stanton, 80, American Roman Catholic prelate.
- Hellmut W. Stolle, 72, German-born American politician, member of the Illinois House of Representatives (1963–1965, 1967–1971).
- Anne Stratton, 90, American composer.
- František Zíta, 67, Czech chess player.

=== 2 ===
- Carl Bergenstråhle, 67, Swedish diplomat.
- Tommy Farnan, 63, Irish-born New Zealand footballer.
- Walt Farrant, 65, Canadian ice hockey player.
- Odd Frantzen, 64, Norwegian footballer.
- Gyula Futó, 68, Hungarian footballer.
- S. Floyd Landreth, 92, American politician, member of the Virginia Senate (1944–1964).
- Ned Nelson, 66, American baseball and basketball player.
- Arnold Perry, 78, New Zealand rugby player.
- Beniamino Segre, 74, Italian mathematician.
- Joseph William Woodrough, 104, American jurist.

=== 3 ===
- Arnold Bode, 76, German architect and artist.
- Ian Fallis, 23, Scottish footballer, traffic collision.
- Tay Garnett, 83, American film director (The Postman Always Rings Twice, A Connecticut Yankee in King Arthur's Court, China Seas), leukemia.
- Rosie Jimenez, 27, American woman, complications from an unsafe abortion.
- Sir Herbert McVeigh, 68, Northern Irish jurist.
- Letitia Overend, 97, Irish philanthropist and filmmaker.
- Richard Peter, 82, German photographer and journalist.
- Marion Sénones, 91, French artist.
- Mihály Szemes, 57, Hungarian filmmaker.
- Koney Williams, 57, American baseball player.

=== 4 ===
- Peter Blachstein, 66, German politician, diplomat and journalist.
- Malcolm Davis, 77–78, American ornithologist, heart attack.
- Giosuè Fiorentino, 78, Italian politician.
- José Ber Gelbard, 60, Polish-born Argentine politician, heart attack.
- Aleksander Hendrikson, 81, Soviet Estonian politician.
- Arturo Jáuregui, 57, Peruvian trade unionist.
- George Jensen, 99, American artist.
- Floyd Lagercrantz, 62, Swedish footballer.
- Raphael Mahler, 78, Austrian-Israeli historian.
- Burley E. Parke, 72, American jockey, heart attack.
- Del Porter, 75, American jazz musician.
- Ippolito Rotoli, 63, Italian Roman Catholic prelate.
- Xu Jianguo, 74, Chinese politician and diplomat.

=== 5 ===
- Seamus Costello, 38, Irish politician and paramilitary leader, shot.
- Clodualdo del Mundo Sr., 66, Filipino novelist and playwright.
- Webley Edwards, 74, American news correspondent and politician, heart attack.
- Fred F. Finklehoffe, 67, American filmmaker.
- Jan Garber, 82, American bandleader and violinist.
- Mabel Hardy, 87, Australian educator.
- Jan Jagmin-Sadowski, 82, Polish general.
- Oskar Lindberg, 83, Swedish Olympic skier (1924).
- Rohan Rivett, 60, Australian journalist, heart attack.
- Payson Sherman, 88, Canadian politician.
- Eugenio Giuseppe Togliatti, 86, Italian mathematician.
- Alfred Tooming, 70, Estonian Lutheran prelate.
- Yoshie Wada, 71, Japanese novelist.
- Ray Wolfe, 72, American politician, mayor of Anchorage, Alaska (1944–1945).

=== 6 ===
- Gene Bedford, 80, American baseball player.
- Albert Gittins, 80, English cricketer.
- Danny Greene, 43, American mobster, car bombing.
- Mort Hill, 54, American basketball player.
- Hayrullah Örs, 75–76, Turkish educator, writer and musician.
- Rudolf Reder, 96, Austrian-born Polish Holocaust survivor.
- Anton Schütz, 83, German-American artist.
- Jotie T'Hooft, 21, Belgian poet, suicide by cocaine overdose.
- Molly Urquhart, 71, Scottish actress.
- Tany Youne, 74, Soviet actress and writer.

=== 7 ===
- Douglas De Ruymbeke, 83, American-born Belgian footballer.
- Lady Alice Egerton, 54, English socialite and courtier, suicide by asphyxiation.
- Frances Moran, 83, Irish legal scholar and barrister.
- Paul O'Loughlin, 67, Australian actor and stage director.
- Fred Paterson, 80, Australian politician.
- Milo Rowell, 74, American lawyer and soldier.
- Håkon Stenstadvold, 65, Norwegian artist and politician.
- Alice Woodhouse, 93, New Zealand journalist and broadcaster.

=== 8 ===
- Uno Åhrén, 80, Swedish architect and urban planner.
- Wally Colliss, 69, Australian footballer.
- Clarence Drayer, 76, American football player and politician.
- Alexey Dushkin, 72, Soviet architect.
- Joe Greenstein, 84, Polish-American strongman, cancer.
- Wilfred Heywood, 77, British trade unionist.
- Wanda Leopold, 56, Polish writer and activist.
- Pál Medgyessy, 57, Hungarian mathematician.
- Clarence Miles, 80, American baseball executive.
- Benedito Moreira de Carvalho, 68, Brazilian convicted serial killer.
- Marty Norton, c. 73, American football player and convicted fraudster.
- Giorgos Papasideris, 75, Greek musician.
- Chuck Radley, 52, Canadian football player.
- Lyall Stuart Scott, 57, Scottish urologist and surgeon.
- Jerzy Werner, 68, Polish politician and educator.
- Ludwik Zabrocki, 69, Polish linguist.

=== 9 ===
- Ruth Elder, 75, American aviator and actress.
- Fred Long, 81, Australian footballer.
- Zdzisław Maklakiewicz, 50, Polish actor, injuries sustained from blunt force trauma.
- Anton Moortgat, 80, Belgian archaeologist.
- Placide Tempels, 71, Belgian missionary and writer (Bantu Philosophy).
- Stephen W. Thompson, 83, American fighter pilot.

=== 10 ===
- Mohd Hamdan Abdullah, 55, Malaysian politician, heart failure.
- Bengt Bengtsson, 80, Swedish Olympic gymnast (1920).
- Laurence E. Bunker, 75, American soldier and military aide, cancer.
- Jean Duvieusart, 77, Belgian politician, prime minister (1950).
- José Fioravanti, 81, Argentine sculptor.
- Helen Gibson, 85, American actress and stuntwoman, heart failure.
- Lea Grundig, 71, German artist.
- Ivan Lavsky, 58, Soviet artist.
- Jim Lyle, 77, American baseball player.
- D'Arcy McNickle, 73, American novelist (The Surrounded) and anthropologist, heart attack.
- Heinrich Meyer, 73, German-American educator and writer.
- Angelo Muscat, 47, Maltese-born British actor (The Prisoner, Willy Wonka & the Chocolate Factory), pneumonia.
- John O'Connor, 83, Irish Olympic triple jumper (1924).
- İsmail Hakkı Okday, 95, Turkish general and damat.
- Ture Rosvall, 86, Swedish Olympic rower (1912).
- Lewis Thorpe, 63, British linguist and translator.
- İsmail Hakkı Uzunçarşılı, 89, Turkish historian and politician.
- Johnny Wiggs, 78, American jazz musician and bandleader.

=== 11 ===
- Ibrahim al-Hamdi, 34, North Yemeni politician, president (since 1974), assassinated.
- Beatriz Allende, 35, Chilean politician and surgeon, suicide by gunshot.
- Jozef Benedik, 79, Czechoslovak Olympic fencer (1936).
- Misha Black, 66, Russian-born British architect.
- Christiaan Both, 82, Dutch Olympic sports shooter (1936, 1948).
- Mason Welch Gross, 66, American academic administrator and television personality.
- Fred Hendershot, 82, American football player and coach.
- MacKinlay Kantor, 73, American journalist and novelist (Andersonville), heart attack.
- John Lee, 62, American blues musician.
- Queenie Thomas, 79, British actress.
- Joseph Wheeler, 49–50, British musicologist.
- Hobb Wilson, 73, Canadian ice hockey player.

=== 12 ===
- Germaine Bailac, 96, French opera singer and teacher.
- Juan Carlos Calvo, 71, Uruguayan footballer.
- Chen Wangdao, 86, Chinese academic administrator and translator.
- Blanche Cornwall, 91, American actress.
- Dorothy Davenport, 82, American actress and filmmaker.
- Sir Leonard Ropner, 82, British politician, MP (1923–1929, 1931–1964).
- Francis Thomas, 65, English-born Singaporean politician, cancer.
- Jan Zrzavý, 86, Czech artist.

=== 13 ===
- István Avar, 72, Hungarian football player and manager.
- Charles H. Bonesteel III, 68, American general.
- Joe Bratcher, 79, American baseball player.
- Shirley Brickey, 32, American singer (The Orlons), shot.
- Walter Bunning, 65, Australian architect and urban planner, brain cancer.
- Jackie Condon, 59, American actor (Our Gang), colon cancer.
- Jack McConaghy, 74, American set decorator.
- Fernandus Payne, 96, American geneticist and zoologist.
- Gladys Spencer-Churchill, Duchess of Marlborough, 96, American-English socialite and aristocrat.

=== 14 ===
- Bing Crosby, 74, American singer ("White Christmas") and actor (Road to ..., Going My Way), heart attack.
- James Denby, 85, English footballer.
- Sir Hugh Ennor, 65, Australian public servant.
- Jacob Jacobs, 87, Hungarian-born American theater director and lyricist ("Bei Mir Bistu Shein").
- Onni Rantasalo, 94, Finnish politician.
- Francis Ryan, 69, American soccer player.
- Davie Shaw, 60, Scottish football player and coach.
- Kathryn Grove Shipp, 73, American chemist, heart attack.
- Teo Snellman, 83, Finnish politician and author.
- Frank Stubblefield, 70, American politician, member of the U.S. House of Representatives (1959–1974), lung disease.
- Gilbert White, 65, English cricketer and soldier.
- Sir Maurice Willmott, 83, British jurist.

=== 15 ===
- Farida Arriany, 38, Indonesian actress and singer, cirrhosis.
- Florence Broadhurst, 78, Australian artist, blunt force trauma.
- Tadao Harumura, 76, Japanese painter.
- Jayanta Hazarika, 34, Indian singer and composer.
- A.T. Markose, 57, Indian jurist.
- Arthur Morris, 79, British Anglican prelate.
- V. K. Govindan Nair, 74, Indian poet.
- May Romm, 85, Russian-born American psychiatrist and psychoanalyst.
- Birger Rosengren, 59, Swedish footballer.
- Ralph Truman, 77, English actor.
- Símun Petur Zachariasen, 89, Faroese politician.

=== 16 ===
- Geoffrey Charles Bratt, 46, Australian chemist and lichenologist
- Margaret de Crussol d'Uzès, 44, American socialite and oil heiress, traffic collision.
- Hal Lee, 67, American basketball player.
- Percy May, 50, British Olympic gymnast (1948).
- J. Roscoe Miller, 71, American academic administrator.
- Milt Raskin, 61, American jazz pianist.
- Ted Russell, 73, Canadian politician.
- Jürgen Schumann, 37, German pilot, shot.
- J. Leo Sullivan, 81, American politician
- Dean P. Taylor, 75, American politician, member of the U.S. House of Representatives (1943–1961).
- Vic Trood, 85, Australian footballer.
- Paddy Whyte, 83, Australian politician.

=== 17 ===
- Sir Michael Balcon, 81, English film producer.
- Yusuf Banuri, 69, Pakistani Islamic scholar.
- J. Floyd Breeding, 76, American politician, member of the U.S. House of Representatives (1957–1963).
- Renate Chasman, 45, German-born American physicist, melanoma.
- Ivan Fedyuninsky, 77, Soviet general.
- C. T. Fernando, 56, Sri Lankan singer and composer, heart attack.
- Cal Hubbard, 76, American football player and baseball umpire, cancer.
- George Perry Johnson, 91, American film producer.
- John Murphy, 65, American sanitorium operator and professional wrestler.
- Allan M. Ohata, 59, American soldier, Medal of Honor recipient.
- Sir Lindsay Tasman Ride, 79, Australian academic administrator and physiologist.
- Ettore Rivolta, 73, Italian Olympic racewalker (1932, 1936).
- Ángel Roldán, 62, Mexican Olympic fencer (1960).
- Joel I. Seidman, 70–71, American economist and writer.
- Sir John Tarbat, 86, Scottish-Sri Lankan businessman and politician.
- Dave Ziff, 75, American football player.

=== 18 ===
- Andreas Baader, 34, German left-wing militant (Red Army Faction), suicide by gunshot.
- John Cliff, 94, English trade unionist.
- Robert T. Curran, 56, American baseball and basketball coach.
- Godfrey Dewey, 90, American Olympic ski team manager and educator.
- Gudrun Ensslin, 37, German left-wing militant (Red Army Faction), suicide by hanging.
- Rolph Grant, 67, Trinidadian cricketer.
- Kristian Hauger, 71, Norwegian pianist and composer.
- Rudolf Lindau, 89, German politician and historian.
- Jean-François Martial, 86, Belgian actor.
- Jan-Carl Raspe, 33, German left-wing militant (Red Army Faction), suicide by gunshot.
- Ray Ryan, 73, American businessman, car bombing.
- Hanns Martin Schleyer, 62, German business executive and lobbyist, shot.
- Jiří Sekyra, 48, Czech Olympic ice hockey player (1952).
- Merv Smith, 52, Australian footballer.
- Tom Stapleton, 70, Australian footballer.
- Hubert Wiggs, 84, American football player and coach.

=== 19 ===
- Marino Capicchioni, 82, Sammarinese-Italian instrument maker.
- Richard Curzon, 2nd Viscount Scarsdale, 79, British peer, member of the House of Lords (since 1925).
- Dick Frahm, 71, American football player and coach.
- Tom Grandin, 70, American journalist.
- Geoffrey Hope-Morley, 2nd Baron Hollenden, 92, British sheriff and aristocrat.
- Henry Howard, 64, British colonial administrator and journalist.
- Gabriel Juvé, 69, Spanish footballer.
- Maria Antonia of Parma, 81, Austrian-born French royal and nun.
- René Mourlon, 84, French Olympic sprinter (1912, 1920, 1924).
- John Nyman, 69, Swedish Olympic wrestler (1936).

=== 20 ===
- Alberto Cardone, 57, Italian filmmaker.
- Jo Einaar, 81, Surinamese diplomat.
- Arnold Horwitt, 59, American screenwriter and lyricist, cancer.
- Dan Kirkwood, 76, Scottish footballer.
- Clemens Michalski, 75, American politician.
- Logan Morris, 87, American jurist.
- Albert Olsson, 80, Swedish footballer.
- Bill Twine, 79, English golfer.
- Vital Vouardoux, 58, Swiss Olympic skier (1948).
- Marie-Thérèse Walter, 68, French model, suicide by hanging.
- Maria Wiedmaier, 81, German political activist and World War II resistance member.
- Rolf Wuthmann, 84, German general.
- Notable victims of the Lynyrd Skynyrd plane crash:
  - Cassie Gaines, 29, American singer
  - Steve Gaines, 28, American guitarist
  - Ronnie Van Zant, 29, American singer ("Sweet Home Alabama", "Free Bird")

=== 21 ===
- Keith Carmody, 58, Australian cricketer.
- Afanasie Chiriac, 86, Moldovan politician.
- Margaret Fishenden, 88, British meteorologist.
- Sir Norman Gilroy, 81, Australian Roman Catholic cardinal.
- Émilien Lafrance, 66, Canadian politician, canoeing accident.
- Charles Russell, 70, Australian politician, MP (1949–1951), stroke.
- Silvano Schiavon, 34, Italian racing cyclist.
- Ferit Tüzün, 48, Turkish composer.
- Panthea Twitty, 65, American historian and photographer.
- Jan van Tilburg, 77, Dutch politician and colonial administrator, governor of Suriname (1956–1962).

=== 22 ===
- Shwe Pyi Aye, 68, Burmese musician and composer.
- Sir Harold Burrough, 88, British naval admiral, pneumonia.
- Julien Delbecque, 74, Belgian racing cyclist.
- Elwood Geiges, 82, American football player and coach.
- Maria Antonia of Austria, 78, Austrian-Brazilian royal.
- Valerie Allen Marland, 60, American socialite, first lady of West Virginia (1953–1957), house fire.
- Marie-Antoinette Mobutu, 36, Zairian socialite, first lady (since 1965), heart failure.
- Milda Dorothea Prytz, 86, Norwegian chemist.
- Andrew Robertson, 94, British engineer.

=== 23 ===
- Fira Benenson, 79, Russian-American fashion designer.
- Julián de Olivares, 81, Spanish Olympic fencer (1924).
- Victor Hugo Díaz, 50, Argentine harmonica player.
- George Gerken, 74, American baseball player.
- Georges Heuyer, 93, French psychiatrist.
- Mostafa Khomeini, 46, Iranian Shia cleric, heart attack.
- Victor Linart, 88, Belgian racing cyclist.
- George Mardikian, 74, Armenian-American restaurateur.
- Lester Markel, 83, American journalist, cancer.
- Beatrice Nasmyth, 92, Canadian journalist.
- Ludwig Rosenberg, 74, German trade unionist, heart attack.
- E. Millicent Sowerby, 94, English-American bibliographer.
- Hugh Tracey, 74, British ethnomusicologist.
- Marco Wolff, 83, American vaudeville performer.
- Richard Wrottesley, 5th Baron Wrottesley, 59, British hereditary peer.

=== 24 ===
- Giuseppina Masotti Biggiogero, 83, Italian mathematician and historian.
- Manuel Viegas Carrascalão, 76, Portuguese trade unionist and journalist.
- Pearl Dickson, 74, American blues musician.
- James Henry Gorbey, 57, American jurist and politician, cancer.
- George W. Hahn, 83, American orthodontist, complications from a stroke.
- Jozef Horemans, 67, Belgian racing cyclist.
- Bill Lewis, 73, American baseball player.
- Oliver John Nilsen, 93, Australian businessman and politician.
- Dennis Simpson, 73, American baseball player.
- Norma Zarky, 60, American lawyer and activist, breast cancer.

=== 25 ===
- Helen Badgley, 68, American actress.
- William B. Bailey, 84, American politician, member of the Massachusetts House of Representatives (1947–1949).
- Leighton Dye, 75, American Olympic hurdler (1928).
- Saif Ghobash, 45, Emirati diplomat, shot.
- Félix Gouin, 93, French politician, prime minister (1946).
- Josef Håkestad, 70, Norwegian footballer.
- Taruho Inagaki, 76, Japanese writer.
- Joseph Mundassery, 74, Indian politician and literary critic.
- Karl Pedersen, 70, Norwegian footballer.
- Mathilde Willink, 39, Dutch model and socialite.

=== 26 ===
- Evelyn Alpern, 73, American psychiatrist.
- Mel Brewer, 59, American football player and coach, cancer.
- James Charles Castle, 78, American artist.
- Chiang Yee, 74, Chinese poet and painter.
- Elisabeth Flickenschildt, 72, German actress.
- Alma Hanlon, 87, American actress.
- Ibrahim Jalees, 53, Pakistani writer and journalist.
- Matvey Kononenko, 76, Soviet general.
- David Magarshack, 77, Russian-British biographer and translator.
- Henry Medd, 85, British architect.
- Julius Sagalowsky, 72, American tennis player.
- Ernst Schala, 61, Austrian Olympic field hockey player (1948, 1952).
- Rudolf Stahlecker, 78, German geologist.
- Jacques van Meegeren, 65, Dutch artist.
- Charles Wheeler, 96, Australian painter.
- Margaret Withers, 84, British actress.

=== 27 ===
- Therese Benedek, 84, Hungarian-American psychoanalyst, heart attack.
- Ralph Borsodi, 88, American agrarian theorist.
- Ken Burditt, 70, English footballer.
- James M. Cain, 85, American novelist (The Postman Always Rings Twice, Double Indemnity, Mildred Pierce).
- Léo Chauliac, 64, French jazz musician.
- Raymond Emerson, 90, American civil engineer and banker.
- John Beresford Fowler, 71, English interior designer, cancer.
- Estelle Avinger Haggard, 93, American educator.
- Ted Hinton, 73, American sheriff.
- Tony Hulman, 76, American racing executive, heart failure.
- Michel Jungblut, 90, Luxembourgish sculptor.
- Carlisle Littlejohn, 76, American baseball player.
- Red Lynn, 63, American baseball player.
- Miguel Mihura, 72, Spanish playwright.
- Firmin Monestime, 67, Haitian-Canadian politician.
- Sándor Nemes, 78, Hungarian football player and manager.
- Peg Leg Sam, 65, American blues musician.
- Ivo Radovniković, 59, Croatian football player and manager.
- Larry Sale, 84, American sheriff and soldier.
- Umberto Vittori, 70, Italian Olympic rower (1936).
- Sir Albert Wolff, 78, Australian jurist.

=== 28 ===
- Waldino Aguirre, 56, Argentine footballer, blunt force trauma.
- Kaj Birket-Smith, 84, Danish anthropologist.
- Lambros D. Callimahos, 66, Egyptian-born American cryptologist and flutist, cancer.
- Lee Cissel, 45, American football coach.
- Ralph Cleage, 79, American baseball player.
- Charles Fox, 99, English-New Zealand missionary.
- Norman P. Goss, 75, American engineer and inventor.
- Heinz Gronau, 65, German general.
- Feliksas Kriaučiūnas, 66, American basketball player and coach.
- Dioscoride Lanza, 79, Italian racing driver.
- Ralph L. Mason, 81, American politician, member of the Maryland Senate (1952–1958).
- Božidar Purić, 86, Yugoslav politician and diplomat, prime minister (1943–1944).
- Bruno Streckenbach, 75, German Nazi official.
- Aleksey Vysotsky, 58, Soviet journalist.

=== 29 ===
- George Clayton Abel, 68, Canadian fighter pilot.
- William Dale Archerd, 65, American convicted serial killer, pneumonia.
- James Randall Durfee, 79, American jurist.
- S. H. Ervin, 96, Australian businessman and philanthropist.
- Yrjö Keinonen, 65, Finnish general.
- Seison Maeda, 92, Japanese painter.
- Chiyonoyama Masanobu, 51, Japanese sumo wrestler, liver cancer.
- Bob McDonald, 54, Canadian ice hockey player.
- Millie Miller, 55, British politician, MP (since 1974), Hodgkin lymphoma.
- Josef Peskoller, 81, Austrian politician.
- Gheorghe Remenco, 58, Moldovan journalist and writer.
- Sahib Singh, 85, Indian writer and linguist.
- Ratko Vujović, 58, Yugoslav political activist.
- Vojtech Závodský, 73, Slovak football player and manager, stroke.

=== 30 ===
- Claude Anaru, 76, New Zealand community leader and politician.
- Irakli Bagration of Mukhrani, 68, Georgian royal.
- Pierre Collet, 63, French actor.
- Renato Curi, 24, Italian footballer, heart attack.
- Aimable Denhez, 63, French racing cyclist.
- Bill Drake, 82, American baseball player.
- Willy Guggenheim, 77, Swiss painter.
- W. L. Jarvis, 82, Australian evangelist and gospel singer.
- Gustav Krklec, 78, Croatian writer and translator.
- Stepan Lenkavskyi, 73, Ukrainian politician.
- Ronald MacKeith, 69, British paediatrician.
- Frederick Hamilton March, 86, Australian-Sudanese soldier and government official.
- Hōei Nojiri, 91, Japanese astronomer and essayist.
- Piers Weld-Forester, 31, British racing cyclist, racing crash.
- Joseph Zerilli, 79, Italian-born American mobster.

=== 31 ===
- George S. Ballif, 83, American missionary and attorney.
- Darrell Bunt, 75, British Anglican prelate.
- C. B. Colby, 73, American author.
- Herbert Hess, 69, German opera singer, heart failure.
- Willi Heyn, 66, German Olympic runner (1936).
- Lal Hilditch, 83, English footballer.
- Mykola Hlushchenko, 76, Soviet Ukrainian artist.
- Phyllis Kaberry, 67, American-born Australian anthropologist.
- Elbert G. Mathews, 66, American diplomat.
- Giuseppe Morandi, 83, Italian racing driver.
- Fred Neumann, 71, Australian footballer.
- Eva Taylor, 82, American singer and actress, cancer.
- Joan Tetzel, 56, American actress, cancer.
- John Tully, 72, Irish politician, TD (1948–1961, 1965–1969).
- Gus Young, 67, American basketball coach, heart attack.
