= Alpern =

Alpern is a surname. Notable people with the name include:

- Anne X. Alpern (1903–1981), American jurist and politician
- Anita Alpern (1920–2006), American government administrator
- Evelyn Alpern (1903–1977), American psychiatrist
- Mathew Alpern (1920–1996), American physiologist
- Merry Alpern (born 1955), American photographer
- Ruth Alpern Madoff (born 1941), American wife of Bernie Madoff
- Sara Alpern (born 1942), American historian
- Steve Alpern, American mathematician
