= George Crick =

English footballer (1888–1982)

Personal information
- Full name: George William Crick
- Date of birth: 1 December 1888
- Place of birth: Desborough, England
- Date of death: 5 April 1982 (aged 93)
- Place of death: Kettering, England
- Height: 5 ft 9 in (1.75 m)
- Position: Half-back

Youth career
- 1903–1907: Desborough United

Senior career*
Years	Team	Apps	(Gls)
1907–1910	Desborough Town		
1910–1911	Northampton Town		
1911–1913	Desborough Town		
1913–1914	Market Harborough Town		
1914–1915	Southampton	9	(0)
1919–1932	Kettering Town		
- * Club domestic league appearances and goals

George William Crick (1 December 1888 – 5 April 1982) was an English footballer who played in various defensive positions, for Southampton in the Southern League in 1915.

== Football career ==
Crick was born in Desborough, Northamptonshire and played his early football with various local clubs, including Northampton Town, before joining Market Harborough Town of the Leicestershire Senior League. In May 1914, he and teammate Harry Hall joined Southampton.

Crick initially played in the reserves, before replacing the injured George Hadley at right-half for the Southern League match against Millwall on 23 January 1915. An adaptable player, he made eightfurther appearances as cover for either Hadley, John Denby (at centre-half) or George Green (at right-back).

Following the suspension of league football in 1915, Crick enlisted in the army in December 1915, serving at first with the Northamptonshire Regiment, before transferring to the Machine Gun Corps in May 1917, with whom he earned the Military Medal for gallantry.

After the war, he joined Kettering Town where he remained until 1932, when his career was ended by a cartilage injury. After retiring from football, he worked in the Corby steelworks as a storeman.
