= Puigaudeau =

Puigaudeau is a surname. Notable people with the surname include:

- Ferdinand du Puigaudeau (1864–1930), French painter
- Odette du Puigaudeau (1894–1991), French ethnologist
