= Ballif =

Ballif is a surname. Notable people with the surname include:

- Algie Eggertsen Ballif (1896–1984), American educational leader and politician
- Bonnie Ballif-Spanvill, American academic
- Claude Ballif (1924–2004), French composer
- George S. Ballif (1894–1977), American Mormon missionary and lawyer
- Jae R. Ballif (born 1931), American university administrator
