= Giosuè =

Giosuè is an Italian male given name, cognate to English Joshua. Notable people and characters with the name include:

== People ==
- Giosuè Argenti, Italian sculptor
- Giosuè Bonomi, Italian bicycle racer
- Giosuè Carducci, Italian poet
- Giosuè Cattarossi, Italian cleric
- Giosuè Cozzarelli, Panamanian beauty queen
- Giosuè Fiorentino, Italian politician
- Giosuè Fioriti, Italian football player
- Giosuè Gallucci, Italian-American criminal
- Giosuè Sangiovanni, Italian zoologist
- Giosuè Stucchi, Italian football player

== Other uses ==
- Giosuè Orefice, a character from the 1997 Italian film Life Is Beautiful
