= Edward Nelson (disambiguation) =

Edward Nelson (1932–2014) was an American mathematician.

Edward Nelson or Ed Nelson may also refer to:

- Edward William Nelson (1855–1934), American naturalist and ethnologist
- Edward Nelson (Alamo defender) (1816–36)
- Edward Nelson (marine biologist) (1883–1923), member of the Terra Nova Expedition
- Edward Nelson, 5th Earl Nelson (1860–1951)
- Edward Nelson Jr. (1931–2018), United States Coast Guard admiral
- Edward Theophilus Nelson (1874–1940), British barrister
- Ed Nelson (1928–2014), American actor
- Ed Nelson (baseball) (fl. 1940s), American baseball player
- Ed Nelson (basketball) (Edward Richard Nelson, born 1982), American basketball player

== See also ==
- Edwin Nelson (disambiguation)
- Ned Nelson (1911–1977), American college baseball and basketball player
- Ted Nelson (disambiguation)
- Ed Neilson (born 1963), American politician
