= Jack Small (footballer) =

English footballer (1889–1946)

Personal information
- Full name: John Small
- Date of birth: 29 October 1889
- Place of birth: South Bank, Middlesbrough, England
- Date of death: 9 December 1946 (aged 57)
- Height: 5 ft 10 in (1.78 m)
- Position: Half-back

Youth career
- South Bank North End

Senior career*
Years	Team	Apps	(Gls)
–	Craghead United		
1912–1913	Sunderland	1	(0)
1913–1915	Southampton	47	(2)
1919–1920	Thornycrofts		
1920	Mid Rhondda		
- * Club domestic league appearances and goals

Jack Small (29 October 1889 – 9 December 1946) was an English professional footballer who played at wing-half either side of the First World War.

== Football career ==
Small was born at South Bank, Middlesbrough and attended St. Peter's School, South Bank. He started his football career with Craghead United, playing in the Chester-le-Street & District League, before joining Sunderland of the Football League First Division in August 1912.

Small spent most of his time at Roker Park in the reserves and his only first-team appearance for Sunderland came in a 3–1 victory at Manchester United on 15 March 1913.

In August 1913, he moved to the south coast to join Southampton of the Southern League. He made his debut for the "Saints" in the opening match of the 1913–14 season, a 1–0 defeat at Brighton. Small soon became a popular player at The Dell who was "admired not only by the crowd but also by his colleagues". He was "the sort of player whose influence on team spirit was always positive (who) relished a challenge and his sturdy half-back play was an inspiration".

He retained his place at right-half for the first twelve matches of the season until, after a run of four defeats, he lost his place to John Denby. Small returned to the side in February replacing George Hadley and kept his place for the rest of the season. Small started the following season at right-half until November when he moved to right-back to replace George Green until Green's return in March. By the end of the season, England was at war and normal football was suspended. Small played in six wartime fixtures, until joining the R.A.M.C. at the end of 1915.

== Later career ==
Small spent sixteen months serving with the R.A.M.C. in Salonika before injuries caused him to be invalided back to Southampton, where he suffered a serious bout of malaria.

After the war, he was a member of the Thornycrofts team which took First Division Burnley to a replay in the FA Cup first round, where they were defeated 5–0 after a scoreless draw at The Dell.

He then spent a few months back in the Southern League with Mid Rhondda, before retiring from professional football in December 1920 and taking up employment with Harland & Wolff. He later joined the Merchant navy.
