= Merv Smith =

Merv Smith or Mervyn Smith may refer to:

- Merv Smith (footballer) (1924–1977), Australian rules footballer
- Merv Smith (broadcaster) (1933–2018), New Zealand radio personality
- Mervyn Ashmore Smith (1904–1994), Australian painter
