= Radley (disambiguation) =

Radley is a village and civil parish near Abingdon, Oxfordshire, England.

Radley may also refer to:

== Places ==
- Radley College, English public school in the village of Radley, Oxfordshire
- Radley railway station, a station on the Oxford–London railway line serving Radley and Abingdon
- Radley, Indiana, unincorporated town in Grant County, Indiana, USA
- Radley, Kansas
- Radley Sanitarium, a fictional psychiatric hospital in the Pretty Little Liars franchise

== People ==
- Alfred Radley (1924–2019), British clothing manufacturer
- Radley Balko (born 1975), American journalist, author, blogger, and speaker
- Radley Metzger (1929–2017), American filmmaker and film distributor
- Adrian Radley (born 1976), Australian swimmer
- Chuck Radley (1925–1977), Canadian football player
- Clive Radley (born 1944), English cricketer
- Gordon Radley (1898–1970), British engineer at Dollis Hill, the Post Office Research Station.
- James Radley (1885–1959), one of the first English aviators
- Jeffrey Radley (1930–1975), British archaeologist
- Kate Radley (born 1967), keyboard player for the British rock band Spiritualized
- Paul Radley
- Simon Radley (born 1965), British chef
- Victor Radley (born 1998), Australian professional rugby league footballer
- Yip Radley (1908–1963), professional ice hockey player

=== Characters ===
- Arthur "Boo" Radley, a character from the novel To Kill a Mockingbird
- Radley Heeler, the older brother of Bandit Heeler from the 2018 TV series Bluey

== Other uses ==
- Radley (company), handbag designer and company
- Radley (short film), 2021 short film
