= Queen Nouna =

Nouna or Noula was a Christian queen of Morocco who reigned over the Canary Islands and Souss during the Christian era.

== Biography ==
=== Origins and realm ===
Nouna was an Amazigh Christian queen who, landing from the Canary Islands in the Atlantic, would have easily reigned over the Souss up to Saguia el-Hamra.

Noun would only be the derivative of Nouna which gave its name to her kingdom. According to the Spanish traveler Joaquín Gatell y Folch in 1864, she would be the godmother of the entire province of Noun.

According to Odette du Puigaudeau, Queen Nouna engraved her name on the remains of the famous site of Agadir Nouna. This site is located around Tiliwîn and also at Tizi-n-Tarroumit (the Christian lady's pass) on the left slope of Oued Assaka.

In some maps there is a city named Noun, indicated as the capital of the territory, while the real capital is today Augilmim. Noun now exists only in ruins.

In a document that demarcates a property in the qsar of Tissegnan, we read: "the limits between [their] properties known at the ma'adar lazrag in the plain of Oued Nouna (bathat wad nûna)...", alluding to the Christian figure.

=== Legacy ===
She would have had descendants, since in Asrir, the Amazighs claim to be descended from a Christian; while Oued Noun was founded by "Nouna en-Nasraniyya" (Nouna the Christian).
