= Eugen Wiedmaier =

German political activist

Wiedmaier, undated

Eugen Wiedmaier (16 November 1900 – 14 March 1940) was a German political activist and party official (KPD) who engaged in anti-fascist resistance after 1933. Following six years in solitary confinement, he died while detained at the main penitentiary in Ludwigsburg, during the first part of 1940. The death was reported as a suicide.

== Life ==
Eugen Wiedmaier was born into a working-class family in Zuffenhausen, then just outside Stuttgart to the north. He attended school locally and then undertook commercial training. He worked for a succession of businesses as a sales representative till 1932.

He joined the Social Democratic Party (SPD) in 1918, switching almost immediately to the anti-war Independent Social Democratic Party (USPD). As the USDP itself broke apart, in 1919 he joined the newly launched Communist Party (KPD), remaining a member at least till the party was outlawed in 1933. Wiedmaier was a co-founder of the Free Young Socialists in Württemberg and from 1920 served as secretary of the Württemberg Young Communists (KJD). It was also in 1920 that he became a member of the Communist Party's Württemberg regional leadership team (Bezirksleitung).

Wiedmaier relocated to Berlin in 1921, although there are indications that he retained close links with his home region. In 1922 he joined the KJD's Berlin-based national leadership team, appointed "Secretary for Anti-militarist Work" (Sekretär für antimilitaristische Arbeit). (Note: For the Communist Party, "Anti-militarist Work" involved extensive international liaison with Communist parties in various European countries and, for the Communist Party of Germany, extensive "party intelligence" work on the domestic front.)

In 1923, following the French military occupation of the Ruhr the KJD leadership sent him to the region as a party instructor. After serving for several months as secretary to the KJD regional leadership team (Bezirksleitung), he was appointed to take responsibility for KJD (Note: When consulting sources, please be aware that in 1925 the Kommunistische Jugend Deutschlands (KJD) became part of the Kommunistischer Jugendverband Deutschlands (KJVD) (see Young Communist League of Germany), which marked its merger with the "Sozialistischen Proletarierjugend".) party instructor activities across the Saar, Palatinate and Württemberg regions.

1923 was also the year in which Eugen Wiedmaier married Maria Siegloch (1896–1977), the daughter of a railway worker and, like Wiedmaier, a communist activist originally from Zuffenhausen. She came to the partnership with a son from her first marriage, but there is no mention of any children born from the marriage of Eugen and Maria Wiedmaier.

In 1924 the PartyCentral Committee summoned Wiedmaier back to Berlin where he served between 1924 and 1929 as a member of the regional leadership team (Bezirksleitung) for Berlin-Brandenburg and as a "Policy Leader" (Polleiter) for the Berlin-Tempelhof sub-region. In June 1929 he was a delegate at the twelfth party conference. The Central Committee now sent him to Danzig where during 1929/31 he served as party secretary for the Bezirksleitung. During 1931/32 he filled the same role in Silesia. Returning to the region of his birth, starting in 1932 he served as Organisation Secretary (Organisationssekretär) for the Party Bezirksleitung in Württemberg.

In January 1933 a National Socialist government took power. During the first part of the year Democratic Germany was transformed progressively but rapidly into a one-party dictatorship. Although the Communist Party was now banned, Wiedmaier moved in February 1933 to the Magdeburg region, accepting a Central Committee appointment as a party instructor with responsibilities extending across central-southern Germany, notably Thuringia and Saxony. By the start of 1934 he was active as a party instructor in Baden. It was here that he was arrested, together with other party activists and officials, at a clandestine meeting in Karlsruhe on 26 January 1934. It turned out that a party courier from Berlin whom they had been expecting to join them was a police spy. In December 1934 he faced the usual charge, under circumstances of this kind, of preparing to commit high treason (Vorbereitung zum Hochverrat). and was sentenced by the Regional High Court in Karlsruhe to a thirty-month jail term. Several other prominent local communists were convicted and sentenced at the same time. Communist networks after 1933 were by definition highly secretive, making their detailed operational arrangements hard to determine for the authorities and, indeed, for subsequent researchers. In 1936 major trial took place at Kalrsruhe following the identification of a surviving network. Although he had by this time been incarcerated for more than two years, Wiedmaier was among those tried, convicted and sentenced. In practical terms, this could be seen as a retrial: it involved an increase of the jail sentence he was already serving to a total length of twelve and a half years.

Eugen Wiedmaier died at the main penitentiary in Ludwigsburg, during the first part of 1940. Sources differ over whether the death was a suicide or a murder.
