= Harry Hall (footballer, born 1889) =

English footballer

Personal information
- Date of birth: 1st qtr. 1889
- Place of birth: Fleckney, England
- Height: 5 ft 8 in (1.73 m)
- Position: Inside right

Senior career*
Years	Team	Apps	(Gls)
- Market Harborough Town
1914–1915	Southampton	1	(0)
- * Club domestic league appearances and goals

Harry Hall was an English footballer who played as an inside-forward for Southampton in the Southern League in 1915.

== Football career ==
Hall was born in Fleckney in Leicestershire and played his early football with Market Harborough Town in the Leicestershire Senior League.

Hall originally played in the reserves before making his solitary first-team appearance as a replacement for Arthur Dominy at inside-right for the Southern League match at Bristol Rovers on 17 March 1915, with his former Market Harborough colleague George Crick at centre-half.

Hall remained with Southampton through the First World War, making two appearances in the wartime leagues, but was released before the resumption of league football in 1919.
