= Ted Nelson (disambiguation) =

Ted Nelson (born 1937), is an American pioneer of information technology, sociologist, and philosopher.

Ted Nelson may also refer to:

- Ted Nelson (track and field) (born 1943), American track and field athlete and coach
- Ted Nelson (runner, born 1938), American steeplechase runner, 1959 All-American for Mankato State
- Ted S. Nelson (1935–2025), Guamanian politician
- Teddy Nelson (Terje Nielsen, 1939–1992), Norwegian country music artist

== See also ==
- Edward Nelson (disambiguation)
