= Albert-Paul Granier =

French lyricist

Albert-Paul Granier (3 September 1888 in Le Croisic – 17 August 1917 near Verdun) was a French lyricist.

== Biography ==
Albert-Paul Granier was the son of an art-loving notary and so he came into contact with music and literature at an early age. The composer Gabriel Fauré was among others an acquaintance of the family. Albert-Paul Granier first attended the school in Le Croisic, later in Saint-Nazaire, where he made his baccalauréat in 1908. Then he attended the notary school in Nantes and graduated successfully in 1910. Albert-Paul Granier fulfilled his three-year military service in Paris where he remained until the outbreak of World War I. From the time of the outbreak of war Albert-Paul Granier was relocated to an artillery unit. This unit fought at the front in Verdun in 1916. In 1917 Albert-Paul Granier was transferred on his own request from artillery to air force where he served as an observer on reconnaissance flights around Verdun. In one of these flights, the plane of Albert-Paul Granier was hit by a shell and completely destroyed. His body was never found.

== Work ==
Albert-Paul Granier wrote lyrical texts and also composed music since his youth. The love song Absente for example dates from his last school year 1908. It is also known that Albert-Paul Granier participated in the Parisian artistic scene before the outbreak of war and attended concerts, wrote poetry and continued to compose. He also wrote poems about the horrors of war while fighting at the front in Verdun. A collection of these poems was published in 1917 under the title Les Coqs et les Vautours. At that time, the publication was given little attention and Albert-Paul Granier and his work fell into oblivion for many decades. In 2008, the French linguist Claude Duneton rediscovered the publication and sought a new edition. This recent publication was highly praised in reviews and the quality of the works of Albert-Paul Granier was compared to that of Guillaume Apollinaire. A translation of the collection into English took place in 2014.

== Publications ==
- Les Coqs et les Vautours
  - first edition: Jouve & Cie, 1917
  - new edition: Les Equateurs, 2008 (ISBN 978-2849901090), editor: Claude Duneton
  - English translation: Saxon Books, 2014 (ISBN 978-0952896975), translator: Ian Higgins
- Marche nuptiale for organ (1909)
- Absente, for voice and piano (1908)
