= Maria Wiedmaier =

German political activist

Maria Wiedmaier (born Maria Siegloch: 19 October 1896 – 20 October 1977) was a German political activist (KPD) who engaged in anti-fascist resistance during the twelve Nazi years. She spent most of that time in a succession of state detention institutions, ending the war as a survivor from the Ravensbrück concentration camp.

== Life ==
=== Family provenance and early years ===
Maria Siegloch was born in Zuffenhausen, a quarter of Stuttgart on the city's north side. The third of her parents' seven recorded children, she was born into a "railway family". Between 1910 and 1916 she worked at the Salamander shoe factory in nearby Kornwestheim. Meanwhile, war broke out in 1914, and from 1916 she was working at a munitions factory in Feuerbach. It was here that she met Albert Volz, a co-worker whom she married that same year.

=== Weimar years ===
At the end of 1918 she joined the Independent Social Democratic Party ("Unabhängige Sozialdemokratische Partei Deutschlands" / USPD) which had broken away from the mainstream Social Democratic Party (SPD) following vigorous internal party disagreement over whether or not to support funding for the war. When the USPD in turn splintered she was a member of the left wing majority who moved across to the newly emerging Communist Party. Together with Heinrich Rau and Eugen Wiedmaier she was a co-founder, in 1923, of the Communist Party's Zuffenhausen branch.

The marriage to Albert Volz had resulted in a son, but in other respects Volz was by this point out of the picture: in 1923 she married Eugen Wiedmaier and the two of them relocated to Berlin. This turned out to only be the first of several moves undertaken in connection with party work. The focus of her party work at this stage was on women's matters and youth issues. In 1924/25 she worked in a party secretarial capacity for the party regional leadership (Bezirksleitung) in Saarbrücken, at the heart of an industrial region in western Germany still, at this stage, under French occupation. From 1925 she was a designated "party instructor" for the Party Central Committee. Party work also took her to the Palatinate.

In 1929/30 she was a student at the Comintern's International Lenin School in Moscow. On returning to Germany she took a full-time position with the district leadership team for the important Berlin-Brandenburg region. The political backdrop changed following the Nazi power seizure in January 1933. The Reichstag fire at the end of February 1933 was immediately blamed on "communists". Meanwhile, the new government lost no time in converting Germany into a one-party dictatorship. Nevertheless, between January 1933 and April 1935 Wiedmeier worked (illegally) as a party instructor in Berlin. From 1934 she was actively engaged with the "Anti-militarist" group around Emil Pietzuch, undertaking several covert trips to Moscow as a courier. According to a subsequent court determination she was also involved in the "Resistance Group G" headed up by Hans Gasparitsch.

=== Nazi years ===
Eugen Wiedmaier was arrested in January 1934 in Karlsruhe and detained pending trial. His trial followed at the end of the year and he received a thirty-month prison term. However, before the term had been expunged he faced another trial which ended with a 12 1/2-year sentence. In the event, after six years in solitary confinement in Ludwigsburg jail, Eugen Wiedmeier was murdered there. On 6 April 1935 Maria Wiedmaier was arrested in Berlin. There followed nearly three years in "investigative custody". On 28 February 1938 she faced the court. She testified that she had been disinherited by her father, while her inheritance from her mother's estate along with her own household goods and furniture had been appropriated by the Gestapo "to cover court costs". She was sentenced to a five and a half year prison term. As matters turned out, as early as October 1940 she was transferred to the Ravensbrück concentration camp, where she spent the rest of the war.

=== Soviet occupation zone / German Democratic Republic ===
With the end of the war, formally in May 1945, Maria Wiedmeier was freed from the concentration camp. Surrounding Berlin, a large region of what had been Germany was now administered as the Soviet occupation zone (after October 1949 relaunched as the Soviet sponsored German Democratic Republic). Between 1945 and 1949 she worked in the social services department in Berlin's Charlottenburg quarter. She now took part in constructing anti-fascist structures in the Berlin administration and led the Fascism Victim's (Opfer des Faschismus / OdF) Committee in Charlottenburg. She was one of the speakers at the first OdF demonstration, in 1945. After the division of the city administration she became an employee of the Council (Magistrat) of East Berlin. In 1948 she received a formal reprimand on account of "deficiencies in the cooperation of the VVN and the SED". The VVN was the Union of Persecutees of the Nazi Regime: the SED was the recently constructed Socialist Unity Party which was rapidly becoming the ruling party in a new kind of one-party dictatorship.

In 1949 she moved briefly to Zuffenhausen, since 1945 in the US occupation zone, where she stayed with her son in an attempt to recover her health, still shattered as a result of her wartime experiences.

She then settled back in East Germany where she married Harry Kuhn, a Buchenwald survivor who at one stage became General Secretary of the VVN.

In 1976 she was awarded the Patriotic Order of Merit (gold clasp) having already received lower levels of the award in 1958 and 1971.

Maria Wiedmeier died on 20 December 1977 in Glienicke near Potsdam.
