= Craghead United F.C. =

Football club in County Durham, England

Craghead United F.C. was an English association football club based in the village of Craghead, County Durham. The team initially competed in the Chester-le-Street & District Football League. They unsuccessfully applied to enter the Northern Football Alliance in 1908—receiving no votes from the member clubs—before joining the Northern League in 1912. They finished fifth in both their seasons in the division before leaving the league at the end of the 1913–14 season. Craghead United subsequently submitted another application to the Northern Alliance in 1920 and were accepted into the league along with Backworth United and Hexham Comrades, and the reserve teams of Ashington and Durham City.

Craghead United entered the FA Cup for the first time in the 1907–08 season, but were defeated in the preliminary round by Leadgate Park. The club enjoyed their best run in the Cup during the 1909–10 campaign, defeating Crook Town and Stanley United before losing to Seaham Harbour in the third qualifying round. Craghead United were knocked out in the second qualifying round on two occasions, but generally struggled to progress past the preliminary stage. During their last five seasons in the FA Cup between 1924 and 1929, the team failed to win a single match.

Despite being an amateur team, Craghead United were represented by several players who also played professional football. Walter Coates, who went on to play for Fulham and Leeds United, and Arthur Thomson, who had a spell at Manchester United, both spent some of their early careers at the club. Harry Pringle and Jack Small, who both went on to play in the Football League, both started their careers with Craghead United.

== FA Cup history ==
Season	Round	Date	Opponents	H/A	Result
1907–08	Preliminary round	21 September 1907	Leadgate Park	Away	1–2
1908–09	First qualifying round	3 October 1908	Annfield Plain	Away	4–1
1908–09	Second qualifying round	17 October 1908	Leadgate Park	Away	2–3
1909–10	Preliminary round	18 September 1909	Sunderland West End	Home	4–2
1909–10	First qualifying round	2 October 1909	Crook Town	Home	3–2
1909–10	Second qualifying round	16 October 1909	Stanley United	Away	1–0
1909–10	Third qualifying round	6 November 1909	Seaham Harbour	Away	1–5
1910–11	Preliminary round	17 September 1910	Spennymoor United	Away	0–0
1910–11	Preliminary round	21 September 1910	Spennymoor United	Home	1–2
1911–12	Extra preliminary round	9 September 1911	Grangetown	Away	7–1
1911–12	Preliminary round	16 September 1911	Haswell	Away	0–1
1912–13	Preliminary round	28 September 1913	Sunderland Rovers	Away	1–1
1912–13	Preliminary round	2 October 1911	Sunderland Rovers	Home	2–3
1913–14	Preliminary round	27 September 1913	Leadgate Park	Away	2–1
1913–14	First qualifying round	11 October 1913	Langley Park	Home	2–1
1913–14	Second qualifying round	1 November 1913	Horden Athletic	Home	0–0
1913–14	Second qualifying round	5 November 1913	Horden Athletic	Away	0–4
1914–15	Preliminary round	26 September 1914	Dipton United	Home	2–1
1914–15	First qualifying round	10 October 1914	Birtley	Away	2–3
1919–20	Preliminary round	27 September 1908	Boldon Colliery	Away	0–1
1920–21	Extra preliminary round	11 September 1920	Wingate Albion Comrades	Home	0–0
1920–21	Extra preliminary round	15 September 1920	Wingate Albion Comrades	Away	4–0
1920–21	Preliminary round	25 September 1920	Birtley	Away	0–1
1921–22	Preliminary round	24 September 1921	Wingate Albion Comrades	Home	1–0
1921–22	First qualifying round	8 October 1921	Esh Winning	Home	1–2
1922–23	Extra preliminary round	9 September 1922	Consett Swifts	Home	2–1
1922–23	Preliminary round	23 September 1922	Horden Athletic	Away	1–2
1923–24	Preliminary round	22 September 1923	Annfield Plain	Home	3–0
1923–24	First qualifying round	6 October 1923	Birtley	Away	1–1
1923–24	First qualifying round	10 October 1923	Birtley	Home	4–0
1923–24	Second qualifying round	20 October 1923	Leadgate Park	Away	1–3
1924–25	Preliminary round	20 September 1924	Crook Town	Away	1–1
1924–25	Preliminary round	24 September 1924	Crook Town	Home	0–2
1925–26	Preliminary round	19 September 1925	Horden Athletic	Home	2–2
1925–26	Preliminary round	23 September 1925	Horden Athletic	Away	0–4
1926–27	Extra preliminary round	4 September 1926	Thornley Albion	Home	0–0
1926–27	Extra preliminary round	8 September 1926	Thornley Albion	Away	1–2
1927–28	Extra preliminary round	3 September 1927	Chopwell Institute	Away	3–4
1928–29	Extra preliminary round	1 September 1928	Ferryhill Athletic	Home	4–4
1928–29	Extra preliminary round	5 September 1928	Ferryhill Athletic	Away	3–4
