= Edwin Nelson =

Edwin Nelson may refer to:

- Edwin L. Nelson (1940–2003), United States federal judge
- Ed Nelson (Edwin Stafford Nelson, 1928–2014), American actor
- Edwin Nelson (politician) (1881–1961), Idaho politician

== See also ==
- Edward Nelson (disambiguation)
