= Walter Coates =

English footballer

Personal information
- Full name: Walter Albert Coates
- Date of birth: 4 April 1895
- Place of birth: Burnhope, England
- Date of death: 8 November 1936 (aged 39)
- Place of death: Lanchester, England
- Position: Winger

Senior career*
Years	Team	Apps	(Gls)
1912–1913	Burnhope		
1913–1914	Craghead United		
1914–1915	Sacriston United		
1919–1920	Fulham	2	(0)
1920–1921	Leadgate Park		
1921–1925	Leeds United	47	(3)
1925–1926	Newport County	26	(5)
1926–1928	Linfield		
1928–1929	Hartlepools United	2	(0)
1929	Chester-le-Street		
1930	Newport (IOW)		
1931	Burnhope Institute		
1932	Consett		
Total		77	(8)
- * Club domestic league appearances and goals

Walter Albert Coates (4 April 1895 – 8 November 1936) was an English footballer who played in the Football League for Fulham, Hartlepools United, Leeds United and Newport County.

Four years after his last professional game, Coates was found lying unconscious on the Burnhope Road in Lanchester. He died the following day, having never regained consciousness, and was suspected of having had a seizure.
