= Wally Colliss =

Australian rules footballer (1908–1977)

Personal information
- Full name: Walter Colliss
- Born: 22 May 1908; Yarragon, Victoria
- Died: 8 October 1977 (aged 69); Kew, Victoria
- Original team: Coburg

Playing career^{1}
Years	Club	Games (Goals)
1932	Essendon	1 (0)
- ^{1} Playing statistics correct to the end of 1932.

Wally Colliss (22 May 1908 – 8 October 1977) was an Australian rules footballer who played with Essendon in the Victorian Football League (VFL).
