= Bantu Philosophy =

Book by Placide Tempels

Bantu Philosophy (La philosophie bantoue in French) is a 1945 book written by Placide Tempels which aims to describe the inherent philosophical structure of the understanding of reality shared by the Bantu peoples of Central, East, and Southern Africa. This philosophical structure is built from a logically consistent system of concepts that express the experience of reality and the meaning of life practices in Bantu cultures.

== Overview ==
In his book, Tempels argues that in the shared understanding of reality of Bantu speaking peoples, philosophical categories can be identified through the categories inherent to their languages. According to Tempels, the primary ontological category in the thought of Bantu-speaking peoples is a dynamic category, which he names vital force or vital energy, and the category of static being is secondary. He opposes this to European or Western philosophy, where being is the primary ontological category, and force or energy is secondary. So in Bantu understanding, reality is perceived primarily as dynamic.

Tempels argues that there are three possible views of the relationship between being and force:

- Being as distinct from force, that is, beings may have force or may not.
- Force as part of being, that is, being is more than force, but dependent upon it.
- Being is force, that is, the two are one and the same.

He argues that members of Bantu-speaking cultures hold the last mentioned view of force. Specifically:

... in contradistinction to our definition of being as "that which is", or "the thing insofar as it is", the Bantu definition reads, "that which is force", or "the thing insofar as it is force", or "an existent force". We must insist once again that "force" is not for Bantu a necessary, irreducible attribute of being: no, the notion "force" takes for them the place of the notion "being" in our philosophy. Just as we have, so have. they a transcendental. elemental, simple concept : with them "force" with us "being".

— Placide Tempels, Bantu Philosophy, p. 52 (Colin King translation, published 1959 by Présence Africaine).

Tempels argues that as a result of this fundamental difference in categories, the approach of life and the understanding of reality in Bantu cultures is structured around vital force, which he contrasts with the Western enterprise of understanding reality and dealing with life problems from the basic concept of static being.

== Publication history ==
Placide Tempels wrote his book in (Flemish-) Dutch, his original language. The chapters were first published one by one in two different journals Equatoria and Band. This first version was in Dutch.

His friend Émile Possoz, magistrate in Congo, who had also inspired him to write the book, immediately started to translate the chapters in French, the main language in the Belgian colony. When Lovania wanted to publish it as a book, in French, they asked for another translator. For this project Antoine Rubbens, another friend of Tempels was found. His translation is in the 1945 Lovania edition.

Only after this publication the Dutch version came out as a book, titled Bantoe-filosofie, in 1946 with publishing house De Sikkel in Antwerp, Belgium. This version contains the words 'original version' on the title page.

When the Parisian publishing house Présence Africaine wanted to republish it, Tempels corrected Rubbens first version extensively, and this became the 1949 edition. A third French translation, which aimed to correct errors in the earlier versions and get closer to the Dutch original, was made by Tempels expert A.J. Smet in 2001, which is published online. See external link below.

In 1956 a German translation by Joseph Peters titled Bantu-Philosophie. Ontologie und Ethik, was published at Wolfgang Rothe Verlag. This contains several articles by German Africanists after the main text. In 1959 Présence Africaine now published an English translation of the book, made by Colin King.

The Présence Africaine translations are the most widely read versions of Bantu Philosophy. There are still others, however. In Angola, two different translations in Portuguese were made, and there also exists an Italian translation, and recently a Spanish translation has been published. All these apparently are made on the basis of the French 1949 edition.

== See also ==
- Ben Dekker - Bantu Philosophy was the subject of his master's degree thesis in 1969.
- The Fight (book) - describes the Bantu philosophy, comparing it to boxing

== Bibliography ==
- Mubabinge Bilolo, La Sémiologie d'un hommage au Révérend Père Placide Tempels. In : Ethique et Société. Actes de la 3ème Semaine Philosophique de Kinshasa, avril 1978 (Coll. Recherches Philosophiques Africaines, 5), Kinshasa, 1980, p. 307-331.
- Mubabinge Bilolo, La Philosophie Nègre dans l'œuvre d'Emile Possoz. I. de 1928-1945, in Revue Africaine de Théologie, V, 10 (1981), p. 197-225.
- Mubabinge Bilolo, L'impact d'Emile Possoz sur P. Tempels. Introduction au destin du possozianisme. In Revue Africaine de Théologie, 11 (1982), p. 27-57.
- Fr. Bontinck, Aux origines de La philosophie bantoue, Kinshasa/Limete, FTC, 1985.
- Diagne, Souleymane Bachir (2000) "Revisiter « La Philosophie bantoue », L'idée d'une grammaire philosophique". In Politique africaine 2000/1 (N° 77), pages 44 à 53.
- Smet, A.J., Histoire de la philosophie africaine contemporaine: Courants et problèmes (Cours et documents, 5). Kinshasa-Limete, Départ. de PRA, FTC, 1980, 299 p. - Bibliographie, p. 5-14 et 277–292.
- Monnier, Laurent (1993). "L'arrière-plan historique de la Philosophie bantoue de Tempels: La Rébellion". Le Zaïre à l'épreuve de l'histoire immédiate: hommage à Benoît Verhaegen. Paris: Karthala. pp. 105–24. ISBN 2-86537-409-2.
- Roothaan, Angela (2022) "Terug naar Bantoe Filosofie. Tekst en betekenis van het werk van Placide Tempels". In: FILOSOFIE & PRAKTIJK, 43 (2022) 3+4, pp. 77–91.
- Vinck, Honoré (2012). "Ideology in Missionary Scholarly Knowledge in Belgian Congo: Aequatoria, Centre de recherches africanistes; The Mission Station of Bamanya (RDC), 1937-2007". In Harries, Patrick; Maxwell, David (eds.). The Spiritual in the Secular: Missionaries and Knowledge about Africa. Grand Rapids, MI: W.B. Eerdmans Pub. Co. pp. 221–44. ISBN 978-0-8028-6634-9.
