= Mathew Alpern =

American physiologist

Mathew Alpern (September 22, 1920 – May 16, 1996) was an American physiologist known for his research on color vision and color blindness. He was born in Akron, Ohio. He graduated from University of Florida in 1946 and from Ohio State University in 1950 with a PhD supervised by Glenn A. Fry. He was elected to the National Academy of Sciences in 1991. He died on May 16, 1996, at the University of Michigan Health System of congestive heart failure.

== Awards ==
- Edgar D. Tillyer Award, 1984
- Charles F. Prentice Medal, 1988
- Honorary Doctor of Science from the State University of New York, 1988
