= Emil Pietzuch =

Emil Pietzuch (9 March 1899 – 1943?) was a German Communist activist-militant. After 1933 non-Nazi political activity was banned: Pietzuch became a resistance activist. Although few precise details of his activism during the early Hitler period survive, it is believed that he was at the centre of a resistance network ("...Widerstandorganisation Emil Pietzuch") in Berlin comprising at least 40 men and women. He was forced to flee the country for the last time in 1937 and ended up in the Soviet Union where he fell foul of the institutionalised paranoia that was a feature of Stalin's rule. He died in a Soviet labour camp, probably at the end of 1943.

During the years of one-party dictatorship in East Germany between 1949 and 1990 Pietzuch was officially celebrated as a war hero, and it was believed by scholars that he had been parachuted back into Germany near Munich, and then captured and murdered by Nazi "SS" paramilitaries during 1944, towards the end of the war. It was only with the opening up of previously concealed government records that followed the political collapse of the East German and Soviet dictatorships in 1989/90 that Margarete Forszpaniak, a former resistance comrade, disclosed the truth about Pietzuch's death to the historian Hans-Rainer Sandvoß, having herself learned it two decades earlier from Heinz Wieland, the responsible East German Central Committee official.

== Life and activism ==
=== Provenance and early years ===
Emil Pietzuch was born in Neurode, near Breslau (as Wrocław was known before) 1945). He grew up in conditions of some poverty and trained as a carpenter-joiner. During the final part of the First World War he was conscripted for war service. After the war ended he settled in Berlin.

=== International communist ===
In August 1922 Pietzuch joined the recently launched Communist Party. In 1924 he took over party duties as head of the "Zersetzungsapparat" (loosely, "degradation apparatus"), targeting military and police personnel in the Berlin-Brandenburg region. Towards the end of 1925 he was arrested in connection with this activity. He faced trial at the Supreme Court of Justice which determined that he had been disseminating "anti-military propaganda among army and police personnel" ("...antimilitaristische Propaganda unter der Reichswehr und der Schutzpolizei"), which supported a charge of "preparing high treason" ("Vorbereitung zum Hochverrat"). Found guilty in June 1926, he was sentenced to a thirty-month jail term.

After a conditional early release in the middle part of 1927 Pitzuch made his way to Mannheim where he became a party organiser ("Orgleiter") for the Baden region. He returned to Berlin in 1928. He now worked with the Trades Union department of the Party Central Committee. Later that year he traveled to Moscow where he took part on the Sixth World Congress of the Communist International ("Comintern") and was elected to various committees and commissions. Back in Germany, in 1929 he was accepted to the national leadership of the party's recently established Revolutionary Trades Union Opposition ("Revolutionäre Gewerkschafts Opposition"), intended as the basis for an alternative communist sponsored trades union movement.

In April 1932, Pietzuch returned to Baden where he resumed his activities as party organiser ("Orgleiter"). Later that year and during much of 1933 he was back in Moscow, this time as an "aspirant student" at the secretive "M-School" ('military training establishment) surrounded by a large partially wooded area fenced about with barbed wire at Bakovka (Kuntsevo), some 20 miles to the west of central Moscow. Here he was identified by the code name "Artur".

=== Hitler years, resistance and exile ===
In January 1933, the Hitler government took power and lost little time in transforming Germany into a one-party state dictatorship. Sources are vague on the timelines of Pietzuch's actions over the next few years, but during or before the first part of 1934 he was back in Germany, with instructions from comrades to organise communist sabotage and terror activities. According to court documents prepared for a trial in 1940 (which would never take place because Pietzuch was by that time permanently abroad) over the next few years Pietzuch recruited a significant number of activists who were involved in courier work, passing messages and distributing political publications, or entrusted with "special tasks".

In 1936, with Gestapo surveillance becoming increasingly ubiquitous, Pietzuch left Germany and, like many resistance activists at this time, headed for Prague. Here he was arrested and detained on charges of espionage offences against the Czechoslovak state. Release soon followed, however, and he made his way back to Moscow.

At the beginning of 1937 Pietzuch returned to Berlin where he participated with fellow activists in the preparation of violent measures targeting the state. By 2 April 1937 he was living secretly with Karl and Eleonore Bartel in their apartment at Kurfürstenstraße 74 in the city centre. That morning he was at the Kitchen stove conducting experiments with explosives, with a view to the larger scale manufacture of bombs and detonators for use in sabotage actions. Unexpectedly, his experiments triggered a large explosion. The entire kitchen area was destroyed along with half of the living room. Much of the detail surrounding the event comes from the prosecution documents prepared two years later for the trial of the (by that time) widow Eleonore Bartel (and others) dated 20 October 1939: the information must be presumed to have been obtained through interrogation of members and fringe associates of the "Apparat Pietzuch". The explosion caused Pitzuch serious facial injuries. His right hand was also badly damaged.

While a local policeman came in to investigate, Pietzuch was able to hide successfully. The policeman then went off to assemble some colleague for a more thorough search of the apartment: by the time they all arrived Pietzuch had left the building. The extent of Pietzuch's network of contacts now became apparent. Eleonore Bartel bandaged up his injured arm with a dish cloth and he set off in a taxi to Berlin-Schöneberg where the dentistry practice Ingelath-Geerken provided a certain level of first aid and patched up his damaged face. He then visited first one and then a second Jewish physician, Dr. Zuckermann and Dr. Silberstein. For his own "security reasons", Pietzuch was unable to attend a public hospital and was therefore restricted to "private" doctors at this time of need. After his most urgent medical needs had been attended to, he moved on to Schwinemündestraße 21 in Berlin-Wedding another district of central Berlin, where he visited another trusted associate, the electrician Herbert Nicolai. The electrician provided money and a set of false identity papers, armed with which Emil Pietzuch headed for the railway station. Still on the day of that explosion, shortly before midnight, he caught a scheduled train to Prague. As far as is known he would never see Germany again.

=== Final exile ===
Prague at this time had become a third informal capital (along with Moscow and Paris) for the exiled German Communist Party. Pietzuch remained there for nearly two years, during which time the German-speaking borderlands of Czechoslovakia ("Sudetenland") were incorporated into Nazi Germany with French and English agreement. As far as can be determined Pietzuch held no formal position within the party during this period. Party reports indicate that he was not trusted by party comrades as far back as 1936. There is reference to his having made approaches to party members without liaising with party leaders, and there was indeed mention (which at this stage came to nothing) of quietly excluding him from party membership. It was only in March 1939, with the German military taek-over of the rest of Czechoslovakia, that Pietzuch left Prague, from where he now moved back to the Soviet Union. For reasons that remain unclear the German authorities became convinced that Pietzuch had made his way from Czechoslovakia not to Russia but to England. In 1940 his name was included on the "Sonderfahndungsliste G.B" which listed British residents to be prioritized for discovery and arrest by Nazi paramilitaries following a successful German invasion of the islands.

It is likely that the mistrust of comrades which had been apparent in Prague will have followed him to Moscow where he fell foul of the Stalin Purges which were intensively focused on German political exiles in Moscow in response to the sudden invasion in June 1941 of the Soviet Union by German forces in defiance of the non-aggression pact negotiated and concluded between the dictator-states two years earlier. On 22 June 1941, Emil Pietzuch was arrested by the homeland security services. He faced trial on 4 December 1943 and was sentenced to five year's loss of liberty. He did not survive his detention, and indeed probably died at the hands of the Gulag in 1943.
