= Placide Tempels =

Belgian Franciscan missionary

The Reverend Placide Tempels OFM
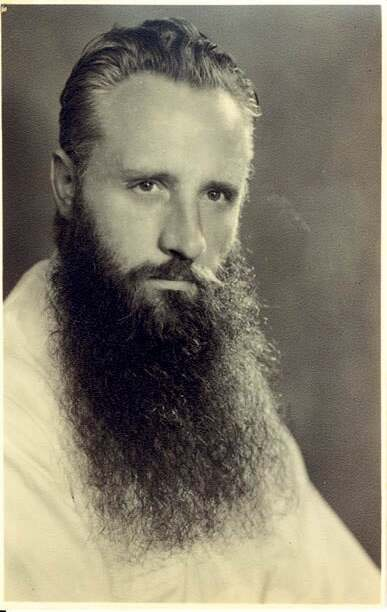
- Born: Frans Tempels; 18 February 1906; Berlaar, Belgium
- Died: 9 October 1977 (aged 71); Hasselt, Belgium
- Occupations: missionary, writer

Placide Frans Tempels, OFM (18 February 1906 – 9 October 1977) was a Belgian Franciscan missionary in the Congo who became famous for his book Bantu Philosophy.

== Life ==
Tempels was born in Berlaar, Belgium. Born Frans Tempels, he took the name "Placide" on his entry into a Franciscan seminary in 1924. After his ordination to the priesthood in 1930 he taught for a short time in Belgium before being posted to the Belgian Congo (now the Democratic Republic of the Congo) in 1933. He stayed there for twenty-nine years, broken by only two short stays back in Belgium. In April 1962 he returned to live in a Franciscan monastery in Hasselt, where he died in 1977.

== Bantu Philosophy ==
Though neither African nor a philosopher, Tempels had a huge influence on African philosophy through the publication in 1945 of his book La philosophie bantoue, published in the English language in 1959 as Bantu Philosophy.

== Philosophie bantoue ==
Also in 1945, Philosophie bantoue was published by Father Placide Tempels and immediately triggered a voracious debate among African philosophers, including Alexis Kagame and Mubabinge Bilolo. Paulin Hountondji critiqued Tempels' ideas as ethnophilosophy and as such within the mainstream tradition of functionalist ethnographic study of Africa and its peoples.
