= Fred Long =

Australian rules footballer

Personal information
- Full name: Frederick Charles Long
- Born: 27 May 1896; Mortlake, Victoria
- Died: 9 October 1977 (aged 81); Camberwell, Victoria
- Original team: Tooronga Juniors

Playing career^{1}
Years	Club	Games (Goals)
1921–22	Melbourne	6 (0)
1922	Hawthorn (VFA)	1 (0)
- ^{1} Playing statistics correct to the end of 1922.

Frederick Charles Long (27 May 1896 – 9 October 1977) was an Australian rules footballer who played with Melbourne in the Victorian Football League (VFL).
