= Onni Rantasalo =

Finnish politician

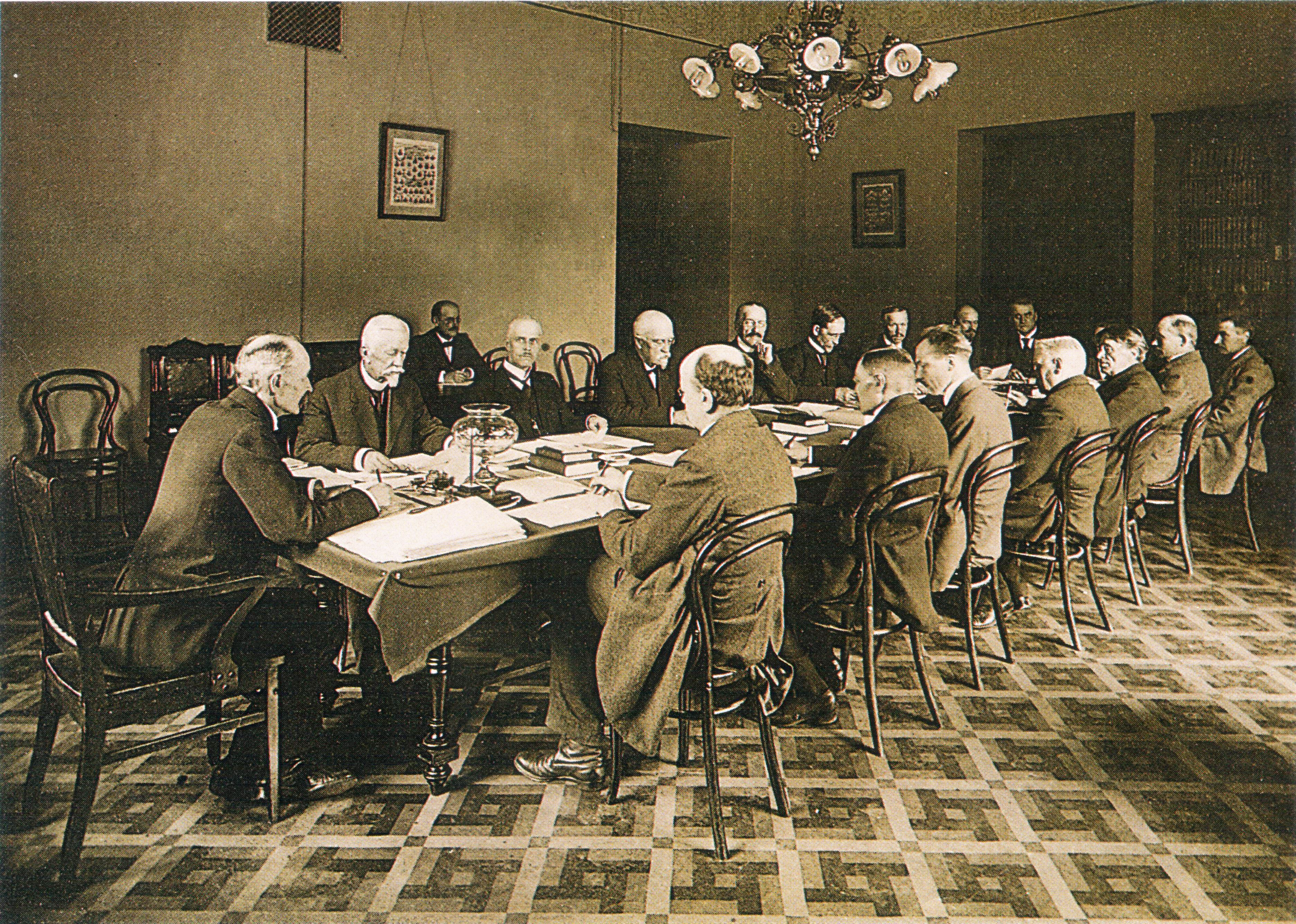

Oiva Onni Rantasalo (28 April 1883 in Eura – 14 October 1977; surname until 1906 Björni) was a Finnish landowner and politician. He was a Member of the Parliament of Finland, representing the Finnish Party from 1917 to 1918 and the National Coalition Party from 1918 to 1919.
