= Sara Alpern =

Professor of United States history

- Other name: Sara Alpern-Tarlow

Academic background
- Education: University of Maryland
- Thesis: A woman of The Nation: Freda Kirchwey (1979)

Sara Alpern is an American academic, who was a professor of history at Texas A&M University where she is known for her work on women's history, especially suffrage, eating disorders in women, and women in management.

== Education and career ==
Alpern studied at Western Reserve University and the University of California at Los Angeles. She earned her Ph.D. from the University of Maryland in 1978. She began teaching at Texas A&M in 1979, first as an assistant professor and she was promoted to associate professor in 1988.

From 1991 until 1993 she was the president of the Women’s Faculty Network at Texas A&M.

== Selected publications ==
- Alpern, Sara (1987). Freda Kirchwey, A Woman of the Nation. Harvard University Press. ISBN 0674318285.
- Alpern, Sara (1992). The Challenge of Feminist Biography. Urbana: University of Illinois Press. ISBN 978-0-252-06292-6.
- Alpern, Sara (2005). "Harriet Williams Russell Strong: Inventor and California Businesswoman Extraordinaire". Southern California Quarterly of the Historical Society of Southern California. 87 (3): 223–268. doi:10.2307/41172270. JSTOR 41172270 – via online.ucpress.edu.
- Alpern-Tarlow, Sara (January 29, 2020). How Can I Change That? The Story of Advertising Woman Dorothy Dignam. Independently published. ISBN 979-8600300033.
