= Josef Peskoller =

Austrian activist and politician (1896–1977)

Josef Peskoller (August 19, 1896 – October 29, 1977) was an Austrian railway worker, resistance activist and Communist Party (KPÖ) politician. Peskoller and his wife Maria organized resistance activities during World War II. Josef suffered periods of imprisonment both during Austrofascism and after Anschluß, whilst Maria was executed after a Gestapo raid in 1944. After the war, Josef Peskoller was elected to the Carinthian Landtag (state parliament).

== Youth ==
Josef Peskoller was born in Lienz on August 19, 1896. He grew up in a railway worker family and began working at the Southern Railway in 1913. He served with the Tyrolean Kaiserjäger during World War I. Upon his return from military service in 1918, he rejoined the railways. Peskoller joined the Social Democratic Workers Party of Austria (SDAPÖ) in 1920, and would remain a member until 1934.

== Marriage and move to Villach ==
Peskoller married Maria Greil, who hailed from an East Tyrolean conservative background, in 1928. The marriage ceremony took place in the St. Nicholas Church in Villach, after a priest had refused to officiate the wedding on political grounds. The couple had two daughters, Helga and Roswitha. In 1932, the family moved to Villach.

== 1934 uprising and aftermath ==
Peskoller fought in the 1934 February Uprising on the side of the Republikanischer Schutzbund. After its defeat, Peskoller was sentenced to three months imprisonment and forced to resign from the Federal Railways. Peskoller joined the KPÖ in the mid-1930s.

Persecuted during the Austrofascist period, between 1934 and 1938 he spent over two years in prisons in Villach, Lienz and Klagenfurt. During 1935–1936, he was imprisoned for eight months at the Wöllersdorf detention camp.

During these years he was also unemployed for lengthy periods. The Peskoller household struggled to make ends meet, and Maria took up various tailoring and household jobs to secure some income.

== Anschluß and resistance organization ==
After the general amnesty in 1938, he was able to regain his employment at the railways but after Anschluß he was again dismissed and worked as a night porter at Hotel Mosser in Villach.

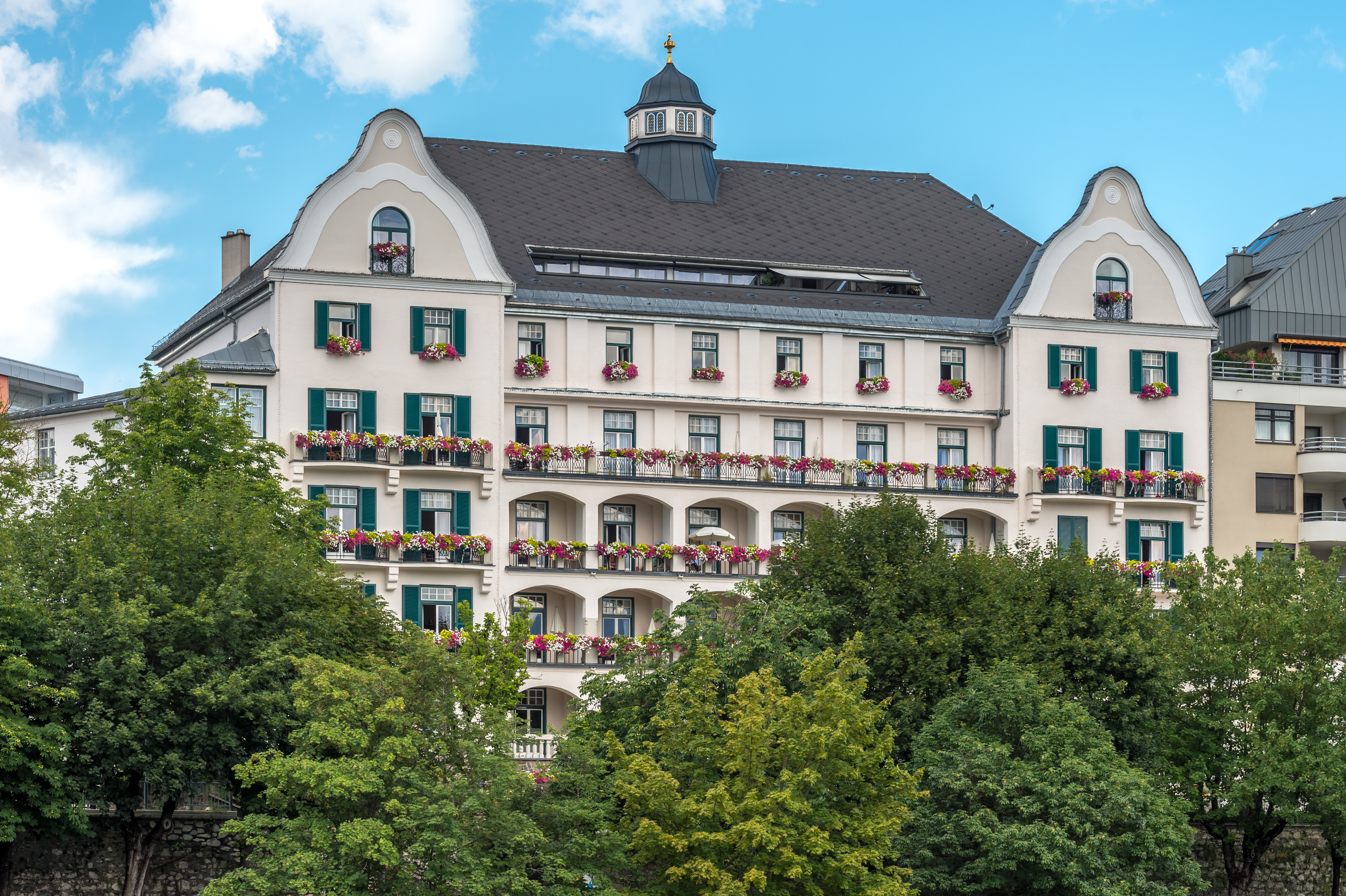
Hotel Mosser, Villach

The Peskoller household at Sonnenstrasse 18 in Villach became an organizational hub for communist resistance activities, Josef played a key role in organizing the group. He was arrested again in 1940 and sentenced to three years in prison. His family continued to suffer economic hardship. With her husband in jail, Maria organized resistance activities along with a few friends – this group of women in Villach helped army deserters and escaped forced labourers to hide, spread propaganda and maintained contacts with Slovenian and Styrian partisans. Josef Peskoller was arrested again in May 1944. In November 1944 a Gestapo raid broke up the Villach resistance group. Maria, her two daughters, then aged 15 and 13, and other members of the resistance group were arrested after having been under surveillance for a lengthy period and following citizens' denunciations. The president of the People's Court in Berlin, Roland Freisler, went to Klagenfurt to conduct the trial. On December 18, 1944, Maria and seven others were sentenced to death. Maria was executed on December 23, 1944, in Graz.

== Post-war years ==
After the war Josef was an employees' representative for the railway workers of the Villach area. He was elected to the Carinthian state parliament (landtag) in 1945, one of three KPÖ deputies in Carinthia and one of 15 KPÖ state parliament deputies across Austria. In the Carinthian state parliament the KPÖ deputies took an opposition role, and abstained in the election of state president and state government. Peskoller was a state parliament deputy between December 10, 1945, to November 7, 1949. He stood as a candidate for the Left Bloc in the October 1949 Austrian legislative election in the 24th constituency.

Peskoller was elected to the Villach municipal council in 1953 as a 'People's Opposition' candidate.

For some 30 years, until his health severely deteriorated, Peskoller was an official of the KZ-Verband. Josef Peskoller died on October 29, 1977.
