= Maurice Willmott =

Sir Maurice Gordon Willmott MC (25 February 1894 – 14 October 1977) was Chief Chancery Master in the High Court of Justice. He retired in 1959. He was the holder of the Military Cross.
