= Josef Håkestad =

Norwegian footballer (1907-1977)

Personal information
- Date of birth: 25 August 1907
- Date of death: 25 October 1977 (aged 70)

International career
Years	Team	Apps	(Gls)
1935	Norway	2	(0)

Josef Håkestad (25 August 1907 – 25 October 1977) was a Norwegian footballer. He played in two matches for the Norway national football team in 1935.
