= Hayrullah Örs =

- Born: 1901; Ottoman Empire
- Died: 6 October 1977; Istanbul, Turkey
- Education: Istanbul University Faculty of Letters, Department of Philosophy
- Occupations: Educator, musician, writer, translator

Hayrullah Örs (1901 – 6 October 1977, Istanbul) was a Turkish educator, musician, writer, translator and Freemason. After graduating from the Department of Philosophy at the Istanbul University Faculty of Letters, he made important contributions to the field of education. Örs also conducted studies in philosophy and literature and lived a life closely connected with literary and intellectual activities.

In addition to his authorship, Örs is particularly known for his translations that helped build cultural bridges between Western and Eastern traditions. He also played an important role in translating the letters written by Helmuth von Moltke about Turkey into Turkish.

Örs was also interested in music and contributed to various musical projects. Through his work in multiple artistic and intellectual fields, he became a recognized figure both in Turkey and internationally.

== Works ==
- İlk Okulda Kağıt ve Karton İşleri (Paper and Cardboard Works in Primary School) (1943)
- Nasıl Hareket Ediyoruz (How We Move) (1943)
- Küçük Elektrikçi (The Little Electrician) (1944)
- Duyum (Sensation) (1945)
- İlk ve Orta Okullarda Ağaç İşleri (Woodwork in Primary and Secondary Schools) (1951)
- Ağaç İşleri (Woodwork) (with İ. Hakkı Uludağ) (1952)
- Belediyenin Gelişmesi ve Üremesi (1952)
- Konfiçyus (Confucius) (1964)
- Musa ve Yahudilik (Moses and Judaism) (1966)
- Bazı Meşhur Masonlar (Some Famous Freemasons) (2007)

== Translations ==
- Xenophon – Anabasis (1930)
- Rudyard Kipling – Rikki-Tikki-Tavi (1935)
- Seydi Ali Reis – From India to Istanbul (with N. Özön) (1935)
- Friedhold Morf – Cardboard Work and Bookbinding (1938)
- G. Schütte-Lihotzky – An Essay on New Village School Building Types (1939)
- Jack London – The Call of the Wild / Wolf Attack (1944)
- Arrian – Anabasis of Alexander (1944)
- Titus Maccius Plautus – The Rope (1945)
- Heinrich von Kleist – The Broken Jug (1945)
- Joseph Viktor von Scheffel – Ekkehard (with Şaziye Berin Kurt) (1949)
- Georg Stehli – Animal Collecting (1948)
- Richard von Volkmann – The Golden Girl (1948)
- Selma Lagerlöf – Gösta Berling (1949)
- Selma Lagerlöf – Gösta Berling II (with Behiç Enver Koryak) (1949)
- Arrian – Anabasis of Alexander II (1949)
- Hans Christian Andersen – The Snow Queen (1943)
- Selma Lagerlöf – The Wonderful Adventures of Nils (1951)
- Heinrich Wölfflin – Principles of Art History (1951)
- Selma Lagerlöf – Between Heaven and Earth (1952)
- Selma Lagerlöf – Jerusalem: The Heart of History (1953)
- Kari Baumann – Teaching Physics and Chemistry in German Public Schools (1956)
- Wilhelm Fröhlich – Learning Technical Machinery (1957)
- Wilhelm Fröhlich – Learning Radio (1961)
- Wilhelm Fröhlich – Learning Optics and Photography (1961)
- Wilhelm Fröhlich – Learning Electricity by Doing (1961)
- Wilhelm Fröhlich – Learning Chemistry (1962)
- Epicurus – Letters and Maxims (1962)
- Xenophon – Symposium and the Apology of Socrates (1962)
- M. Walter – Studies of the Near Homeland (1963)
- William Montgomery Watt – Muhammad (1963)
- Heinrich Böll – When the War Ended (1966)
- Gotthold Ephraim Lessing – Nathan the Wise (1966)
- Shmuel Yosef Agnon – A Guest for the Night (1966)
- Sigrid Hunke – Allah’s Sun over Europe (1969)
- Helmuth von Moltke – Moltke's Letters from Turkey (1969)
- C. W. Ceram – Gods, Graves and Scholars (1969)
- Selma Lagerlöf – Waiting for Happiness (1969)
- Sholem Aleichem – Tevye the Dairyman (1970)
- Walther Kiaulehn – Iron Angels (1970)
- Bertrand Russell – The Problems of Philosophy (1970)
- Walther Kiaulehn – History of Technology (1971)
- Gotthard Jäschke – Islam in the New Turkey (1971)
- Selma Lagerlöf – Thumbelina’s Journey in Sweden (2007)

== Sources ==
- Remzi Yayınları - Hayrullah Örs Biyografisi
- Mason Derneği - Hayrullah Örs Biyografisi
- Biyografya - Hayrullah Örs
- Translex Ege Üniversitesi - Hayrullah Örs
