= Giosuè Fioriti =

Italian footballer

Personal information
- Date of birth: 3 May 1989 (age 37)
- Place of birth: Gubbio, Italy
- Height: 1.76 m (5 ft 9 1/2 in)
- Position: Forward

Team information
- Current team: A.S. Gualdo Calcio

Senior career*
Years	Team	Apps	(Gls)
2007–2008	A.S. Gubbio 1910	1	(0)
2008–2009	Fontanelle Branca Calcio	?	(?)
2009–	A.S. Gualdo Calcio	3	(0)
- * Club domestic league appearances and goals as of December 4, 2009

Giosuè Fioriti (born 3 May 1989, in Gubbio) is an Italian football forward who currently plays for A.S. Gualdo Calcio.

== Appearances on Italian Series ==
Serie C2 : 1 App

Eccellenza : 3 Apps

Total : 4 Apps

== See also ==
- Football in Italy
- List of football clubs in Italy
