= Anita Alpern =

American Internal Revenue Service Official (1920–2006)

Anita F. Alpern (February 18, 1920 in New York City – October 31, 2006 in Silver Spring, Maryland) was an assistant commissioner of the Internal Revenue Service. At the time of her retirement in the late 1970s, she was the highest ranking woman in the federal career service.

Alpern received her degree at the University of Wisconsin and did graduate work in public administration at Columbia University before moving to Washington, D.C. during World War II. She entered the federal workforce as a labor market economist in the Department of Labor. Later she held a position as a systems research and management analyst at the Defense Department, before moving on to the IRS in the Treasury Department in 1960.

At the IRS, Alpern was one of the first eight women to be appointed to a GS-18 level and the first woman appointed an assistant commissioner in the Treasury Department. She was one of six in 1975 to receive the Federal Woman's Award, and in 1985, she was the first woman to receive the President's Award from the Washington chapter of the American Society for Public Administration.

After she retired from federal service, Alpern became a professor at American University where she supervised the School of Public Affairs' internship program. She was credited with the school's success in placing an exceptional number of graduates in the Presidential Management Fellows Program.

== External links/references ==
- Obituary, November 6, 2006, Washington Post.
