= Marion Sénones =

French painter, illustrator and traveler

- Born: Marcelle Borne-Kreutzberger; 8 June 1886; Neuilly-sur-Seine, France
- Died: 3 October 1977 (aged 91); Rabat, Morocco
- Known for: Painting, design

Marion Sénones (born Marcelle Borne; 8 June 1886 – 3 October 1977), was a French painter, illustrator and traveler.

== Biography ==
Born in Neuilly-sur-Seine near Paris, in a wealthy family with two sisters and a brother, their father was accidentally killed shortly after her birth. When her mother remarried Capt. Kreutzberger, she took the name Marcelle Borne-Kreutzberger. She spent her childhood and early years in Rennes, France where she learned design and painting at the School of Fine Arts. In 1917 she moved to Paris where she became editorial secretary of several publications, including L’Europe nouvelle and Ève.

In 1931, she met traveler and ethnologist Odette du Puigaudeau and the pair would remain together for the rest of their lives. In 1933, the artist assumed the pseudonym Marion Sénones, apparently at the urging of Puigaudeau. The two women spent several years doing field work with the nomads of western Sahara, specifically Mauritania. Sénones illustrated many of Puigaudeau's works.

Sénones died in 1977 in Rabat, Morocco.

== Selected publications ==
- Odette du Puigaudeau, avec 31 dessins dans le texte de Marion Sénones, 22 illustrations hors texte et sept cartes, La piste Maroc-Sénégal, Plon, 1954.
- Odette du Puigaudeau, illustré de 30 croquis de route de Marion Sénones, de 46 photographies de l'auteur et de 2 cartes, couverture de Chas Boré, La route de l'ouest (Maroc-Mauritanie, Éditions J.Susse, 1945.
- Odette du Puigaudeau, illustré de 25 croquis de route de Marion Sénones, de 24 photographies de l'auteur et de 3 cartes. Tagant (Mauritanie), Julliard, 1949.
- Odette du Puigaudeau, Marion Sénones, Gravures rupestres du Hank (Sahara Marocain), Bulletin de la Société préhistorique de France, vol. 36, n°11, 1939, pp. 437–453.
- Odette du Puigaudeau, Marion Sénones, Le Cimetière de Bir'Umm Garn, Journal de la Société des africanistes, vol. 17, n°1, 1947, pp. 51–56.
- Odette du Puigaudeau, « Gravures rupestres de la Montagne d'Icht (Sud Marocain), Journal de la Société des africanistes, vol. 11, n°1, 1941, pp. 147–156.
- Sénones, Marion, Odette du Puigaudeau, Gravures rupestres de la Vallée moyenne du Draa (Sud Marocain) Journal de la Société des africanistes, vol. 11, n°1, 1941, pp. 157–168.
- Senones Marion, Odette du Puigaudeau, Vestiges préislamiques de la région d'Assa, Journal de la Société des africanistes, vol. 22, n°1, 1952, pp. 7–15.
- Sénones, Marion, Odette du Puigaudeau, Peintures rupestres du Tagant (Mauritanie), Journal de la Société des africanistes, vol. 9, n°1, 1939, pp. 43–70.
