= Mort Hill =

American basketball player (1922–1977)

Personal information
- Born: October 24, 1922 Los Angeles, California, U.S.
- Died: October 6, 1977 (aged 54) Orange County, California, U.S.

Career information
- High school: Herbert Hoover (Glendale, California)
- College: Glendale CC (1940–1941); UC Santa Barbara (1941–1943)
- Position: Guard

Career history
- 1945–1947: St. Louis Blues
- 1947: Syracuse Nationals
- 1946–1948: Worcester

Mortimer Crenshaw Hill (October 24, 1922 – October 6, 1977) was an American professional basketball guard who spent one season in the National Basketball League (NBL) as a member of the Syracuse Nationals during the 1946–47 season.
