= George Jensen =

American artist (1878–1977)

Jensen c. 1900

George Jensen (August 9, 1878 – October 4, 1977) was an artist of Danish descent born in Port Clinton, Ohio. Jensen was best known for his Midwest and New England landscape and seascape oil paintings as well as for his artistic versatility producing numerous works from water colors to linoleum block. Jensen often traveled to Michigan (Saline, Marquette, Presque Isle), New York, Pennsylvania, Ohio, West Virginia, and Massachusetts (Cape Cod, Provincetown) and compiled sketches which he would later transcribe to canvas. The Upper Peninsula of Michigan is where he would paint seascapes of black rocks and waves that would "wash 15 feet high" off Lake Superior.

After graduating from high school in Port Clinton, Jensen attended the Ohio Business College in Sandusky, Ohio, and from there the Zanerian Art College in Columbus, Ohio. Jensen studied under several of America's finest artists including; John F. Carlson (Impressionist - Woodstock, New York), George Elmer Brown (Cape Cod, Massachusetts), Albert H. Krebrial (Chicago Institute of Art in Saugatuck, Michigan), and Carl Gaertner (Cleveland Institute of Art, Cleveland, Ohio). When Jensen was in his 80s he continued to paint and travel, taking road trips around the United States. Jensen was a self-proclaimed conservative artist whose collection includes no duplicates.

== Career ==
Painting by American artist George Jensen (Toledo, OH).

Jensen's artwork has been exhibited in a number of large cities throughout the United States; most notably Toledo, Ohio, where he was credited to have "been an important figure in the cultural life of the city". Jensen, best known for his oil paintings, began his art career in watercolor, linoleum block, as well as pen and ink. In 1912, he became one of the first artists to host a solo-exhibition at the Toledo Museum of Art one year after the building opened on Monroe St. in Toledo, Ohio. Jensen participated in exhibitions in a number of museums including the Brooklyn Museum of Art (1932, 1936), Detroit Artist's Exhibit (Detroit, Michigan), the Butler Institute of American Art (Youngstown, Ohio), the Columbus Museum of Art (Columbus, Ohio) and the Fort Wayne Museum of Art (Fort Wayne, Indiana). Other US cities where George Jensen's art has been exhibited include: Sylvania, Ohio; Bowling Green, Ohio; Philadelphia, Pennsylvania; New York, New York; Cleveland, Ohio; Minneapolis, Minnesota; and others. In addition to painting and teaching, for 20 years Jensen worked commercially as an artist for Jennison-Wright, Willys-Overland, Conklin Pen Co., Medbury-Ward Co, Webb C. Ball Co, as well as many other national publications. However, as the depression slowed commercial progress, Jensen kept busy by shifting focus to landscape and seascape art which he preferred. In 1954, he celebrated the 40th anniversary of his first "one-man art show" held at the Toledo Museum shortly after the building was constructed with an additional exhibit of 20 paintings held at the Toledo Museum of Art. Jensen was a member of a number of prominent artist groups including the Scandinavian Art Society of New York, the Society of Independent Artists, the Toledo Artists Club (lifetime member). By 1962, he had contributed works to the Saturday Evening Post, Time, the Ladies Home Journal, and a host of trade journals. By 1963, the Toledo Area Artist group had sponsored 45 annual art exhibitions to nearly all of which Jensen contributed.

Jensen retired from commercial advertising in 1944 but continued to paint and teach art courses for many individuals in a number of northern Ohio cities until a year before his death at the age of 99. Jensen was recognized in the Who Was Who book of American Art in 1985 and 1989, as well as other peer-reviewed art publications.

== Awards ==
Jensen received first awards for his oil paintings in 1930 and 1931 from the Toledo Federation of Art Societies. In 1953, he won honorable mention for contributions made to the Williams County Fair in Montpelier, Ohio. In 1962, he won second prize for an oil painting as well as the Popular Award at the Bowling Green Fair. On May 25, 1966, Jensen received the "Honorary Award and Life Membership" from the Toledo Artists Club. He was invited to a "Meet the Artist" party at the Max Pochapin Hall of Art in New York City, where they celebrated the sale of the Hall's 10,000th painting. In observance of his 90th and 91st birthdays, Jensen was honored by his art students in for his teaching and artistic contributions in Perrysburg, Ohio. In March and April 1975 Jensen was honored at the age of 96 by area artists via regional publication. Later in 1975, he was honored at the age of 97 in Sylvania, Ohio for his 60 years as a prominent artist and teacher.

== Public contribution and teaching ==
Jensen taught art courses to hundreds of people as well as led public painting demonstrations and chaired several art departments in several northern Ohio cities. In 1945, four art enthusiasts (Herb Mumford, John Blum, Kemp Dereen, and Charlie Green) formed the OnIzed Art Club and soon after sought Jensen for expertise and instruction in art and paint methodology. In 1947, Jensen provided instruction to artists during the Second Annual Exhibition of Paintings and Drawings held by the Dorwood OnIzed Art Club. He taught in the Toledo Museum of Art as well as instructed privately over 150 students many of whom contributed art to exhibitions. Jensen often donated art to community organizations including the Bethel Lutheran Church in Toledo (where he was a member) and the Magruder Memorial Hospital in Port Clinton, OH.

== Family ==
Jensen was father to three children: Georgana Bauman, Elliot Jensen and Clifford Jensen, and grandfather to Jon Jensen, Julia Jensen, Barbara Bauman, Donald Bauman, and Ronald Bauman, who carries on his grandfather's artistic tradition.
