= George Green (footballer, born 1891) =

English footballer (1891-1958)

Personal information
- Full name: George Green
- Date of birth: 1891
- Place of birth: Dartford, England
- Date of death: 9 November 1958 (aged 67)
- Place of death: Crayford, England
- Height: 6 ft 0 in (1.83 m)
- Position: Full-back

Senior career*
Years	Team	Apps	(Gls)
–	Northfleet United		
1914–1919	Southampton	21	(0)
1919–19??	Northfleet United		
- * Club domestic league appearances and goals

George Green (1891 – 9 November 1958) was a professional footballer who played at full-back for Southampton in the period prior to the First World War.

== Football career ==
Green was born in Crayford in north-west Kent and started his football career with Northfleet United, playing in the Kent League. By 1914, he had attracted attention from several clubs, including Derby County and Fulham of the Football League, and Brighton and Southampton of the Southern League.

He signed for Southampton in April 1914, and made his debut at right-back in a 2–1 defeat at Northampton on 18 April, the penultimate match of the 1913–14 season, filling in for the injured Fred Smith. Following Smith's retirement in the summer of 1914, Green became the established right-back, playing in the first twelve matches of the 1914–15 season, before losing his place to Jack Small in November, although he returned to the side in March.

Described as "an outstanding full-back, neat in style and quick off the mark", Green was expected to go far in the game, but his career was interrupted by the outbreak of World War I, bringing the end of normal football in 1915. The "Saints" retained his registration during the war and he returned to the club in 1918, making a few appearances in the wartime leagues.

In 1919, Green decided to return to Kent and Southampton agreed to release him. He re-signed for Northfleet United and helped them win the Kent League title in 1919–20.

== Honours ==
Northfleet United

- Kent League champions: 1919–20
