= George Clayton Abel =

Member of Royal Canadian Air Force air crew

George Clayton Abel GM
- Born: 1909; Saskatchewan, Canada
- Died: October 29, 1977 (aged 68); Vancouver, British Columbia
- Military career
- Branch: Royal Canadian Air Force
- Rank: Flight Lieutenant
- Service number: CanJ7526
- Conflicts: World War II
- Awards: George Medal

George Clayton Abel GM (1909 – October 29, 1977) was a Flight Lieutenant in the Royal Canadian Air Force during World War II. In 1944, he was awarded the George Medal. The citation read:

In November 1943, Flight Lieutenant Abel was a member of the crew of an aircraft detailed for an operational sortie. Shortly after taking off the pilot was compelled to make an emergency landing, and on touching the ground the aircraft burst into flames. The crew, who had taken crash positions, proceeded to leave the aircraft through the emergency exits. Flight Lieutenant Abel, with his companions, had travelled a distance of approximately sixty yards before he realized that one member of the crew, the rear gunner, was missing. The aircraft was blazing furiously and ammunition was exploding. There was also the grave risk of the petrol tanks and the bombs exploding. Flight Lieutenant Abel, ignoring the imminent danger, returned to the aircraft, calling on the other members of the crew to follow him. The rear gunner was discovered trapped in his turret which, together with the exists, had become jammed. Efforts were made to turn the turret but this the rescuers found to be impossible. Flight Lieutenant Abel then smashed the perspex with his bare hands and succeeded in dragging the rear gunner clear of the wreckage. When all were about twenty yards from the aircraft the first bomb exploded, and the aircraft was soon completely destroyed. By his courage and leadership Flight Lieutenant Abel undoubtedly saved his comrade's life at the risk of his own.
