= Albert Gittins =

English cricketer

Albert Edward Gittins (12 September 1897 – 6 October 1977) was an English first-class cricketer who played in two matches for Warwickshire in 1919. He was born in Southport, Lancashire and died in Ladywood, Birmingham.

Gittins, a right-handed lower order batsman and a right-arm medium-pace bowler, was one of several players tried out to fill big gaps in Warwickshire's bowling line-up after the First World War; he played in two games at the end of the 1919 season in which Warwickshire finished bottom of the County Championship. In one of these, the non-Championship game against Worcestershire, he took two wickets for 17 runs in the second innings. In contemporary reports in newspapers and in Wisden Cricketers' Almanack, he is referred to as "Giddings"; CricketArchive states that his name at death was recorded as "Gittings". In newspaper reports in 1920, he was named (as "A. E. Giddings") as one of the new professional cricketers that Warwickshire would be able to call upon in the 1920 season, but in the event he played no further first-class cricket.
