= George Hadley (footballer) =

English footballer (1893–1963)

Personal information
- Full name: George Amos Hadley
- Date of birth: 5 June 1889
- Place of birth: Darlaston, England
- Date of death: 2 November 1954 (aged 65)
- Place of death: Rushall, England
- Height: 5 ft 7 in (1.70 m)
- Position: Half-back

Youth career
- Willenhall Swifts

Senior career*
Years	Team	Apps	(Gls)
1913–1919	Southampton	57	(4)
1919–1920	Aston Villa	4	(0)
1920–1922	Coventry City	72	(3)
- * Club domestic league appearances and goals

George Amos Hadley (5 June 1889 – 2 November 1954) was an English footballer who played at wing-half either side of the First World War.

== Football career ==
Hadley was born in Darlaston, Staffordshire and worked as a press-tool setter with a lock manufacturer while playing football with Willenhall Swifts.

In July 1913, he moved to the south coast to join Southampton of the Southern League. A "stocky, versatile half-back (who) could also play up front", Hadley made his first-team debut in a 2–0 defeat at Reading on 1 November 1913 when he replaced Jim McAlpine at left-half. After four matches, McAlpine was recalled and Hadley switched to right-half where he remained until February when he lost his place to Jack Small. Hadley returned after three matches and ended the season with four matches at inside-left, scoring twice.

The following season, Hadley only missed five matches, generally playing as a wing-half but with the occasional appearance as an outside-forward. By the end of the season, England was at war and normal football was suspended. The "Saints" retained Hadley's registration throughout the war, and he played in the occasional wartime fixture.

After the end of the war, Hadley was sold to Aston Villa of the Football League First Division, for whom he made four appearances before a transfer to Coventry City in July 1920. Hadley remained at City until 1922, when a broken collarbone brought his career to a close.
