= V. K. Govindan Nair =

Indian poet

- Born: 4 February 1903; Thrikkadiri, Palghat, British India
- Died: 15 October 1977 (aged 74)
- Occupation: Poet
- Writing career
- Language: Malayalam

V. K. Govindan Nair (4 February 1903 – 15 October 1977) was a Malayalam poet from Kerala, India. He received the Kerala Sahitya Akademi Award in 1965 for the collection Avil Pothi.

== Biography ==
He was born 1903 in Thrikkadiri near Ottappalam, a part of the present day Palghat district. After completing higher education from Trichur and Tiruchirappalli, he worked in the Madras Government Press as a clerk. He published his first work Avil Pothi at the age of 60, in 1964. A collection of poems based on the puranic story of Sri Krishna and Kuchela, it received the Kerala Sahitya Akademi Award in 1965. His other poetry collections are V. K. Govindan Nairude Krithikal and Muthukal.

== Awards ==
- 1965: Kerala Sahitya Akademi Award for Avil Pothi
- 1975: Odakkuzhal Award for V. K. Govindan Nairude Krithikal
