= Tany Youne =

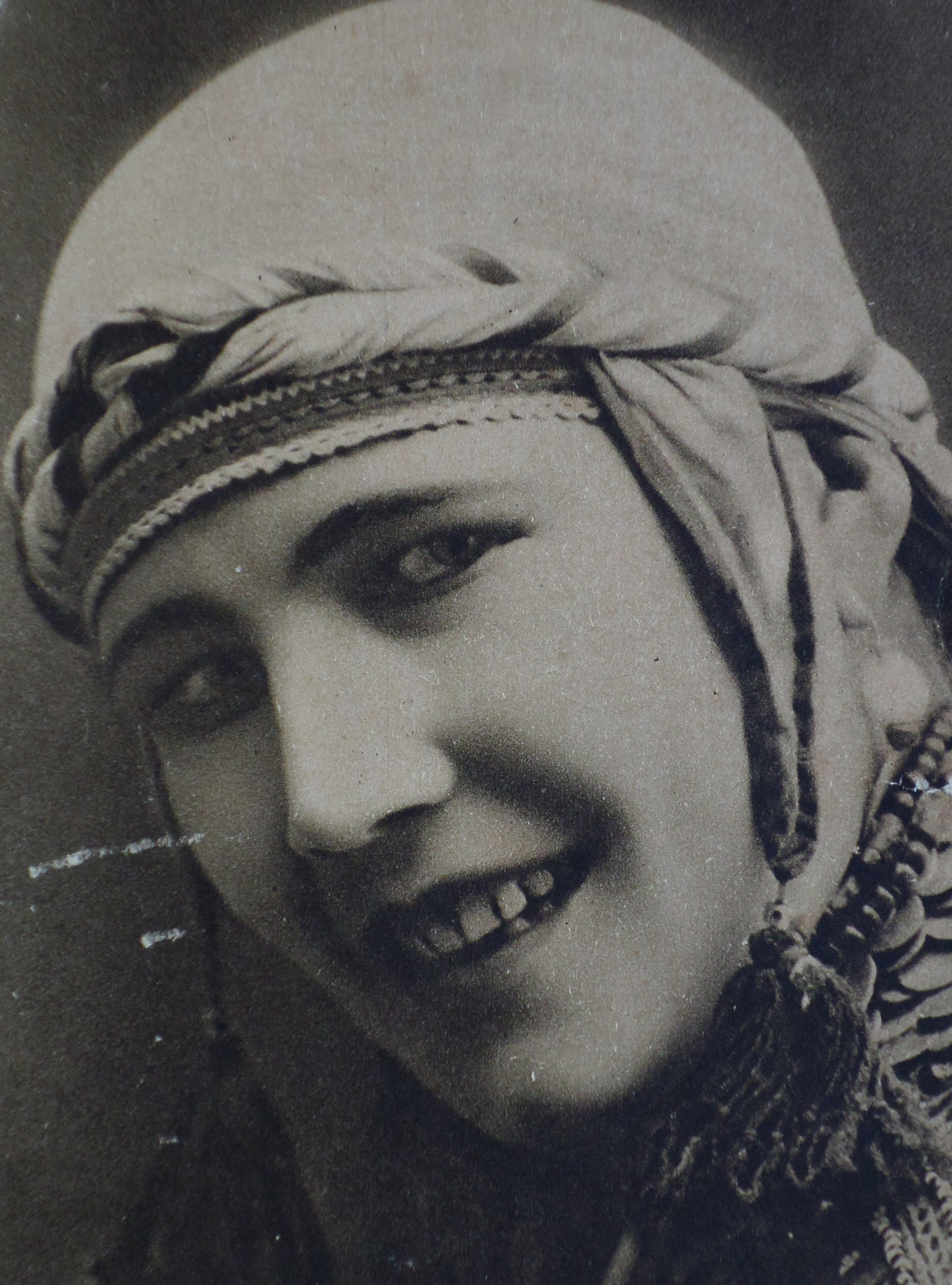
- Born: Tatyana Stepanovna Maksimova; January 28, 1903; Cherby village Chuvash Republic
- Died: October 6, 1977
- Years active: 1935–1977

Tany Youne (born Tatyana Stepanovna Maksimova-Koshkinsky; January 28, 1903; Cherby, Kazan Governorate (now in Yadrinsky District of Chuvash Republic) — October 6, 1977 Cheboksary, Chuvash ASSR) was a Soviet actress and writer. She was one of the first Chuvash film actresses and an outstanding figure of the Chuvash national culture. She was a member of the Union of writers of the USSR (1957).

== Literary and translational activity ==
Since 1935 Tani Youne has started to work over transfer of the best samples of the Russian, Soviet and foreign literature. Together with I. Maksimov-Koshkinsky she has written some plays.

In 1972 she published her memoirs as : Days and years gone by. In the preface she wrote: «I Think … I am happy. Perhaps, not all dreams of my life came true. In my life there were many insults and bitterness. Nevertheless, I am happy! Because I am an actress».

== Awards ==
In 1973 for merits in development of the Chuvash literature and theatrical art and with the 70 anniversary Tany Youne has been awarded by the Certificate of honor republic committee of the CPSU and the Council of Ministers of Chuvash АSSR.

== Literature ==
- Антонов М., "Асран кайми йĕр хăварчĕ", Коммунизм ялавĕ. — 1983. — 28 кăрлач.
- Орлов Г. Актриса, тăлмач / Г. Орлов // Ялав. — 1973. — № 1.
- Родионов Л. "Актриса, тăлмачă, драматург", Коммунизм ялавĕ. — 1973. — 20 нарăс.
- Антонов М., "Тани Юн — первая чувашская киноактриса", Советская Чувашия. — 1993. — 30 янв.
- Игнатьева С., "Прекрасный дьявол" Чебоксарские новости. — 1993. — 28 янв.
- Матвеева Г., "И стали мгновения историей", Советская Чувашия. — 2005. — 23 июля.
- Романова Ф., "Театр, любимый народом", Чебоксары, 1973. — С. 79.
