= Ferdinand du Puigaudeau =

French painter (1864–1930)

- Born: 4 April 1864; Nantes, France
- Died: 19 September 1930 (aged 66); Croisic, France
- Occupation: Painter
- Children: Odette du Puigaudeau

Ferdinand du Puigaudeau (1864-1930) was a French painter. He was born in Nantes on 4 April 1864 and died in Croisic on 19 September 1930.

== Biography ==
As a young boy, du Puigaudeau was close to his uncle Henri de Chateaubriant, who encouraged his artistic pursuits. His education was traditional and he studied at various boarding schools from Paris to Nice. In 1882, du Puigaudeau travelled to Italy, then to Tunisia, and taught himself to paint. The first work that can be safely attributed to du Puigaudeau was dated 1886, the year he visited Pont-Aven where he befriended Charles Laval and Paul Gauguin with whom he decided to travel to Panama and Martinique, but was unable to do so as he was called up for military service. In 1890, he presented one of his works at the Salon of the Société Nationale des Beaux Arts at a time when his father had introduced him to the dealer Paul Durand-Ruel.

He got married on 7 August 1893 in Saint-Nazaire, and had one daughter, the traveler and ethnographer Odette du Puigaudeau. In 1895 he settled down in Pont-Aven for three years. After falling out with Durand-Ruel in 1903, he visited Venice in 1904 where he produced many canvases but subsequently returned to Batz-sur-Mer with serious financial problems. 1907 saw him move into the manor house of Kervaudu in Le Croisic which had been loaned to him by friends. The World War I isolated him from the rest of the world. Degas himself called him "the hermit of Kervaudu" due to his secluded and solitary existence.

In 1919 he began to prepare an exhibition in New York, and worked on it for four years, but it was cancelled at the last minute. This failure had dire repercussions for him and he fell into a state of depression and alcohol abuse. He died on 19 September 1930.

== Du Puigaudeau's paintings depicting scenes in Brittany ==
He painted many Breton scenes and was fascinated with the tradition of the pardon with its processions and rituals, as indeed were many artists over the years. He also favoured painting studies of Breton women. Some paintings are shown below and his fascination with the effects of light are evident in his use of flickering candlelight.

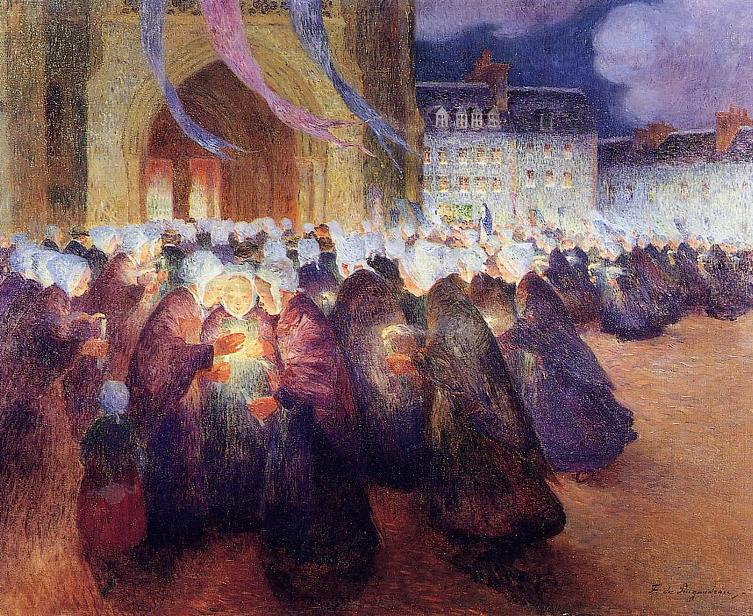
Painting of a nighttime procession at Saint-Pol de Leon

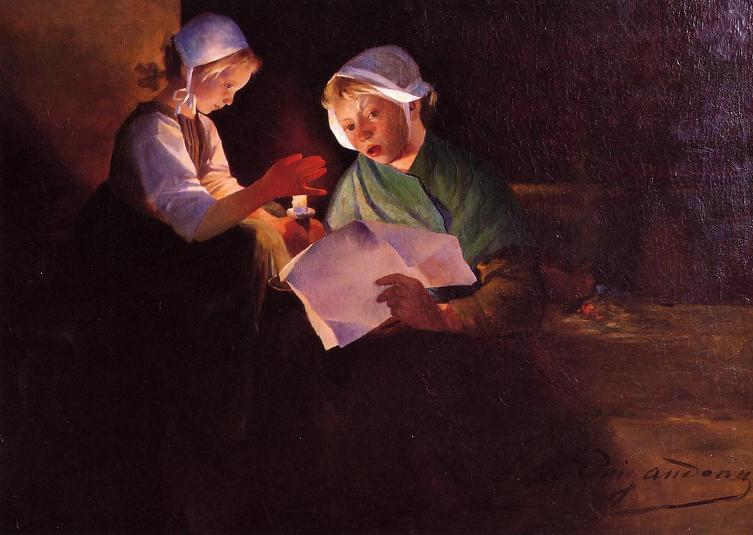
Two Breton girls reading

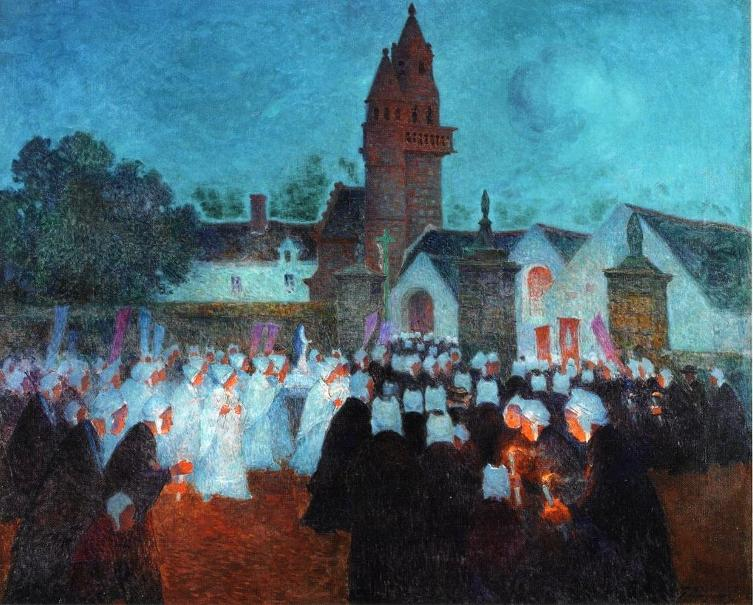
A church procession at Nenvic

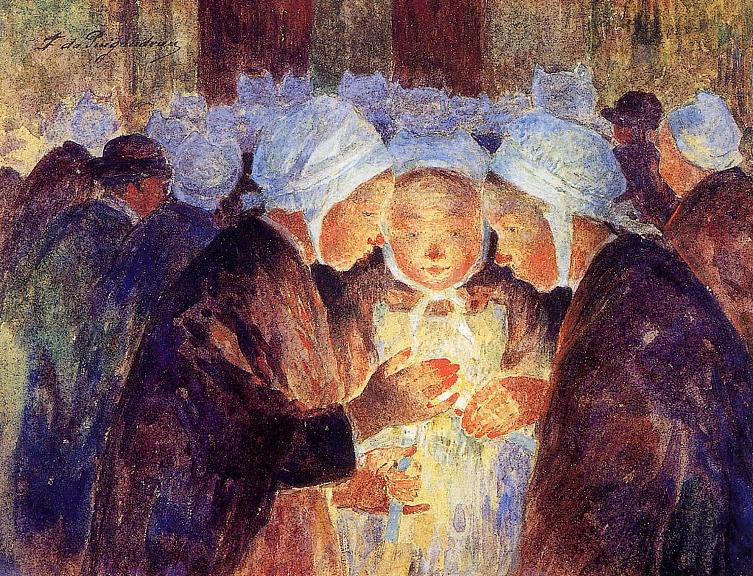
Three Breton girls light candles before a procession. Puigaudeau brilliantly recreates the light from the candles

== Puigaudeau paintings in art galleries/museums ==
Puigaudeau paintings can be seen in the following art museums.

- Indianapolis Museum of Art, Indiana, USA
- Madrid; Thyssen-Bornemisza Museum. This museum hold the painting '"Night Fair at Saint-Pol-de-Leon'" which dates to 1894 to 1898.
- Morlaix; Musée Jacobins, France
- Nantes; Musée des beaux-Arts. Here one can see the painting '"Le Menhir, Pol'"
- Quimper. Musée des beaux-Arts. Here hang "'Paysage à la chaumière"' and "Paysage avec arbres"
- Saint Nazaire; Musée de Saint Nazaire.
- Musée de la Cohue|Musée des beaux-arts in Vannes. Here one can see the paintings '"Clair de lune en Brière" and "Office du soir" or "Calvaire de Rochefort-en-Terre"

== Exhibitions ==
There have been two exhibitions of du Puigaudeau works

- In March- June 1998 at the Musée de Pont-Aven
- In November 1998 to January 1999 at the Musée des Jacobins, Morlaix

== Bibliography ==
- *"Ferdinand du Puigaudeau. Catalogue Raisonné" by Antoine Laurentin. Editions Thierry Salvador, Paris, 1989.
- "Gauguin and the Impressionists at Pont-Aven" by Judy LePaul. Abbeville Press, New York, 1987.

== Notes ==
Other du Puigaudeau works include "Scène nocturne de village breton", "Le calvaire de Rochefort-en-terre ou l’office du soir", "La lanterne magique ou le Czar à Paris-Panorama" and "Le manège nocturne".

== Gallery ==
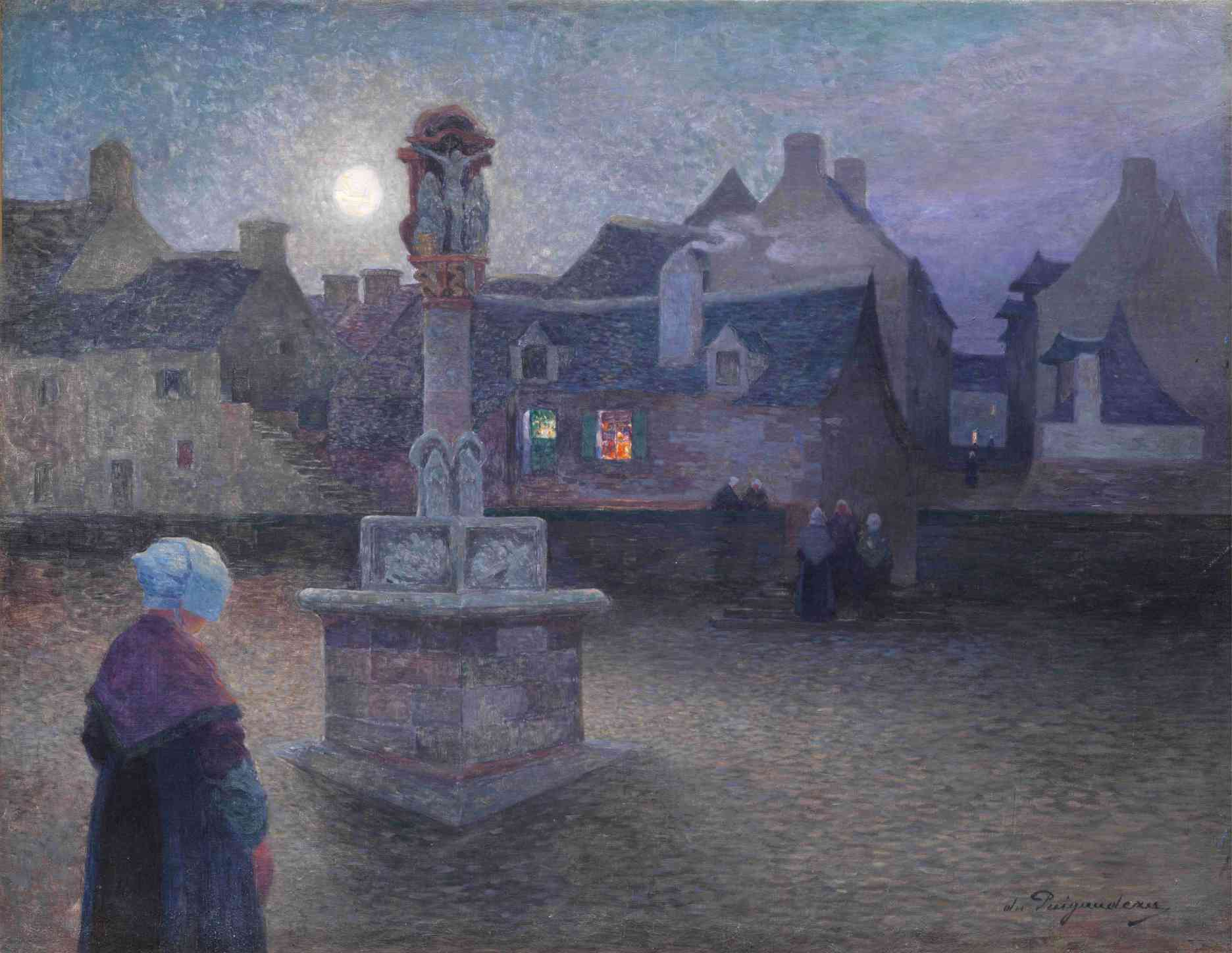
"Calvaire de Rochefort-en-Terre". The Calvary at Rochefort-en-Terre

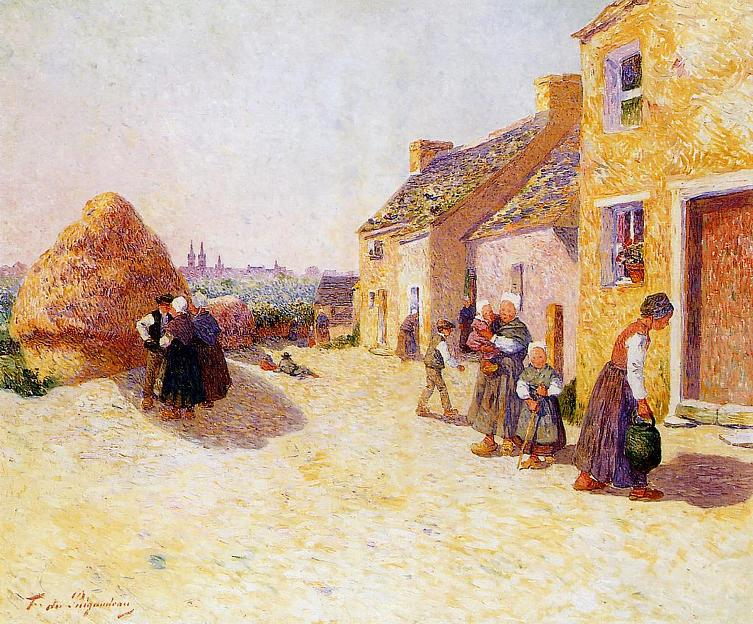
Puigaudeau paints a farmyard scene.

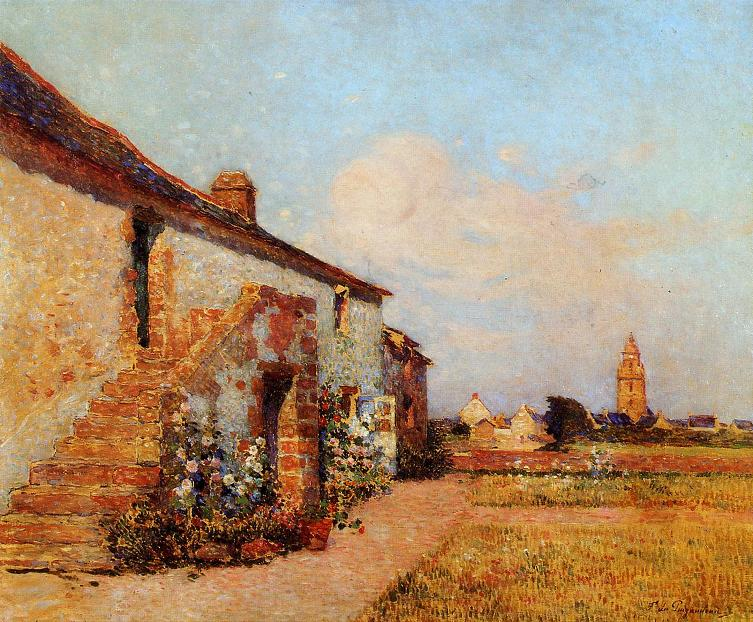
Bourg-de-Batz
