= E. Millicent Sowerby =

American bibliographer (1883–1977)

- Born: September 7, 1883; Beverley, East Riding of Yorkshire, England
- Died: October 23, 1977 (aged 94); Muncie, Indiana
- Occupation: Bibliographer
- Known for: Catalogue of the Library of Thomas Jefferson (1952–1959)

Emily Millicent Sowerby (September 7, 1883 – October 23, 1977) was a bibliographer known for her Catalogue of the Library of Thomas Jefferson.

== Biography ==
Sowerby was born in Beverley, East Riding of Yorkshire, England. After graduating from Girton College, Cambridge, she worked in London as a cataloger for book dealer Wilfrid Michael Voynich and briefly as a librarian at Birkbeck College before serving as a counterintelligence agent in Paris during World War I. Upon her return to England in 1916, Sowerby worked as a cataloger at Sotheby's, the first woman in the 'expert' workforce of an auction house. She moved to the United States in 1923, finding employment as a cataloger with the American Art Association and then at the New York Public Library (until January 1925). In March 1925, she became a bibliographer for A. S. W. Rosenbach's Rosenbach Company in Philadelphia and New York City where she was employed until February 1942. Sowerby was appointed Bibliographer of the Jefferson Collection at the Library of Congress in July 1942. She retired to Muncie, Indiana, where she died on October 23, 1977.

== Major works ==
=== Catalogue of the Library of Thomas Jefferson ===
In 1942, the Library of Congress appointed Sowerby to prepare a catalog of books that Thomas Jefferson had sold to the U.S. government in 1815. The catalog was intended to commemorate the bicentennial of Jefferson's birth in 1943, however, owing to the complexity of the project, the first volume did not appear until 1952. The final volume was published in 1959.

=== Rare People and Rare Books ===
Sowerby published a memoir of her professional career, Rare People and Rare Books, in 1967.
