= Algie Eggertsen Ballif =

American politician (1896–1984)

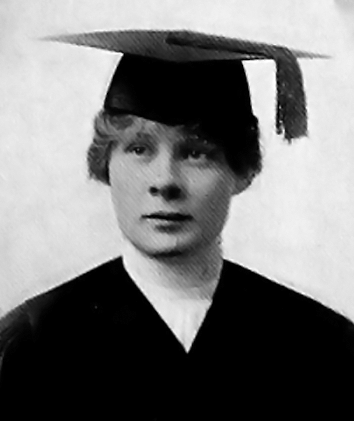
- Born: 3 May 1896; Provo, Utah, U.S.
- Died: 11 July 1984 (aged 88)
- Political party: Democratic
- Spouse: George S. Ballif
- Children: Algene Ballif Marcus; Joan Ballif (Darrell) Jensen; George Eggertsen Ballif; Ann Greta "Grethe" Ballif

Algie Eggertsen Ballif (3 May 1896 – 11 July 1984) was an educational leader and politician in Utah. She served from 1959 to 1961 as a member of the Utah House of Representatives.

== Early life ==
Ballif was born to Lars Eggertsen and Annie Nielsen Eggertsen in Provo, Utah. Ballif was born with a cleft lip. She was the sister of Virginia Sorenson and Esther Peterson. Her family housed students from Brigham Young University (BYU) while she was growing up. Algie was forced to drop some of her classes in order to help out with the chores at home, although her parents always emphasized learning and the importance of education She became interested in dance after attending an opera at the Provo Opera House. She practiced around the house when no one was home, but was able to enroll in dance classes while studying at BYU. Her journal entries show that Ballif was "concerned with the state of art and matters of the heart."

In 1916, Ballif received an assignment from the President of BYU, George Brimhall, to go on a teaching mission at Ricks Academy. She taught many subjects, including gym, theology, expression and English. While at Ricks Academy, she met George S. Ballif at a school dance, whom she would later marry.

She returned to Provo, Utah in 1917 and graduated from BYU in 1918. In the summer of 1920, Ballif moved to Berkeley, California with her father to attend a 12-week dance program. She participated in plays and took classes. These experiences provided her with new ideas to implement in her teaching career at BYU.

She married George S. Ballif (1894–1977) on 24 December 1920 in Salt Lake City, Utah. He, too, graduated from BYU and received a scholarship to Harvard Law School. Algie stayed in Provo and worked to help finance his studies. In 1924, George later transferred schools and received a law degree from the University of California, Berkeley School of Law. He was a city attorney for Provo and later District Attorney. The couple had 4 children: Algene, Joan, George, and Ann "Grethe". Their daughter Ann Greta Ballif was the wife of Chase N. Peterson who served as president of the University of Utah.

== Career ==
=== Teaching ===
Algie Ballif began her teaching career after graduating from Brigham Young University. She began working at American Fork High School from 1918 to 1919. Due to a flu epidemic she was forced to take care of her family. After the epidemic, President George Brimhall offered her a teaching position at BYU. She taught a variety of subjects: speech, English, physical education, dance, and the Book of Mormon. She developed many dance and physical education classes, especially for women at BYU. There was some tension between Ballif and administration over what clothing was appropriate to wear on campus. She taught and developed curriculum until 1923, when she moved to Berkeley, California to be with her husband during his last year of law school.

=== Politician ===
Ballif was elected the president of the state women's branch of the American Legion Convention that was held in Provo in 1930. As president, she attended the National Convention of American Legion Auxiliary, where she gave a ten-minute talk. In 1932, she became the national chairperson of the organization. She was criticized for taking such responsibilities while having young children at home.

In 1935, she was elected to the Provo school board, despite running against two men. She served for five five-year terms, from 1935 to 1958. While serving on the board, she also served as the president of the Utah School Boards Association for two terms. Ballif served for 23 years on the University of Utah Board of Regents. She began the university's first dance program.

Ballif was also associated with the Democratic Party in Utah; she became vice-chair and then chair of the Utah Democratic Party. The part asked her to run for the state senate in 1958. She served from 1959 to 1961 as a member of the Utah House of Representatives. While serving in state legislature, Ballil became involved with John F. Kennedy's campaign and election. She met Eleanor Roosevelt, who was appointed chairperson of the United States Commission on the Status of Women; Ballif's sister Esther Peterson was appointed vice chairperson. Algie was asked by Eleanor Roosevelt to serve on the Education Subcommittee. This job required her to go to Washington, D.C. once a month. In 1963, she ran for the state senate, but lost.

She also served on the Utah State Status of Women Commission. In 1965 she was asked to join the Commission of Public Welfare of the State of Utah; she later became the director of its Division of Family Services. Ballif was appointed to the fifteen-member Commission for the Study of the Health Facilities in the United States in 1967, President Lyndon Johnson.

=== Other Accomplishments ===
Ballif served on the Provo Stake Board of Relief Society in charge of literary lessons for ten years. In 1958, she was named Utah's Man of the Year in Education. She played an active role in her community and was a part of many local and state organizations like the Brigham Young University (BYU) Alumni Association, BYU Emeritus Club, Friends of the BYU Library, PTA, Federated Women's Clubs, Women's Legislative Council, Sorosis, and the American Legion Auxiliary.

== Later life ==
Ballif suffered from macular degeneration. She retired from the Welfare Commission in 1974, ending her government employment. She continued to attend forums, political rallies and other actives. She fought for universal healthcare, elderly rights and the Equal Rights Amendment. Throughout her life, she was a member of the Church of Jesus Christ of Latter-day Saints.

She became blind and partially deaf. Her husband George died in October 1977. After his death, she suffered a series of strokes. She died 11 July 1984. Members of the Quorum of the Twelve Apostles, James E. Faust, Marvin J. Ashton and Dallin H. Oaks spoke at her funeral.
