= Lyall Stuart Scott =

Scottish surgeon

Lyall Stuart Scott FRCSED, FRCSGLAS (22 September 1920 – 8 October 1977) was a Scottish consultant surgeon who specialised in urology.

== Career ==
Lyall Stuart Scott was educated at the High School of Glasgow and Strathallan School, Perthshire; graduating from the University of Glasgow in 1943. Thereafter, he joined the Royal Army Medical Corps, serving in Italy and Austria, where he was appointed Deputy Assistant Director of Medical Services for the Eighth Army.

Following demobolisation he returned to Glasgow and worked in several hospitals in the area. In 1948 he became a Fellow of the Royal College of Surgeons of Edinburgh (FRCSED) and in 1949 a Fellow of the Royal College of Physicians and Surgeons of Glasgow (FRCSGLAS). In his speciality, he qualified Master of Surgery (ChM) in 1955 and Doctor of Medicine (MD) in 1960, both with commendation. In 1961 he was awarded honorary membership of the New York Academy of Sciences.

In 1962 he was appointed consultant urologist at the Western Infirmary, Glasgow and the Royal Beatson Memorial Hospital. In 1967 he was appointed senior consultant urologist, head of department, at the Western Infirmary, Glasgow. Scott published numerous research papers.

Scott served on the editorial committee of the British Journal of Urology, on the council of the British Association of Urological Surgeons and on the urology committee of the Royal Society of Medicine. He was also a former president of the Scottish Urological Society and member of the International Society of Urology.
