= Evelyn Alpern =

American psychiatrist

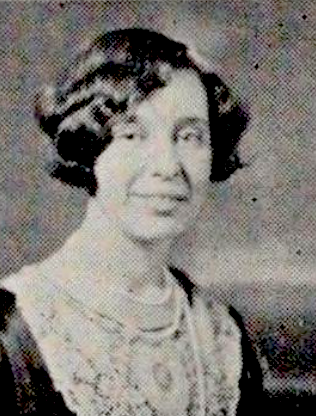
- Evelyn Alpern, from the 1926 yearbook of Syracuse University
- Born: November 12, 1903; New York, U.S.
- Died: October 26, 1977 (aged 73); Buffalo, New York. U.S.
- Occupation: Child psychiatrist

Evelyn Ethel Alpern (November 12, 1903 – October 26, 1977) was an American child psychiatrist based in Buffalo, New York.

== Early life and education ==
Alpern was born in New York, the daughter of Julius Alpern and Minnie Finkelstein Alpern. Her parents were Jewish immigrants from Russia. Her father ran an apparel store in Buffalo from the 1890s until 1930, when he became an insurance agent. She attended Syracuse University, and earned her medical degree at the University at Buffalo in 1926, with further training in psychiatry at the Philadelphia Child Guidance Clinic.

== Career ==
Alpern worked at Danvers State Hospital from 1929 to 1931, and as an assistant probate officer in Chelsea early in her career. She was director of the Child Guidance Clinic in Providence, Rhode Island, and taught at the University of Pennsylvania School of Nursing from 1931 to 1933, Smith College from 1934 to 1938, the University of Pennsylvania in 1934, Brown University Medical School and at Children's Hospital of Philadelphia.

Alpern became director of the Child Guidance Clinic at the Children's Hospital of Buffalo in 1948. She was assistant clinical professor of psychiatry and assistant professor of pediatrics in the medical school of the University at Buffalo. She was quoted as an expert in newspaper articles about children's mental health issues, especially on the subject of juvenile delinquency. "We are aware of the realities of conditions today," she explained in 1937, "and so the public thinks that more crimes exist. But the same crimes have always existed, and as many, but the public was not acquainted with them."

Alpern retired from the departments of psychiatry and pediatrics in 1969, but continued as director of the Child Guidance Clinic. She was president of the Western New York District branch of the American Psychiatric Association. She was a member of the Women Physicians League.

== Publications ==
- "Short Clinical Services for Children in a Child Guidance Clinic" (1956)
- "The Child and His Welfare" (1959)
- "The Relative Pessimism of Psychologists" (1962, with Z. A. Piotrowski)

== Personal life ==
Alpern was married to a fellow medical professional, Jacob Kulowski, in 1926. They divorced in 1930. She died in 1977, at the age of 73, in Buffalo.
