= Merv Smith (footballer) =

Australian rules footballer (1924–1977)

Personal information
- Full name: Mervyn Davies Smith
- Born: 25 December 1924
- Died: 18 October 1977 (aged 52)
- Original team: Collingwood Juniors
- Height: 180 cm (5 ft 11 in)
- Weight: 76 kg (168 lb)

Playing career^{1}
Years	Club	Games (Goals)
1946–48	Fitzroy	9 (0)
- ^{1} Playing statistics correct to the end of 1948.

Mervyn Davies Smith (25 December 1924 – 18 October 1977) was an Australian rules footballer who played with Fitzroy in the Victorian Football League (VFL).
