= Giosuè Fiorentino =

Italian politician (1898–1977)

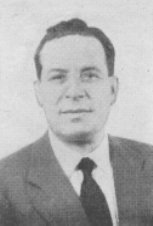
Giosuè Fiorentino

Giosuè Fiorentino (4 November 1898 – 4 October 1977) was an Italian politician.

Fiorentino was born in Palma di Montechiaro. He represented the Italian Socialist Party in the Constituent Assembly of Italy from 1946 to 1948.
