= Ned Nelson =

American athlete (1911–1977)

Ned Nelson (January 11, 1911 – October 2, 1977) was an American college baseball and basketball player.

== Education ==
In 1927, Nelson was a student at Ballard High School in Seattle. While there, he played basketball as a center.

== Baseball ==
Nelson was elected to the University of Washington Hall of Fame in 1989. In 1931 he became the first Washington Husky to be named an All-American at first base. In addition, he led the Huskies to 3 North Division titles from 1930 to 1932.

== Basketball ==
Nelson was a 3-year starter on the UW basketball team. In 1931 he rounded out the starting 5 that won Washington's first Pacific Coast Conference championship.

== Personal life ==
On July 25, 1936, Nelson married Helen Blake at St. John's Episcopal Church in Olympia. Her father was Bruce Blake, a justice of the Washington Supreme Court. She died from infantile paralysis (polio) on September 17 that year during an outbreak of the disease in the Pasco region where they lived.
