= George S. Ballif =

American lawyer

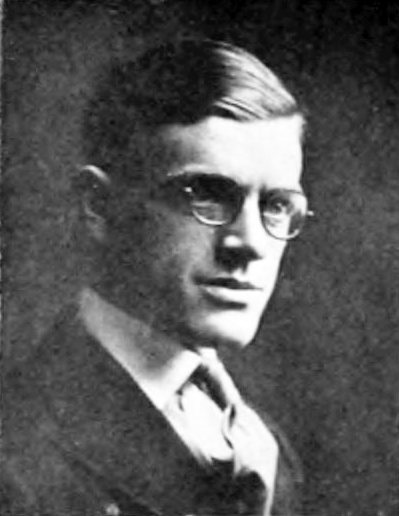
- Born: George Smith Baliff; June 4, 1894; Logan, Utah, U.S.
- Died: October 31, 1977 (aged 83); Salt Lake City, Utah, U.S.
- Occupation: Attorney
- Spouse: Algie Eggertsen Ballif
- Children: 4

George S. Ballif (June 4, 1894 – October 31, 1977) was an early LDS Church Missionary in France. Ballif was born in Logan, Utah, in 1894 before his family moved to Rexburg, Idaho, in 1900. Because of World War I, Ballif was relocated from France to Switzerland and England. After returning home from his mission in 1916, Ballif enrolled in Ricks College. A year later, Ballif was drafted and sent back to France as a soldier. Ballif attended Brigham Young University (BYU) after his return in 1919. Here, he was elected student body president. Ballif graduated from BYU in 1921 before going to Harvard Law School. He later transferred to the UC Berkeley School of Law where he graduated in 1924. He served as city, county, and district attorney in Utah. He was the city judge of Provo, Utah, as well as the president of the Utah County and Utah State Bar Associations. In his personal life, he married Algie Eggersten in 1920. They had four children. Ballif served on many committees and in many clubs throughout his life. He died in Salt Lake City, Utah.

== Early life ==
Ballif was born on June 4, 1894, in Logan, Utah, to John Lyman and Emma Smith Ballif. His family moved to Rexburg, Idaho, in 1900 where his family worked on a dry farm. He worked at Yellowstone Park during tourist seasons. He attended school in Rexburg. Ballif was a member of the Church of Jesus Christ of Latter-day Saints and served a mission in France. He left April 22, 1914; however, due to World War I, he was relocated to Switzerland and England.

Ballif returned from his mission in May 1916, and enrolled in Ricks College. Ballif was drafted by the Army in 1917, and after only a week of training, he went back to France as a soldier. He came home in 1919 and attended Brigham Young University (BYU), where he was voted student body president. Ballif married Algie Eggersten on December 24, 1920, in the Salt Lake Temple. The couple had 4 children: Algene, Joan, George, and Ann "Grethe".

Ballif graduated in 1921 from BYU with a degree in History and Political Science He was accepted to Harvard Law School on scholarship. He transferred to the UC Berkeley School of Law in 1923, and he graduated in 1924.

== Career ==
After graduating, Ballif began his own law practice in Provo. He was appointed city judge in 1924. He was also Provo's juvenile court judge and served as a city, county, and district attorney. He gained a reputation as a public speaker, and also published articles advocating the resolution of international disputes in a world court rather than via the battlefield.

== Memberships ==
As president of the Utah County and Utah State Bar Associations, Ballif he helped establish the World Peace Through Law Committee, and served as its chairperson. He was voted as the commander of the Provo Post. He also served as president of the Provo Kiwanis Club, commander of the Utah Department of the American Legion, chairperson of the Utah Business Regulations Commission, and member of the Industrial School Advisory Board. He was a member of the University of Utah's Board of Regents.

Ballif died October 31, 1977, in Salt Lake City, Utah.
