= Odette du Puigaudeau =

French ethnologist

- Born: 20 July 1894; Saint-Nazaire (Loire-Inférieur), France
- Died: 19 July 1991 (aged 96); Rabat, Morocco
- Occupation: ethnologist

Odette Loyen du Puigaudeau (20 July 1894 – 19 July 1991) was a French ethnologist, traveler and journalist. With artist Marion Sénones (1886–1977), she made three trips to northern Africa to conduct field research among the nomads of the western Sahara region.

== Biography ==
Puigaudeau was born 1894 in Saint-Nazaire (Loire-Inférieur), France, the only child of Ferdinand du Puigaudeau (1864–1930), a painter of the Pont-Aven School, and a mother who was a portrait painter. Beginning in 1908, the family lived in Le Croisic (Loire-Atlantique) in the manor of Kervaudu. She was educated at home by her parents.

In 1920, she moved to Paris to study oceanography at the Sorbonne hoping to find employment at the marine laboratory in Carthage, Tunisia, in northern Africa, but that effort proved to be unsuccessful. She then took a variety of jobs: as a designer in the laboratories of the Collège de France, a stylist at the fashion designer Jeanne Lanvin and a journalist at L'Intransigeant and in women's magazines.

Following her passion for travel, Puigaudeau became one of the first women to live aboard on a Breton tuna vessel in 1929. She described life in the Breton islands at that time in her book Grandeur des îles (Splendor of the Isles). She also attempted to join a scientific expedition to Greenland but her application was refused by the ship's commander Jean-Baptiste Charcot (1867–1936), who would not accept women on board.

=== Desert travels ===
Puigaudeau arranged an ethnographic expedition to the Sahara desert and, more specifically, to Mauritania, in 1933 and 1934 with her life partner Marion Sénones, painter and contributor to her books. The couple embarked on a lobster boat from France and arrived a month later in modern-day Nouadhibou, Mauritania, which was a French colony at that time. In her book, Pieds nus travers la Mauritanie (Barefoot across Mauritania), illustrated by Sénones, Puigaudeau recounted their overland journey of 4,500 km [almost 2,800 miles] "dressed like Moorish men" to research the region's nomads. The book was the winner of a grand prize from the French Academy in 1936 and helped bolster Puigaudeau's notability as an ethnologist.

She arranged to make return trips to the Western Sahara twice more, once between 1936 and 1938, and again in 1950 and 1951. Her second trip took a year to finish the "6,500 kilometers [4,000 miles] across the tracks of southern Morocco, Mauritania and French Sudan (today Mali)."

For each of her trips, Puigaudeau arranged support and funding from several French institutions, including the National Museum of Natural History. In addition, for their last trip they received a support from the French overseas department. According to Sébastien, the official purposes of the trips were to offer the public ethnographic and archaeological perspective of the colonized region and its people through scientific papers and popular articles about Mauritania. She also worked on an ethnography thesis under the supervision of Théodore Monod called, Arts et coutumes des Maures, which was published after Puigaudeau's death.

However, in addition to her scientific goals, Puigaudeau also sought to gain rich personal experiences. According to Sébastien, "What fascinates the two travelers is to live to the rhythm of the nomadic Moors, most often on camels."

=== Activism ===
In Paris, Puigaudeau founded the French Women's Service in August 1940 to help arrange prehistory and ethnography missions by "various ministries and learned societies."

When she arrived in Mauritania for her final expedition in 1950 she found growing local opposition to French colonization, a position with which she came to sympathize. As a result of her new writings on the subject, she faced growing hostility from both French and African colonial authorities. (Mauritania gained its independence from France on 28 November 1960.)

=== Later years ===
Accompanied by Sénones, Puigaudeau moved to Rabat, Morocco in 1961, where she produced cultural radio programs from 1961 to 1962, and worked at the Ministry of Information in 1963. She "took over management of a very young Moroccan prehistory office" at the archaeological museum of Rabat from 1970 to 1977, when Sénones passed away.

Puigaudeau's archives, donated to the Geographical Society in Paris, are kept in the Maps and Plans department at the National Library (BnF) there. However, the whereabouts of films that Puigaudeau was said to have made during her journeys have not been found.

Puigaudeau died 19 July 1991 in Rabat, Morocco.

== Selected publications ==
Odette du Puigaudeau wrote eight books and numerous articles on the Moorish people of the Western Sahara. Sénones co-authored or otherwise contributed to several of her works.

- Odette du Puigaudeau, Marion Sénones, Gravures rupestres du Hank (Sahara Marocain), Bulletin de la Société préhistorique de France, vol. 36, n°11, 1939, pp. 437–453.
- Sénones, Marion, Odette du Puigaudeau, Peintures rupestres du Tagant (Mauritanie), Journal de la Société des africanistes, vol. 9, n°1, 1939, pp. 43–70.
- Odette du Puigaudeau, « Gravures rupestres de la Montagne d'Icht (Sud Marocain), Journal de la Société des africanistes, vol. 11, n°1, 1941, pp. 147–156.
- Sénones, Marion, Odette du Puigaudeau, Gravures rupestres de la Vallée moyenne du Draa (Sud Marocain) Journal de la Société des africanistes, vol. 11, n°1, 1941, pp. 157–168.
- Odette du Puigaudeau, illustré de 30 croquis de route de Marion Sénones, de 46 photographies de l'auteur et de 2 cartes, couverture de Chas Boré, La route de l'ouest (Maroc-Mauritanie, Éditions J.Susse, 1945.
- Odette du Puigaudeau, Grandeur des îles, Julliard, 1946; Julliard 1989; Payot 1996 (preface by Monique Vérité).
- Odette du Puigaudeau, Marion Sénones, Le Cimetière de Bir'Umm Garn, Journal de la Société des africanistes, vol. 17, n°1, 1947, pp. 51–56.
- Odette du Puigaudeau, illustré de 25 croquis de route de Marion Sénones, de 24 photographies de l'auteur et de 3 cartes. Tagant (Mauritanie), Julliard, 1949.
- Senones Marion, Odette du Puigaudeau, Vestiges préislamiques de la région d'Assa, Journal de la Société des africanistes, vol. 22, n°1, 1952, pp. 7–15.
- Odette du Puigaudeau, avec 31 dessins dans le texte de Marion Sénones, 22 illustrations hors texte et sept cartes, La piste Maroc-Sénégal, Plon, 1954.
