= Chuck Radley =

Canadian football player (1925–1977)

Charles Justin Radley
Profile
- Positions: Tackle, Guard

Personal information
- Born: 16 April 1925; Montreal, Quebec, Canada
- Died: 8 October 1977 (aged 52); Regina, Saskatchewan, Canada
- Listed height: 6 ft 0 in (1.83 m)
- Listed weight: 208 lb (94 kg)

Career history
- 1947–1953: Saskatchewan Roughriders

Charles Justin Radley (16 April 1925 – 8 October 1977) was a Canadian professional football player who played for the Saskatchewan Roughriders. He played junior football in Montreal. Radley died in Regina, Saskatchewan on 8 October 1977, at the age of 52.
