= James Denby =

English footballer (1892-1977)

Personal information
- Full name: James Denby
- Date of birth: 6 July 1892
- Place of birth: Sutton-in-Ashfield, England
- Date of death: 14 October 1977 (aged 85)
- Place of death: Mansfield, England
- Height: 5 ft 9 in (1.75 m)
- Position: Half back

Senior career*
Years	Team	Apps	(Gls)
19??–1911	Chesterfield		
1911–1915	Southampton	127	(8)
- * Club domestic league appearances and goals

James Denby (6 July 1892 – 14 October 1977) was an English footballer, who played as a half back for Southampton in the Southern League from 1911 to 1915.

== Football career ==
Born in Sutton-in-Ashfield he started his career with Chesterfield. In the summer of 1911 Southampton's new manager George Swift spent £820 recruiting 11 new players including a return to his former club to sign Denby. Denby made his "Saints" debut in the opening match of the 1911–12 season, a 1–1 draw with Millwall.

Playing alongside Bert Lee and Jim McAlpine, he became an integral part of the team's defence up to the suspension of football in 1915. According to Holley & Chalk's "The Alphabet of the Saints", Denby was "a strong, reliable player (who) played in all three half-back positions with equal merit and was the team's defensive pivot."

His steady influence had a considerable effect on team performances and an improvement in their defensive play. He continued to give the club sterling service up to the outbreak of World War I when he retired from professional football.
