= Ancient Egyptian literature =

Literature written in the Egyptian language

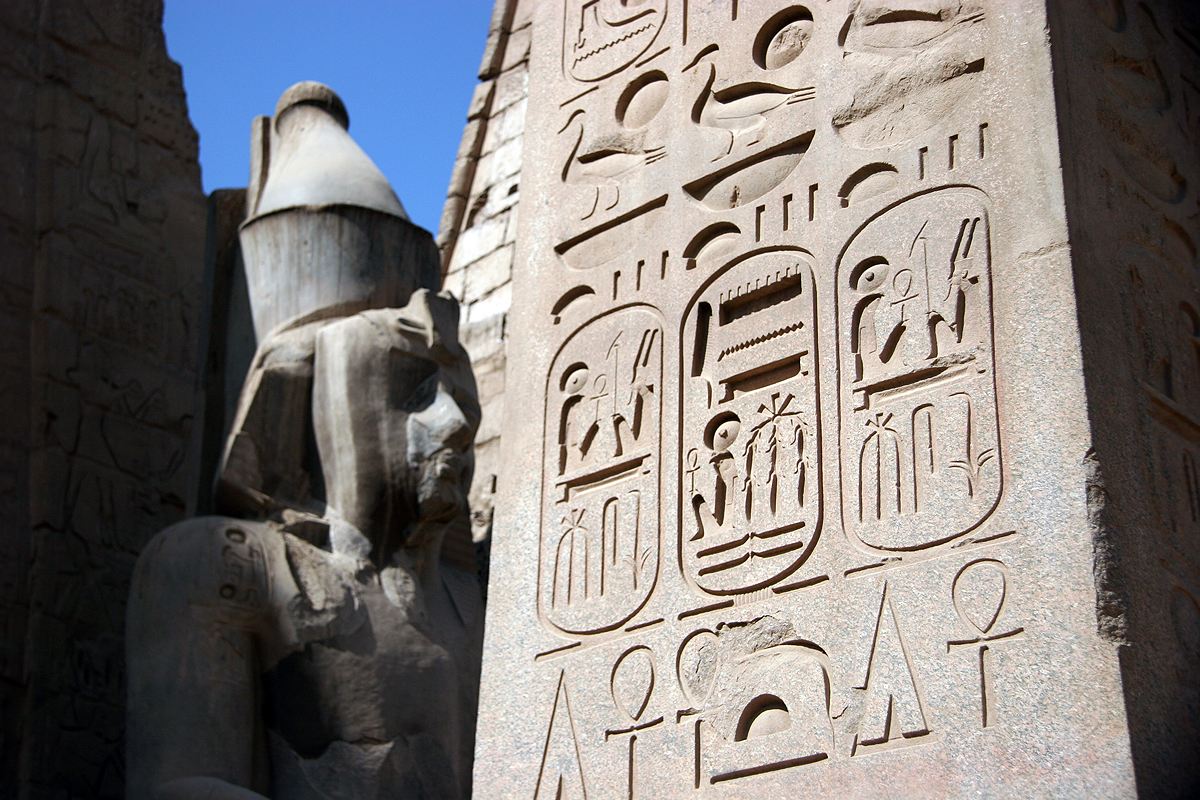
Egyptian hieroglyphs with cartouches for the name "Ramesses II", from the Luxor Temple, New Kingdom

Ancient Egyptian literature was written with the Egyptian language from ancient Egypt's pharaonic period until the end of Roman domination. It represents the oldest corpus of Egyptian literature. Along with Sumerian literature, it is considered the world's earliest literature.

Writing in ancient Egypt—both hieroglyphic and hieratic—first appeared in the late 4th millennium BC during the late phase of predynastic Egypt. By the Old Kingdom (26th century BC to 22nd century BC), literary works included funerary texts, epistles and letters, hymns and poems, and commemorative autobiographical texts recounting the careers of prominent administrative officials. It was not until the early Middle Kingdom (21st century BC to 17th century BC) that a narrative Egyptian literature was created. This was a "media revolution" which, according to Richard B. Parkinson, was the result of the rise of an intellectual class of scribes, new cultural sensibilities about individuality, unprecedented levels of literacy, and mainstream access to written materials. The creation of literature was thus an elite exercise, monopolized by a scribal class attached to government offices and the royal court of the ruling pharaoh. However, there is no full consensus among modern scholars concerning the dependence of ancient Egyptian literature on the sociopolitical order of the royal courts.

Middle Egyptian, the spoken language of the Middle Kingdom, became a classical language during the New Kingdom (16th century BC to 11th century BC), when the vernacular language known as Late Egyptian first appeared in writing. Scribes of the New Kingdom canonized and copied many literary texts written in Middle Egyptian, which remained the language used for oral readings of sacred hieroglyphic texts. Some genres of Middle Kingdom literature, such as "teachings" and fictional tales, remained popular in the New Kingdom, although the genre of prophetic texts was not revived until the Ptolemaic period (4th century BC to 1st century BC). Popular tales included the Story of Sinuhe and The Eloquent Peasant, while important teaching texts include the Instructions of Amenemhat and The Loyalist Teaching. By the New Kingdom period, the writing of commemorative graffiti on sacred temple and tomb walls flourished as a unique genre of literature, yet it employed formulaic phrases similar to other genres. The acknowledgment of rightful authorship remained important only in a few genres, while texts of the "teaching" genre were pseudonymous and falsely attributed to prominent historical figures.

Ancient Egyptian literature has been preserved on a wide variety of media. This includes papyrus scrolls and packets, limestone or ceramic ostraca, wooden writing boards, monumental stone edifices and coffins. Texts preserved and unearthed by modern archaeologists represent a small fraction of ancient Egyptian literary material. The area of the floodplain of the Nile is under-represented because the moist environment is unsuitable for the preservation of papyri and ink inscriptions. On the other hand, hidden caches of literature, buried for thousands of years, have been discovered in settlements on the dry desert margins of Egyptian civilization.

== Scripts, media, and languages ==
=== Hieroglyphs, hieratic, and Demotic ===
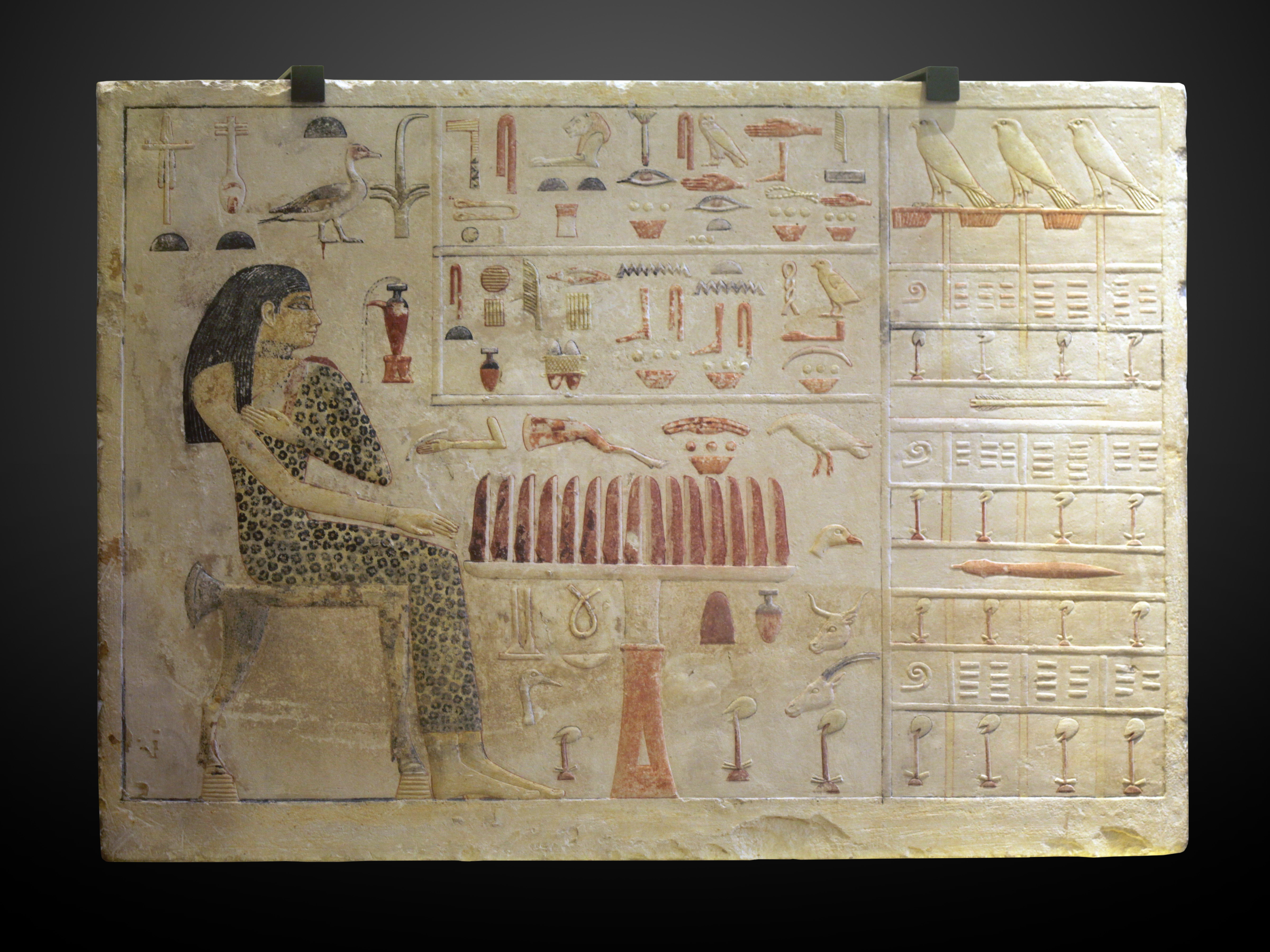
The slab stela of the Old Kingdom Egyptian princess Neferetiabet (dated c. 2590–2565 BC), from her tomb at Giza, with hieroglyphs carved and painted on limestone

Ancient Egyptians used three forms of writing: Hieroglyphs, Hieratic, and later Demotic. Hieroglyphs were used for monuments and, in cursive form, for funerary literature. Hieratic evolved as a more cursive form of hieroglyphs for everyday writing on papyrus. It was used to write both classical Middle Egyptian as well as Late Egyptian. It later was replaced by Demotic, an even more cursive form, relegating hieratic to the role cursive hieroglyphs had held previously, namely priestly writing. By Greek times, this led to a situation where all three scripts were used side by side: Demotic writing, the "common script", was used for everyday administrative and private texts. Hieratic writing remained in use by the priests, leading to Greek name "priestly script". Hieroglyphs continued to be used on temples and monuments (e.g. stelae) until the closure of the temples in Roman times. After this, knowledge of the Egyptian writing systems was lost until their decipherment in the early 1800s.

By the Early Dynastic Period in the late 4th millennium BC, Egyptian hieroglyphs and their cursive form hieratic were well-established written scripts. Egyptian hieroglyphs are small artistic pictures of natural objects. For example, the hieroglyph for door-bolt, pronounced se, produced the s sound; combined with another or multiple hieroglyphs, one could thus spell out the sound of words for more abstract concepts like "sorrow", "happiness", "beauty", and "evil". The Narmer Palette, dated c. 3100 BC during the last phase of Predynastic Egypt, combines the hieroglyphs for "catfish" and "chisel" to produce the name of King Narmer.

The Egyptians called their hieroglyphs "words of god" and reserved their use for exalted purposes, such as communicating with divinities and spirits of the dead through funerary texts. Each hieroglyphic word represented both a specific object and embodied the essence of that object, recognizing it as divinely made and belonging within the greater cosmos. Through acts of priestly ritual, like burning incense, the priest allowed spirits and deities to read the hieroglyphs decorating the surfaces of temples. In funerary texts beginning in and following the Twelfth Dynasty, the Egyptians believed that disfiguring, and even omitting certain hieroglyphs, brought consequences, either good or bad, for a deceased tomb occupant whose spirit relied on the texts as a source of nourishment in the afterlife. Mutilating the hieroglyph of a venomous snake, or other dangerous animal, removed a potential threat. However, removing every instance of the hieroglyphs representing a deceased person's name would deprive his or her soul of the ability to read the funerary texts and condemn that soul to an inanimate existence.

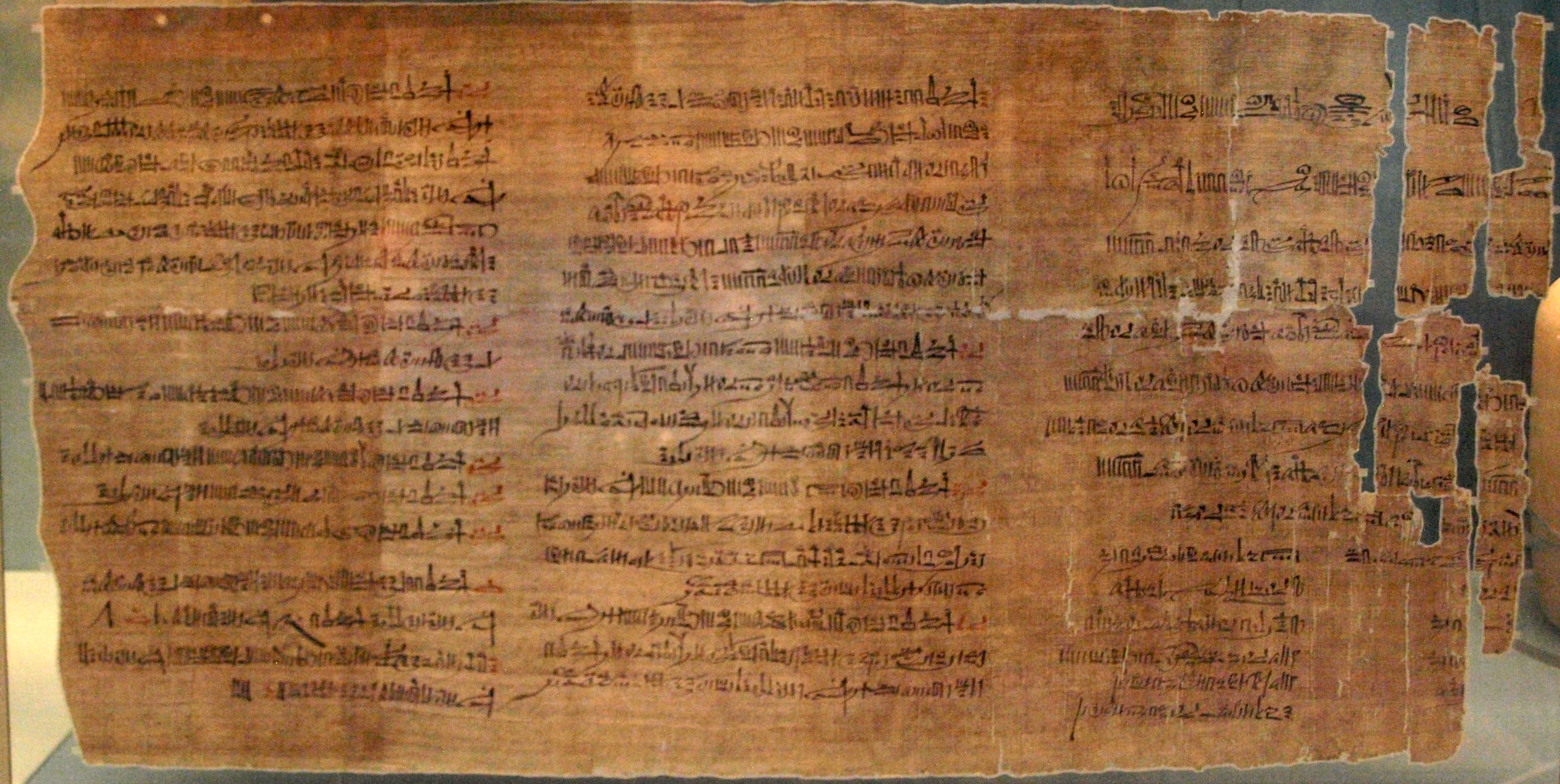
Abbott Papyrus, a record written in hieratic script; it describes an inspection of royal tombs in the Theban Necropolis and is dated to the 16th regnal year of Ramesses IX, c. 1110 BC.

Hieratic is a simplified, cursive form of Egyptian hieroglyphs. Like hieroglyphs, hieratic was used in sacred and religious texts. By the 1st millennium BC, calligraphic hieratic became the script predominantly used in funerary papyri and temple rolls. Whereas the writing of hieroglyphs required the utmost precision and care, cursive hieratic could be written much more quickly and was therefore more practical for scribal record-keeping. Its primary purpose was to serve as a shorthand script for non-royal, non-monumental, and less formal writings such as private letters, legal documents, poems, tax records, medical texts, mathematical treatises, and instructional guides. Hieratic could be written in two different styles; one was more calligraphic and usually reserved for government records and literary manuscripts, the other was used for informal accounts and letters.

By the mid-1st millennium BC, hieroglyphs and hieratic were still used for royal, monumental, religious, and funerary writings, while a new, even more cursive script was used for informal, day-to-day writing: Demotic. The final script adopted by the ancient Egyptians was the Coptic alphabet, a revised version of the Greek alphabet. Coptic became the standard in the 4th century AD when Christianity became the state religion throughout the Roman Empire; hieroglyphs were discarded as idolatrous images of a pagan tradition, unfit for writing the Biblical canon.

=== Writing implements and materials ===
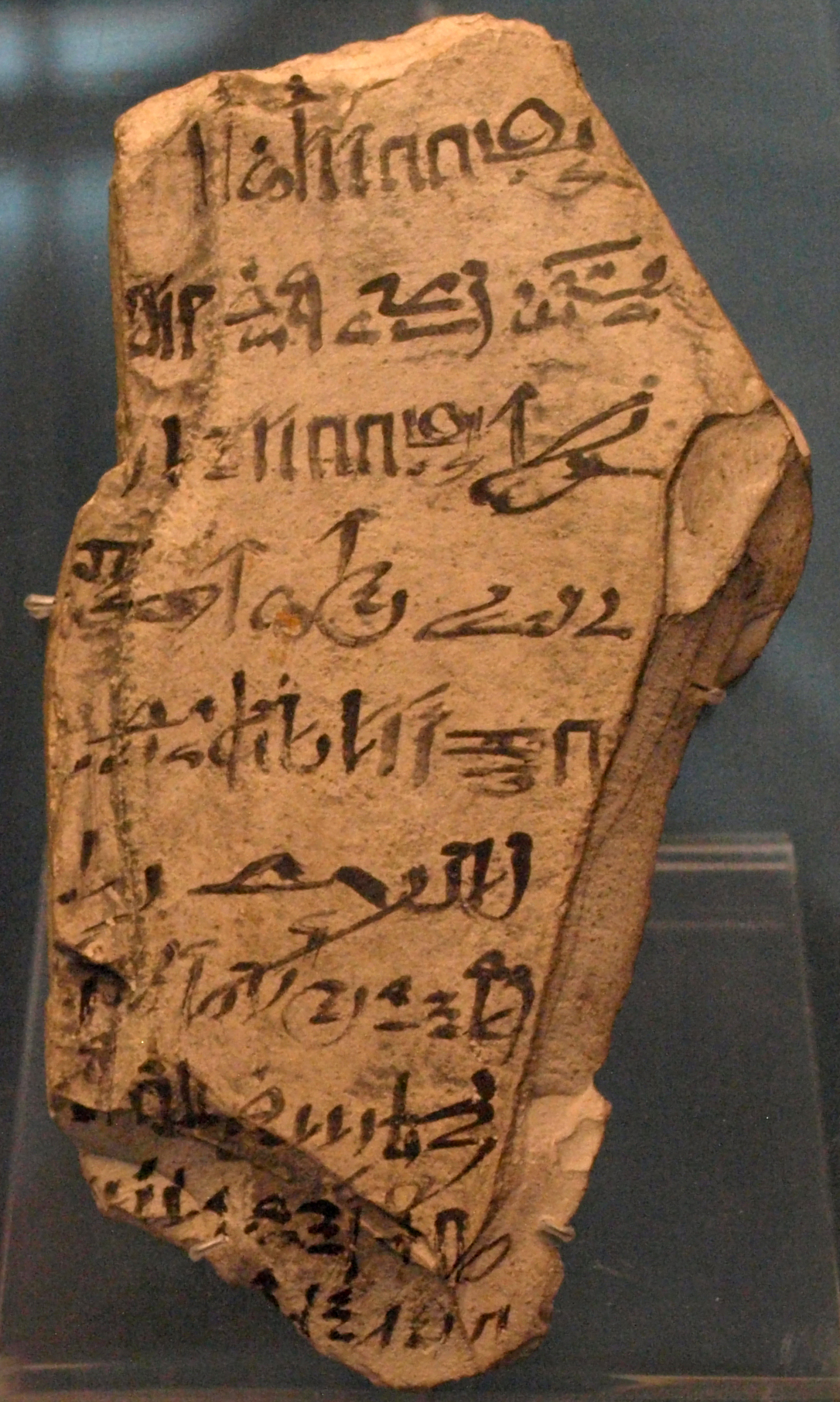
An ostracon with hieratic script mentioning officials involved in the inspection and clearing of tombs during the Twenty-first dynasty of Egypt, c. 1070–945 BC

Egyptian literature was produced on a variety of media. Along with the chisel, necessary for making inscriptions on stone, the chief writing tool of ancient Egypt was the reed pen, a reed fashioned into a stem with a bruised, brush-like end. With pigments of carbon black and red ochre, the reed pen was used to write on scrolls of papyrus—a thin material made from beating together strips of pith from the Cyperus papyrus plant—as well as on small ceramic or limestone potsherds known as ostraca. It is thought that papyrus rolls were moderately expensive commercial items, since many are palimpsests, manuscripts that have had their original contents erased or scraped off to make room for new written works. This, along with the practice of tearing pieces off of larger papyrus documents to make smaller letters, suggests that there were seasonal shortages caused by the limited growing season of Cyperus papyrus. It also explains the frequent use of ostraca and limestone flakes as writing media for shorter written works. In addition to stone, ceramic ostraca, and papyrus, writing media also included wood, ivory, and plaster.

By the Roman period of Egypt, the traditional Egyptian reed pen had been replaced by the chief writing tool of the Greco-Roman world: a shorter, thicker reed pen with a cut nib. Likewise, the original Egyptian pigments were discarded in favor of Greek lead-based inks. The adoption of Greco-Roman writing tools influenced Egyptian handwriting, as hieratic signs became more spaced, had rounder flourishes, and greater angular precision.

=== Preservation of written material ===
Underground Egyptian tombs built in the desert provide possibly the best environment for the preservation of papyrus documents. Many Book of the Dead funerary papyri placed in tombs to act as afterlife guides for the souls of the deceased occupants are quite well-preserved. However, it was only customary during the late Middle Kingdom and first half of the New Kingdom to place non-religious papyri in burial chambers. Thus, the majority of well-preserved literary papyri are dated to this period.

Most settlements in ancient Egypt were situated on the alluvium of the Nile floodplain. This moist environment was unfavorable for long-term preservation of papyrus documents. Archaeologists have discovered a larger quantity of papyrus documents in desert settlements on land elevated above the floodplain, and in settlements that lacked irrigation works, such as Elephantine, El-Lahun, and El-Hiba.

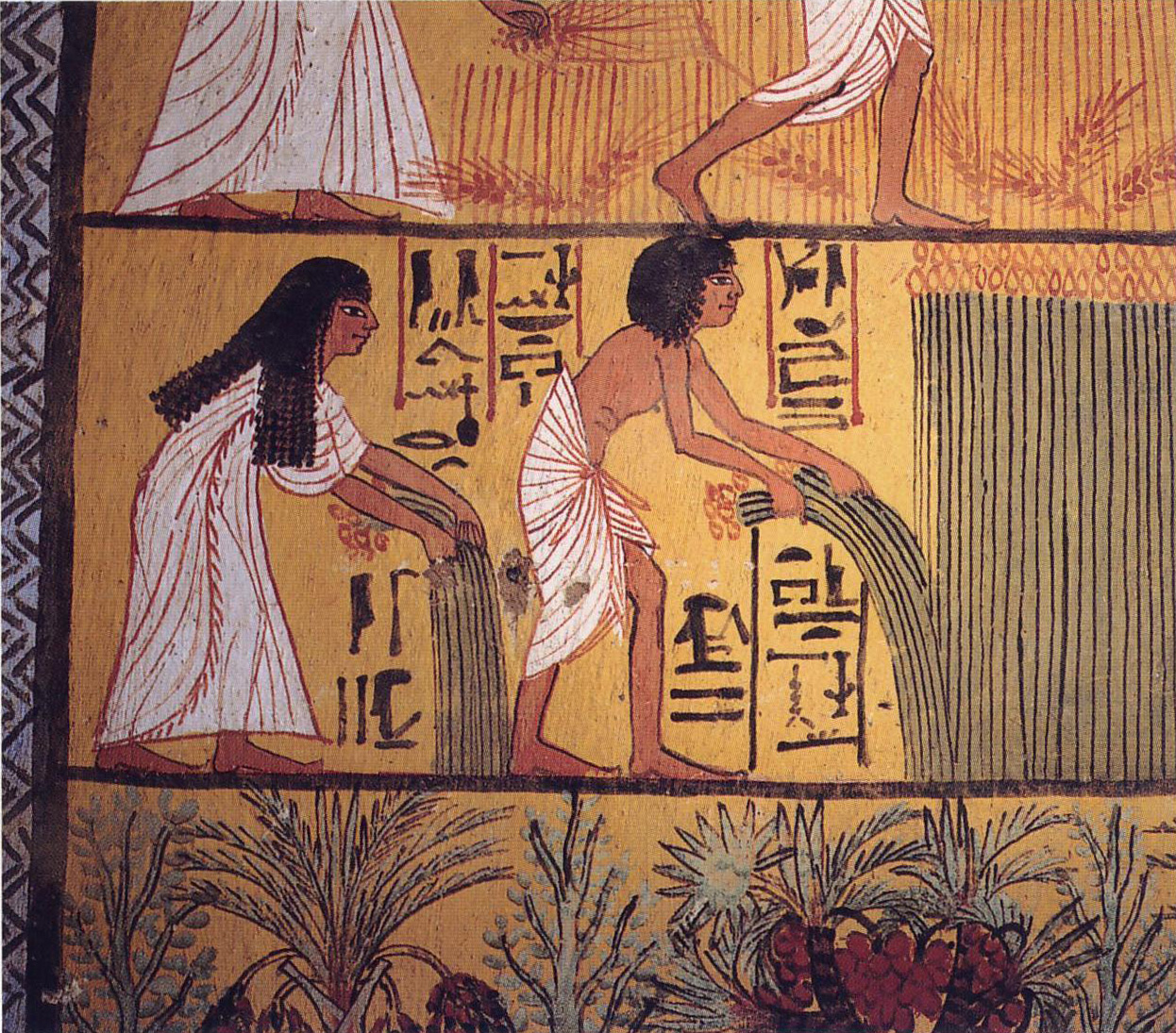
Egyptian peasants harvesting papyrus, from a mural painting in a Deir el-Medina tomb dated to the early Ramesside Period (i.e. Nineteenth dynasty)

Writings on more permanent media have also been lost in several ways. Stones with inscriptions were frequently re-used as building materials, and ceramic ostraca require a dry environment to ensure the preservation of the ink on their surfaces. Whereas papyrus rolls and packets were usually stored in boxes for safekeeping, ostraca were routinely discarded in waste pits; one such pit was discovered by chance at the Ramesside-era village of Deir el-Medina, and has yielded the majority of known private letters on ostraca. Documents found at this site include letters, hymns, fictional narratives, recipes, business receipts, and wills and testaments. Penelope Wilson describes this archaeological find as the equivalent of sifting through a modern landfill or waste container. She notes that the inhabitants of Deir el-Medina were incredibly literate by ancient Egyptian standards, and cautions that such finds only come "in rarefied circumstances and in particular conditions."

John W. Tait stresses, "Egyptian material survives in a very uneven fashion ... the unevenness of survival comprises both time and space." For instance, there is a dearth of written material from all periods from the Nile Delta but an abundance at western Thebes, dating from its heyday. He notes that while some texts were copied numerous times, others survive from a single copy; for example, there is only one complete surviving copy of the Tale of the Shipwrecked Sailor from the Middle Kingdom. However, Tale of the Shipwrecked Sailor also appears in fragments of texts on ostraca from the New Kingdom. Many other literary works survive only in fragments or through incomplete copies of lost originals.

=== Classical, Middle, Late, and Demotic Egyptian language ===
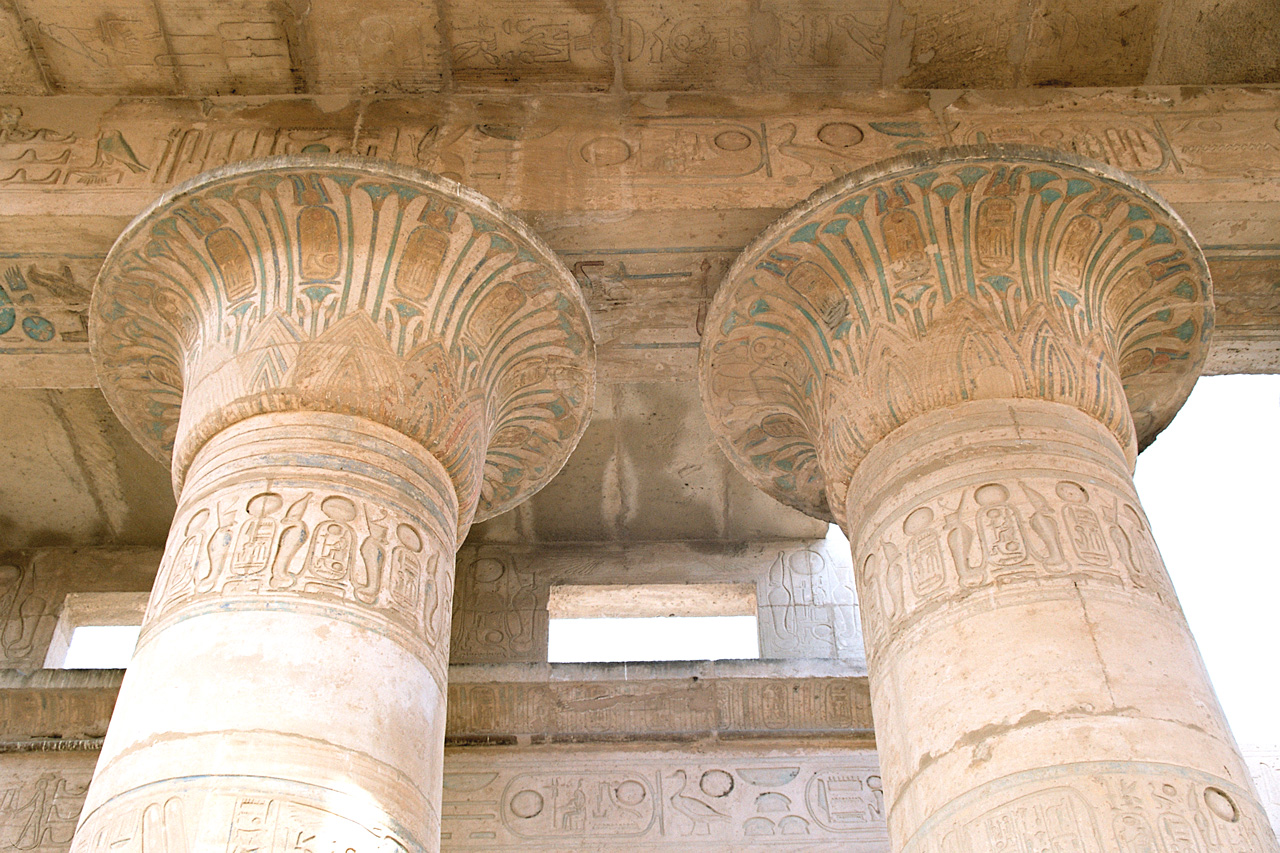
Columns with inscribed and painted Egyptian hieroglyphs, from the hypostyle hall of the Ramesseum (at Luxor) built during the reign of Ramesses II (r. 1279–1213 BC)

Although writing first appeared during the very late 4th millennium BC, it was only used to convey short names and labels; connected strings of text did not appear until about 2600 BC, at the beginning of the Old Kingdom. This development marked the beginning of the first known phase of the Egyptian language: Old Egyptian. Old Egyptian remained a spoken language until about 2100 BC, when, during the beginning of the Middle Kingdom, it evolved into Middle Egyptian. While Middle Egyptian was closely related to Old Egyptian, Late Egyptian was significantly different in grammatical structure. Late Egyptian possibly appeared as a vernacular language as early as 1600 BC, but was not used as a written language until c. 1300 BC during the Amarna Period of the New Kingdom. Late Egyptian evolved into Demotic by the 7th century BC, and although Demotic remained a spoken language until the 5th century AD, it was gradually evolved into Coptic beginning in the 1st century AD.

Hieratic was used alongside hieroglyphs for writing in Old and Middle Egyptian, becoming the dominant form of writing in Late Egyptian. By the New Kingdom and throughout the rest of ancient Egyptian history, Middle Egyptian became a classical language that was usually reserved for reading and writing in hieroglyphs and the spoken language for more exalted forms of literature, such as chronicles and other historical records, commemorative autobiographies, hymns, and funerary spells. However, Middle Kingdom literature written in Middle Egyptian was also rewritten in hieratic during later periods.

== Literary functions: social, religious and educational ==
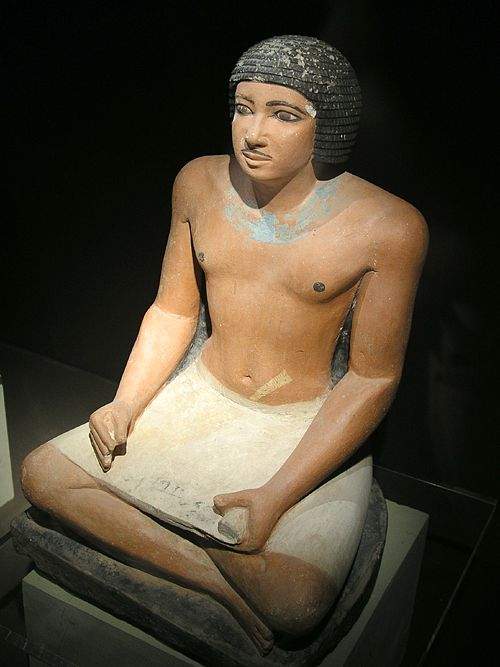
Seated statue of an Egyptian scribe holding a papyrus document in his lap, found in the western cemetery at Giza, Fifth dynasty of Egypt (25th to 24th centuries BC)

Throughout ancient Egyptian history, the ability to read and write were the main requirements for serving in public office, although government officials were assisted in their day-to-day work by an elite, literate social group known as scribes. As evidenced by Papyrus Anastasi I of the Ramesside Period, scribes could even be expected, according to Wilson, "...to organize the excavation of a lake and the building of a brick ramp, to establish the number of men needed to transport an obelisk and to arrange the provisioning of a military mission". Besides government employment, scribal services in drafting letters, sales documents, and legal documents would have been frequently sought by illiterate people. Prevalence and percentage of literacy in Egyptian society remains difficult to determine. Literate people are thought to have comprised 1–15% of the population based on very limited evidence. The percentage varied by period and region. the remainder being illiterate farmers, herdsmen, artisans, and other laborers, as well as merchants who required the assistance of scribal secretaries. The privileged status of the scribe over illiterate manual laborers was the subject of a popular Ramesside Period instructional text, The Satire of the Trades, where lowly, undesirable occupations, for example, potter, fisherman, laundry man, and soldier, were mocked and the scribal profession praised. A similar demeaning attitude towards the illiterate is expressed in the Middle Kingdom Teaching of Khety, which is used to reinforce the scribes' elevated position within the social hierarchy.

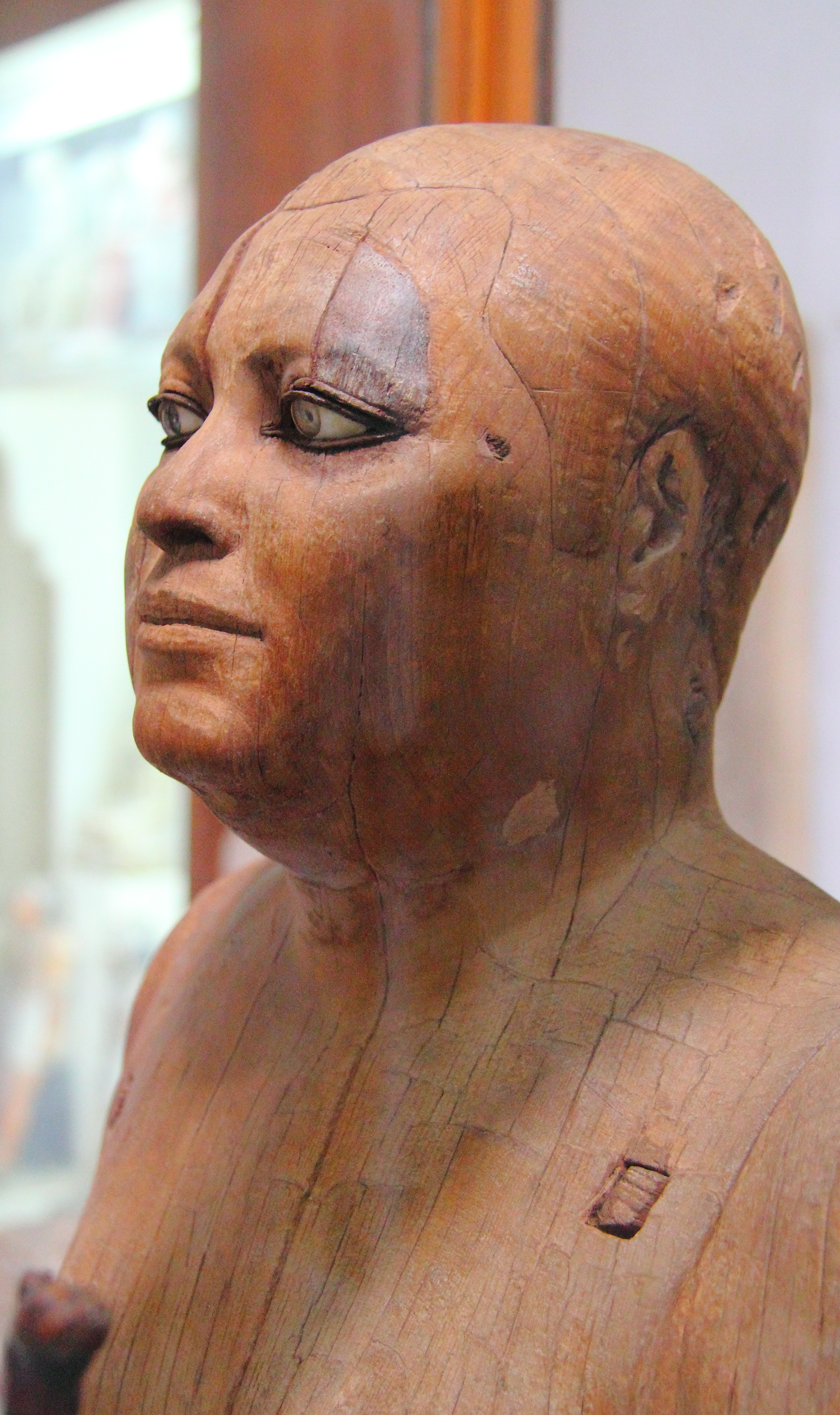
Wooden statue of the scribe Kaaper, 5th or 4th dynasty of the Old Kingdom, from Saqqara, c. 2500 BC

The scribal class was the social group responsible for maintaining, transmitting, and canonizing literary classics, and writing new compositions. Classic works, such as the Story of Sinuhe and Instructions of Amenemhat, were copied by schoolboys as pedagogical exercises in writing and to instill the required ethical and moral values that distinguished the scribal social class. Wisdom texts of the "teaching" genre represent the majority of pedagogical texts written on ostraca during the Middle Kingdom; narrative tales, such as Sinuhe and King Neferkare and General Sasenet, were rarely copied for school exercises until the New Kingdom. William Kelly Simpson describes narrative tales such as Sinuhe and The Shipwrecked Sailor as "...instructions or teachings in the guise of narratives", since the main protagonists of such stories embodied the accepted virtues of the day, such as love of home or self-reliance.

The Book of Kemyt, a Middle Egyptian letter-like composition, was copied by scribes at different stages of their training and became part of the New Kingdom scribal curriculum; approximately 500 textual witnesses are currently known.

There are some known instances where those outside the scribal profession were literate and had access to classical literature.Menena, a draughtsman working at Deir el-Medina during the Twentieth dynasty of Egypt, quoted passages from the Middle Kingdom narratives Eloquent Peasant and Tale of the Shipwrecked Sailor in an instructional letter reprimanding his disobedient son. Menena's Ramesside contemporary Hori, the scribal author of the satirical letter in Papyrus Anastasi I, admonished his addressee for quoting the Instruction of Hardjedef in the unbecoming manner of a non-scribal, semi-educated person. Hans-Werner Fischer-Elfert further explains this perceived amateur affront to orthodox literature:

What may be revealed by Hori's attack on the way in which some Ramesside scribes felt obliged to demonstrate their greater or lesser acquaintance with ancient literature is the conception that these venerable works were meant to be known in full and not to be misused as quarries for popular sayings mined deliberately from the past. The classics of the time were to be memorized completely and comprehended thoroughly before being cited.

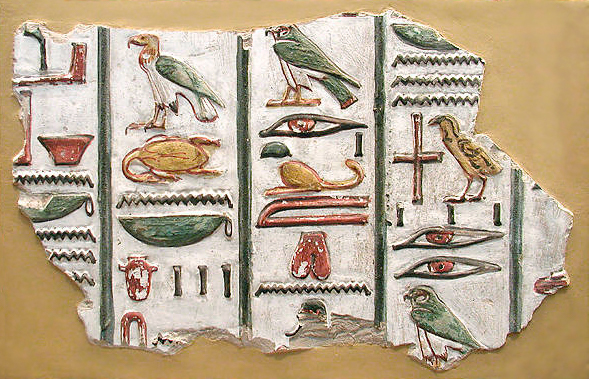
Hieroglyphs from the Mortuary Temple of Seti I, now in the British Museum

There is limited but solid evidence in Egyptian literature and art for the practice of oral reading of texts to audiences. The oral performance word "to recite" (šdj) was usually associated with biographies, letters, and spells. Singing (ḥsj) was meant for praise songs, love songs, funerary laments, and certain spells. Discourses such as the Prophecy of Neferti suggest that compositions were meant for oral reading among elite gatherings. In the 1st millennium BC Demotic short story cycle centered on the deeds of Petiese, the stories begin with the phrase "The voice which is before Pharaoh", which indicates that an oral speaker and audience was involved in the reading of the text. A fictional audience of high government officials and members of the royal court are mentioned in some texts, but a wider, non-literate audience may have been involved. For example, a funerary stela of Senusret I (r. 1971–1926 BC) explicitly mentions people who will gather and listen to a scribe who "recites" the stela inscriptions out loud.

Literature also served religious purposes. Beginning with the Pyramid Texts of the Old Kingdom, works of funerary literature written on tomb walls, and later on coffins, and papyri placed within tombs, were designed to protect and nurture souls in their afterlife. This included the use of magical spells, incantations, and lyrical hymns. Copies of non-funerary literary texts found in non-royal tombs suggest that the dead could entertain themselves in the afterlife by reading these teaching texts and narrative tales.

Although the creation of literature was predominantly a male scribal pursuit, some works are thought to have been written by women. For example, several references to women writing letters and surviving private letters sent and received by women have been found. However, Edward F. Wente asserts that, even with explicit references to women reading letters, it is possible that women employed others to write documents.

== Dating, setting, and authorship ==
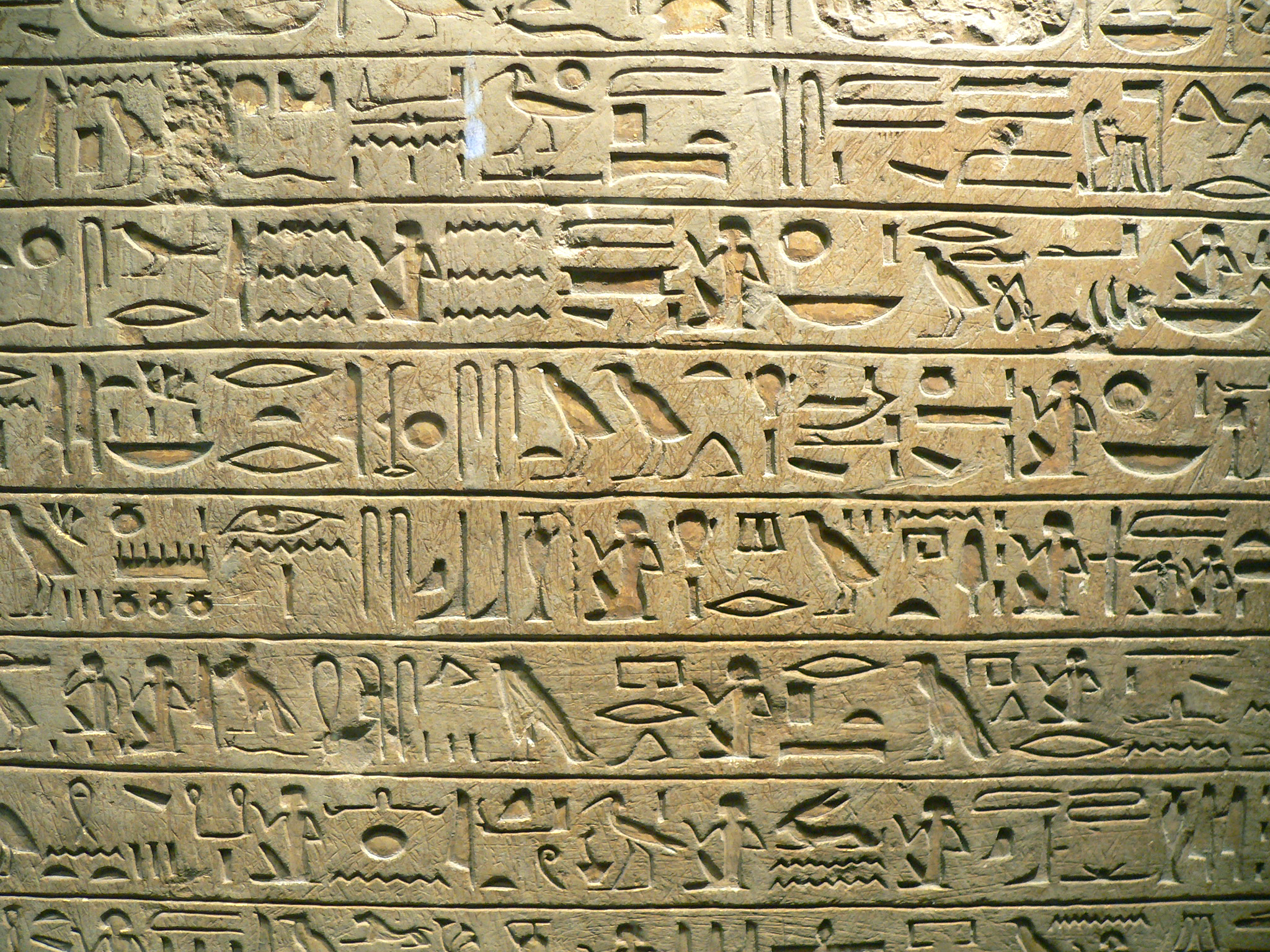
The stela of Minnakht, chief of the scribes, hieroglyph inscriptions, dated to the reign of Ay (r. 1323–1319 BC)

Richard B. Parkinson and Ludwig D. Morenz write that ancient Egyptian literature—narrowly defined as belles-lettres ("beautiful writing")—was not recorded in written form until the early Twelfth dynasty of the Middle Kingdom. Old Kingdom texts served mainly to maintain the divine cults, preserve souls in the afterlife, and document accounts for practical uses in daily life. It was not until the Middle Kingdom that texts were written for the purpose of entertainment and intellectual curiosity. Parkinson and Morenz also speculate that written works of the Middle Kingdom were transcriptions of the oral literature of the Old Kingdom. It is known that some oral poetry was preserved in later writing; for example, litter-bearers' songs were preserved as written verses in tomb inscriptions of the Old Kingdom.

Dating texts by methods of palaeography, the study of handwriting, is problematic because of differing styles of hieratic script. The use of orthography, the study of writing systems and symbol usage, is also problematic, since some texts' authors may have copied the characteristic style of an older archetype. Fictional accounts were often set in remote historical settings, the use of contemporary settings in fiction being a relatively recent phenomenon. The style of a text provides little help in determining an exact date for its composition, as genre and authorial choice might be more concerned with the mood of a text than the era in which it was written. For example, authors of the Middle Kingdom could set fictional wisdom texts in the golden age of the Old Kingdom (e.g. Kagemni, Ptahhotep, and the prologue of Neferti), or they could write fictional accounts placed in a chaotic age resembling more the problematic life of the First Intermediate Period (e.g. Merykare and The Eloquent Peasant). Other fictional texts are set in illo tempore (in an indeterminable era) and usually contain timeless themes.

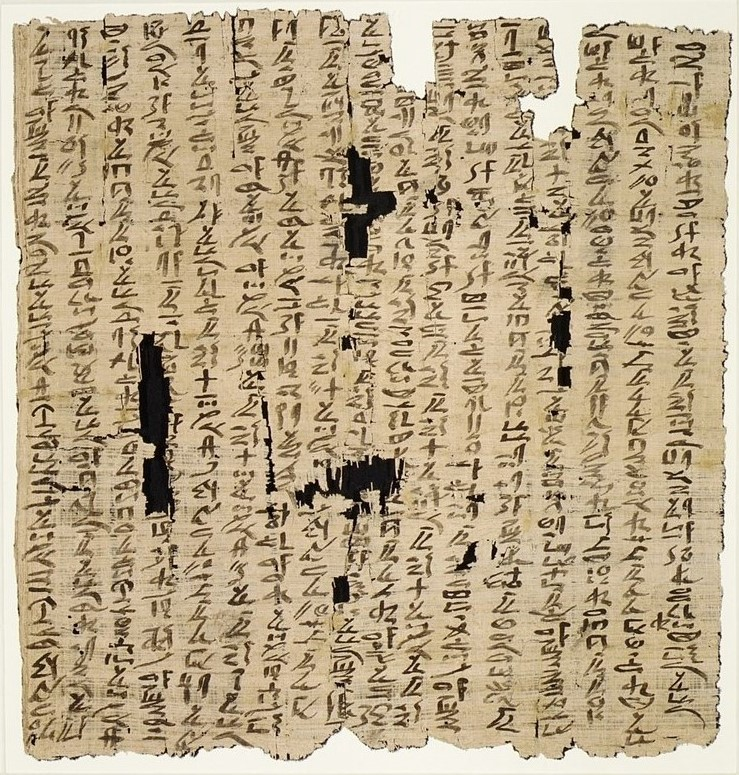
One of the Heqanakht papyri, a collection of hieratic private letters dated to the Eleventh dynasty of the Middle Kingdom

Parkinson writes that nearly all literary texts were pseudonymous, and frequently falsely attributed to well-known male protagonists of earlier history, such as kings and viziers. Only the literary genres of "teaching" and "laments/discourses" contain works attributed to historical authors; texts in genres such as "narrative tales" were never attributed to a well-known historical person. Tait asserts that during the Classical Period of Egypt, "Egyptian scribes constructed their own view of the history of the role of scribes and of the 'authorship' of texts", but during the Late Period, this role was instead maintained by the religious elite attached to the temples.

There are a few exceptions to the rule of pseudonymity. The real authors of some Ramesside Period teaching texts were acknowledged, but these cases are rare, localized, and do not typify mainstream works. Those who wrote private and sometimes model letters were acknowledged as the original authors. Private letters could be used in courts of law as testimony, since a person's unique handwriting could be identified as authentic. Private letters received or written by the pharaoh were sometimes inscribed in hieroglyphics on stone monuments to celebrate kingship, while kings' decrees inscribed on stone stelas were often made public.

== Literary genres and subjects ==
Modern Egyptologists categorize Egyptian texts into genres, for example "laments/discourses" and narrative tales. The only genre of literature named as such by the ancient Egyptians was the "teaching" or sebayt genre. Parkinson states that the titles of a work, its opening statement, or key words found in the body of text should be used as indicators of its particular genre. Only the genre of "narrative tales" employed prose, yet many of the works of that genre, as well as those of other genres, were written in verse. Most ancient Egyptian verses were written in couplet form, but sometimes triplets and quatrains were used.

=== Instructions and teachings ===
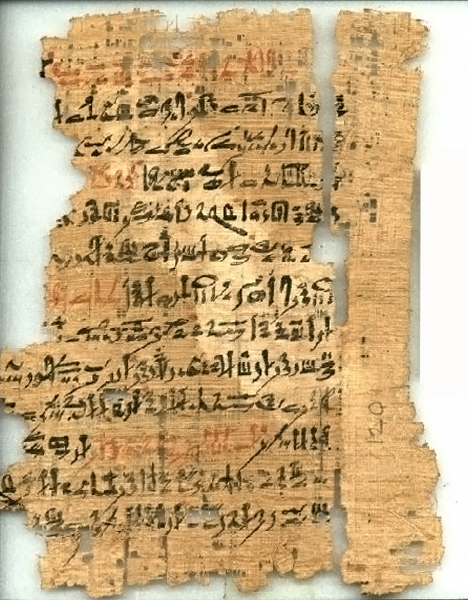
A New Kingdom copy on papyrus of the Loyalist Teaching, written in hieratic script

The "instructions" or "teaching" genre, as well as the genre of "reflective discourses", can be grouped in the larger corpus of wisdom literature found in the ancient Near East. The genre is didactic in nature and is thought to have formed part of the Middle Kingdom scribal education syllabus. However, teaching texts often incorporate narrative elements that can instruct as well as entertain. Parkinson asserts that there is evidence that teaching texts were not created primarily for use in scribal education, but for ideological purposes. For example, Adolf Erman (1854–1937) writes that the fictional instruction given by Amenemhat I (r. 1991–1962 BC) to his sons "...far exceeds the bounds of school philosophy, and there is nothing whatever to do with school in a great warning his children to be loyal to the king". While narrative literature, embodied in works such as The Eloquent Peasant, emphasize the individual hero who challenges society and its accepted ideologies, the teaching texts instead stress the need to comply with society's accepted dogmas.

Key words found in teaching texts include "to know" (rḫ) and "to teach" (sbꜣ). These texts usually adopt the formulaic title structure of "the instruction of X made for Y", where "X" can be represented by an authoritative figure (such as a vizier or king) providing moral guidance to his son(s). It is sometimes difficult to determine how many fictional addressees are involved in these teachings, since some texts switch between singular and plural when referring to their audiences.

Examples of the "teaching" genre include the Maxims of Ptahhotep, Instructions of Kagemni, Teaching for King Merykare, Instructions of Amenemhat, Instruction of Hardjedef, Loyalist Teaching, and Instructions of Amenemope. Teaching texts that have survived from the Middle Kingdom were written on papyrus manuscripts. No educational ostraca from the Middle Kingdom have survived. The earliest schoolboy's wooden writing board, with a copy of a teaching text (i.e. Ptahhotep), dates to the Eighteenth dynasty. Ptahhotep and Kagemni are both found on the Prisse Papyrus, which was written during the Twelfth dynasty of the Middle Kingdom. The entire Loyalist Teaching survives only in manuscripts from the New Kingdom, although the entire first half is preserved on a Middle Kingdom biographical stone stela commemorating the Twelfth dynasty official Sehetepibre. Merykare, Amenemhat, and Hardjedef are genuine Middle Kingdom works, but only survive in later New Kingdom copies. Amenemope is a New Kingdom compilation.

=== Narrative tales and stories ===
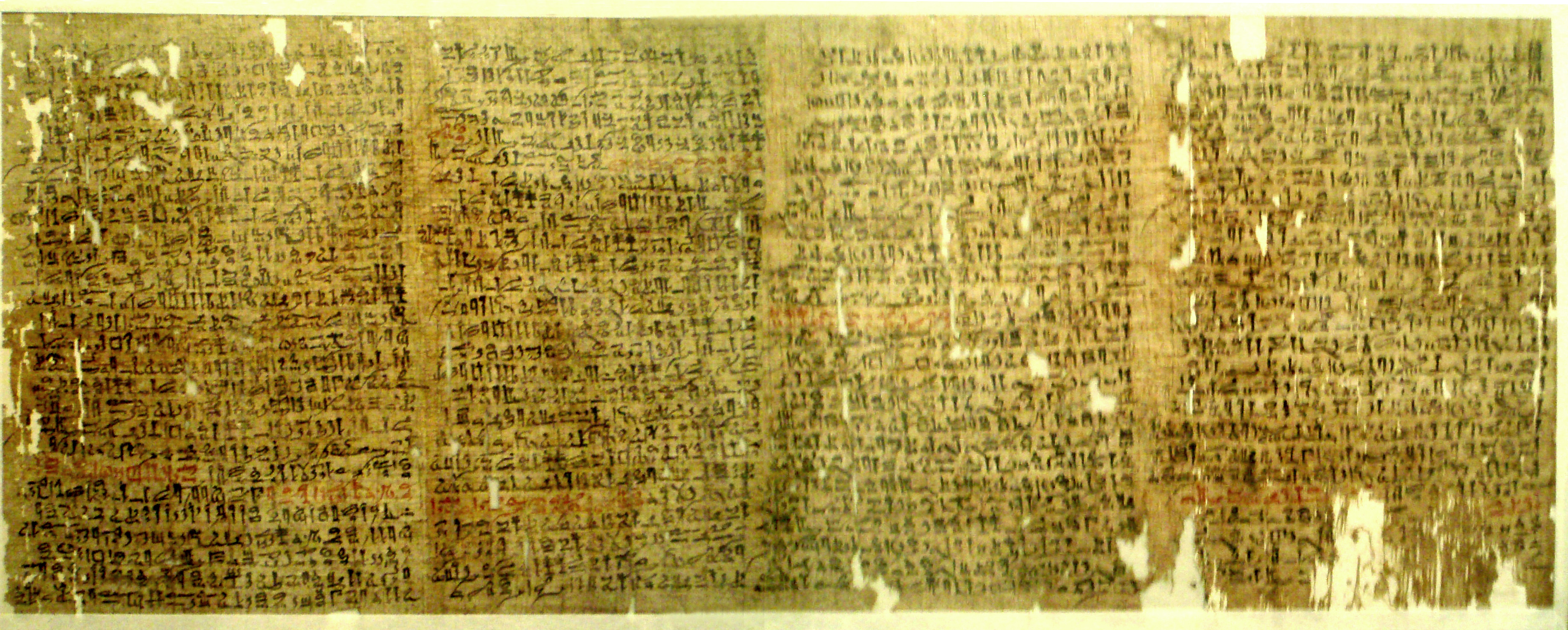
The Westcar Papyrus, although written in hieratic during the Fifteenth to Seventeenth dynasties, contains the Tale of the Court of King Cheops, which is written in a phase of Middle Egyptian that is dated to the Twelfth dynasty.

The genre of "tales and stories" is probably the least represented genre from surviving literature of the Middle Kingdom and Middle Egyptian. In Late Egyptian literature, "tales and stories" comprise the majority of surviving literary works dated from the Ramesside Period of the New Kingdom into the Late Period. Major narrative works from the Middle Kingdom include the Tale of the Court of King Cheops, King Neferkare and General Sasenet, The Eloquent Peasant, Story of Sinuhe, and Tale of the Shipwrecked Sailor. The New Kingdom corpus of tales includes the Quarrel of Apepi and Seqenenre, The Taking of Joppa, Tale of the Doomed Prince, Tale of Two Brothers, and the Report of Wenamun. Stories from the 1st millennium BC written in Demotic include the story of the Famine Stela (set in the Old Kingdom, although written during the Ptolemaic dynasty) and short story cycles of the Ptolemaic and Roman periods that transform well-known historical figures such as Khaemweset (Nineteenth Dynasty) and Inaros (First Persian Period) into legendary heroes. This is contrasted with many stories written in Late Egyptian, whose authors frequently chose divinities as protagonists and mythological places as settings.

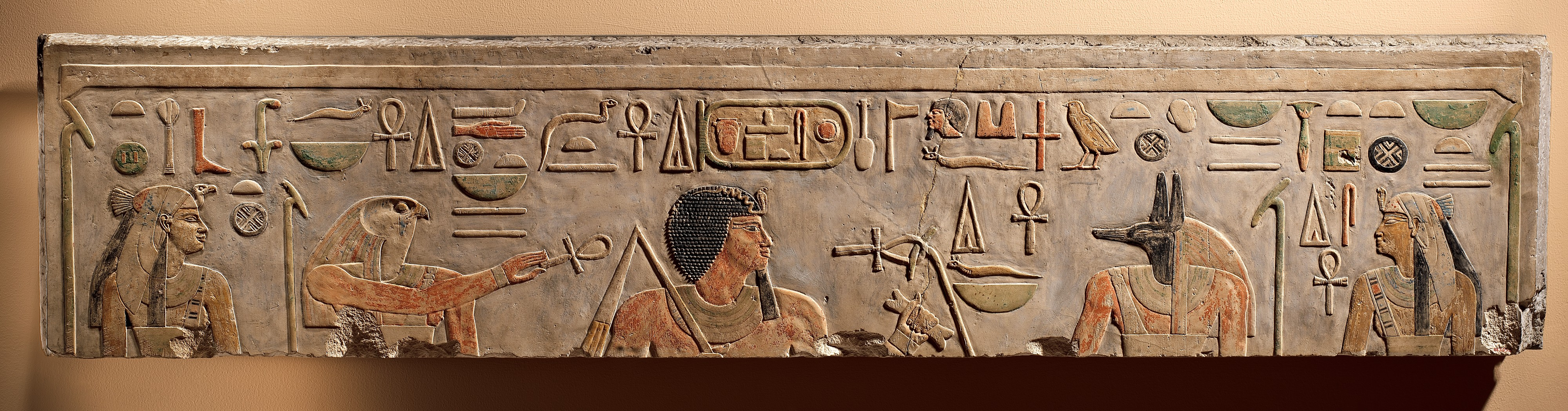
A raised-relief depiction of Amenemhat I accompanied by deities; the death of Amenemhat I is recounted in the Instructions of Amenemhat, as well as being reported by his son Senusret I in the Story of Sinuhe.

Parkinson defines tales as "...non-commemorative, non-functional, fictional narratives" that usually employ the key word "narrate" (sdd). He describes it as the most open-ended genre, since the tales often incorporate elements of other literary genres. For example, Morenz describes the opening section of the foreign adventure tale Sinuhe as a "...funerary self-presentation" that parodies the typical autobiography found on commemorative funerary stelas. The autobiography is for a courier whose service began under Amenemhat I. Simpson states that the death of Amenemhat I in the report given by his son, coregent, and successor Senusret I (r. 1971–1926 BC) to the army in the beginning of Sinuhe is "...excellent propaganda". Morenz describes The Shipwrecked Sailor as an expeditionary report and a travel-narrative myth. Simpson notes the literary device of the story within a story in The Shipwrecked Sailor may provide "...the earliest examples of a narrative quarrying report". With the setting of a magical desert island, and a character who is a talking snake, The Shipwrecked Sailor may also be classified as a fairy tale. While stories like Sinuhe, Taking of Joppa, and the Doomed prince contain fictional portrayals of Egyptians abroad, the Report of Wenamun is most likely based on a true account of an Egyptian who traveled to Byblos in Phoenicia to obtain cedar for shipbuilding during the reign of Ramesses XI.

Narrative tales and stories are most often found on papyri, but partial and sometimes complete texts are found on ostraca. For example, Sinuhe is found on five papyri composed during the Twelfth and Thirteenth dynasties. This text was later copied numerous times on ostraca during the Nineteenth and Twentieth dynasties, with one ostraca containing the complete text on both sides.

=== Laments, discourses, dialogues, and prophecies ===
The Middle Kingdom genre of "prophetic texts", also known as "laments", "discourses", "dialogues", and "apocalyptic literature", include such works as the Admonitions of Ipuwer, Prophecy of Neferti, and Dispute between a man and his Ba. This genre had no known precedent in the Old Kingdom and no known original compositions were produced in the New Kingdom. However, works like Prophecy of Neferti were frequently copied during the Ramesside Period of the New Kingdom, when this Middle Kingdom genre was canonized but discontinued. Egyptian prophetic literature underwent a revival during the Greek Ptolemaic dynasty and Roman period of Egypt with works such as the Demotic Chronicle, Oracle of the Lamb, Oracle of the Potter, and two prophetic texts that focus on Nectanebo II (r. 360–343 BC) as a protagonist. Along with "teaching" texts, these reflective discourses (key word mdt) are grouped with the wisdom literature category of the ancient Near East.

The ba in bird form, one component of the Egyptian soul that is discussed in the Middle Kingdom discourse Dispute between a man and his Ba

In Middle Kingdom texts, connecting themes include a pessimistic outlook, descriptions of social and religious change, and great disorder throughout the land, taking the form of a syntactic "then-now" verse formula. Although these texts are usually described as laments, Neferti digresses from this model, providing a positive solution to a problematic world. Although it survives only in later copies from the Eighteenth dynasty onward, Parkinson asserts that, due to obvious political content, Neferti was originally written during or shortly after the reign of Amenemhat I. Simpson calls it "...a blatant political pamphlet designed to support the new regime" of the Twelfth dynasty founded by Amenemhat, who usurped the throne from the Mentuhotep line of the Eleventh dynasty. In the narrative discourse, Sneferu (r. 2613–2589 BC) of the Fourth dynasty summons to court the sage and lector priest Neferti. Neferti entertains the king with prophecies that the land will enter into a chaotic age, alluding to the First Intermediate Period, only to be restored to its former glory by a righteous king— Ameny—whom the ancient Egyptian would readily recognize as Amenemhat I. A similar model of a tumultuous world transformed into a golden age by a savior king was adopted for the Lamb and Potter, although for their audiences living under Roman domination, the savior was yet to come.

Although written during the Twelfth dynasty, Ipuwer only survives from a Nineteenth dynasty papyrus. However, A man and his Ba is found on an original Twelfth dynasty papyrus, Papyrus Berlin 3024. These two texts resemble other discourses in style, tone, and subject matter, although they are unique in that the fictional audiences are given very active roles in the exchange of dialogue. In Ipuwer, a sage addresses an unnamed king and his attendants, describing the miserable state of the land, which he blames on the king's inability to uphold royal virtues. This can be seen either as a warning to kings or as a legitimization of the current dynasty, contrasting it with the supposedly turbulent period that preceded it. In A man and his Ba, a man recounts for an audience a conversation with his ba (a component of the Egyptian soul) on whether to continue living in despair or to seek death as an escape from misery.

=== Poems, songs, hymns, and afterlife texts ===
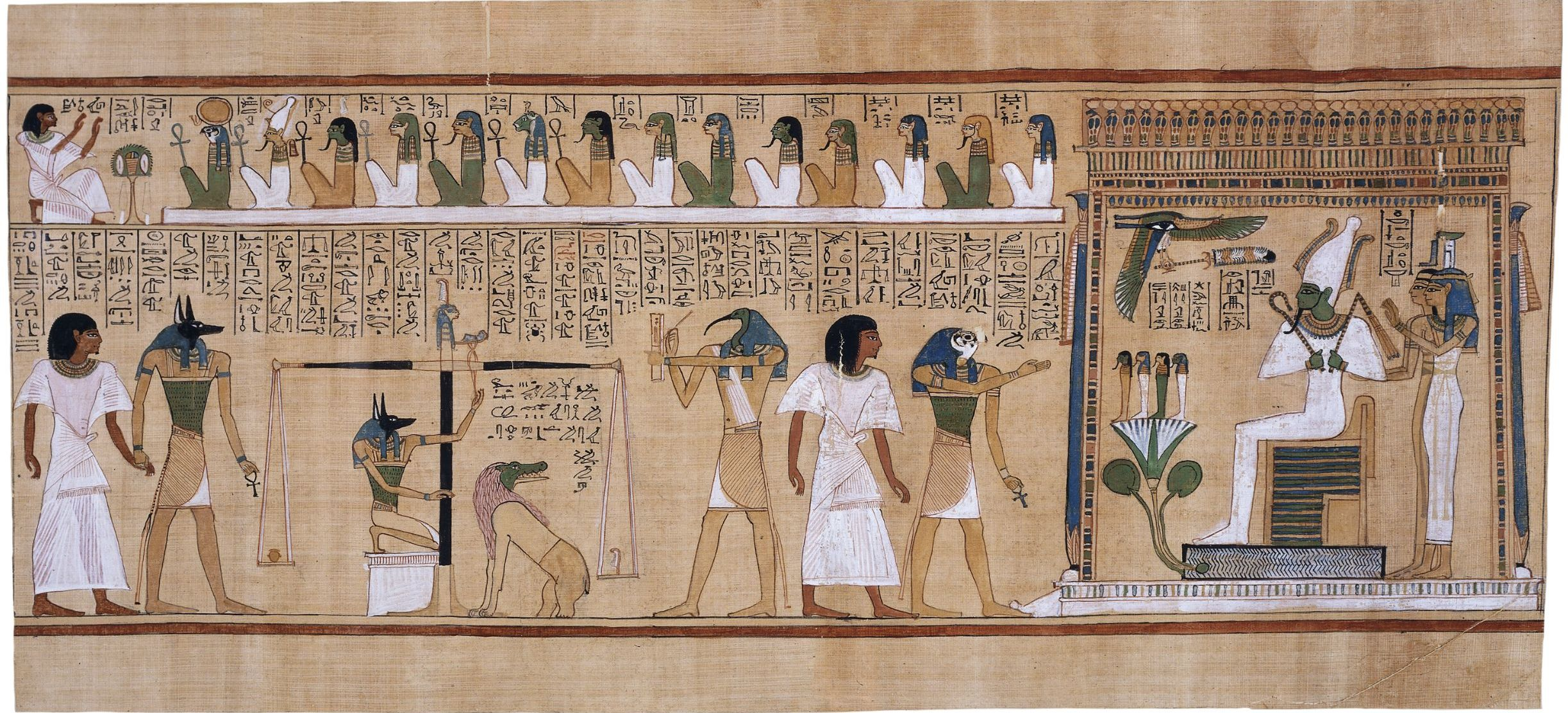
This vignette scene from the Book of the Dead of Hunefer (Nineteenth dynasty) shows his heart being weighed against the feather of truth. If his heart is lighter than the feather, he is allowed into the afterlife; if not, his heart is swallowed by Ammit.

The funerary stone slab stela was first produced during the early Old Kingdom. Usually found in mastaba tombs, they combined raised-relief artwork with inscriptions bearing the name of the deceased, their official titles (if any), and invocations.

Funerary poems were thought to preserve a monarch's soul in death. The Pyramid Texts are the earliest surviving religious literature incorporating poetic verse. These texts do not appear in tombs or pyramids originating before the reign of Unas (r. 2375–2345 BC), who had the Pyramid of Unas built at Saqqara. The Pyramid Texts are chiefly concerned with the function of preserving and nurturing the soul of the sovereign in the afterlife. This aim eventually included safeguarding both the sovereign and his subjects in the afterlife. A variety of textual traditions evolved from the original Pyramid Texts: the Coffin Texts of the Middle Kingdom, the so-called Book of the Dead, Litany of Ra, and Amduat written on papyri from the New Kingdom until the end of ancient Egyptian civilization.

Poems were also written to celebrate kingship. For example, at the Precinct of Amun-Re at Karnak, Thutmose III (r. 1479–1425 BC) of the Eighteenth dynasty erected a stela commemorating his military victories in which the gods bless Thutmose in poetic verse and ensure for him victories over his enemies. In addition to stone stelas, poems have been found on wooden writing boards used by schoolboys. Besides the glorification of kings, poems were written to honor various deities, and even the Nile.

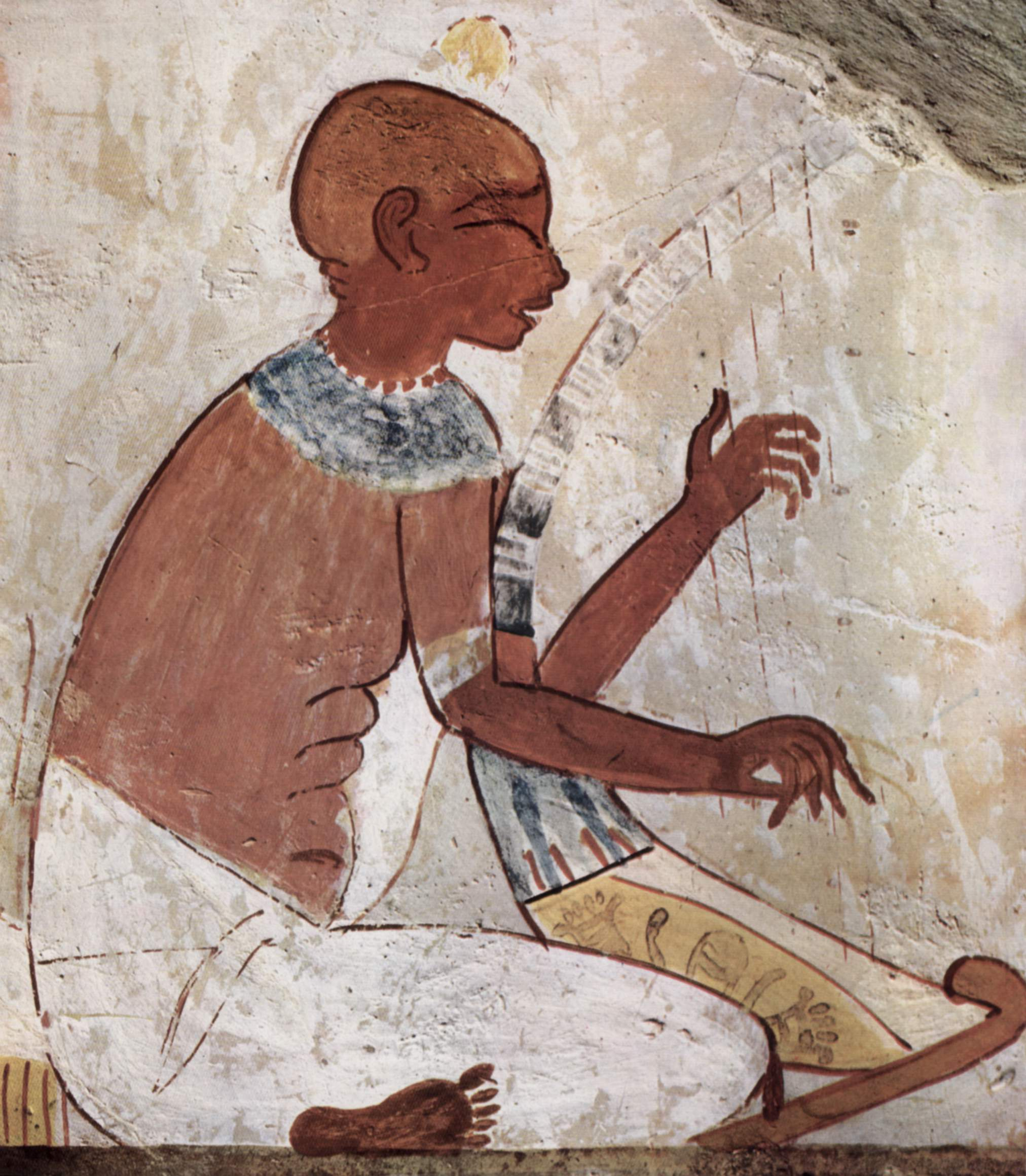
A blind harpist, from a mural of the Eighteenth dynasty of Egypt, 15th century BC

Surviving hymns and songs from the Old Kingdom include the morning greeting hymns to the gods in their respective temples. A cycle of Middle-Kingdom songs dedicated to Senusret III (r. 1878–1839 BC) have been discovered at El-Lahun. Erman considers these to be secular songs used to greet the pharaoh at Memphis, while Simpson considers them to be religious in nature but affirms that the division between religious and secular songs is not very sharp. The Harper's Song, the lyrics found on a tombstone of the Middle Kingdom and on Papyrus Harris 500 from the New Kingdom, was to be performed for dinner guests at formal banquets.

During the reign of Akhenaten (r. 1353–1336 BC), the Great Hymn to the Aten—preserved in tombs of Amarna, including the tomb of Ay—was written to the Aten, the sun-disk deity given exclusive patronage during his reign. Simpson compares this composition's wording and sequence of ideas to those of Psalm 104.

Only a single poetic hymn in the Demotic script has been preserved. However, there are many surviving examples of Late-Period Egyptian hymns written in hieroglyphs on temple walls.

No Egyptian love song has been dated from before the New Kingdom, these being written in Late Egyptian, although it is speculated that they existed in previous times. Erman compares the love songs to the Song of Songs, citing the labels "sister" and "brother" that lovers used to address each other.

=== Private letters, model letters, and epistles ===
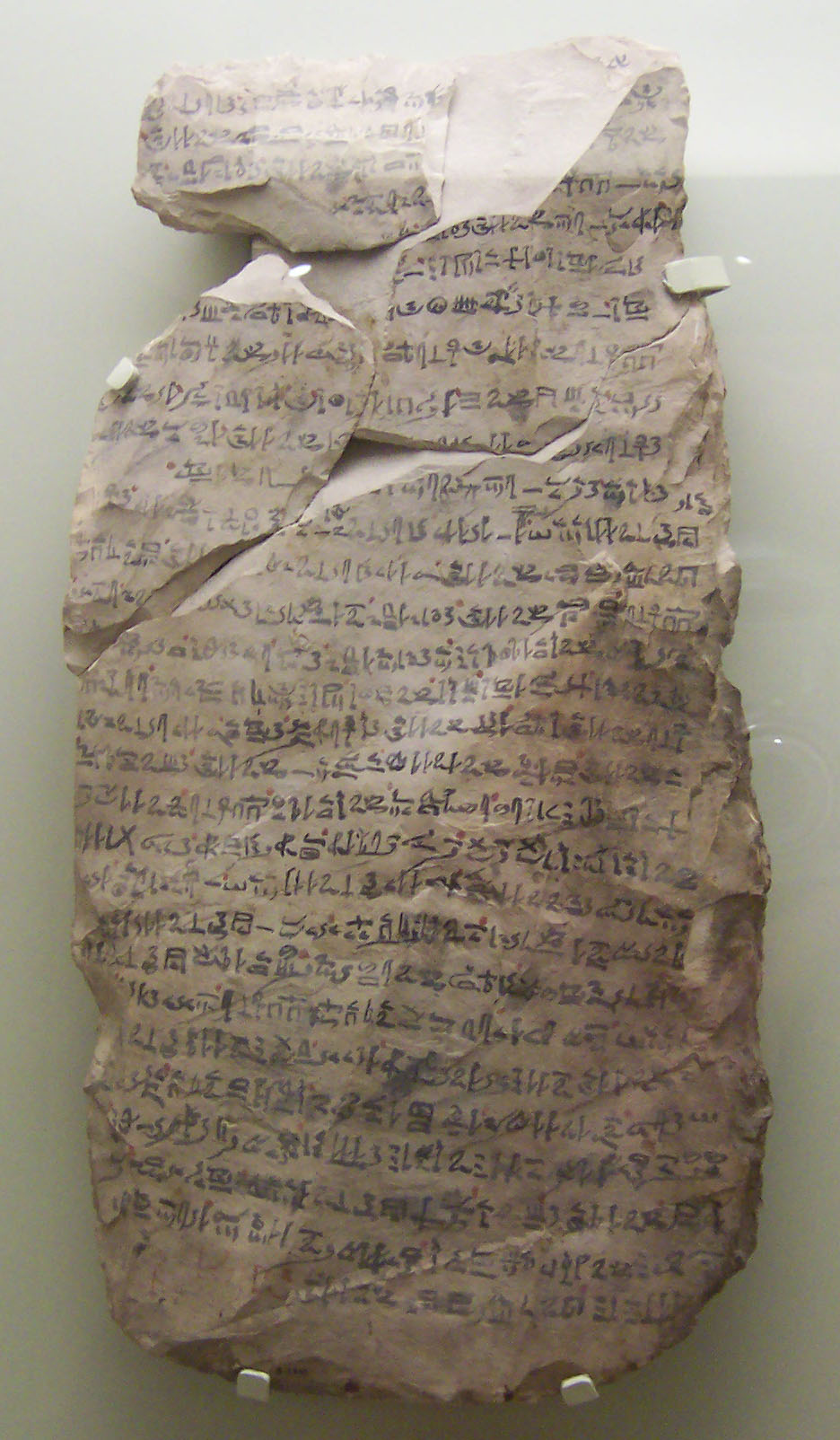
Hieratic script on an ostracon made of limestone; the script was written as an exercise by a schoolboy in Ancient Egypt. He copied four letters from the vizier Khay (who was active during the reign of Ramesses II).

The ancient Egyptian model letters and epistles are grouped into a single literary genre. Papyrus rolls sealed with mud stamps were used for long-distance letters, while ostraca were frequently used to write shorter, non-confidential letters sent to recipients located nearby. Letters of royal or official correspondence, originally written in hieratic, were sometimes given the exalted status of being inscribed on stone in hieroglyphs. The various texts written by schoolboys on wooden writing boards include model letters. Private letters could be used as epistolary model letters for schoolboys to copy, including letters written by their teachers or their families. However, these models were rarely featured in educational manuscripts; instead fictional letters found in numerous manuscripts were used. The common epistolary formula used in these model letters was "The official A. saith to the scribe B".

The oldest-known private letters on papyrus were found in a funerary temple dating to the reign of Djedkare-Izezi (r. 2414–2375 BC) of the Fifth dynasty. More letters are dated to the Sixth dynasty, when the epistle subgenre began. The educational text Book of Kemit, dated to the Eleventh dynasty, contains a list of epistolary greetings and a narrative with an ending in letter form and suitable terminology for use in commemorative biographies. Other letters of the early Middle Kingdom have also been found to use epistolary formulas similar to the Book of Kemit. The Heqanakht papyri, written by a gentleman farmer, date to the Eleventh dynasty and represent some of the lengthiest private letters known to have been written in ancient Egypt.

During the late Middle Kingdom, greater standardization of the epistolary formula can be seen, for example in a series of model letters taken from dispatches sent to the Semna fortress of Nubia during the reign of Amenemhat III (r. 1860–1814 BC). Epistles were also written during all three dynasties of the New Kingdom. While letters to the dead had been written since the Old Kingdom, the writing of petition letters in epistolary form to deities began in the Ramesside Period, becoming very popular during the Persian and Ptolemaic periods.

The epistolary Satirical Letter of Papyrus Anastasi I written during the Nineteenth dynasty was a pedagogical and didactic text copied on numerous ostraca by schoolboys. Wente describes the versatility of this epistle, which contained "proper greetings with wishes for this life and the next, the rhetoric composition, interpretation of aphorisms in wisdom literature, application of mathematics to engineering problems and the calculation of supplies for an army, and the geography of western Asia". Moreover, Wente calls this a "polemical tractate" that counsels against the rote, mechanical learning of terms for places, professions, and things; for example, it is not acceptable to know just the place names of western Asia, but also important details about its topography and routes. To enhance the teaching, the text employs sarcasm and irony.

=== Biographical and autobiographical texts ===
Catherine Parke, Professor Emerita of English and Women's Studies at the University of Missouri in Columbia, Missouri, writes that the earliest "commemorative inscriptions" belong to ancient Egypt and date to the 3rd millennium BC. She writes: "In ancient Egypt the formulaic accounts of Pharaoh's lives praised the continuity of dynastic power. Although typically written in the first person, these pronouncements are public, general testimonials, not personal utterances." She adds that as in these ancient inscriptions, the human urge to "...celebrate, commemorate, and immortalize, the impulse of life against death", is the aim of biographies written today.

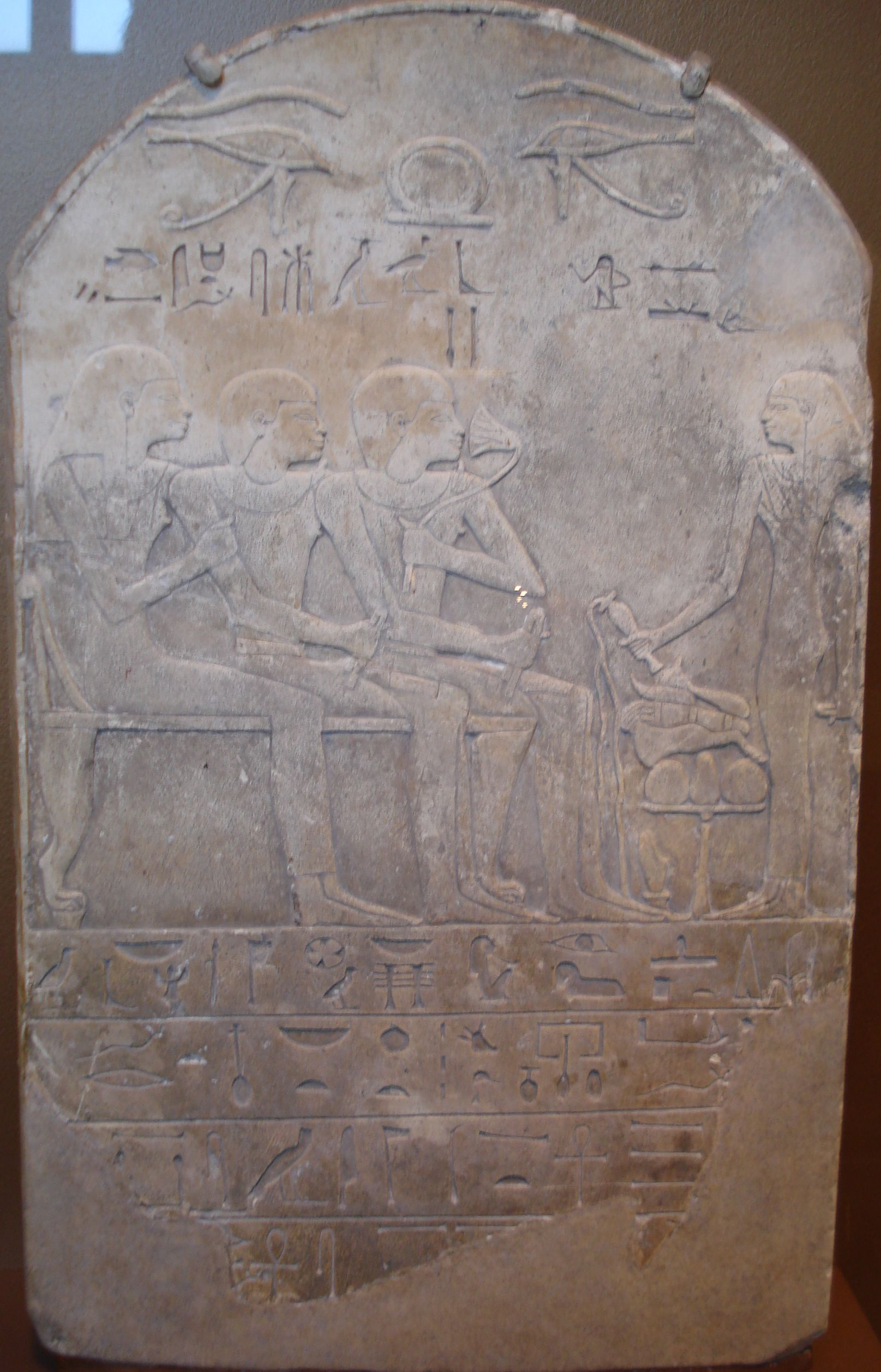
A funerary stela of a man named Ba (seated, sniffing a sacred lotus while receiving libations); Ba's son Mes and wife Iny are also seated. The identity of the libation bearer is unspecified. The stela is dated to the Eighteenth dynasty of the New Kingdom period.

Olivier Perdu, a professor of Egyptology at the Collège de France, states that biographies did not exist in ancient Egypt, and that commemorative writing should be considered autobiographical. Edward L. Greenstein, Professor of Bible at the Tel Aviv University and Bar-Ilan University, disagrees with Perdu's terminology, stating that the ancient world produced no "autobiographies" in the modern sense, and these should be distinguished from 'autobiographical' texts of the ancient world. However, both Perdu and Greenstein assert that autobiographies of the ancient Near East should not be equated with the modern concept of autobiography.

In her discussion of the Ecclesiastes of the Hebrew Bible, Jennifer Koosed, associate professor of religion at Albright College, explains that there is no solid consensus among scholars as to whether true biographies or autobiographies existed in the ancient world. One of the major scholarly arguments against this theory is that the concept of individuality did not exist until the European Renaissance, prompting Koosed to write "...thus autobiography is made a product of European civilization: Augustine begat Rosseau begat Henry Adams, and so on". Koosed asserts that the use of first-person "I" in ancient Egyptian commemorative funerary texts should not be taken literally since the supposed author is already dead. Funerary texts should be considered biographical instead of autobiographical. Koosed cautions that the term "biography" applied to such texts is problematic, since they also usually describe the deceased person's experiences of journeying through the afterlife.

Beginning with the funerary stelas for officials of the late Third dynasty, small amounts of biographical detail were added next to the deceased men's titles. However, it was not until the Sixth dynasty that narratives of the lives and careers of government officials were inscribed. Tomb biographies became more detailed during the Middle Kingdom, and included information about the deceased person's family. The vast majority of autobiographical texts are dedicated to scribal bureaucrats, but during the New Kingdom some were dedicated to military officers and soldiers. Autobiographical texts of the Late Period place a greater stress upon seeking help from deities than acting righteously to succeed in life. Whereas earlier autobiographical texts exclusively dealt with celebrating successful lives, Late Period autobiographical texts include laments for premature death, similar to the epitaphs of ancient Greece.

=== Decrees, chronicles, king lists, and histories ===
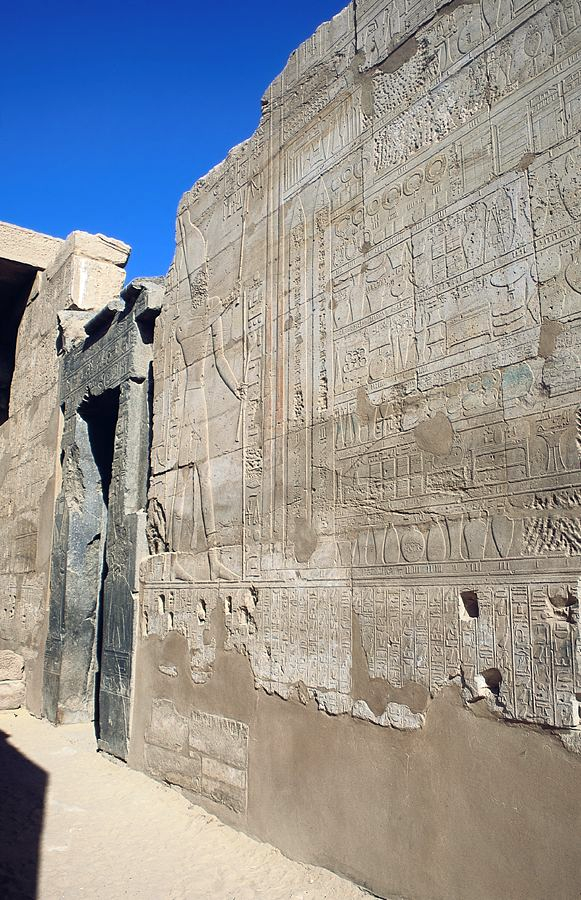
The Annals of Pharaoh Thutmose III at Karnak

Modern historians consider that some biographical—or autobiographical—texts are important historical documents. For example, the biographical stelas of military generals in tomb chapels built under Thutmose III provide much of the information known about the wars in Syria and Canaan. However, the annals of Thutmose III, carved into the walls of several monuments built during his reign, such as those at Karnak, also preserve information about these campaigns. The annals of Ramesses II (r. 1279–1213 BC), recounting the Battle of Kadesh against the Hittites include, for the first time in Egyptian literature, a narrative epic poem, distinguished from all earlier poetry that served to celebrate and instruct.

Other documents useful for investigating Egyptian history are ancient lists of kings found in terse chronicles, such as the Fifth dynasty Palermo stone. These documents legitimated the contemporary pharaoh's claim to sovereignty. Throughout ancient Egyptian history, royal decrees recounted the deeds of ruling pharaohs. For example, the Nubian pharaoh Piye (r. 752–721 BC), founder of the Twenty-fifth Dynasty, had a stela erected and written in classical Middle Egyptian that describes with unusual nuances and vivid imagery his successful military campaigns.

An Egyptian historian, known by his Greek name as Manetho (c. 3rd century BC), was the first to compile a comprehensive history of Egypt known as the Aegyptiaca. Manetho was active during the reign of Ptolemy II (r. 283–246 BC) and in part wrote in response to The Histories by the Greek Herodotus (c. 484 BC – c. 425 BC). Manetho's primary sources were likely king lists and chronicles of historic rulers, which he organized into the thirty-one dynasties of ancient Egypt still recognized today.

=== Tomb and temple graffiti ===
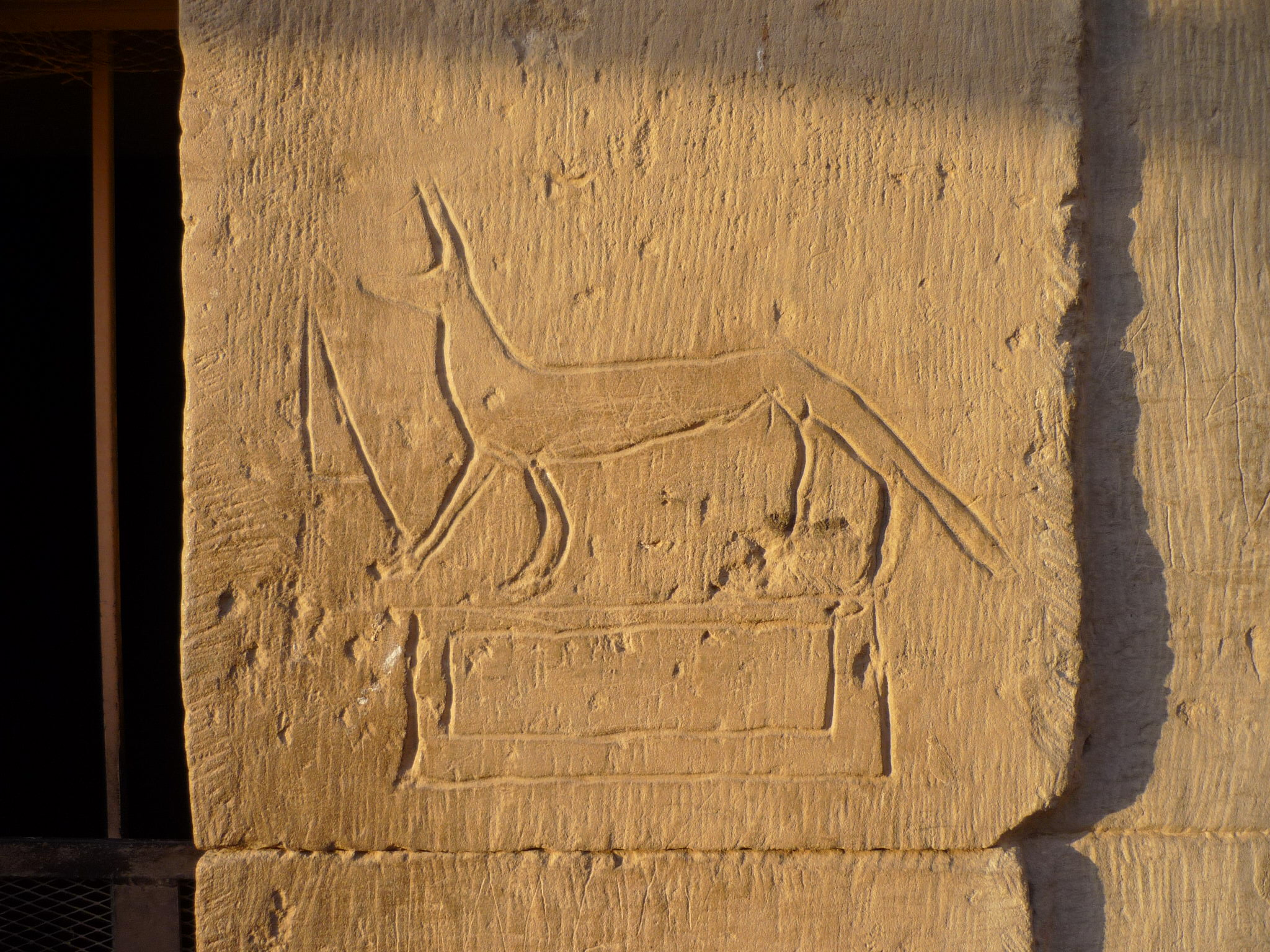
Artistic graffiti of a canine figure at the Temple of Kom Ombo, built during the Ptolemaic dynasty

Fischer-Elfert distinguishes ancient Egyptian graffiti writing as a literary genre. During the New Kingdom, scribes who traveled to ancient sites often left graffiti messages on the walls of sacred mortuary temples and pyramids, usually in commemoration of these structures. Modern scholars do not consider these scribes to have been mere tourists, but pilgrims visiting sacred sites where the extinct cult centers could be used for communicating with the gods. There is evidence from an educational ostracon found in the tomb of Senenmut (TT71) that formulaic graffiti writing was practiced in scribal schools. In one graffiti message, left at the mortuary temple of Thutmose III at Deir el-Bahri, a modified saying from The Maxims of Ptahhotep is incorporated into a prayer written on the temple wall. Scribes usually wrote their graffiti in separate clusters to distinguish their graffiti from others'. This led to competition among scribes, who would sometimes denigrate the quality of graffiti inscribed by others, even ancestors from the scribal profession.

== Legacy, translation and interpretation ==
After the Copts converted to Christianity in the first centuries AD, their Coptic literature became separated from the pharaonic and Hellenistic literary traditions. Nevertheless, scholars speculate that ancient Egyptian literature, perhaps in oral form, influenced Greek and Arabic literature. Parallels are drawn between the Egyptian soldiers sneaking into Jaffa hidden in baskets to capture the city in the story The Taking of Joppa and the Mycenaean Greeks sneaking into Troy inside the Trojan Horse. The Taking of Joppa has also been compared to the Arabic story of Ali Baba in One Thousand and One Nights. It has been conjectured that Sinbad the Sailor may have been inspired by the pharaonic Tale of the Shipwrecked Sailor. Some Egyptian literature was commented on by scholars of the ancient world. For example, the Jewish Roman historian Josephus (37 – c. 100 AD) quoted and provided commentary on Manetho's historical texts.

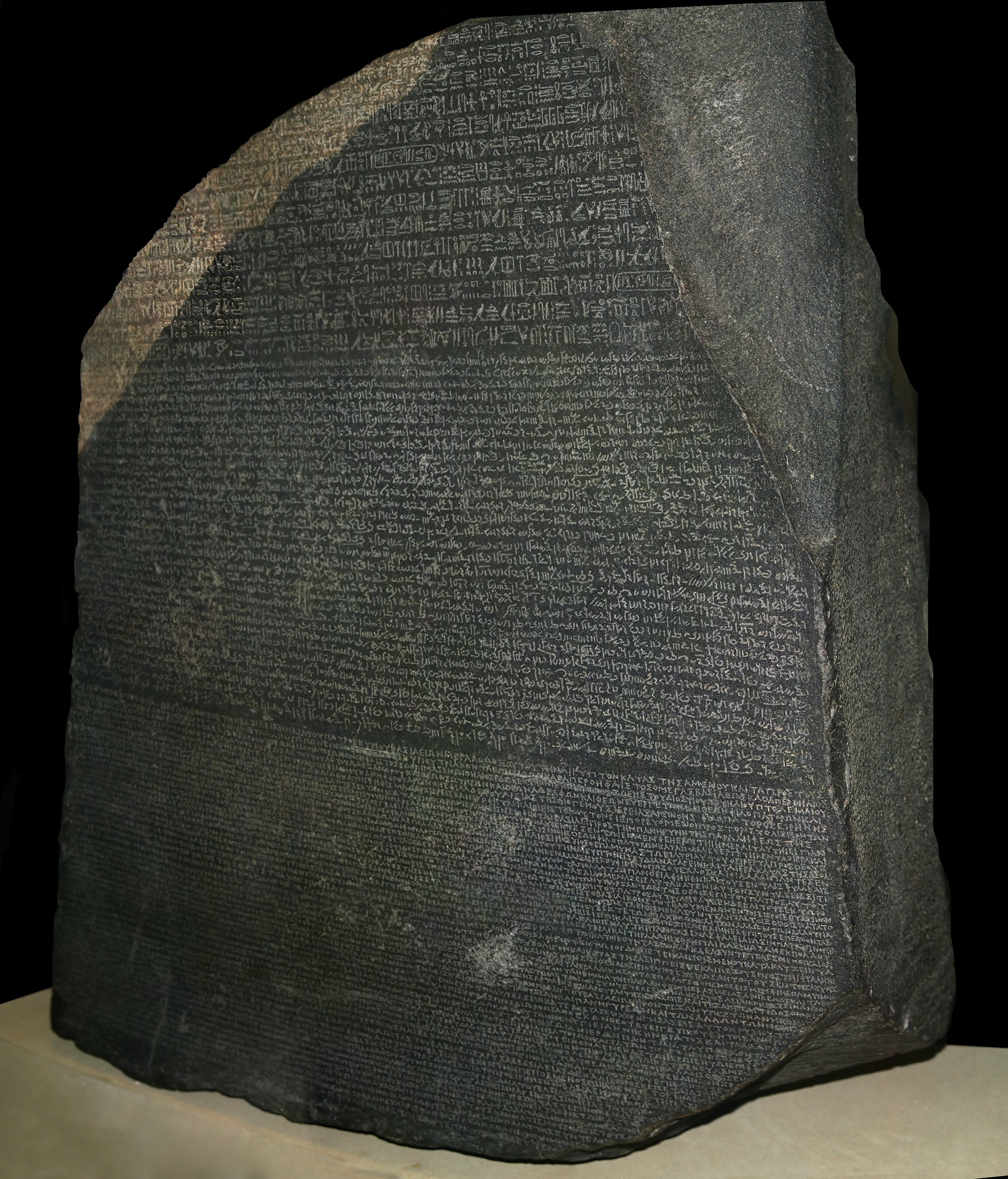
The trilingual Rosetta Stone in the British Museum

The most recently carved hieroglyphic inscription of ancient Egypt known today is found in a temple of Philae, dated precisely to 394 AD during the reign of Theodosius I (r. 379–395 AD). In the 4th century AD, the Hellenized Egyptian Horapollo compiled a survey of almost two hundred Egyptian hieroglyphs and provided his interpretation of their meanings, although his understanding was limited and he was unaware of the phonetic uses of each hieroglyph. This survey was apparently lost until 1415, when the Italian Cristoforo Buondelmonti acquired it at the island of Andros. Athanasius Kircher (1601–1680) was the first in Europe to realize that Coptic was a direct linguistic descendant of ancient Egyptian. In his Oedipus Aegyptiacus, he made the first concerted European effort to interpret the meaning of Egyptian hieroglyphs, albeit based on symbolic inferences.

It was not until 1799, with the Napoleonic discovery of a trilingual (i.e. hieroglyphic, Demotic, Greek) stela inscription on the Rosetta Stone, that modern scholars had the resources to decipher Egyptian texts. The key breakthroughs were made more than twenty years later, in the work of Jean-François Champollion in deciphering hieroglyphs and Thomas Young in deciphering Demotic. By the time of Champollion's death in 1832, it was possible to discern the general sense of Egyptian texts. The first scholar able to read an Egyptian text in full was Emmanuel de Rougé, who published the first translations of Egyptian literary texts in 1856.

Before the 1970s, scholarly consensus was that ancient Egyptian literature—although sharing similarities with modern literary categories—was not an independent discourse, uninfluenced by the ancient sociopolitical order. However, from the 1970s onwards, a growing number of historians and literary scholars have questioned this theory. While scholars before the 1970s treated ancient Egyptian literary works as viable historical sources that accurately reflected the conditions of this ancient society, scholars now caution against this approach. Scholars are increasingly using a multifaceted hermeneutic approach to the study of individual literary works, in which not only the style and content, but also the cultural, social and historical context of the work are taken into account. Individual works can then be used as case studies for reconstructing the main features of ancient Egyptian literary discourse.
