= Loyalist Teaching =

Ancient Egyptian text

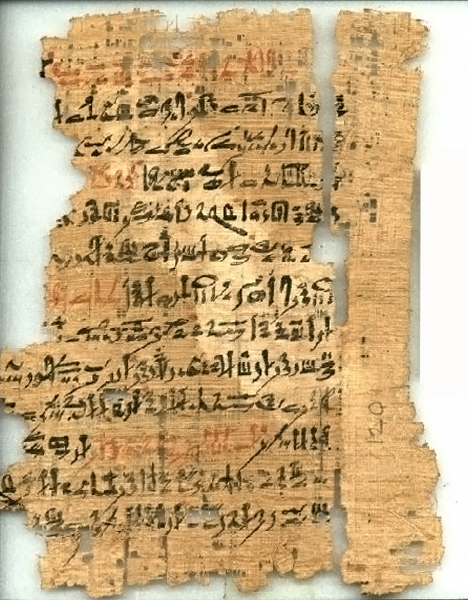
1550–1069 BC copy of the scripture written in hieratic script

The Loyalist Teaching, or The Loyalist Instructions, is an ancient Egyptian text of the sebayt ('teaching') genre. It survives in part from a stela inscription of the mid Twelfth dynasty of Egypt. The whole text can be found in papyrus scrolls of the New Kingdom period. Its authorship is uncertain, although it has been suggested (with no direct evidence) that it was written by the vizier Kairsu of the early Twelfth dynasty. The text emphasizes the virtues of loyalty to the ruling pharaoh and the responsibilities one must maintain for the sake of society.

== Sources ==
The first half of The Loyalist Teaching is found on a Twelfth-dynasty biographical stela at Abydos made in honor of Sehetepibre, a high government official and seal-bearer who served under the Pharaohs Senusret III (r. 1878–1839 BC) and Amenemhat III (r. 1860–1814 BC; overlapping reign dates due to coregency). The full version of this Middle-Kingdom-era text only survives in New-Kingdom-era copies. These include a tablet of the early Eighteenth dynasty of Egypt, the Louvre Papyrus dated to the second half of the Eighteenth dynasty, a papyrus of the Ramesside Period (i.e. Nineteenth and Twentieth dynasties), and over twenty ostraca fragments dated to the Ramesside Period.

== Content ==
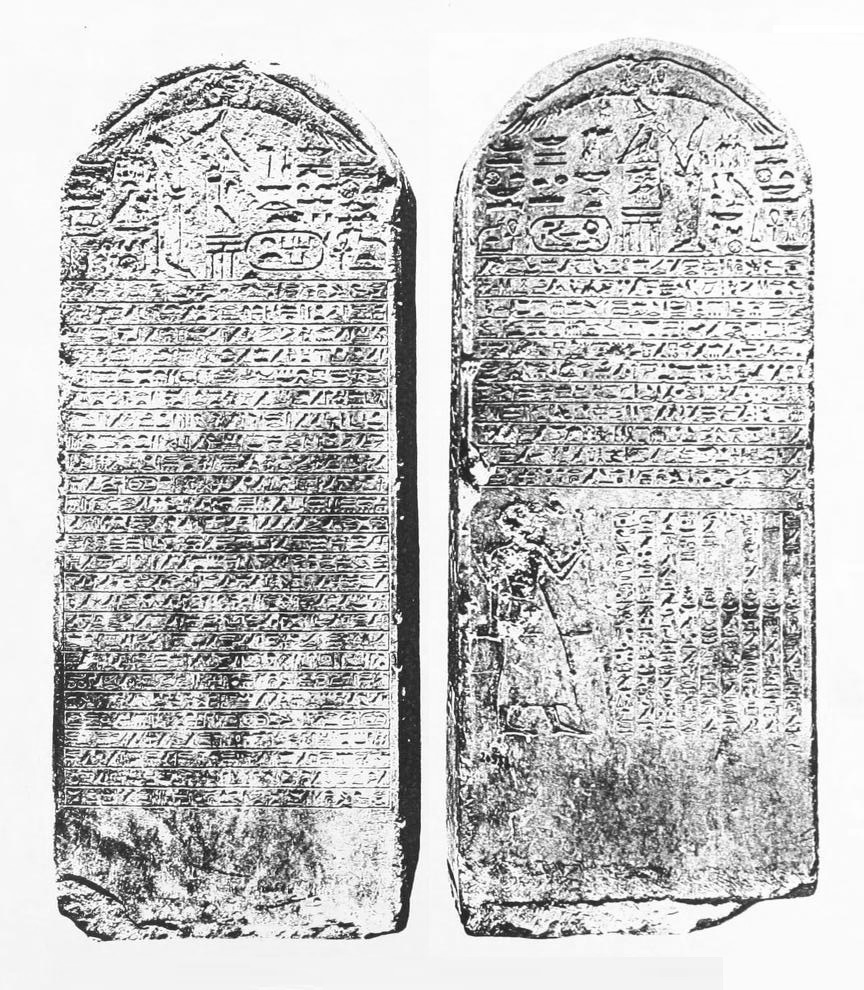
The stela for Sehetepibre, containing the first part of the Loyalist Teaching (CG 20538).

The full text of The Loyalist Teaching comprises approximately 145 verses. It can be divided into two distinguishable sections. In the first, the teacher instructs his children that they must always respect and obey the pharaoh of Egypt, who is given praise. It is made clear that the pharaoh will destroy his enemies, but his supporters will be cared for. William Kelly Simpson—a professor emeritus of Egyptology at Yale University—asserts that The Loyalist Teaching can be classified under the Egyptian "literature of propaganda" that extols the virtues of the king. This is in contrast to works of the "literature of pessimism," such as the contemporaneous Prophecy of Neferti, which describe a time of chaos and a need to reestablish values that ensure a stable society. In the second section of The Loyalist Teaching, the author of the text instructs his children that they must also respect the common people and uphold their allotted duties in society. This includes duties of the landowner, who must not abuse his tenants lest they abandon and thus impoverish him.

Richard B. Parkinson—a curator at the British Museum—speculates that the protagonist speaker in the text is a vizier, yet the speaker's name is edited out of Sehetepibre's stela and also does not appear in later copies. Since Sehetepibre's stela was modeled after that of the vizier Montuhotep—who served during the reign of Senusret I (r. 1971-1926 BC)—it has been conjectured by scholars that Montuhotep was the author of The Loyalist Teaching, although Parkinson affirms that there is no evidence to support the claim. According to the linguistic analysis of Pascal Vernus—a professor of linguistics and Directeur d’études at the École pratique des hautes études of the University of Paris—the text should be roughly dated to the reign of Senusret I.

== Bibliography ==
- Fischer-Elfert, Hans-Werner (1999). Die Lehre eines Mannes für seinen Sohn: eine Etappe auf dem "Gottesweg" des loyalen und solidarischen Beamten der frühen 12. Dynastie. Ägyptologische Abhandlungen 60. Harrassowitz (Wiesbaden). ISBN 3-447-03919-1.
- Parkinson, Richard B. (2002). Poetry and Culture in Middle Kingdom Egypt: A Dark Side to Perfection. London: Continuum. ISBN 0-8264-5637-5.
- Posener, Georges. (1976). L'Enseignement loyaliste: sagesse égyptienne du Moyen Empire. Geneva: Librairie Droz.
- Simpson, William Kelly. (1972). The Literature of Ancient Egypt: An Anthology of Stories, Instructions, and Poetry. Edited by William Kelly Simpson. Translations by R.O. Faulkner, Edward F. Wente, Jr., and William Kelly Simpson. New Haven and London: Yale University Press. ISBN 0-300-01482-1.
- Simpson, William Kelly. (1991). "Mentuhotep, Vizier of Sesostris I, Patron of Art and Architecture," MDAIK 47: 331-40.
- Verhoeven, Ursula (2009). Von der „Loyalistischen Lehre" zur „Lehre des Kairsu", in: Zeitschrift für ägyptische Sprache und Altertumskunde 136 (2009), 87-98. (online: http://archiv.ub.uni-heidelberg.de/propylaeumdok/volltexte/2012/1353/pdf/Verhoeven_Von_der_Loyalistischen_Lehre_2009.pdf).
- Vernus, Pascal. (1990). Future at Issue, Tense, Mood and Aspect in Middle Egyptian: Studies in Syntax and Semantics. Oxford: Aris & Phillips Ltd. ISBN 978-0-85668-587-3.
- Weeks, Stuart. (1999). Early Israelite Wisdom. Oxford: Oxford University Press. ISBN 0-19-826750-9.
