= Oracle of the Lamb =

Ancient Egyptian prophetic text

The Oracle of the Lamb is an ancient Egyptian prophetic text written on a papyrus in Demotic Egyptian and dated to the thirty-third year of the reign of the Roman Emperor Augustus (r. 27 BC – 14 AD). In it, a lamb speaks and provides prophecies to a man named Pasenhor. The lamb describes a world turned upside-down and reduced to chaos: temples are in disarray, the ruler has now become the ruled, and the Medes (i.e. referring to the Persian domination of Egypt) have come to destroy Egypt. It also mentions that the Greeks (i.e. referring to the Ptolemaic domination of Egypt) will take the White Crown (representing pharaonic Upper Egypt). The story is comparable in style, tone, and subject matter to prophetic texts of the Middle Kingdom of Egypt, such as the Prophecy of Neferti.

== See also ==
- Demotic Chronicle
- Oracle of the Potter
