= Book of Kemyt =

Ancient Egyptian scribal training composition

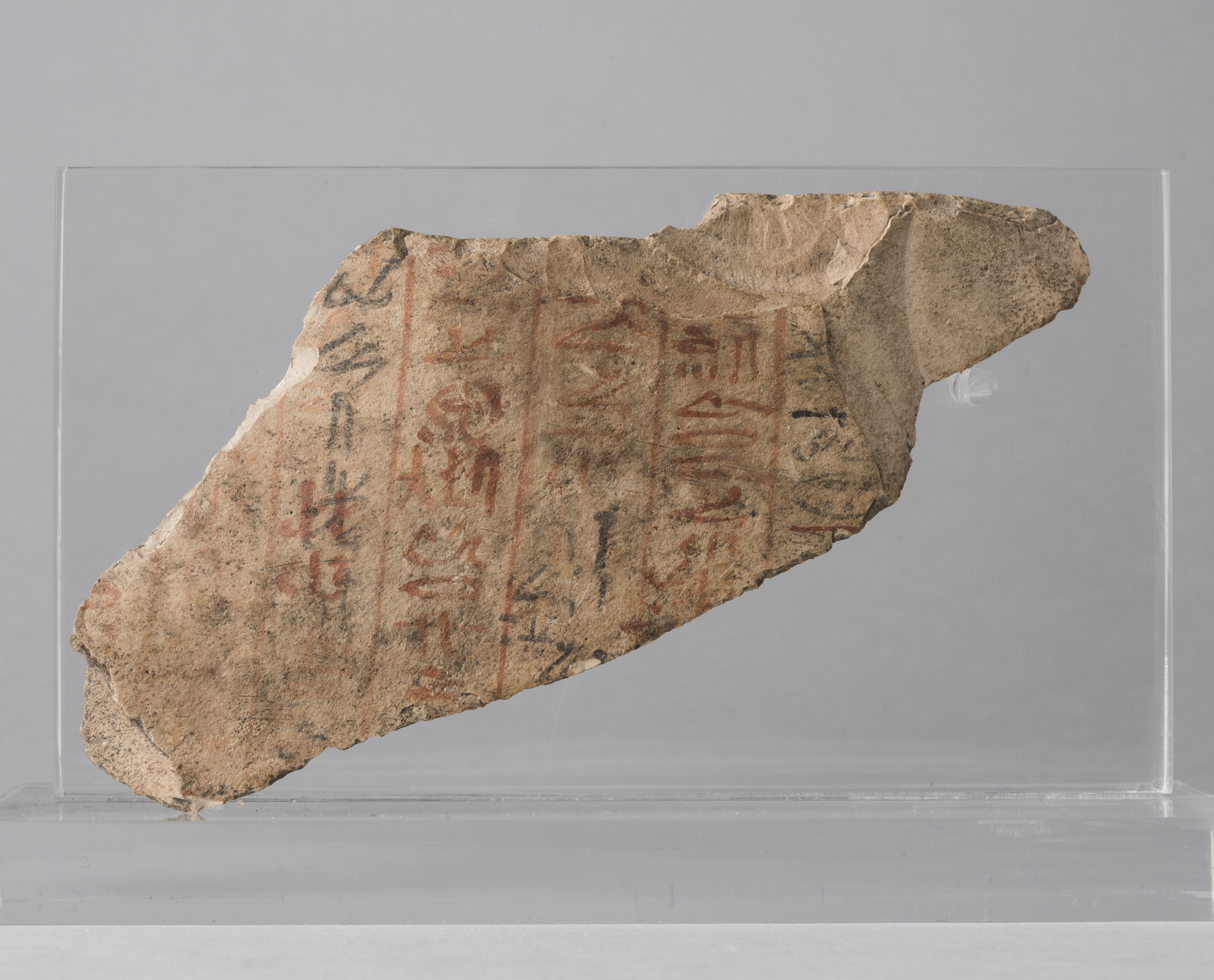
- Hieratic ostracon with excerpts from the composition known as "Kemyt", limestone (Museo Egizio, Turin P. 1387)
- Original title: Kemyt
- Language: Middle Egyptian
- Genre: Scribal training text; letter-like composition
- Publication date: Middle Kingdom; exact date uncertain

The Book of Kemyt (often shortened to Kemyt and also described as the Kemyt-book) is an ancient Egyptian literary composition written in Middle Egyptian. It is a letter-like text associated with the education and practical training of scribes.

The conventional name derives from the Egyptian word kmyt, interpreted as "the compilation"; the identification of that ancient title with the surviving composition remains conjectural. The precise date of composition is uncertain: its language and vocabulary point to the Middle Kingdom, while a reference to the royal Residence in section 17 has been interpreted as suggesting a date after the establishment of Itjtawy, late in the reign of Amenemhat I of the Twelfth Dynasty. Surviving textual witnesses range from the late Middle Kingdom to the end of the New Kingdom, with a large proportion consisting of Ramesside ostraca.

The composition formed part of the scribal curriculum and was apparently intended to introduce apprentices to a distinctive writing style, including conventional letter formulae and the spelling of words. Analysis of its surviving copies indicates that it was transcribed by writers ranging from beginning students and assistant scribes to early-career and senior scribes.

== Contents and form ==
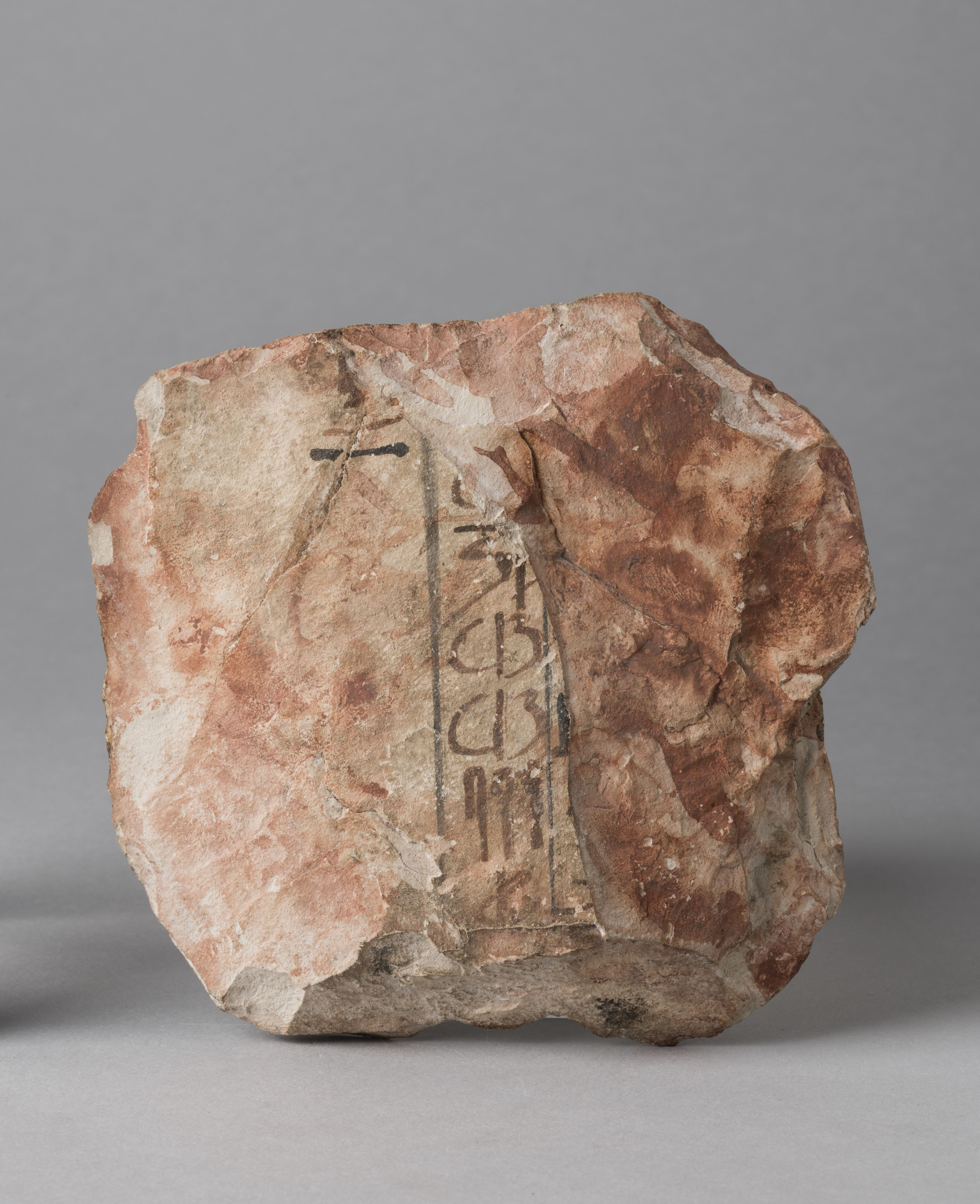
Hieroglyphic ostracon containing extracts from Kemyt, dated to 1292–1076 BC; Museo Egizio, Turin, P. 1382.

The composition contains sections reflecting the formulae and cultural material of epistolary, narrative, autobiographical and wisdom genres. Its first part contains formulaic phrases used in letters, sometimes called the Memphite Formula, whereas the later portion is more miscellaneous.

Modern synoptic editions divide the text into seventeen paragraphs, a division that reflects semantic units and paragraph endings marked by the ancient scribes. Copies of Kemyt are distinguished by a predominantly columnar layout and an archaizing script recalling early Middle Kingdom cursive writing. This vertical arrangement remained characteristic of the composition during the New Kingdom, when linear writing had otherwise become usual on papyri and ostraca.

The columns could be separated by vertical guidelines in black or red ink, while changes between the two colours were used to distinguish particular textual units, opening phrases or colophons.

== Manuscripts and scribal use ==
Approximately 500 partial copies of the Book of Kemyt are known on papyrus, walls, wooden or limestone writing boards and ostraca, although only five preserve almost the entire composition. Ostraca constitute the great majority of the surviving witnesses, many of which are Ramesside examples associated with western Thebes and Deir el-Medina.

One surviving example is a limestone ostracon in the Museo Egizio, inventory number Provv. 1382, inscribed in hieroglyphic writing with extracts from the composition. The object is dated to 1292–1076 BC, between the Nineteenth and Twentieth Dynasties, and comes from Deir el-Medina, where it was recovered during excavations directed by Ernesto Schiaparelli.

== See also ==
- Ancient Egyptian literature
- The Maxims of Ptahhotep
- Scribe

== Sources ==
- Motte, Aurore (2024). "Learning Through Practice: On How Kemyt Contributed to Crafting and Transmitting Scribal Knowledge" (PDF). Zeitschrift für Ägyptische Sprache und Altertumskunde. 151 (1): 92–109. doi:10.1515/zaes-2022-0005. ISSN 0044-216X.
