= Petiese =

Petiese (alt. Peteese, Pediese) was the name of a number of high ancient Egyptian officials who served the pharaohs during the seventh and sixth centuries BCE. Their family history is known from a petition (pRylands 9), which the priest Petiese (referred to below as Petiese III) wrote during the reign of Darius I of Persia, although some have claimed that, rather than a real petition, this is a work of literature or at best a draft for a petition.

== The Petition of Petiese ==
Petiese I, son of Ireturu, administered Upper Egypt jointly with his cousin Petiese, son of Ankhshesheq, who held the position of Ships Master. In 651 BCE he had his priestly offices confirmed by Psamtik I, above all that of prophet of Amun of Teudjoi. After he had resigned from his powerful office of administrator of Upper Egypt, the priests of Teudjoi decided in 621 to wrest his priestly offices, which were well paid, from him and killed two of his grandsons. Pediese received police protection. He restored the fortunes of the temple at Teudjoi. Pediese's rights were inscribed on a stela. He signed over his prophet's portion to his son Wedjasematawi I.

In 591, Petiese II, son of Wedjasematawi I, accompanied Psamtik II on a campaign to Syria. While he was away, the priests of Teudjoi bribed an official and Petiese on his return lost his case against the priests in court.

After his death, his son Wedjasematawi II had to flee from Teudjoi as the priests tried to force him to sign over his rights to them. They destroyed his house in his absence, but had to pay a small compensation when Petiese III, the son of Wedjasematawi II, brought an action against them.

If the petition of Petiese III is to be believed there was little justice in the Egypt of his time and only bribery brought results.
