= Oracle of the Potter =

Egyptian prophetic text

The Oracle of the Potter is a Hellenistic Egyptian prophetic text, originally written in Demotic Egyptian in the 3rd century BC. However, there are only five remaining Greek manuscript copies of the document on papyrus (parts of two manuscripts were rewritten, likely in the 2nd century BC following the failed rebellion of Harsiesis in 132–130 BC) dated to the 2nd or 3rd centuries AD during the Roman rule of Egypt. A potter is the prophet and protagonist of the story, an allusion to Khnum, the "Lord of the potter's wheel" who fashioned the world in Egyptian mythology. The text was composed as anti-Ptolemaic propaganda: the potter tells the king Amenophis/Amenhotep, who writes everything down and reveals it to all men, of the future chaos and destruction that will follow the unfair, foreign rule of the Typhon/Set-worshipping "beltwearers" (Greeks) whose city (Alexandria) will be deserted when they kill each other in the troubled times. Hephaestus/Ptah will return to Memphis along with Agathos Daimon/Shai (the patron god of Alexandria) who will abandon the beltwearers' city.

The story is comparable in style, tone, and subject matter to prophetic texts of the Middle Kingdom of Egypt, such as the Prophecy of Neferti.

== See also ==
- Oracle of the Lamb
