= Tale of the Shipwrecked Sailor =

Ancient Egyptian story

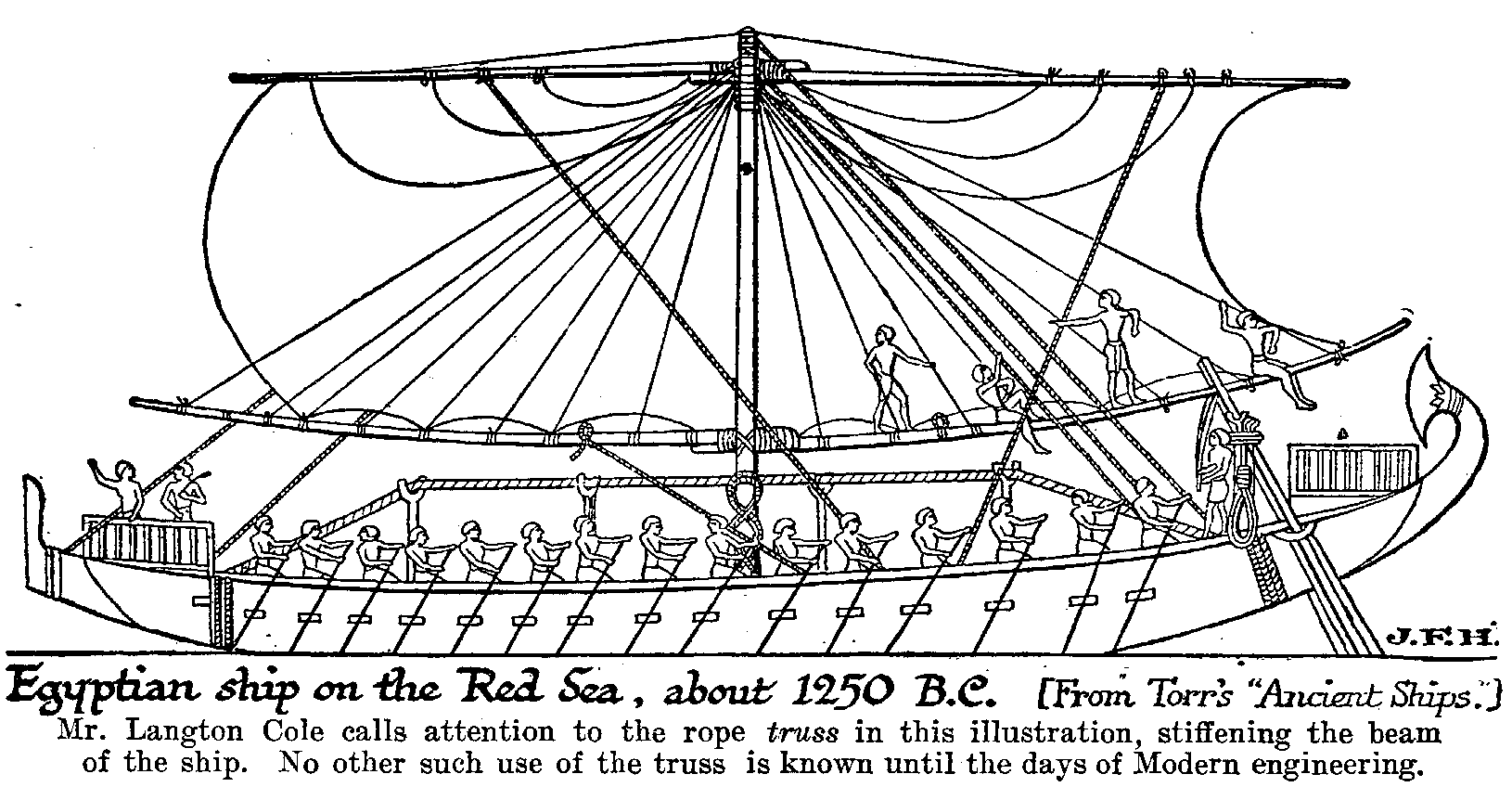
Egyptian ship on the Red Sea, about 1250 BCE

The "Tale of the Shipwrecked Sailor" is a Middle Kingdom story of an Ancient Egyptian voyage to "the King's mines". During a storm, the boat is destroyed, and all but one sailor perish. The sailor finds himself on an island and meets a large snake, the last of his species. They converse, and the shipwrecked sailor leaves the island and returns to the king.

== Historical information ==
E. A. Wallis Budge's "The Literature of the Ancient Egyptians", published in 1914, states that the papyrus that contained the story was located within the Imperial Library at St. Petersburg. Miriam Lichtheim's "Ancient Egyptian Literature Vol I", published in 1973, reiterates this, further stating that the papyrus, called P. Leningrad 1115, was now in Moscow. Lichtheim also states that the papyrus was discovered by Vladimir Golenishchev in the Imperial Hermitage of St. Petersburg and that it dated to the Middle Kingdom. In 1911 a French Egyptologist Gaston Maspero states that Golenishchev discovered the papyrus in 1880, and brought to the attention of scholars at the 5th International Congress of Orientalists in Berlin, in 1881. He published the full translation into French in 1881 and issued a full photo typical edition in 1913.

The scribe who copied it, and who claimed to be "excellent of fingers" ("cunning of fingers") despite having made a few slips in the copying, is known as Amenaa, or Ameni-amenna. The signature of Amenaa was mentioned in the 1987 edition of The Guinness Book of Records as the oldest surviving signature on a papyrus.

== Synopsis ==
The tale begins with a retainer (šmsw) announcing or stating his return from a voyage at sea. He is returning from an apparently failed expedition and is anxious about how the king will receive him. An attendant reassures him, advising him on how to behave before the king, and repeating the proverb, "The mouth of a man saves him." To encourage his master, he tells a tale of a previous voyage of his in which he overcame disaster, including meeting with a god and the king.

The sailor of a ship manned by 120 sailors fell overboard when a sudden wind caused the waves to be eight cubits high and was washed up on an island. There he finds shelter and food (he says "there was nothing that was not there"). While making a burnt offering to the gods, he hears thunder and feels the earth shake and sees a giant serpent approach him. The serpent asks him three times who had brought him to the island. When the sailor cannot answer, the serpent takes him to where it lives and asks the question three times more. The sailor repeats his story, now saying that he was on a mission for the king.

The serpent tells him not to fear and that the gods have let him live and brought him to the island, and that after four months on the island he will be rescued by sailors he knows and will return home. The serpent then relates a tragedy that had happened to him, saying that he had been on the island with 74 of his kin plus a daughter, and that a star fell and "they went up in flames through it". In some translations, the daughter survives; in others, she perishes with the rest. The serpent advises the sailor to be brave and to control his heart, and if he does so, he will return to his family.

The sailor now promises the serpent that he will tell the king of the serpent's power and will send the serpent many valuable gifts, including myrrh and other incense. Laughing at him, the serpent says that the sailor is not rich, but that he (the serpent) is Lord of Punt and that the island is rich in incense, and that when the sailor leaves he will not see the island again as it will become water. His ship arrives to rescue him, and the serpent asks him to "make me a good name in your town" and gives him many precious gifts, including spices, incense, elephants' tusks, greyhounds and baboons.

The sailor returns home and gives the king the gifts he took from the island, and the king makes him an attendant and gives him serfs. The tale ends with the master telling the narrator, "Do not make the excellent (that is, do not act arrogantly) my friend; why give water to a goose (literally, bird) at dawn before its slaughtering in the morning?"

== Commentary and analysis ==
For some, it is a transparent tale intended as a source of inspiration or reassurance for the noble mind, perhaps similar to something like a courtly creation intended for the royal ear or for the consideration of aristocrats. Another interpretation of the story ascribes the narrative more complexity and depth, rather than viewing it as a simple tale of the folk tradition. According to this stance, a shipwrecked traveller engages upon a spiritual endeavour (or quest), journeying through the cosmos, to meet a primordial god, providing to the traveller a gift of moral vision with which to return to Egypt. Further, Richard Mathews writes that this "oldest fantasy text contains archetypal narrative of the genre: an uninitiated hero on a sea journey is thrown off course by a storm, encounters an enchanted island, confronts a monster, and survives, wiser for the experience," commenting additionally that the monster (snake) is the prototype for "the greatest fantasy monster of all time – the dragon, sometimes called the 'wurm'."

The tale itself begins with a framing device in which an attendant or "follower" (conventionally—although not in the papyrus—referred to as "the sailor") tries to comfort his master ("Mayor", although it has been suggested that they might be of equal status), who is returning from an apparently failed expedition and is anxious about how the king will receive him.

The language of the tale is very colourful. In some places there is rhythmical prose, for example

We have reached the borders of the country Vavat

We passed beside the isle Senmut,

We happily returned

And reached our land.

The author of the tale also used alliterations, for example

Maa sen pet / They looked at the sky

Maa sen ta / They looked at the land

Mak ibsen / Their hearts were

Er maut / more brave than in lions.
