= Letters to the dead =

Corpus of ancient Egyptian texts found from the Old Kingdom through to the Late Period

Letters to the Dead are a corpus of ancient Egyptian texts found from the Old Kingdom through to the Late Period. They address a deceased relative asking for help with problems of inheritance, illness or fertility.

== Form ==
Letters to the Dead have been found on a range of materials, such as bowls, figurines, linen, papyrus, a jar stand, ostraca and stone stelae. Both men and women could be the petitioners or the deceased recipients of letters. They generally included some or all of the following components:

- Addressing the deceased by name, and often title and relationship to the petitioner,
- Greeting the deceased which took "the form of an offering formula, well-wishing, or other invocation"
- Stating the problem, which was often either inheritance, illness or fertility based,
- Petitioning for the desired outcome.

There is contention as to the exact number of extant letters, with numbers ranging from nineteen to twenty-four.

== Find locations ==
Many of the Letters to the Dead have unknown provenance. However, of those that do, are found in cemeteries and tombs. One such example is the Qau Bowl, which was found at the head end of a burial chamber in Qau tomb 7695 along with two other uninscribed pottery vessels.

== Examples ==
=== The Qau Bowl (Petrie Museum, UCL 16163) ===
The Qau bowl, now found in the Petrie Museum, UCL, includes two letters, on the inside and outside of the vessel. It is dated to First Intermediate Period. Both letters are written by Shepsi, one to his mother and the other to his father. On the inside of the bowl, Shepsi requests help from his father on a matter of inheritance, and on the outside to his mother on a matter of protection from illness.

- External link to the translation of the Qau Bowl

=== Papyrus Brooklyn (Brooklyn Museum, 37.1799 E) ===
The Papyrus Brooklyn, now found in the Brooklyn Museum, New York, is dated to the Late Period and is a petition from a temple worker of the temple of Amun on an issue of inheritance. It is inscribed with nineteen lines of abnormal hieratic on one side, and one line on the reverse.

- External link to images of Papyrus Brooklyn
