= Memphite Formula =

The Memphite Formula was a standardized greeting of First Intermediate Period and early Middle Kingdom ancient Egyptian letters, which fell out of use in the early Twelfth Dynasty.

== Form ==
S34 U29 s
Life, Prosperity, Health
in hieroglyphs

Letters written in the Memphite Formula begin with a greeting from "the servant", the author, to "the lord", the recipient. Use of the third person is strictly observed in the greeting, and can be preserved throughout the entire body of the text, although often in the body of the letter "I" and "you" will be used as well. The symbol for "lord" contains the seated-man hieroglyph, which is often used as the determinative for humans, but can also be used as the possessive pronoun, "my". Accordingly, Alan Gardiner had suggested that greetings from this class of letters be translated "to my lord", in accordance with later Egyptian letters, which often address the recipient in the first person. Battiscombe Gunn countered that if the author of the letter introduced himself in the third person, as "the servant", it would be difficult to switch to the first person in the same sentence, and that the informality of New Kingdom letters should not be read back upon the earlier conventions. Gardiner later accepted this interpretation.

Connected to the word lord is usually found a common exhortation or blessing, "may he live, be prosperous, be healthy", which is commonly abbreviated l.p.h. in translations for convenience. This blessing is usually understood to be an example of the Egyptian old perfective or stative tense, and one of the few remaining instances where a non-first-person stative can be used in an independent clause.

The Memphite Formula blesses the recipient in the name of Ptah and the principal god of the letter's author.

== History ==
The Memphite formula was common in the First Intermediate Period and the beginning of the Middle Kingdom. Its use was so standard that frequently it would be written in advance on sheets of papyrus intended for use as letters. While the early Middle Kingdom convention has been termed the Memphite Formula, all letters in the Memphite style which have established provenance come only from Thebes. The Memphite Formula did not see use long into the Middle Kingdom, being replaced with the set formula, "a communication to the master, l.p.h."
