= King Neferkare and General Sasenet =

Ancient Egyptian story

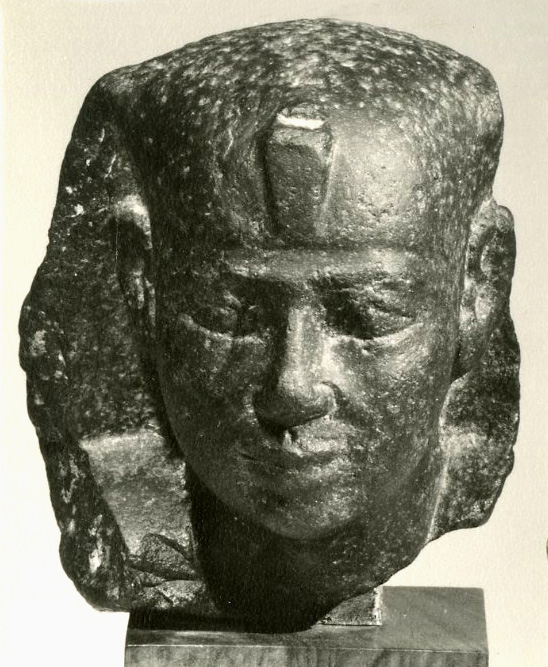
Royal head from a small statue, black stone, Reign of Pepi II, Metropolitan Museum of Art, New York, 66.99.152

The ancient Egyptian story of "King Neferkare and General Sasenet" survives only in fragments. It is often cited by people interested in Homosexuality in ancient Egypt as being proof that a homosexual relationship existed between a pharaoh and one of his officers. On the other hand, literature often reflects social mores: the tale is censorious of the king's conduct which may well reflect the attitude of the people towards homosexuality. It purports to describe the nightly exploits of Pepi II Neferkare; some like R. S. Bianchi think that it is a work of archaizing literature and dates to the 25th Dynasty referring to Shabaka Neferkare, a Kushite pharaoh.

The story is dated to the late New Kingdom though it was composed earlier. Only three sources for it survive, each containing only a part of the overall narrative:

- a wooden plaque, 18th or 19th Dynasty, now in the Institute for the Study of Ancient Cultures the University of Chicago
- an ostrakon, 20th dynasty, from Deir el-Medina
- the Papyrus Chassinat I, also known as Papyrus Louvre E 25351, 25th dynasty, now in the Louvre, Paris

It contains a reference to the ancient myth of the sun god Rê and the god of the realm of the dead Osiris. These two gods existed in a relationship of interdependence: Osiris needing the light of the sun while Re, who had to cross the underworld during the night to reach the eastern horizon in the morning, needed the resurrective powers of Osiris. Their union took place during the four hours of deepest darkness – the same hours Neferkare is said to spend with his general.
