= Prophecy of Neferti =

Ancient Egyptian literary text

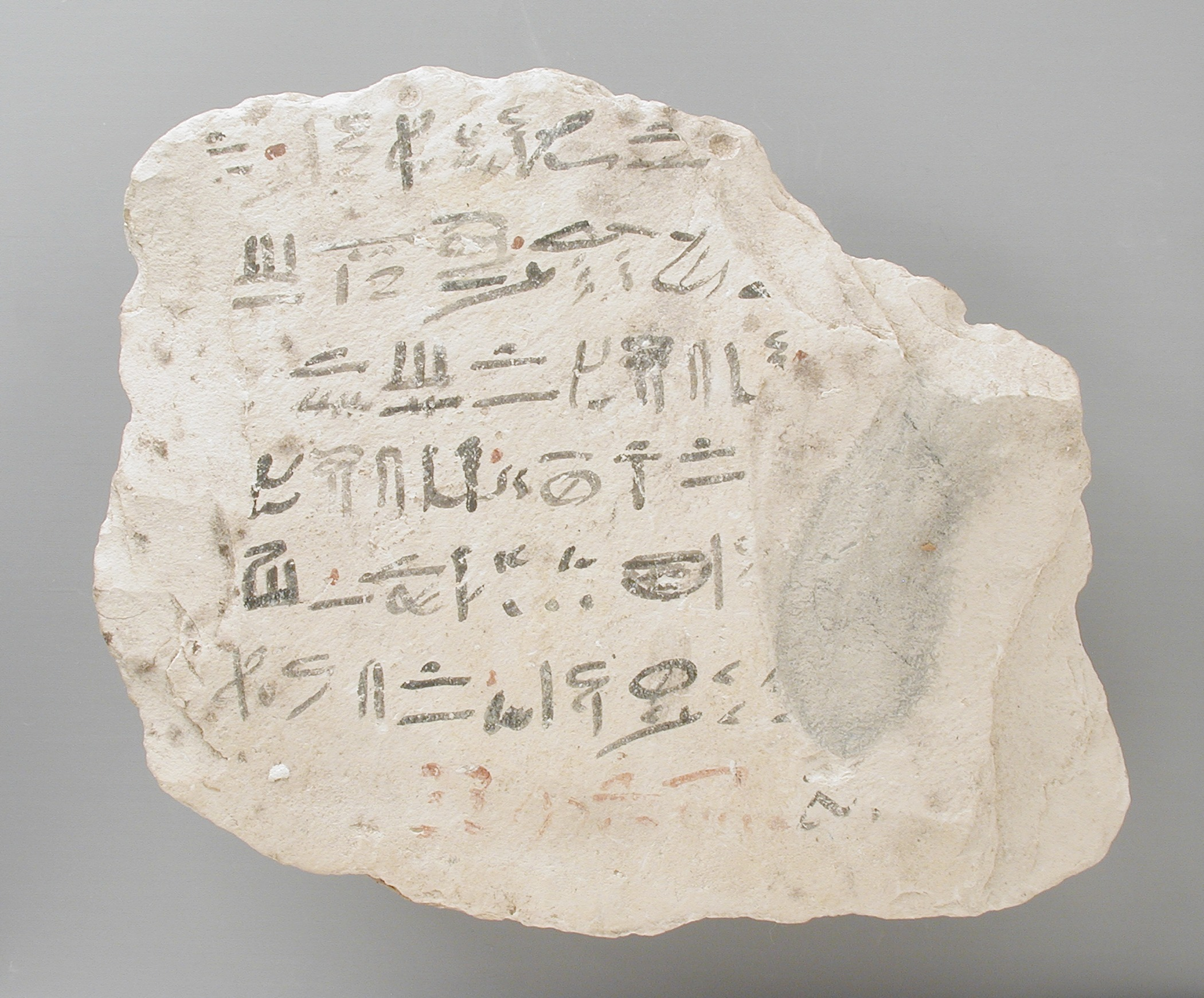
Ostrakon with fragment of the Prophecy of Neferti at LACMA (M.80.203.196)

The Prophecy of Neferti is one of the few surviving literary texts from ancient Egypt. The story is set in the Old Kingdom, under the reign of King Sneferu. However, the text should be attributed to an individual named Neferyt, who most likely composed it at the beginning of the Twelfth Dynasty. The nature of the literary text is argued upon. There are a number of different theories stating that the literature is a historical romance in pseudo-prophetic form, political literature, religious motivation as well as a literary text created to change and improve the situation in Egypt during the Twelfth Dynasty.

== Content ==
The Prophecies of Neferti is set in a fictionalized court of King Sneferu (c. 2575–2551 BC), who ruled Egypt during the Fourth Dynasty. The sage Neferti is summoned to the court so that he can entertain the King with fine speeches. He is asked to speak of the future rather than the past, the sage prophesies the downfall of the Egyptian nation by civil war, leading to the eventual atonement of the nation through the rise of a great king. According to Neferti this king, “Ameny”, will redeem the chaos, banish enemies, and set all right.

== Excerpt from "The Prophecies of Neferti" ==
“The transliteration follows Helck 1970b, using the copy on Papyrus Hermitage 1116B as principal source. The section divisions are those of Helck 1970b: after each section number are given the corresponding line-numbers in Papyrus Hermitage 1116B.”

13 (Papyrus Hermitage 1116B, lines 57 to 61)

“nswt pw r iyt n rsy imny mAa xrw rn.f sA Hmt pw n tA sty ms pw n Xn nxn iw.f r Ssp HDt iw.f r wTs dSrt iw.f smA sxmty iw.f r sHtp nbwy m mrt.sn pXr iHy m xfa wsr m nwd

There is a king who will come from the south, Ameny true of voice is his name. He is the son of a woman of the Land of the Bow, he is a child of the Heartland of Nekhen. He will take up the White Crown, he will raise up the Red Crown, he will unite the Two Mighty Goddesses, he will appease the Two Lord Gods, with what they desire. The field circuit is in his grasp, the oar in the jump.”

== Background of the Twelfth Dynasty ==
Amenemhat I, who is theorized to be “Ameny” in “The Prophecies of Neferti”, was the first ruler of the Twelfth Dynasty. He “inherited territorial unification, but faced a formidable political task. Kingship had become discredited and locally independent power had become strong. Internal reorganization around a strong central government was the task” (Wilson 275). The history of the Twelfth Dynasty leads scholars to believe that “The Prophecy of Neferti” was written as political propaganda, in order to show Amenemhat I’s claim to kingship.

== Copies ==
What survives of the secular literature of ancient Egypt is a small number of texts. It is impossible to establish conclusively whether they are indicative of the scope of the literary production or whether they are the incidental survivors of the adversaries of the time and men. Among the surviving literary texts from ancient Egypt is, “The Prophecy of Neferti”. It has only one complete version, which is portrayed on two writing tablets (Cairo 25224 and BM 5647) from the Eighteenth Dynasty. This complete version is held at the Hermitage Museum in Saint-Petersburg. Although there is only one complete version, there are numerous Ramesside partial copies of the work, over twenty, which is much higher than other well-known Egyptian literature works. The work is theorized to originally date to the Twelfth Dynasty under the reign of King Amenemhat I. Hans Goedicke argues that this literary work was undoubtedly written for contemporaries, who were fully familiar with the current events and in no way for readers of the distant future.

== Various arguments ==
There is not one interpretation of the prophecy that is widely agreed upon. Rather, there are numerous supported theories based on the interpretations of respected scholars, ranging from simplistic explanations to in-depth critical analyses. The most widely accepted interpretation revolves around the theory that it was produced as propagandistic literature for the newly established Twelfth Dynasty under the rule of King Amenemhat I. This was an early interpretation and numerous others are now considered. Hans Goedicke in his book, “The Protocol of Neferyt”, argues that “the text does not contain a prophecy of future events but is an elaboration of existing conditions in the Eastern border region and potential dangers resulting therefrom”. This, much like all Egyptian history, is a debated idea. Though, being that it places “The Prophecy of Neferty” in a new light; it takes away the possible glorification of Amenemhat I and instead places the purpose of the literary text, as one used to change and improve the situation in Egypt.

Ludwig Morenz added to the debate in 2003 with his book, “Literature as a construction of the past in the Middle Kingdom”. He believes that the only reason historical royal names appear in the text, “is to give the text a flavor of historicity and as being proto-mythical” (107). Morenz goes on to say, the author of the literature text lived several centuries after King Snofru, most likely during the Twelfth Dynasty and concrete historical memory was being re-cast as proto-myth. He also argues that the “prophetic genre of text probably derives from this notion of the possibility of knowing history” (111). A significant point that Morenz makes is that, the literary text could have been composed for the coronation of the King but gradually lost its concrete links with it. There is one key point that both Goedicke and Morenz seem to agree on, that the literature text unarguably laments the decline of Egypt as a country with the beginning of the Twelfth Dynasty.

The third argument presented is by Jose Perez-Accino. “Description of the land in chaos and turmoil shows clear primeval overtones. Several phrases can be understood as referring to a time before the creation of the world. The vision of Neferty thus seems to present a metaphor in which the time of trouble is related to a time in which creation has reverted into an original chaos and so the process of creation needs to start again” (1498). Perez-Accino compares the rise of Ameny with the creation of the world. His views differ greatly from most scholars; he believes the literary text discusses the mythological founder, Menes, as the king and not Amenemhat I directly, although the description given in the text is valid for both of them. This argument is supported by puns, as well as the idea that the literature is written in primeval and mythological context. If this is true, then from this literary text, Amenemhat I is a new Menes, “who will perform the Gods’ wishes and put an end to a condition which has afflicted the land” (Perez-Accino 1499). With this idea, the Twelfth Dynasty would be comparable to the original creation of the country.

"The Prophecies of Neferti" has been interpreted as primary evidence to support the view that Amenemhat I had Nubian heritage as his mother is described as a "woman of Ta Seti", with origins in Aswan, the extreme southern region of Egypt.

== See also ==
- Ancient Egyptian literature
- Sneferu
- Amenemhat I

== Sources ==
- Goedicke, Hans. The Protocol of Neferyt: The Prophecy of Neferti. Baltimore: Johns Hopkins UP, 1977. Print, pg. 14.
- Morenz, Ludwig D. 2003. 'Literature as a construction of the past in the Middle Kingdom'. Translated by Martin Worthington. In Tait, John (ed.), Never had the like occurred; Egypt’s view of the Past, 101-117. London: UCL Press, pg. 111.
- Lichtheim, Miriam. Ancient Egyptian Literature; a Book of Readings. Vol. 1. Berkeley: U of California, 1973. N. pag. Print. The Old and Middle Kingdoms, pg. 139.
- Parkinson, R. B. 'The Words of Neferti,' in The Tale of Sinuhe and Other Ancient Egyptian Poems, 1940-1640 BC. Oxford: Oxford UP, 1998. N. pag. Print, pg 132.
- Perez-Accino, J.R. 2015. 'Who is the sage talking about? Neferty and the Egyptian sense of history'. In Kousoulis, P. and N. Lazaridis (eds.) Proceedings of the Tenth International Congress of Egyptologists: University of the Ageean, 2. 1495-1502. Leuven: Peeters, pg. 1495.
- Quirke, Stephen 2004. Egyptian literature 1800 BC: questions and readings. Egyptology 2. London: Golden House.
- Wilson, John A. “Review: Littérature et politique dans l'Égypte de la XIIe Dynastie. G. Posener.” Journal of Near Eastern Studies, vol. 16, no. 4, 1957, pp. 275–277.
