= African philosophy =

Philosophical movement

African philosophy refers to diverse intellectual traditions, systems of thought, and philosophical inquiries originating from the African continent and its various peoples. The term and concept originated in the 20th century in response to European colonialism and developed through the post-colonial era, though much work within the field is concerned with cultural traditions dating back to long before the colonial period. There is ongoing debate about what exactly constitutes 'African philosophy' and whether the concept has a substantive or coherent meaning, given the diversity of cultures, approaches and subject matter under discussion, and absence of a unified African philosophical tradition.

In its simplest form 'African philosophy' can refer to any kind of philosophical endeavour pursued by people from the African continent, though this includes work produced within, for example, Islamic and Western traditions that is not specifically African. A more narrow definition identifies African philosophy principally with the indigenous traditions and thought systems of sub-Saharan Africa, and with modern approaches that are in some sense specifically African, rooted in indigenous African cultures and perspectives, or particularly relevant to "the African historical, cultural, social, or political experience".

Today African philosophers are found in the various academic fields of contemporary philosophy, such as metaphysics, epistemology, moral philosophy, and political philosophy.

African philosophy before the 20th century was primarily conducted and transmitted orally as ideas by thinkers whose names have been lost to history. While early African intellectual history primarily focused on folklore, wise sayings, and religious ideas, it also included philosophical concepts, such as the Nguni Bantu concept of Ubuntu. Ubuntu, often summarized by the phrase "I am because we are," emphasizes the interconnectedness of individuals within a community. It prioritizes communal values and the well-being of the group over the individual, and is reminiscent of the wider phenomenon of African communalism found across the continent.

African philosophy includes but often differs from Africana philosophy in that African philosophy usually focuses on indigenous knowledge systems and philosophical traditions native to the African continent. In contrast, Africana philosophy addresses the philosophical concerns, experiences, and identities of Africans in the diaspora, particularly in regions outside Africa such as the Americas and the Caribbean.

One particular subject that several modern African philosophers have written about is on the subject of freedom and what it means to be free or to experience wholeness.

Philosophy in Africa has a rich and varied history, some of which has been lost over time. Some of the world's oldest texts which touch on philosophical issues were produced in Ancient Egypt, written in Hieratic on papyrus, c. 2200–1000 BCE. One of the earliest known Egyptian philosophers was Ptahhotep, author of The Maxims of Ptahotep.

A philosophical tradition of Islamic scholarship emerged in medieval African kingdoms such as Ghana, Mali and Songhai. In the seventeenth century, a philosophical literature developed in Ethiopia in relation to theodicy, principle of ethics and psychology under the philosopher Zera Yacob, and that of his disciple Walda Heywat."

In the 21st century, research by Egyptologists has suggested that the word philosopher itself may stem from Egypt. According to the historian Dag Herbjørnsrud: "scholarship of the 21st century has opened up a new possibility: the founding Greek word philosophos, lover of wisdom, is itself a borrowing from and translation of the Egyptian concept mer-rekh (mr-rḫ) which literally means “lover of wisdom,” or knowledge."

In the early and mid-twentieth century, anti-colonial movements had a tremendous effect on the development of a distinct modern African political philosophy that had resonance on both the continent and in the African diaspora. One well-known example of the economic philosophical works emerging from this period was the African socialist philosophy of Ujamaa propounded in Tanzania and other parts of Southeast Africa. These African political and economic philosophical developments also had a notable impact on the anti-colonial movements of many non-African peoples around the world.

== Definition ==
There is some debate in defining the ethnophilosophical parameters of African philosophy and identifying what differentiates it from other philosophical traditions. One of the implicit assumptions of ethnophilosophy is that a specific culture can have a philosophy that is not applicable and accessible to all peoples and cultures in the world. In A Discourse on African Philosophy: A New Perspective on Ubuntu and Transitional Justice in South Africa, Christian B. N. Gade argues that the ethnophilosophical approach to African philosophy as a static group property is highly problematic. His research on ubuntu presents an alternative collective discourse on African philosophy that takes differences, historical developments, and social contexts seriously. According to Edwin Etieyibo and Jonathon O. Chimakonam in their article “African Philosophy: Past, Present, and Future”, historical context plays an important role in African philosophy. History provides the framework in which we can inspect philosophical problems. In terms of African philosophy, one must look at the whole picture through the lens of African history. “There are no facts without history."

African philosophy can be formally defined as a critical thinking by Africans on their experiences of reality. Nigerian born Philosopher K.C. Anyanwu defined African philosophy as "that which concerns itself with the way in which African people of the past and present make sense of their destiny and of the world in which they live.

Nigerian philosopher Joseph I. Omoregbe broadly defines a philosopher as one who attempts to understand the world's phenomena, the purpose of human existence, the nature of the world, and the place of human beings in that world. This form of natural philosophy is identifiable in Africa even before individual African philosophers can be distinguished in the sources. Like Western philosophy, African philosophy contemplates the perceptions of time, personhood, space and other subjects.

== History ==
There is a rich history of philosophy in Africa - for example from ancient Egypt, Ethiopia, and Mali (Timbuktutu, Djenne). in the modern era, a new beginning is linked to the 1920s, when African individuals who had studied in the United States and Europe ("the West") returned to Africa and reflected on the racial discrimination experienced abroad. Their arrival back in Africa instigated a feeling of onuma, which is an interpretation of "frustration." The onuma was felt in response to legacies of colonialism on a global scale. The development of African philosophy in the 20th century is important because onuma inspired some who had traveled and returned to formulate a "systematic beginning" of philosophizing African identity, the space of African people in history, and African contribution to humanity.

== Criteria ==
According to some, two conflicting components are deemed integral to a work for it to be considered African philosophy. First, the piece must have a racial focus. This facet is valued by Traditionalist groups, who posit that African philosophy should be an expression of the world experienced by African individuals. African philosophy must be produced by African authors. In contrast, Universalist groups suggest that African philosophy should be analyses and critical engagement of and between individual African thinkers. A work is African philosophy based on a focal point of tradition. African philosophy must pull from African cultural backgrounds or thought processes, but it should be independent from racial considerations and use "African" only as a term of solidarity.

== Methods ==
=== Communitarian method ===
The communitarian method of African philosophy emphasizes mutualism in thought. It is most commonly used by researchers following ubuntu. The common expression of ubuntu is that "a person is a person through a person." Leonhard Praeg, Mogobe Ramose, and Fainos Mangera implement the communitarian method.

=== Complementary method ===
The complementary method focuses on the prospect of a missing link. All variables are important in consideration of histories and identities, and no variable should be overlooked or under-considered. Additionally, all variables affect one another, so the relationship between them and their affects on other variables should be scrutinized. Mesembe Edet implements the complementary method.

=== Conversational method ===
The conversational method creates thought by assessing a relationship between oppositional works. The defender or proponent is named "nwa-swa," and the nwa swa is questioned and doubted by a disagreeing party, known as "nwa nju." The conversational method emphasizes the interconnectedness of networks within reality; the more accurate a thought should be, the more specific a location should be. This method is endorsed by the Conventional School of Psychology, and it is used by Victor Nweke and Msembe Edet.

== Early philosophy by region ==
=== Pre-modern ===
==== North East Africa ====
In North East Africa, arguably central to the development of the ancient Egyptian philosophical tradition of Egypt and Sudan was the conception of ma'at, which roughly translated refers to 'justice', 'truth', or simply 'that which is right'. One of the earliest works of political philosophy was The Maxims of Ptahhotep, which were taught to Egyptian schoolboys for centuries.

Ancient Egypt have several philosophical texts that have been treated by scholars in recent years. In the 2018 podcast "Africana Philosophy", the philosophers Peter Adamson and Chike Jeffers devoted the first eight episodes to Egyptian philosophy. The American Philosophical Association (APA) has published a text on the classical text The Immortality of Writers ("Be a Writer"), ca. 1200 BCE. The Blog of the APA article also covers The Dispute Between a Man and His Ba from the 19th century BCE; The Teaching of Ani, 13th century BCE, which gives advice to the ordinary man; The Satire of the Trades by Khety; and the text of Amennakht (active in 1170–1140 BCE) from Deir el-Medina, whose teaching states that "it is good to finish school, better than the smell of lotus blossoms in summer".

Philosophers from Africa also made important contributions to Hellenistic philosophy and Christian philosophy. In the Hellenistic tradition, the influential philosophical school of Neoplatonism was founded in the 3rd century CE by the Greek philosopher Plotinus, who was born and raised in Roman Egypt. The Church Father and philosopher Augustine of Hippo (born in Thagaste, today's Algeria, in 354) had a Christian mother, Saint Monica, who was an Amazigh (Berber), and Augustine defined himself as an African (or Punic, of Phoenician descent).

==== West Africa ====
The most prominent of West Africa's pre-modern philosophical traditions has been identified as that of the Yoruba philosophical tradition and the distinctive worldview that emerged from it over the thousands of years of its development. Philosophical concepts such as Ifá, Omoluabi, Ashè and Emi Omo Eso were integral to this system, and the totality of its elements are contained in what is known amongst the Yoruba as the Itan. The cosmologies and philosophies of the Akan, Dogon, Serer and Dahomey were also significant.

==== Southern Africa ====
In Southern Africa and Southeast Africa the development of a distinctive Bantu philosophy addressing the nature of existence, the cosmos and humankind's relation to the world following the Bantu migration has had the most significant impact on the philosophical developments of the said regions, with the development of the philosophy of Ubuntu as one notable example emerging from this worldview

==== Central & East Africa ====
Many Central African philosophical traditions before the Bantu migration into southern Central Africa have been identified as a uniting characteristic of many Nilotic and Sudanic peoples, ultimately giving rise to the distinctive worldviews identified in the conceptions of time, the creation of the world, human nature, and the proper relationship between mankind and nature prevalent in Dinka mythology, Maasai mythology and similar traditions.

=== Early modern ===
==== West Africa ====
In pre-colonial Senegambia (modern Gambia and Senegal), the 17th-century philosopher Kocc Barma Fall (b. 1586) stood out as one of the renowned philosophers in Senegambian history. His proverbs are still recited by Senegalese and Gambians alike, including in Senegambian popular culture - for example in Ousmane Sembene's films such as Guelwaar

One of the foremost scholars of Timbuktu was Ahmed Baba (1556–1627), who argued against what he called "racial slavery". One of the leading women philosophers and writers of the Sokoto Caliphate, in present-day Nigeria, was the princess Nana Asma'u (1793-1864).

==== Horn of Africa ====
A copy of 17th century philosophical and ethical treatise by Ethiopian philosopher Zera Yacob

In the Horn of Africa, there are a number of sources documenting the development of a distinct Ethiopian philosophy. Among the most notable examples from this tradition emerge from the work of the 17th-century philosopher Zera Yacob, and that of his disciple Walda Heywat. Yacob in his writings discusses religion, morality, and existence. He comes to the belief that every person will believe their faith to be the right one and that all men are created equal.

==== African diaspora ====
Some early modern African diasporic philosophy was produced by descendants of Africans in Europe and the Americas. One notable pre-modern diasporic African philosopher was Anthony William Amo in the 18th century, who was taken as a slave from Awukenu in what is now Ghana, and was brought up and educated in Europe where he gained doctorates in medicine and philosophy, and subsequently became a professor of philosophy at the universities of Halle and Jena in Germany.

== Modern trends ==
Kenyan philosopher Henry Odera Oruka has distinguished what he calls four trends in modern African philosophy: ethnophilosophy, philosophical sagacity, nationalistic–ideological philosophy, and professional philosophy. In fact it would be more realistic to call them candidates for the position of African philosophy, with the understanding that more than one of them might fit the bill. (Oruka later added two additional categories: literary/artistic philosophy, such as the work of literary figures such as Ngũgĩ wa Thiong'o, Wole Soyinka, Chinua Achebe, Okot p'Bitek, and Taban Lo Liyong, and hermeneutic philosophy, the analysis of African languages in order to find philosophical content.) In the African diaspora, American philosopher Maulana Karenga has also been notable in presenting varied definitions for understanding modern African philosophy, especially as it relates to its earliest sources.

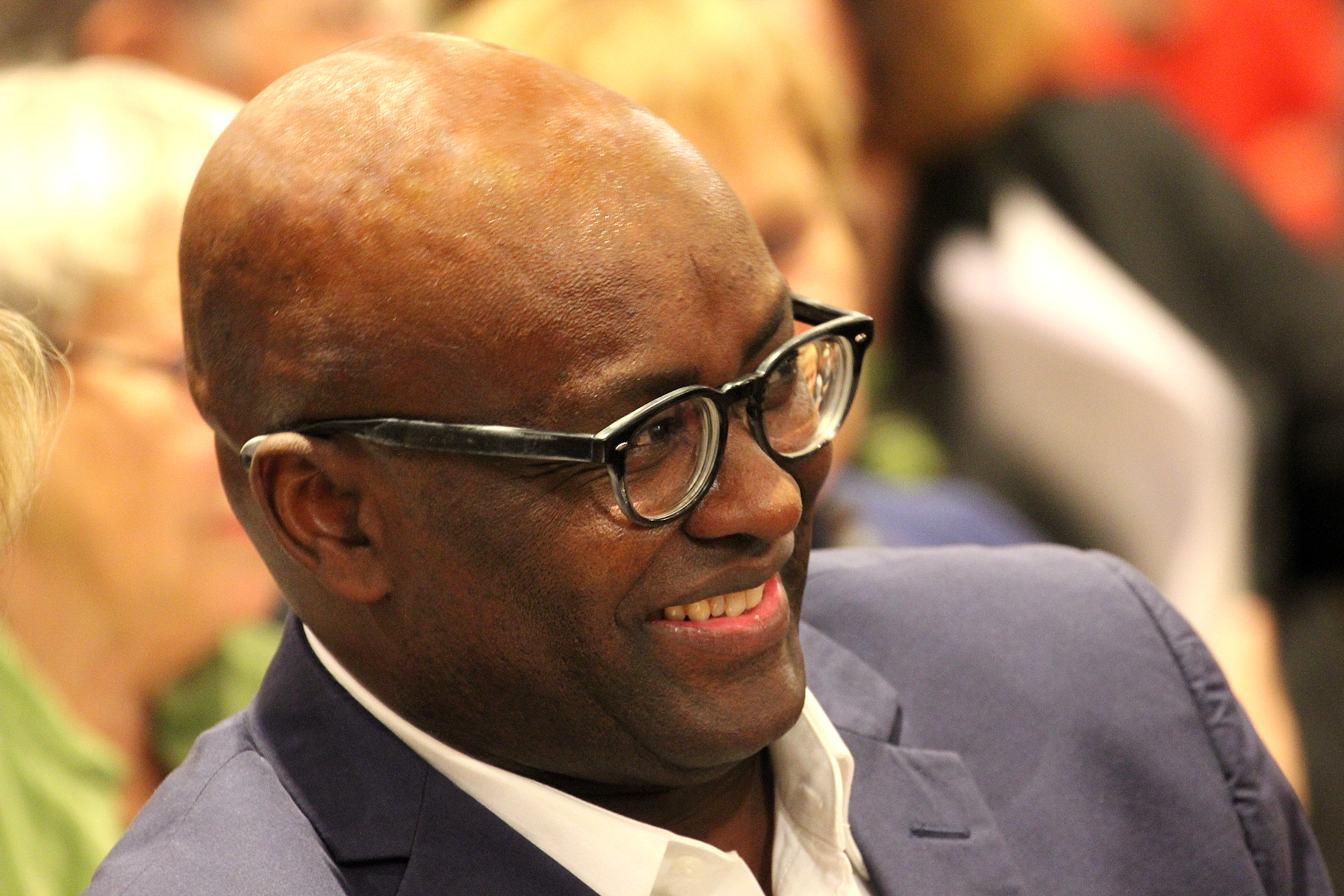
Achille Mbembe, a modern African philosopher

One notable contributor to professional philosophy is Achille Mbembe. He interacts with a multitude of modern subjects, including thoughts on statehood, death, capital, racism, and colonialism. He invokes attention to moral and political arguments through a tone of morality in his works. Many recent pieces from Mbembe, including Critique of Black Reason, suggest that understanding Europe as a force not at the center of the universe is a point from which philosophy and society should view the world. Mbembe asserts that he positions himself in multiple worlds of existence at one time. This method creates an empathetic point from which the world can be viewed.

=== Ethnophilosophy and philosophical sagacity ===
Henry Odera Oruka of Kenya came up with Sage Philosophy and philosophic sagacity is attributed to him. Ethnophilosophy has been used to record the beliefs found in African cultures. Such an approach treats African philosophy as consisting in a set of shared beliefs, values, categories, and assumptions that are implicit in the language, practices, and beliefs of African cultures; in short, the uniquely African worldview. As such, it is seen as an item of communal property rather than an activity for the individual.

One proponent of this form, Placide Tempels, argued in Bantu Philosophy that the metaphysical categories of the Bantu people are reflected in their linguistic categories. According to this view, African philosophy can be best understood as springing from the fundamental assumptions about reality reflected in the languages of Africa.

Another example of this sort of approach is the work of Ebiegberi Joe Alagoa of the University of Port Harcourt in Nigeria, who argues for the existence of an African philosophy of history stemming from traditional proverbs from the Niger Delta in his paper "An African Philosophy of History in the Oral Tradition." Alagoa argues that in African philosophy, age is seen as an important factor in gaining wisdom and interpreting the past. In support of this view, he cites proverbs such as "More days, more wisdom", and "What an old man sees seated, a youth does not see standing." Truth is seen as eternal and unchanging ("Truth never rots"), but people are subject to error ("Even a four-legged horse stumbles and falls"). It is dangerous to judge by appearances ("A large eye does not mean keen vision"), but first-hand observation can be trusted ("He who sees does not err"). The past is not seen as fundamentally different from the present, but all history is contemporary history ("A storyteller does not tell of a different season"). The future remains beyond knowledge ("Even a bird with a long neck cannot see the future"). Nevertheless, it is said, "God will outlive eternity." History is seen as vitally important ("One ignorant of his origin is nonhuman"), and historians (known as "sons of the soil") are highly revered ("The son of the soil has the python's keen eyes"). However, these arguments must be taken with a grain of cultural relativism, as the span of culture in Africa is incredibly vast, with patriarchies, matriarchies, monotheists and traditional religionists among the population, and as such the attitudes of groups of the Niger Delta cannot be applied to the whole of Africa.

Another more controversial application of this approach is embodied in the concept of Negritude. Leopold Senghor, a proponent of Negritude, argued that the distinctly African approach to reality is based on emotion rather than logic, works itself out in participation rather than analysis, and manifests itself through the arts rather than the sciences. Cheikh Anta Diop and Mubabinge Bilolo, on the other hand, while agreeing that African culture is unique, challenged the view of Africans as essentially emotional and artistic, arguing that Egypt was an African culture whose achievements in science, mathematics, architecture, and philosophy were pre-eminent. This philosophy may also be maligned as overly reductionist due to the obvious scientific and scholarly triumphs of not only ancient Egypt, but also Nubia, Meroe, as well as the great library of Timbuktu, the extensive trade networks and kingdoms of North Africa, West Africa, Central Africa, the Horn of Africa and Great Zimbabwe and the other major empires of Southern, Southeast and Central Africa.

Critics of this approach argue that the actual philosophical work in producing a coherent philosophical position is being done by the academic philosopher (such as Alagoa), and that the sayings of the same culture can be selected from and organised in many different ways in order to produce very different, often contradictory systems of thought.

Philosophical sagacity is a sort of individualist version of ethnophilosophy, in which one records the beliefs of certain special members of a community. The premise here is that, although most societies demand some degree of conformity of belief and behaviour from their members, a certain few of those members reach a particularly high level of knowledge and understanding of their cultures' worldviews; such people are sages. In some cases, the sage goes beyond mere knowledge and understanding to reflection and questioning—these become the targets of philosophical sagacity.

Critics of this approach note that not all reflection and questioning is philosophical; besides, if African philosophy were to be defined purely in terms of philosophic sagacity, then the thoughts of the sages could not be African philosophy, for they did not record them from other sages. Also, on this view the only difference between non-African anthropology or ethnology and African philosophy seems to be the nationality of the researcher.

Critics argue further that the problem with both ethnophilosophy and philosophical sagacity is that there is surely an important distinction between philosophy and the history of ideas, although other philosophers consider the two topics to be remarkably similar. The argument is that no matter how interesting the beliefs of a people such as the Akan or the Yoruba may be to the philosopher, they remain beliefs, not philosophy. To call them philosophy is to use a secondary sense of that term, as in "my philosophy is live and let live."

=== Professional philosophy ===
Professional philosophy is usually identified as that produced by African philosophers trained in the Western philosophical tradition, that embraces a universal view of the methods and concerns of philosophy. Those philosophers identified in this category often explicitly reject the assumptions of ethnophilosophy and adopt a universalist worldview of philosophy that requires all philosophy to be accessible and applicable to all peoples and cultures in the world. This is even if the specific philosophical questions prioritized by individual national or regional philosophies may differ. Some African philosophers classified in this category are Odera Oruka, Paulin Hountondji, Peter Bodunrin, Kwasi Wiredu, Tsenay Serequeberhan, Marcien Towa and Lansana Keita.

=== Nationalist and ideological philosophy ===
Nationalist and ideological philosophy might be considered a special case of philosophic sagacity, in which not sages but ideologues are the subjects. Alternatively, it has been considered as a subcategory of professional political philosophy. In either case, the same sort of problem arises with retaining a distinction between ideology and philosophy, and also between sets of ideas and a special way of reasoning. Examples include African socialism, Nkrumaism, Harambee and Authenticité.

=== African ethics ===
Although Africa is extremely diverse, there appear to be some shared moral ideas across many ethnic groups. In a number of African cultures, ethics is centered on a person's character, and saying "he has no morals" translates as something like "he has no character". A person's character reflects the accumulation of their deeds and their habits of conduct; hence, it can be changed over a person's life. In some African cultures, "personhood" refers to an adult human who exhibits moral virtues, and one who behaves badly is not considered a person, even if he is considered a human.

While many traditional African societies are highly religious, their religions are not revealed religions, and hence, ethics does not center around divine commands. Instead, ethics is humanistic and utilitarian: it focuses on improving social functioning and human flourishing. On the other hand, social welfare is not a mere aggregate of individual welfare; rather, there is a collective "social good" embodying values that everyone wants, like peace and stability. In general, African ethics is social or collectivistic rather than individualistic and united in ideology. Cooperation and altruism are considered crucial. African ethics places more weight on duties of prosocial behaviour than on rights per se, in contrast to most of Western ethics.

=== Africana philosophy ===
Africana philosophy is the work of philosophers of African descent and others whose work deals with the subject matter of the African diaspora. This is a relatively new (since the 1980s) and developing name given to African thought, and it is given credible attention by professional organizations, including the American Philosophical Association.

Africana philosophy includes the philosophical ideas, arguments and theories of particular concern to people of African descent. Some of the topics explored by Africana philosophy include: pre-Socratic African philosophy and modern day debates discussing the early history of Western philosophy, post-colonial writing in Africa and the Americas, black resistance to oppression, black existentialism in the United States, and the meaning of "blackness" in the modern world.

== African epistemology ==
African epistemology is epistemology from the African perspective, and is therefore rooted in African ontology which is unitary and communal. (Note: It does not divide knowledge's domain into rational, empirical, mythological etc.) If epistemology concerns knowledge and non-knowledge, African epistemology considers awareness of what is and can be known, and what isn't and can't be known, contending that human knowledge is, and always will be, humility-inducingly limited and dwarfed by what isn't known. In the search for a comprehensive knowledge, approximation is considered desirable.

Ancestral spirits, i.e. spirits of individuals that once inhabited the physical world, are central to traditional African thought. It is believed they are still capable of actions which have consequences in the physical world, and having knowledge of their intentions provides grounds for understanding physical occurrences. Reality is conceived in a holistic view in which personalism is expressed in concrete consubstantiation of spirit. While Western epistemology follows analytical reason, African epistemology follows emotional and intuitive reason where experience is foundational to knowledge, and experience is acted upon by and combined with reason to produce a "complete knowledge". Fundamentally, there is thought to be more to the realm of experience than what can be unearthed via empirical enquiry. This contrasts the fundamental tenet of Western culture where science is the main determiner of what is and is not real, and anything unconfirmed by science is viewed as metaphysical fantasy or superstition. This informs what is termed the "colonial myth on Africa", and African scholars have defended "African rational, logical and analytic consciousness and thought patterns", pointing to the cultural embeddings of knowledge.

African philosophy seeks a middle ground between dualism and monism regarding the material and spiritual, noting their correlativity. Epistemological dualism, where the epistemic subject and epistemic object are separated, is absent from African epistemology, and the epistemic subject "experiences the epistemic object in a sensuous, emotive, intuitive, abstractive understanding, rather than through abstraction alone, as is the case in Western epistemology". Thus, oral traditions, music, folklore, myths, proverbs and the like are utilized in the preservation and transmission of knowledge. African epistemology is the endeavour of the individual, not the community and therefore not ethnophilosophy, and holders of knowledge are considered moral agents that treat knowledge as a tool to moralise/humanise themselves and the society as a whole, thus knowledge is definitively used to address human societal challenges.

Criticisms come from African neo-positivists, who argue that African epistemology must have a basic method of testing knowledge claims to be truly valid. A response is that Africans don't prioritise separation of knowledge and belief, but prioritise whether it is true or false, often seeking a third party's opinion or further evidence from a reliable/truthful person. Truth is considered relativist, and relies on what is meant or understood, which is not always translatable between individuals or cultures owing to differing paradigms and linguistical conventions. Thus knowledge is viewed as a societal convention rather than an objectivist phenomenon. Universal justifiers of epistemological claims are: linguistic-conceptual schemes, human nature, socio-cultural values and interests, and customs and habits, which commonly instil confidence.

== List of philosophers ==
This is a list of notable philosophers from the continent of Africa.

=== Ancient ===
Ancient Egyptian

- Ptah-Hotep (c. early 2nd millennium BC)
- Kagemni I (c. early 2nd millennium BC)

Greco-Roman

- Lacydes of Cyrene, 3rd century BC
- Clitimachus, c. 187–110 BC
- Dionysius of Cyrene, c. 150 BC
- Heraclides Lembus, 2nd century BC
- Dio of Alexandria, 1st century BC
- Sextus Julius Africanus, c. 160–240 CE
- Plotinus, c. 205–270 CE
- George of Laodicea, d. 359 CE
- Hypatia, c. 350–415 CE
- Augustine of Hippo, 354–430 CE

=== Medieval ===
Egypt

- Al-Shafi'i, 767–820
- Maimonides, c. 1135–1204 (born in Muslim Spain)
- al-Suyuti, c. 1445–1505

North Africa

- Abu al-Abbas as-Sabti, 1129–1204
- Al-Shadhili, 1196–1258
- Ahmad al-Badawi, 1200–1276
- Judah ben Nissim,13th or 14th century
- Ibn Khaldun, 1332–1406

West Africa

- Al-Hajj Salim Suwari, 13th or 15th century

=== Early Modern ===
Ethiopia

- Zera Yacob, 1600–1693
- Walda Heywat, 1633–1710

West Africa

- Ahmad Baba al-Timbukti, 1556–1627
- Kocc Barma Fall, 1586–1655
- Anton Wilhelm Amo, c. 1703–1759
- Usman dan Fodio, 1754–1817

North Africa

- Ahmad ibn Idris al-Fasi, 1760–1837

=== Late Modern & Contemporary ===
Algeria

- Lalla Zaynab, c. 1862–1904
- Isabelle Eberhardt, 1877–1904
- Malek Bennabi, 1905–1973
- Frantz Fanon, 1925–1961
- Mohammed Arkoun, 1928–2010
- Mohammed Chaouki Zine, 1972–

Benin

- Paulin J. Hountondji, 1942–2024

Cameroon

- Achille Mbembe, 1957–

Congo

- Theophile Obenga, 1936–
- V. Y. Mudimbe, 1941–2025
- Ernest Wamba dia Wamba, 1942–2020
- Jacques Depelchin, 1942–

Egypt

- Rifa'a al-Tahtawi, 1801–1873
- Mustafa Abd al-Rizq, 1885–1947
- Zaki Naguib Mahmoud, 1905–1993
- Abdel Rahman Badawi, 1917–2002
- Ihab Hassan, 1925–2015
- Fouad Zakariyya, 1927–2010
- Hassan Hanafi, 1935–2021
- Abdel Wahab El-Messiri, 1938-2008

Gambia

- Alieu Ebrima Cham Joof, 1924–2011

Ghana

- Kwame Nkrumah, 1909–1972
- Kwasi Wiredu, 1931–2022
- Kwame Gyekye, 1939–2019
- Ato Sekyi-Otu, 1941–
- Kwame Anthony Appiah, 1954–

Kenya

- Dada Masiti, c. 1810s–1919
- John Mbiti, 1931–2019
- Ngũgĩ wa Thiong'o, 1938–2025
- Micere Githae Mugo, 1942–2023
- Henry Odera Oruka, 1944–1995
- P.L.O. Lumumba, 1962–

Libya

- Aref Ali Nayed, 1962–

Malawi

- Didier Kaphagawani, d. 2000

Mali

- Amadou Hampâté Bâ, 1900–1991

Morocco

- Mohammed Aziz Lahbabi, 1923–1993
- Mohammed Abed al-Jabri, 1936–2010
- Hourya Sinaceur, 1940–
- Mohammed Allal Sinaceur, 1941–
- Mohammed Sabila, 1942–2021
- Taha Abdurrahman, 1944–
- Bensalem Himmich, 1948–
- Abdellatif Zeroual, 1951—1974

Nigeria

- Nana Asma'u, 1793–1864
- Obafemi Awolowo, 1909–1987
- Chinua Achebe, 1930–2013
- Wole Soyinka, 1934–
- John Olubi Sodipo, 1935–1999
- Sophie Oluwole, 1935–2018
- Theophilus Okere, 1935–2020
- Emmanuel Chukwudi Eze, 1963–2007
- Josephat Obi Oguejiofor, mid-20th century–
- Ike Odimegwu, active 1991–
- Elvis Imafidon, 1984–

Rwanda

- Alexis Kagame, 1912–1981

Senegal

- Leopold Sedar Senghor, 1906–2001
- Cheikh Anta Diop, 1923–1986
- Souleymane Bachir Diagne, 1955–

South Africa

- John Langalibalele Dube, 1871–1946
- Es'kia Mphahlele, 1919–2008
- Steve Biko, 1946–1977
- Mabogo P. More, 1946–
- Mogobe Ramose, 1948–
- David Benatar, 1966–
- Mpho Tshivhase, 1986–

Tanzania

- Julius Nyerere, 1922–1999

Tunisia

- Mohamed Habib Marzouki, 1947–
- Rachida Triki, 1949–

== See also ==
- African philosophers
- Ancient Egyptian philosophy
- Afrophone philosophy
