= Motsamai Molefe =

South African philosopher

Education
- Education: University of Witwatersrand BA (Philosophy and Psychology), University of Witwatersrand MA (Development Studies), University of Johannesburg, PhD

Philosophical work
- Era: 21st-century philosophy
- Region: African philosophy
- School: Ubuntu
- Institutions: As faculty member: KwaZulu-Natal; Witwatersrand; Fort Hare
- Main interests: African philosophy; Bioethics; Ubuntu; Environmental Ethics

Motsamai Molefe is a South African philosopher, one of the thinkers to have popularised African philosophy, and specifically Applied Ethics in context of Ubuntu philosophy. Molefe is Professor of Philosophy at the University of Fort Hare in Alice, Eastern Cape.

== Biography ==
Motsamai Molefe obtained his Bachelor of Arts in Philosophy and Psychology at the University of Witwatersrand. After graduating in 2006, he obtained his MA degree in Development Studies from University of Witwatersrand, and he received his PhD in Philosophy from the University of Johannesburg in South Africa.

He was Lecturer in Ethics at University of KwaZulu-Natal and Senior Lecturer at University of Witwatersrand.

Motsamai Molefe is Director and Founding Member of African Political Theory Association (APTA).

Molefe is a Senior Researcher at the Centre for Leadership Ethics in Africa (CLEA), at the University of Fort Hare, South Africa.

== Philosophical thought ==
Molefe published three main books. The first, An African Philosophy of Personhood, Morality, and Politics, focused on moral and political issues of personhood. The second, African Personhood and Applied Ethics, addressed the question of nature of personhood in African perspective. The third, An African Ethics of Personhood and Bioethics: A Reflection on Abortion and Euthanasia, focused on the issue of bioethics.

=== Personhood in African philosophy ===
Personhood, in Molefe's view, is a moral quality which human beings earn based on the quality of their behavior in society or on their being objects of dignity. This explanation is present in the book African Personhood and Applied Ethics, published in 2020.

== Influence and reception ==
Motsamai Molefe's work has been influenced by several thinkers of African Philosophy as the Nigerian Ifeanyi Menkiti, the Ghanaian Kwame Gyekye, the Ghanaian Kwasi Wiredu and the South African Mogobe Ramose. Molefe has contributed to African philosophy with the notions of personhood and dignity in African perspective.

== Publications ==
=== Books ===
- An African Philosophy of Personhood, Morality, and Politics. New York: Palgrave MacMillan, 2019.
- African Personhood and Applied Ethics. Makhanda: NISC, 2020.
- An African Ethics of Personhood and Bioethics: A Reflection on Abortion and Euthanasia. New York: Palgrave MacMillan, 2021.

=== Articles ===
- "A Rejection of Humanism in the African Moral Tradition". Theoria: A Journal of Social and Political Theory (2015), 62 (143).
- "African Ethics and Partiality". Phronimon (2016), 17 (2): 1–19.
- "An African perspective on the partiality and impartiality debate: Insights from Kwasi Wiredu's moral philosophy". South African Journal of Philosophy (2017), 36 (4): 470–82.
- "Critical comments on Afro-communitarianism: the community versus individual". Filosofia Theoretica: Journal of African Philosophy, Culture and Religions (2017), 6 (1): 1-22.
- "An African religious ethics and the Euthyphro problem". Acta Academica (2017), 49 (1): 22–38.
- "Personhood and Rights in an African Tradition". Politikon: South African Journal of Political Studies (2018), 45 (2): 217–31.
- "Personhood and (Rectification) Justice in African Thought". Politikon: South African Journal of Political Studies (2018), 45 (3): 352–67.
- "What Can Ubuntu Do? A Reflection on African Moral Theory in Light of Post-Colonial Challenges". Politikon: South African Journal of Political Studies (2019), 46 (88): 311–25.
- "Solving the Conundrum of African Philosophy Through Personhood: The Individual or Community?". The Journal of Value Inquiry (2020), 54: 41–57.
- "Personhood and a meaningful life in African philosophy". South African Journal of Philosophy (2020), 39 (2): 194–207.

== See also ==
- African philosophy
- Africana philosophy
