= Ancient Egyptian philosophy =

Ancient Egyptian philosophy refers to the philosophical works and beliefs of Ancient Egypt. There is some debate regarding its true scope and nature.

== Notable works ==
One Egyptian figure sometimes considered an early philosopher is Ptahhotep. He served as vizier to the pharaoh in the late 25th, early 24th century BC. Ptahhotep is known for his work on ethical behavior, called The Maxims of Ptahhotep. The work, which is believed to have been compiled by his grandson Ptahhotep Tjefi, is a series of 37 letters or maxims addressed to his son, Akhethotep, speaking on such topics as daily behavior and ethical practices.

Dag Herbjørnsrud, writing for the American Philosophical Association, describes the 3200-year-old manuscript "The Immortality of Writers", or "Be a Writer" (c. 1200 BC), as a "remarkable example of classical Egyptian philosophy." The manuscript, attributed to the writer Irsesh, states:

Man perishes; his corpse turns to dust; all his relatives return to the earth. But writings make him remembered in the mouth of the reader. A book is more effective than a well-built house or a tomb-chapel, better than an established villa or a stela in the temple! [...] They gave themselves a book as their lector-priest, a writing-board as their dutiful son. Teachings are their mausolea, the reed-pen their child, the burnishing-stone their wife. Both great and small are given them as their children, for the writer is chief.

Herbjørnsrud writes:

"In 2018, projects are under way to translate several ancient Egyptian texts for the first time. Yet we already have a wide variety of genres to choose from in order to study the manuscripts from a philosophical perspective: The many maxims in “The Teaching of Ptahhotep”, the earliest preserved manuscript of this vizier of the fifth dynasty is from the 19th century BC, in which he also argues that you should “follow your heart”; “The Teaching of Ani”, written by a humble middle-class scribe in the 13th century BC, which gives advice to the ordinary man; “The Satire of the Trades” by Khety, who tries to convince his son Pepy to “love books more than your mother” as there is nothing “on earth” like being a scribe; the masterpiece “The Dispute Between a Man and His Ba” of the 19th century BC – in which a man laments “the misery of life,” while his ba (personality/soul) replies that life is good, that he should rather “ponder life” as it is a burial that is miserable [...] Or we can read Amennakht (active in 1170–1140 BC), the leading intellectual of the scribal town Deir El-Medina, whose teaching states that “it is good to finish school, better than the smell of lotus blossoms in summer.”

== Theology and cosmology ==
Theology and cosmology were central concerns in Egyptian thought. Perhaps the earliest form of a monotheistic theology also emerged in Egypt, with the rise of the Amarna theology (or Atenism) of Akhenaten (14th century BCE), which held that the solar creation deity Aten was the only god. This has been described as a "monotheistic revolution" by egyptologist Jan Assmann, though it also drew on previous developments in Egyptian thought, particularly the "New Solar Theology" based around Amun-Ra. These theological developments also influenced the post-Amarna Ramesside theology, which retained a focus on a single creative solar deity (though without outright rejection of other gods, which are now seen as manifestations of the main solar deity). This period also saw the development of the concept of the ba (soul) and its relation to god. According to Goldwasser (2006) the Hyksos king Apophis (c. 1550 BC) may have been "the first to introduce into the history of ideas, the option of a "single god and no other," the first step on the long winding road of monotheism".

== Influence on Ancient Greek philosophy ==
Several of the ancient Greek philosophers regarded Egypt as a place of wisdom and philosophy. Isocrates (b. 436 BC) states in Busiris that "all men agree the Egyptians are the healthiest and most long of life among men; and then for the soul they introduced philosophy's training, a pursuit which has the power, not only to establish laws, but also to investigate the nature of the universe. " He declares that Greek writers traveled to Egypt to seek knowledge. One of them was Pythagoras of Samos who "was first to bring to the Greeks all philosophy," according to Isocrates.

Plato states in Phaedrus that the Egyptian Thoth "invented numbers and arithmetic... and, most important of all, letters.” In Plato's Timaeus, Socrates quotes the ancient Egyptian wise men when the law-giver Solon travels to Egypt to learn: "O Solon, Solon, you Greeks are always children." Aristotle attests to Egypt being the original land of wisdom. He stated in Politics that "Egyptians are reputed to be the oldest of nations, but they have always had laws and a political system."

== See also ==
- African philosophy
- Book of Thoth
- Egyptology
- Isfet (Egyptian mythology)
- Maat
- Maxims of Ptahhotep
- Middle Eastern philosophy
- Philosophy in Coptic
- Sebayt
