= John Olubi Sodipo =

Nigerian philosopher

- Born: 15 October 1935; Ilisan Remo, Ogun State
- Died: 4 December 1999 (aged 64)
- Education: University of Durham
- Spouse: Florence Oyedokun Oworu
- Children: 5
- Scientific career
- Fields: African philosophy
- Workplaces: Obafemi Awolowo University; Ogun State University

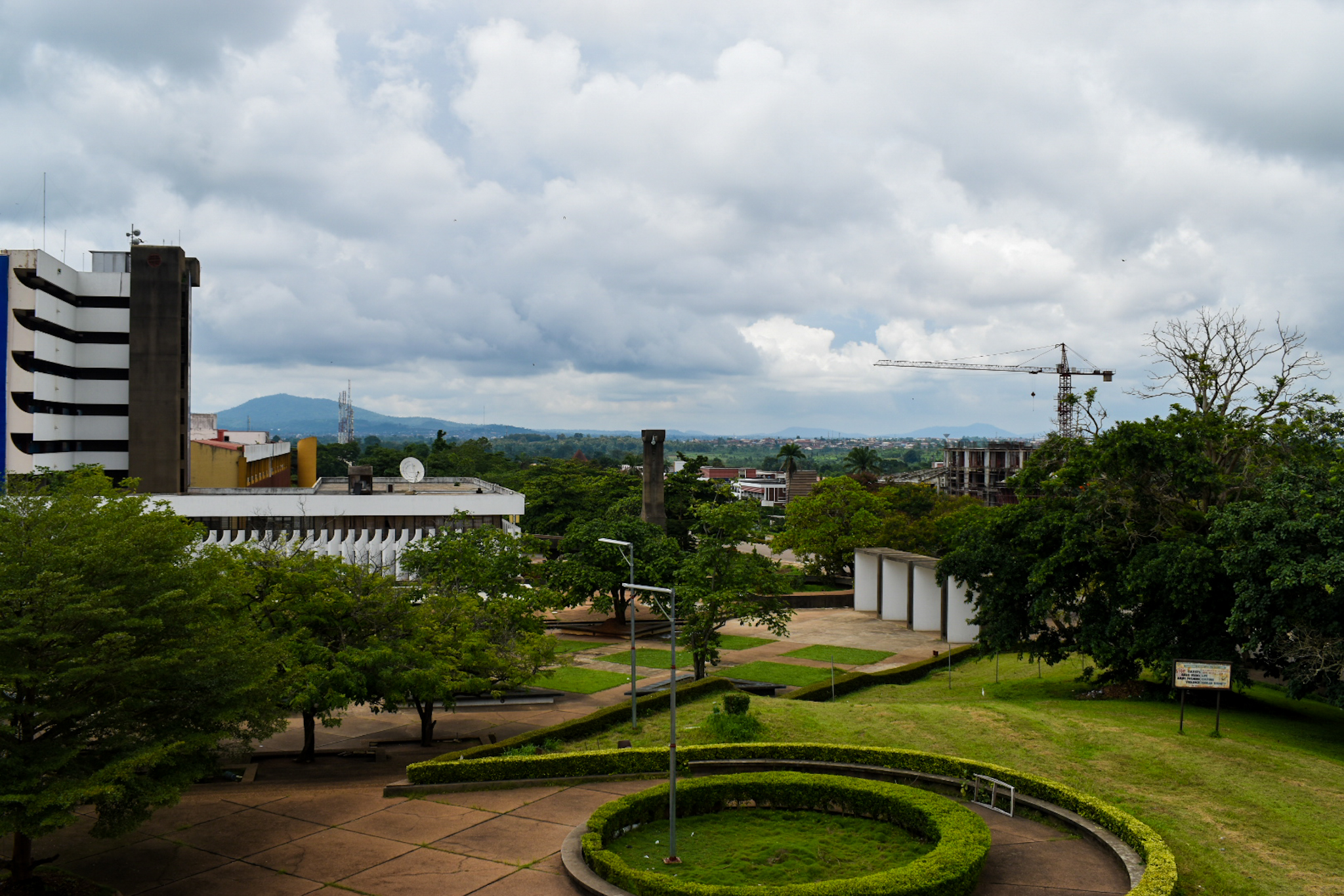
Obafemi Awolowo University, formerly known as Ife University, in Nigeria

John Olubi Sodipo (15 October 1935 – 4 December 1999) was a Nigerian philosopher and educator.

== Early life and education ==
Sodipo attended Remo Secondary School, Sagamu, from 1948 to 1953. He studied at the University of Ibadan from 1956 to 1960 and at Durham University, England, from 1961 to 1964.

== Career ==
Sodipo lectured at the University of Ibadan from 1964 to 1966. He taught philosophy at the University of Lagos from 1966 and at Obafemi Awolowo University from 1968 to 1982. He served as the first professor of African philosophy and as the first head of the Department of Philosophy. He became the first vice-chancellor of Ogun State University when it opened in 1982. Sodipo was the founder and editor of Second Order: An African Journal of Philosophy.

== Second Order: An African Journal of Philosophy ==
Second Order : An African Journal of Philosophy was a journal established by John Olubi Sodipo in 1972 at Obafemi Awolowo University in Nigeria, known as the University of Ife at the time. Its purpose was primarily to create a discourse about philosophy specifically in Africa and the culture and values of the African diaspora.

The existence and legitimacy of African philosophy had been argued among both African and Western philosophers. A key distinction in the debate is that first order philosophy concerns the questions in the world regarding reality, knowledge, ethics, and existence in general while second order philosophy is the critical thought and analysis about said questions. Western culture considers the second order to be what the study and the profession of philosophy is made up of. A significant argument perpetuated by several critics, such as the French philosopher and anthropologist Lucien Levy-Bruhl, is that African people were incapable of using second order reflection. This claim was foundational to colonial and anthropological discourse. Second Order included several entries written to display various significant strides in the profession added upon by those in the profession such as Kwasi Wiredu, W. A. Hart., Henry Odera Oruka, etc. It directly challenged this view by publishing work illustrating not only the presence of philosophical thinking in African cultures but also the African scholars engaging in sophisticated analytic, critical, and methodological reflection.

The journal lasted for several years, due to a difficulty with funding it ended.

== Barry Hallen ==
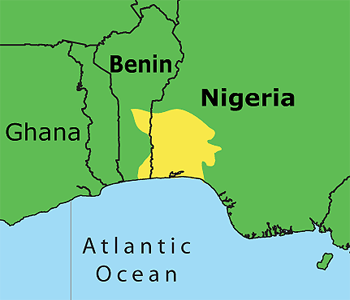
Location of Yoruba Peoples

John Olubi Sodipo collaborated with Barry Hallen, American philosopher, author, and professor of Philosophy in the U.S., on studies regarding African Philosophy. Their collaborative works primarily focused on understanding the epistemological ideas of the Yoruba. Their idea was based on W. V. Quine's idea that the philosophy of people are entirely dependent on their language and physical context, making it impossible to fully understand another group's ideologies especially when dealing with entirely different languages. Their writings were based on their studies involving interviewing onisegun, Yoruba doctors or traditional herbalists, through an interlocutor and translating their responses into English. Their approach to language is considered the Ordinary Language Analysis method; when analyzing culture through the common usages of words in their language.

In 1986, Hallen and Sodipo published the book Knowledge, Belief, and Witchcraft: Analytic Experiments in African Philosophy . Additionally they wrote a notable article called “The House of the Inu: Keys to the Structure of a Yoruba Theory of the Self” which was published in 1994 within the June issue of the Quest: Philosophical Discussions. Both were based on their studies when talking with the onisegun. The primary criticism of their ideas is that there are likely misunderstandings and oversimplifications in the method of Ordinary Language Analysis due to the inability to directly translate words that are conceptually complex. Their studies were frequently compared to Oruka's sage philosophy, which Oruka originally disagreed with.
