= Kwame Gyekye =

Ghanaian philosopher (1939–2019)

- Born: Kwame Gyekye; November 10, 1939; Ghana
- Died: April 13, 2019 (aged 79); Ghana
- Citizenship: Ghana
- Education: Mfantsipim School; University of Ghana; Harvard University PhD)
- Scientific career
- Fields: African philosophy; African-American studies
- Workplaces: Temple University; University of Ghana
- Thesis: Græco–Arabic philosophy

Kwame Gyekye (10 November 1939 – 13 April 2019) was a Ghanaian philosopher, and an important figure in the development of modern African philosophy. Gyekye was an emeritus professor of philosophy at the University of Ghana, and a visiting professor of philosophy and African-American studies at Temple University. He is known for theorizing the concept of person-hood on the basis of Akan cultural paradigm in debate with Kwasi Wiredu, which is seen as one of the defining moments of modern African philosophy. Notable is his presentation and defense of moderate communitarianism (or MC), which can be understood as a political theory rooted in principles of common good and dignity.

== Biography ==
=== Early life ===
In 1939, Kwame Gyekye was born in Ahanta, located in the western region of Ghana, then known as the Gold Coast. He grew up steeped in the cultural and familial traditions of the Akan people, one of Ghana's largest ethnic groups. Throughout his youth he learned traditional proverbs and oral traditions about humanity, identity, and personhood. This childhood setting directly influenced his philosophical career, as he centered his scholarship on the exploration of indigenous values, structures, and cultural norms he was exposed to in his youth.

Gyekye grew up during a critical political transition period, as Britain's colonial rule slowly waned until Ghana's independence in 1957. He witnessed the formation of a new Ghanaian national identity, again influencing his later philosophical work.

=== Education and scholarship ===
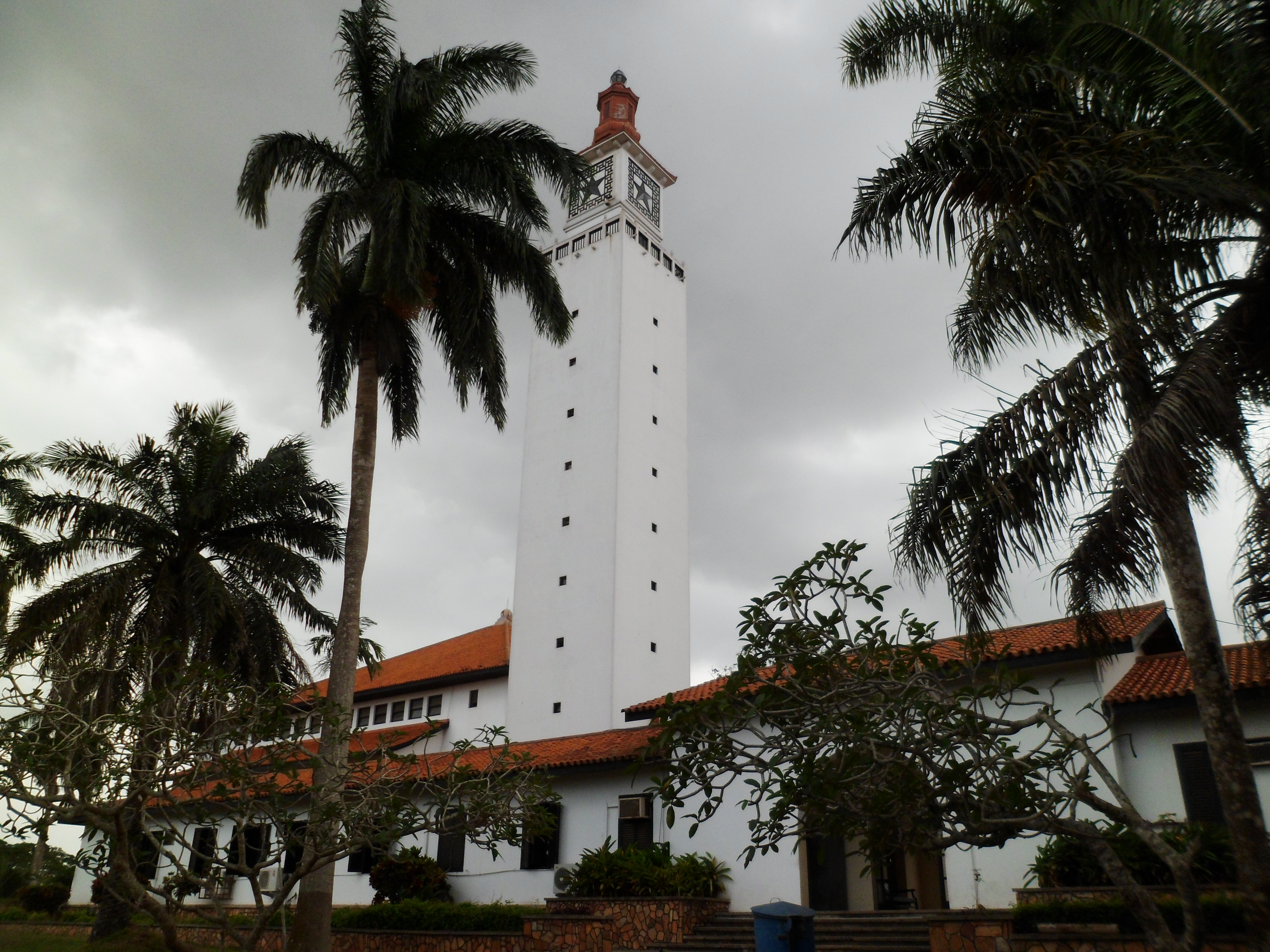
University of Ghana campus in Legon

Gyekye was educated at Mfantsipim School and local primary and secondary schools. In the mid-1950s, he enrolled at the University of Ghana at Legon, where he studied history, linguistics, and philosophy, focusing on Western philosophers such as Plato, Kant, and Hegel. He studied briefly at the University of Oxford in the United Kingdom on a scholarship before entering Harvard University, where he earned a PhD with a dissertation on Greco-Arabic philosophy.

Gyekye taught philosophy at the University of Ghana for more than 40 years, eventually serving as head of the department. During his tenure, he helped revise the curriculum to integrate indigenous African philosophies. He was also the first dean of graduate studies at the Ghana Armed Forces Command and Staff College (GAFCSC), a fellow of the Smithsonian Institution's Woodrow Wilson International Center for Scholars, and a lifetime fellow of the Ghana Academy of Arts and Sciences.

Internationally, Gyekye held visiting lectureships, contributed regularly to philosophical literature, and represented African philosophy in global academic organizations. He also took part in community-based cultural preservation initiatives.

=== Other work ===
Gyekye contributed to political efforts which advanced inclusionary politics, stating "It evokes in every individual citizen a sense of belonging and of being a member of the political community; it makes self-government fundamentally meaningful and real, and allows for continuity and survival of government measures and projects." He advocated for a private members bill in Ghanaian Parliament which would give oridinary citizens a voice in government.

=== Personal life ===
Gyekye fostered strong relationships with other African philosophers, notably Paulin Hountondji and Kwasi Wiredu despite their scholastic disagreements. He frequently collaborated with them and other scholars.

== Philosophical work ==
=== Person and community ===
Gyekye challenges the view that in African thought, community confers personhood on the individual and thus the individual's identity is merely derivative of the community. He attributes this view to African philosopher Ifeanyi Menkiti, as well as socialist political figures like Ghana's Kwame Nkrumah, Senegal's Léopold Senghor, and Tanzania's Julius Nyerere.

Gye Nyame (Adinkra Symbol) meaning "Except God."

Instead, Gyekye argues that African thought ascribes definite value to the individual. He cites an Akan proverb, "All persons are children of God; no one is a child of the earth" in support of his argument that a person is conceived as a theomorphic being, having in their nature an aspect of God. This soul (known as okra to the Akan) is described as divine and originating with God. Thus, he argues, a person is viewed as more than just a material or physical object, but children of God, and therefore intrinsically valuable. This intrinsic value, it is argued, makes nonsense of the view that the individual's value stems solely from the community. Similarly, he argues that the person is conceived as a unique individual (as in the proverb "antelope's soul is one, duiker's another"), so that each individual is self-complete, and the reality of the person cannot be derivative and posterior to that of the community.

While Gyekye argues that the individual is ontologically complete, he also acknowledges that people live in community, as in the proverb, "When a person descends from heaven, he/she descends into a human society." In his view, a person's abilities are not sufficient for survival, so that community is necessary for the survival of the individual, as articulated in the proverb, "A person is not a palm tree that he/she should be self-sufficient."

Thus, he argues, it is an error to hold that African philosophy denies the individual, but instead, the individual is an intrinsically valuable child of God, intricately linked into a web of human relationships. He cites a Ghanaian artist who wrote, "we are linked together like a chain; we are linked in life, we are linked in death; persons who share a common blood relation never break away from one another."

=== Moderate communitarianism ===
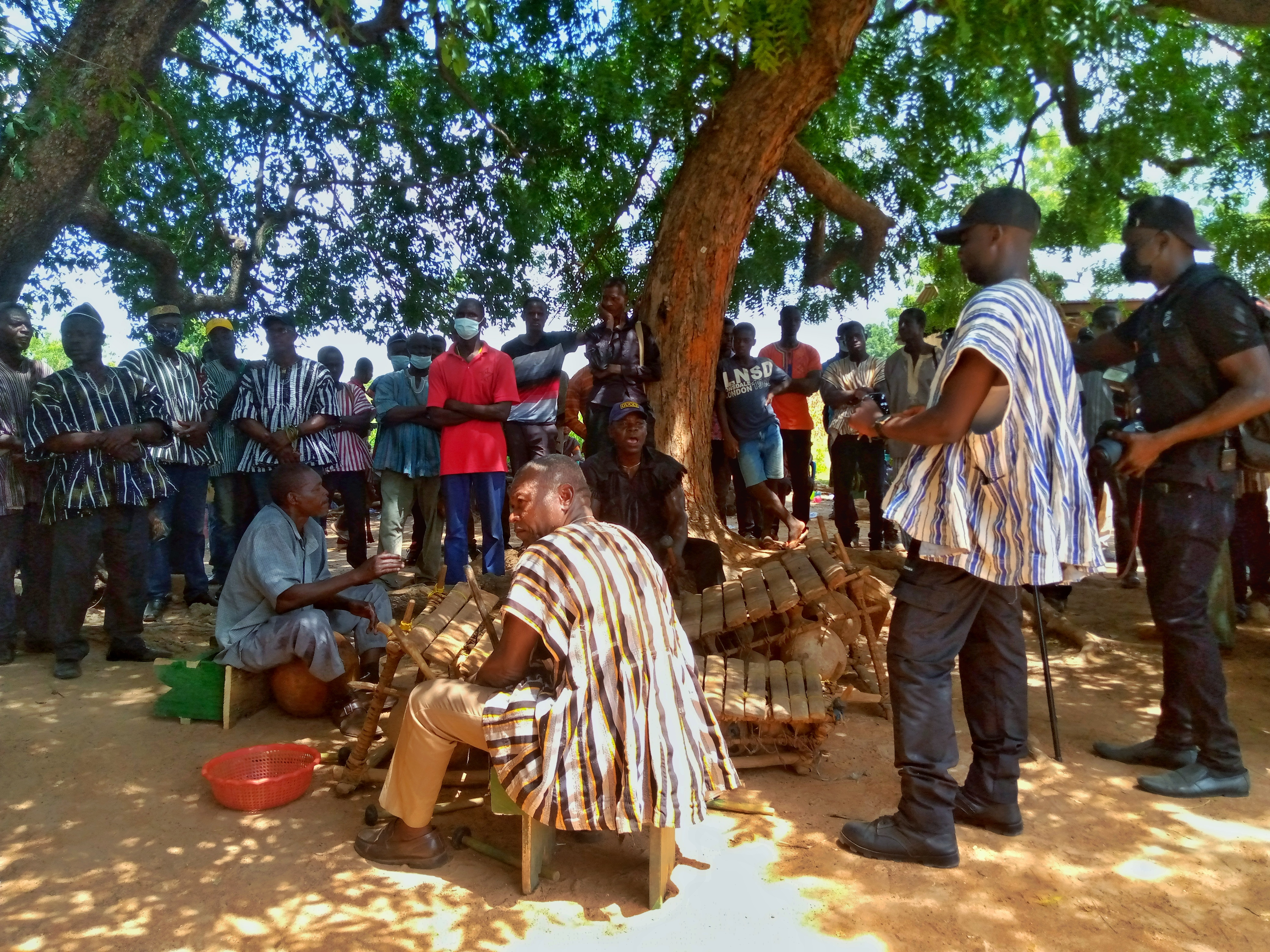
A Namdom community in Ghana

Kwame Gyekye's moderate communitarianism emerges as a response the duty based view of communitarianism argued by Ifeanyi Menkiti. This perspective posits obligations in social relations are superior to individual rights.

In Tradition and Modernity: Philosophical Reflections on the African Experience Gyekye meditates on this perspective with worry that it harms individuals in society by denying self-actualization and personal expression. He defines this form of communitarianism as 'radical', and offers moderate communitarianism as an alternative.

Moderate communitarianism balances individual value with that of the community. This perspective argues that while individuals are members of a community this does not imply a homogenous experience, and thus they have inherent personal rights and dignity. It is a framework guided by moral autonomy and personhood which generates individual and community responsibility.

=== Indigenous culture ===
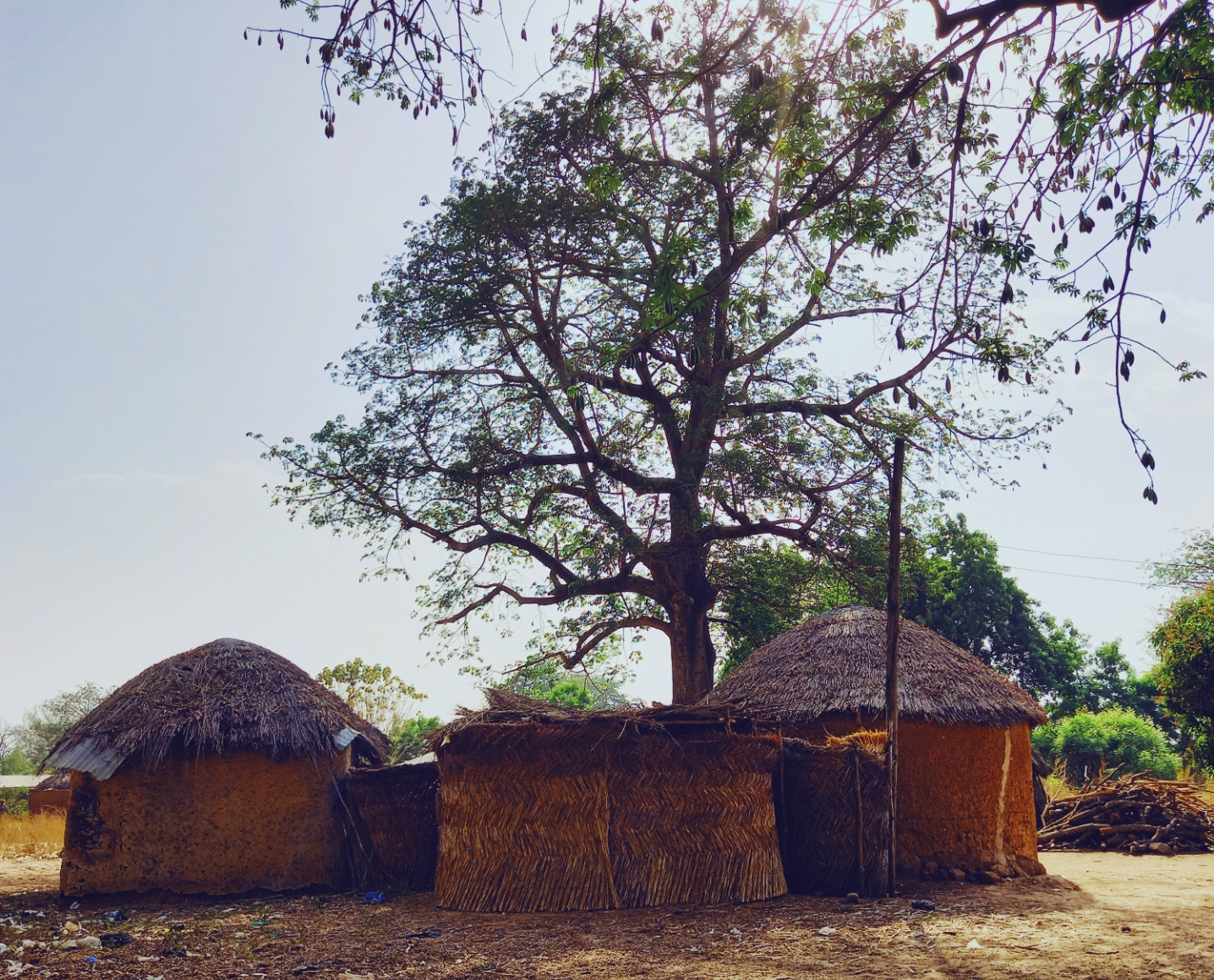
An indigenous settlement in Ghana

In Beyond Cultures: Perceiving a Common Humanity, Gyekye argues that the ethos of humanity practiced in indigenous cultures offers an adequate framework for modern transformation of society which extends beyond borders or ethnic lines. Gyekye posits that African nations should look to indigenous cultures as a guide which can be adapted to modern needs. He believes this because these cultures based their philosophies around meeting the needs of humanity, even if their practices may have had specific relevance for a particular ethnic group/region.

The practices must be updated and adapted, however, and to reify this point, Gyekye cites an indigenous proverb which states "A person cutting a path does not know that the part that he has cleared behind him is crooked." In the context of his argument, this means that African leaders today must identify what aspects of indigenous culture work in their modern societies and leave behind what is 'crooked'.

== Debates with other philosophers ==
Kwame Gyekye frequently disagreed with other African philosophers on various issues. Notable was his assertion that African philosophy has the same rigor, relevance, and scholarly weight as Western philosophy and can rightly be considered a part of the global philosophical tradition. As described by Gyekye in a 1997 interview, "African philosophy consists of fundamental inquires and analyses into the African cultural and historical experience." This opinion was in direct opposition to Henry Odera Oruka, Kwasi Wiredu, Paulin Hountonji, and Peter Bodunrin, who did not believe African philosophy could be considered in the same philosophical camp as thought of Western and Greek origin`

=== Kwasi Wiredu and Gyekye ===
Notably, Kwame Gyekye and Kwasi Wiredu frequently engaged in debate regarding their different perspectives on the indigenous conception of personhood.

They largely disagreed on the nature and impact of the relationship between society and individual personhood. Wiredu argues that Akan philosophy delineates personhood on a degreed basis and that there is a difference between the biological entity of the human and the metaphysical entity of the person. He uses the Akan word onipa to justify this analysis because the word simultaneously means a biological species member and a human that has attained special social status. He posits this implies personhood is something to be attained at different levels based on personal achievement rather than a state of being (ie. a human).

Comparatively, Gyekye takes issues with this conception of a person, and argues that human's possess innate moral equality because of their common humanity. He believes humanity takes precedence and that personhood is not continuous property which ranges in degree based on how much one can acquire. Personhood is not one's character traits or status in life, rather it is an independent condition all humans possess.

=== Similarities/agreements ===
Gyekye and Wiredu both justified their arguments by citing indigenous proverbs and words. Both approached indigenous thought as a genuine philosophical field which required rigorous study and preservation.

Aside from Kwasi Wiredu, he agreed and collaborated with other philosophers in his same indigenous analytical perspective such as Sophie Oluwole, K. C. Anyanwu and Chukwudum B. Okolo. These individuals also believed in African philosophy's place in the global philosophical canon.

== Impact on African philosophy and politics ==
Regarding Gyekye's influence, at a memorial lecture in April 2024 at the University of Ghana Justice Emmanuel Yonny Kulendi stated "His belief in eschewing individualism in favor of chorusing communitarianism should serve as a guiding principle for fostering a more responsible citizenship."

At the same event, Associate Professor of Philosophy at the University of Ghana Martin Odei Ajei similarly stated "Beyond his academic endeavors, Prof. Gyekye emerged as a staunch advocate for African Unity and development, championing African solutions to African problems."

Gyekye contributed significantly to the debate of African philosophy's position in the global philosophical canon. His perspective that African modes of thought could rightly be considered philosophy challenged Western authority on what is considered knowledge, and what is not. Additionally, Gyekye's consistent engagement with scholars of differing opinions contributed to bolstering the intellectual rigor and capacity of African philosophy as a field.

== Bibliography ==
- 1971: "The Terms ‘Prima Intentio‘ and ‘Secunda Intentio’ in Arabic Logic" (Speculum 46, pp. 32–38)
- 1975: "Philosophical relevance of Akan proverbs" (Second Order: An African Journal of Philosophy 4:2, pp. 45–53)
- 1977: "Akan language and the materialism thesis: a short essay on the relations between philosophy and language" (Studies in Language 1:1, pp 237 44)
- 1978: "Akan concept of a person" (International Philosophical Quarterly 18:3, pp. 277–87)
- 1987: An Essay on African Philosophical Thought: The Akan Conceptual Scheme
  - (Cambridge: Cambridge University Press)
  - 1995: revised edition (Philadelphia: Temple University Press) ISBN 1-56639-380-9
- 1988: The Unexamined Life: Philosophy and the African Experience (Ghana Universities Press)
- 1991: "Man as a moral subject: the perspective of an African philosophical anthropology" in The Quest for Man: The Topicality of Philosophical Anthropology, ed. Joris van Nispens & Douwe Tiemersma (Assen/Maastricht, Netherlands: VanGorcum)
- 1992a: (ed. Gyekye & Kwasi Wiredu) Person and Community: Ghanaian Philosophical Studies 1 (Washington D.C.: The Council for Research in Values and Philosophy)
- 1992b: "Person and Community" in 1992a
- 1992c: "Traditional political ideas and values" in 1992a
- 1995: "Aspects of African communitarian thought" (The Responsive Community: Rights and Responsibilities)
- 2000: "Beyond Cultures: Perceiving a Common Humanity" (J.B Danquah memorial lectures)

== Secondary literature ==
- "A Defense of Kwame Gyekye’s Moderate Communitarianism", Kibujjo M. Kalumba, Philosophical Papers Volume 49, 2020 - Issue 1.
- "Ethical Thought of Kwasi Wiredu and Kwame Gyekye", George Kotei Neequaye, The Palgrave Handbook of African Social Ethics.
- "The apparent conflict of transcendentalism and immanentism In Kwame Gyekye And Kwasi Wiredu's interpretation of the Akan concept of God", Ada Agada, Filosofia Theoretica Journal of African Philosophy Culture and Religions 6(1):23-38
- A Critical Exposition of Kwame Gyekye's Communitarianism, O. S. Mwimnobi, Master of Arts thesis submitted in the University of South Africa (2003).
