= Edwin Etieyibo =

Nigerian-Canadian philosopher

Edwin Ekwevukugbe Etieyibo is a Nigerian-Canadian (Afro-Canadian) philosopher dedicated to advancing African philosophy. He is an advocate of the validity of ethnophilosophy. This view has been criticised by a number of scholars and philosophers who argue that traditional African philosophy and ethnophilosophy are not genuine philosophy. Etieyibo is Professor of philosophy at the University of the Witwatersrand, Johannesburg, South Africa. He served as Chair of the Department of Philosophy from 2018 to 2024. He is also an adjunct professor at the University of Alberta.

== Early life and education ==
Etieyibo was born in Adeje, Delta State, Nigeria, to Samuel Etieyibo and Idolor Etieyibo. He attended Amuane Primary School (Amuane), Ethiope Primary School (Amukpe-Sapele), Okpe Grammar School (Amukpe-Sapele) and Okotie-Eboh Grammar School (Sapele).

He studied in Nigeria, Canada and South Africa. He got admission to the University of Lagos, where he graduated in 1998 with a BA (first class honours) in philosophy (with minor in English and English Literature), an MA in 2001 (cum laude) in philosophy, and an MBA in 2015 (with a research focus on management, work ethics, and motivational theories).

In 2009, Etieyibo received his PhD from the University of Alberta working on the dissertation entitled, David Gauthier’s Moral Contractarianism and the Problem of Secession. His dissertation, under the supervision of Wesley Cooper, Adam Morton and externally examined by Jan Narveson, cuts across a number of disciplines including ethics, political philosophy, economics and decision theory and presents a critical examination of Gauthier’s account of morality that links rationality with preferences explained by expected utility.

In 2013, Etieyibo enrolled for an LLB degree at the University of South Africa and graduated in 2017, writing his portfolio/research essay on law, education and rights, with the title: “School Governing Bodies, Education Departments, and the Constitutionally Guaranteed Access to Education in South Africa.”

== Work and research ==
Etieyibo sees philosophy as liberatory both in form and content. He is among scholars and philosophers promulgating the notion of Africanising philosophy and the validation of ethnophilosophy. Ethnophilosophy has been criticized and defended by some scholars in various literature discourse and critiques. Some of the most forceful critiques of ethnophilosophy come from the prominent African philosopher, Paulin Hountondji.

Etieyibo was a member of the African Philosophy Society’s international steering committee for the third biennial African Philosophy World Conference in Dar es Salaam, Tanzania in 2019.

In 2018, he presented one of the keynote addresses at the biennial conference of the International Social Ontology Society in Boston, Massachusetts.

He served as the Editor-in-Chief of the South African Journal of Philosophy between 2018 and 2023, the Secretary/Treasurer of the International Society for African Philosophy and Studies (2014-2023). Currently, he is the Secretary of the African Philosophy Society — an organization for which he is a co-founder. He has been named the Association for Research on Civil Society in Africa (AROCSA) champion of the week.

His interests include, social and political philosophy, applied ethics, social and global justice, philosophy for children, African philosophy, African socio-political economy, epistemology, Descartes, rights and disabilities. This has been the focus of his research works in impacting and contributions to Africanising philosophy and the philosophy curriculum in ways that respond to different traditions of philosophy, especially the African philosophical traditions (also referred to as African philosophy) consistent with the demands of intercultural philosophy.

He is the co-author (with Odirin Omiegbe) of the monograph, Disabilities in Nigeria: Attitudes, Reactions, and Remediation published by Hamilton Books (now Bloomsbury) (2017); https://www.bloomsbury.com/us/disabilities-in-nigeria-9780761887737/, and author/co-author of two more monographs including A Case for Environmental Justice published in 2022 by Rowman and Littlefield (now Bloomsbury); https://www.bloomsbury.com/ca/case-for-environmental-justice-9780761873822/. In addition to these, he has edited and co-edited over 10 books, seven special journal issues, and published over one hundred journal articles and book chapters in several diverse and interrelated areas including: ethics, social and political philosophy, applied ethics, social and global justice, culture, rights and disabilities, social contract theories/and history of, African philosophy, African socio-political economy, epistemology, and Descartes, intercultural philosophy, and comparative philosophy.

== Selected publications ==
=== Selected edited Books ===
- Etieyibo, Edwin E., ed. (2019). Perspectives in Social Contract Theory. Council for Research in Values and Philosophy. Cultural heritage and contemporary change. Vol. 21. Washington, DC: Council for Research in Values & Philosophy. ISBN 978-1565183315.
- Etieyibo, Edwin, ed. (April 16, 2018). Method, Substance, and the Future of African Philosophy. Palgrave Macmillan. doi:10.1007/978-3-319-70226-1. ISBN 978-3-319-70225-4. Archived from the original on December 20, 2019 – via www.palgrave.com.
- Etieyibo, Edwin, ed. (2018). Decolonisation, Africanisation and the Philosophy Curriculum. London and New York: Routledge. ISBN 9781138570368. Archived from the original on 2020-08-03.
- Etieyibo, Edwin; Chimakonam, Jonathan O., eds. (2018). Ka Osi Sọ Onye: African Philosophy African philosophy in the Postmodern Era. Wilmington, DE: Vernon Press. ISBN 978-1-62273-366-8.
- Etieyibo, Edwin (2017). Disabilities in Nigeria: Attitudes, Reactions, and Remediation. Lanham, MD: Hamilton Books. ISBN 978-0761869054.
- Etieyibo, Edwin; Omiegbe, Odirin (2017). Disabilities in Nigeria: Attitudes, Reactions, and Remediation. Hamilton Books. ISBN 978-0761869054.

=== Selected book chapters ===
- Etieyibo, Edwin (2022). "African Proverbs". In Chimakonam, Jonathan O.; Cordeiro-Rodrigues, Luis (eds.). African Ethics: A Guide to Key Ideas. Bloomsbury. pp. 31–50.
- Etieyibo, Edwin (2019). "African Philosophy and Nonhuman Nature". In Hull, George (ed.). Debating African Philosophy: Perspectives on Identity, Decolonial Ethics and Comparative Philosophy. London, UK: Routledge. pp. 164–181. ISBN 9781138344969.
- Chimakonam, Jonathan O.; Etieyibo, Edwin (2018). "African Philosophy in the Court of Postmodernism". Ka Osi Sọ Onye: African Philosophy in the Postmodern Era. Wilmington, DE: Vernon Press. pp. 191–205. ISBN 978-1-62273-366-8.
- Etieyibo, Edwin (2018). "Afri-decolonisation, Decolonisation, Africanisation and the Task of an Africanised Philosophy Curriculum". Decolonisation, Africanisation and the Philosophy Curriculum. London and New York: Routledge. pp. 8–18. ISBN 9781138570368.
- Etieyibo, Edwin (2018). "Why Ought the Philosophy Curriculum in Universities in Africa be Africanised?". Decolonisation, Africanisation and the Philosophy Curriculum. London and New York: Routledge. pp. 89–102. ISBN 9781138570368.
- Etieyibo, Edwin (2018). "African Philosophy in History, Context, and Contemporary Times". Method, Substance, and the Future of African Philosophy. New York: Palgrave Macmillan. pp. 13–33. ISBN 978-3-319-70225-4.
- Etieyibo, Edwin; Chimakonam, Jonathan O (2018). "The State of African Philosophy in Africa". Method, Substance, and the Future of African Philosophy. New York: Palgrave Macmillan. p. 71. ISBN 978-3-319-70225-4.
- Etieyibo, Edwin; Oyowe, Anthony Oritsegbubemi (2018). "Ubuntu and Social Contract Theory". Perspectives in Social Contract Theory. Washington, DC: The Council for Research in Values and Philosophy. pp. 343–365. ISBN 978-1565183315.
- Etieyibo, Edwin (2018). "Moral Contractarianism, Moral Skepticism, and Agreement". Perspectives in Social Contract Theory. Washington, DC: The Council for Research in Values and Philosophy. pp. 213–230. ISBN 978-1565183315.
- Etieyibo, Edwin (2018). "Between Contractualism and Contractarianism". Perspectives in Social Contract Theory. Washington, DC: The Council for Research in Values and Philosophy. pp. 11–26. ISBN 978-1565183315.

=== Selected journal articles ===
- Etieyibo, Edwin (2025) "Hountondji, Unanimism, and the Possibility of a Communal Mind," Arumaruka:Journal of Conversational Thinking, 5(1): 41-61, https://www.ajol.info/index.php/ajct/article/view/309156.
- Etieyibo, Edwin (December 2016). "Why Ought the Philosophy Curriculum in Universities in Africa be Africanized?". South African Journal of Philosophy. 35 (4): 404–417. doi:10.1080/02580136.2016.1242208. S2CID 151416682.
- Etieyibo, Edwin (2016). "African Philosophy in the Eyes of the West". Phronimon. 17 (1): 84–103. doi:10.17159/2413-3086/2016/117.
- Etieyibo, Edwin (2016). "Guest Editor's Introduction: The Task of Africanizing the Philosophy Curriculum". South African Journal of Philosophy. 35 (4): 377–382. doi:10.1080/02580136.2016.1256662.
- Etieyibo, Edwin (2015). "Descartes and Epistemology With or Without God". Philosophia: International Journal of Philosophy. 16 (1): 65–58.
- Etieyibo, Edwin (2014). "Themes in Brand Blanshard's Coherence Theory of Truth". Philosophia: International Journal of Philosophy. 15 (1): 11–24.
- Etieyibo, Edwin (2013). "Bargaining and Agreement in Gauthier's Moral Contractarianism". South African Journal of Philosophy. 32 (3): 221–233. doi:10.1080/02580136.2013.837652. S2CID 144244083.
- Etieyibo, Edwin (2012). "Genetic Enhancement, Social Justice, and Welfare-oriented Patterns of Distribution". Bioethics. 26 (6): 296–304. doi:10.1111/j.1467-8519.2010.01872.x. PMID 21320142. S2CID 42763800.
- Etieyibo, Edwin (2011). "The Ethical Dimension of Ubuntu and its Relationship to Environmental Sustainability". Journal of African Environmental Ethics and Values. 1 (1): 116–130.
- Etieyibo, Edwin (2011). "God is dead!' Nietzsche's Zarathustra and Some Reflections on Religiosity in Nigeria". The Nigerian Journal of Philosophy. 24 (1): 1–17.
- Etieyibo, Edwin (2011). "An Outline of an Ecumenical Environmental Ethic". The Trumpeter. 7 (3): 47–59.
- Etieyibo, Edwin (2011). "Privatization in Nigeria, Social Welfare, and the Obligation of Social Justice". Journal of Economics. 2 (1): 37–442011. doi:10.1080/09765239.2011.11884935. S2CID 158795031.
- Etieyibo, E. (2011). "Political Reparationists and the Moral Case for Reparations to Africa for Colonialism". Africa Insight. 40 (4). doi:10.4314/ai.v40i4.65927.
- Etieyibo, Edwin (2010). "Cartesian Hyperbolic Doubts and the 'Painting Analogy' in the First Meditation". Diametros. 24: 45–57.
