= Henry Odera Oruka =

Kenyan philosopher

- Born: Henry; 1 June 1944; Nyanza Province
- Died: 9 December 1995 (aged 51)
- Education: Wayne State University
- Occupation: philosopher University teacher
- Known for: philosophy
- Awards: Fellow of the Kenya National Academy of Sciences

Henry Odera Oruka (1 June 1944, in Siaya County – 9 December 1995, in Nairobi) was a Kenyan philosopher who is best known for "Sage Philosophy". It was a project started in the 1970’s in an attempt to preserve the knowledge of the indigenous thinkers in traditional African communities.

== Life and work ==
Henry Odera Oruka was born on 1 June 1944 in Masiro-Nyang'ungu, Ugenya, Siaya County. After his advanced level studies in Kenya, he went to Uppsala University in Sweden. There he registered for a BSc programme in the Faculty of Mathematics–Natural Science and studied meteorology, Geography, and Geodesy. He later added Philosophy to his studies because of his interest in the subject. Upon graduating in Science and Philosophy (a year ahead of his class), he opted to drop science and continue with his studies in philosophy. He moved to Wayne State University in the United States of America for his master's degree where he completed his studies and eventually obtained a PhD. His dissertation on the theme of "Freedom" (written in 1970) was later refined and published as Punishment and Terrorism in Africa in 1976. From October 1970 until his death on 9 December 1995, he taught philosophy at the University of Nairobi.

The majority and dominant staff at the Department of Philosophy and Religious Studies which had been launched in 1969 at the University of Nairobi were priests and lay theologians. They had little time for "African Philosophy" as they harbored doubts about the ability of Africans to think logically. After years of a sustained and bitter struggle spearheaded by Odera Oruka, Philosophy was separated from Religion at the university in July 1980 and he was appointed the Founder-Chairman of the new Department of Philosophy. Unfortunately for the department, the death of Odera Oruka was accompanied with a marked decline in the international profile of Philosophy at the University of Nairobi. The discipline that Odera Oruka worked so hard to separate from Religion has since been merged with Religion once again.

Odera Oruka was the founder-president of the Philosophical Association of Kenya (PAK); the founding-director of the International Institute of Environmental Studies (IIES), Nairobi; a member of the Kenya National Academy of Sciences (KNAS); the secretary-general of African Futures Studies Association (AFSA); the secretary-general of the Afro-Asian Philosophical Association (AAPA); vice-president of the Inter-African Council of Philosophy (IACP); a member of the executive committee of both the Federation International de societe philosophique (FISP) and World Futures Studies Federation. On June 3, 1993, he received an honorary doctorate from the Faculty of Humanities from Uppsala University.

== Personal life ==
Odera Oruka was married twice. His first wife, the late Millicent Achien'g, bore him three children: Owiso Odera (the deceased Hollywood actor), Sheila Odera (Veteran Actress/Model and Accountant), and Sharon Odera(deceased). He had two children with his second wife, Olivia Phoebe Ayoma, namely Ronnie Omuga and Peter Oruka Odera (an International relations practitioner).

== Basic philosophical beliefs ==
Three philosophical approaches can be seen in Oruka's works:

Socio-economic deprivation

Poverty and hunger in Africa are the greatest constraints to mental development and creativity. But, rather than complaining about imperialism, colonialism, foreign cultural domination etc., the remedy should be looked for by a process of self-national examination and critique.

Cultural racial mythology

The fight against cultural and racial mythologies was one of his main topics. He differentiated two types of myths: Myths about the level of civilisation and nobility of some races as opposed to the backwardness and slave mentality of others. The second myth is about the philosophic-scientific gifts of certain races and the corresponding lack in other races, Africa always being on the ungifted and uncivilised side of the scale.

Illusion of appearance

He divided the meaning of appearance into three parts. In the first part, he describes a reliance on outward appearance as a disease of most people in the society. The second meaning is appearance as it is manipulated by business tycoons and others in power to boost their rank and influence. In the third part, the philosophical level, appearance becomes an obstacle to intellectual activity. This type of appearance is prominent in the field of education, where people are taught styles rather than substance. The result is not knowledge but prejudice, racism, tribalism, sexism and irrational indifference to other cultures. This prompted him to analyse concepts to arrive at generally accepted truth rather than relying on mere appearance.

=== The existence of an independent African philosophy ===
There has been considerable (and often acrimonious) debate about the pre-Western existence of an independent African philosophy and what its nature might be. Odera Oruka identified four trends or approaches in this discussion.

Ethnophilosophy

Describes the worldview or thought-system of particular African communities as philosophy. This type of philosophy sees the African way of thinking as "communal thought" and describes its emotional appeal as one of its unique features. Examples of those holding this position are: Placide Tempels, Leopold Sedar Senghor, John S. Mbiti, and Alexis Kagame.

Nationalistic-Ideological philosophy

Consists of works of founding-fathers and statesmen in Africa, whose social-political theories were based on traditional African socialism and family values. Among them were: Kwame Nkrumah, Sekou Toure, Julius Nyerere, and Kenneth Kaunda.

Professional philosophy

This is the position generally taken by professionally trained students or teachers of philosophy. They reject Ethnophilosophy and instead adopt a universalistic point of view. In their opinion, African philosophy should be approached with the same forms of critical analysis applied to mainstream Western philosophy. A descriptive approach, by itself, is more appropriate to the field of anthropology and applies different standards to African thought. Philosophers belonging to this trend include: Kwasi Wiredu, Paulin Hountondji, Peter O. Bodunrin, and Odera Oruka.

== Philosophic Sagacity ==
Philosophic Sagacity is Odera Oruka's research project begun in the early 1970s designed to preserve the philosophical thoughts of traditional Kenyan sages. The basic principle of Philosophic Sagacity is that in both traditional and modern Africa there exist women and men, illiterate and literate, who commonly engage in philosophical reflection on various problems of human life and nature in general.

Unlike ethnophilosophy, which emphasises communal thinking, Philosophic Sagacity searches for individual thinkers in the traditional community. These "sages" express and defend their philosophical thoughts and opinions on various issues of nature and human life. Some of these thoughts even if not philosophical in the strict sense could nevertheless constitute raw data for technical philosophical reflections by professional or trained philosophers. Oruka wanted to point out that there is and was a philosophy in Africa in the fullest sense of the word: a philosophy that deals with daily human problems and issues which are common to every human being, such as the existence of a Deity, life, knowledge, death etc. Such issues are not the sole domain of literate people but are usually best addressed by the few who can "transcend" the communal way of thinking.

Though some have often equated "Sage Philosophy" with "Philosophic sagacity," Odera Oruka did not. Odera Oruka distinguished between two wings of Sage Philosophy: (1) being the folk or popular sagacity, and (2) being the philosophic sagacity. While the former expresses well known communal maxims, aphorisms and general common sense truths, the latter expresses the thoughts of wise men and women that transcend popular wisdom and attain a philosophic capacity. Hence whereas all instances of philosophic sagacity locate within sage philosophy, not every instance of sage philosophy constitute philosophic sagacity. The novelty of Odera Oruka's project is to be found in philosophic sagacity since the folk sagacity dimension of sage philosophy would be a fallback to ethnophilosophy.

=== The method ===
Odera Oruka and his colleagues went with tape recorders into villages of different ethnic communities in Kenya to engage those who were thought by their own communities to be wise. The discourses were held in the native language of the presumptive wise men or women. Each "wise statement" was challenged by the interlocutors. If the person had a philosophical frame of mind he/she would be able to offer rational answers to the objections or requests for clarification. If he/she had not, he/she gave unsatisfactory answers or perhaps was unable to reply. It was believed by this method true philosophy could be separated from popular wisdom.

=== Criticisms of Philosophic Sagacity ===
Philosophic Sagacity is not philosophy is the main argument of D. A. Masolo. Based on Socratic method, his analysis shows how frequently tradition and opinion are based on insufficient reasoning. For him, true philosophy relies on analysis, definition, and explanation. Pre-Socratic knowledge has no place in strict philosophy. Philosophic sagacity, he believes, falls into the category of pre-Socratic philosophy. Both fail in a consistent attitude towards, and practice of, rational explanation, despite the presence of the "sage" and the discourse with him/her. A mere discussion of a topic does not have the high degree of abstraction, conceptual analysis, and relation which, according to him, are the essence of strict philosophy.

Masolo also objects to the Afrocentric perspective inherent in Odera Oruka's approach to treating pre-literate African men and women as proto-philosophers. This appears to be a misunderstanding. For Odera Oruka, Philosophic Sagacity lies between ethnophilosophy and professional philosophy and is simply a starting point in determining the nature of African Philosophy.

In his essay, "The Philosopher and the Sage: On the Question of African Philosophy", Peter O. Bodunrin rejects Odera Oruka's notion that philosophic sagacity is philosophy because, for him, literacy is a necessary condition for philosophical reflections. His second, related, objection is one common to anthropology: the influence of the observer. If a philosopher interviews a "sage", is the result really the work of the "sage" or a joint product? Who is the actual creator of the "philosophy"? Odera Oruka responded to such thought by pointing out that thinking normally precedes writing and that the intent of the discourses is to produce raw material, to be used by the philosopher in his effort to prove that true philosophy exists on African soil.

Anthony Oseghare, a PhD student of Odera Oruka, makes a distinction between sagacity and knowledge. Both involve the acquisition and usage of skills, but they are not identical. Sagacity involves wisdom of a practical nature which is achieved through experience. It has a broader meaning than knowledge. Within sagacity too, there is a sagacity that stops with common sense and a sagacity that transcends common sense. Oseghare's critique, unlike Masolo's and Bodunrin's, is not negative but meant to clarify and enhance Odera Oruka's project.

A point worth noting is the distinction between sages and prophets. They could be confused in that both are concerned with efforts to resolve problems that affect human society. It is also true that a sage can be a prophet and a prophet can be a sage but the critical fact is that they are not identical. The basic difference – according to Odera Oruka – is that the prophet claims to predict the future based on past experience, whereas a sage is concerned with fundamental issues of ethics and other questions of immediate importance. A sage has the ability to offer insightful solutions to practical issues. Sages have existed in every society as custodians of its culture and values, regardless of literacy. After Odera Oruka's death philosophers who have continued to push the agenda of sagacity include Kenyan born scholars F. Ochieng'-Odhiambo and Oriare Nyarwath together with American Gail Presbey.

== Ethics ==
Lesser known are Odera Oruka's contributions to ethical questions, such as protection of the environment and the justification of foreign aid. In his article "The Philosophy of Foreign Aid" Odera Oruka responded to Garret Hardin's "Life Boat Theory". Hardin argues against helping poor nations because they will believe their problems are being solved, the population will grow, and the "boat" will sink.

Odera Oruka gave three possible reasons to justify foreign aid: charity (common decency), promoting international trade, and historical rectification. He later added another argument: the "right to a human minimum".

In his article "Parent Earth Ethics" Odera Oruka uses the metaphor of a family of six children with varying degrees of wealth and poverty to explain his argument. These six children have some things in common and each has his/her own individual talents and possessions. He made the following distinctions:

Rule One: Parental Debt Principle (a.) Family Security Rule (b.) Parental Debt Rule (c.) Individual Family Survival Rule

Rule Two: The Individual Luck Principle (a.) Personal Achievements Rule (b.) Personal Supererogation Rule (c.) Public Law Rule

The entire system cannot be detailed within the scope of this article but, from the above outline, the main points are as follows: The Parental Debt Principle occurs prior to the Individual Luck Principle. Under normal circumstances, if the first rule comes into conflict with anything in the second rule, the first rule takes priority. This is "the ethics of common sense". If the wealth and security of the community comes in conflict with personal luck or achievements, the former prevails over the latter. This type of ethics can be applied to both environmental concerns and the redistribution of wealth.

== Works ==
- Ochieng'-Odhiambo, F: African Philosophy: An Introduction, Consolata Institute of Philosophy Press (1997)
- Odera Oruka, Henry: Ethics, Nairobi University Press (1990) OCLC 23441714 ISBN 978-9966-846-04-4
- Odera Oruka, Henry: Philosophy, Humanity and Ecology, African Centre for Technology Studies (ACTS) Press, (1994) ISBN 9966-41-086-4
- Odera Oruka, Henry: The Philosophy of Liberty, Standard Textbooks Graphics and Pub. (1996) ISBN 9966-839-01-1
- Odera Oruka, Henry: Practical Philosophy, East African Educational Publishers (1997) ISBN 9966-46-704-1
- Odera Oruka, Henry: Punishment and Terrorism in Africa: Problems in the Philosophy and Practice of Punishment, 2nd ed. Kenya Literature Bureau (1985) ISBN 0-86070-423-8
- Odera Oruka, H: Oginga Odinga: His Philosophy and Beliefs, Initiatives Publishers (1992) ISBN 9966-42-035-5
- Odera Oruka, Henry: Sage Philosophy: Indigenous Thinkers and Modern Debate on African Philosophy (Philosophy of History and Culture, Vol. 4), E. J. Brill (1990) ISBN 90-04-09283-8
- Odera Oruka, Henry: Trends in Contemporary African Philosophy, Shirikon Publishers (1990) ISBN 9966-9842-6-7
- Odera Oruka, Henry and Masolo, D. A. (Eds.): Philosophy and Cultures, Proceedings of 2nd Afro-Asian Philosophy Conference, Nairobi, October/November 1981, Bookwise Ltd. (1983)

== See also ==
- Luo people of Kenya and Tanzania
