= Babcock University Teaching Hospital =

Nigerian teaching hospital

Geography
- Location: Ilishan-Remo, Ogun State, Nigeria

Organisation
- Care system: Private
- Type: Teaching
- Affiliated university: Babcock University

Services
- Emergency department: Yes
- Beds: 140

History
- Founded: 2012

Links
- Lists: Hospitals in Nigeria

Babcock University Teaching Hospital is a private hospital located in Ilishan-Remo, Ogun State, Nigeria. It serves as a training institute for clinical students studying at Babcock University. In 2022, 50 doctors resigned from the hospital for other opportunities abroad. The teaching hospital carried out its first knee replacement surgery in 2019 on a 70-year-old man with bilateral osteoarthritis.

== Controversies ==
In 2024, an 81-year-old patient was abandoned in the teaching hospital by his guardian, which raised concerns for the hospital management.

In June 2025, Babcock University dismissed a student, Oladipupo Siwajuola, for drug peddling, possession of fetish items, impersonation, and other violations of university policies. The university stated the disciplinary process followed due procedure and emphasized its commitment to maintaining campus integrity and safety.

In September 2024, Elizabeth Uruakpa, a senior nursing officer at Babcock University Teaching Hospital, was abducted by armed men near her residence in Ilisan Remo, Ogun State. She was released several days later, and the incident was investigated by the Ogun State Police Command.

== See also ==
- List of Seventh-day Adventist hospitals
