= Afrophone philosophy =

Afrophone philosophy refers to the use of African languages to express and elaborate philosophical ideas, critiques and analysis, establishing a distinct dimension of African philosophy from the academically prevalent use of European languages introduced during the colonial period. Beyond the linguistic aspect, the concept has also been proposed as an alternative to the restrictions of previous projects of traditional, Indigenous philosophy, and ethnophilosophy. Contemporary Afrophone philosophies are profoundly inspired by the more mature development of written Afrophone literatures, as exemplified by Ngugi wa Thiong'o.

Studies of philosophical ideas in African languages have been focused on languages such as Swahili, Lingala, Shona, Ndebele, Bambara and Yoruba, among others.
