= Didier Kaphagawani =

Malawian philosopher

- Died: July 28, 2000

Philosophical work
- Region: African philosophy
- Institutions: University of Malawi
- Language: English, Chewa.
- Main interests: Epistemology; Metaphysics; Ethics

Didier Njirayamanda Kaphagawani or Didier Kaphagawani was a Malawian philosopher. He is known for his ideas on African philosophy. This included ideas on African epistemology and African understandings of personhood.

Didier Kaphagawani was Professor of Philosophy and Vice-Principal of Chancellor College at the University of Malawi.

In according of Malawian philosopher Grivas M. Kayange: "Another significant figure in the late 1990s was Didier Kaphagawani, who in his various works used language analysis in his presentation of African thought. For instance, he attempted to collect and analyze the Chichewa proverbs in the areas of Malawi, Zambia, and Mozambique. He helped clarify components of individualism and communitarianism in these areas of African thought."

== Works ==
=== Book ===
- Leibniz on Freedom and Determinism in Relation to Aquinas and Molina.

=== Articles and chapters of books ===
- “African Conceptions of Personhood and Intellectual Identities” in Philosophy from Africa: A Text with Readings, ed. P.H. Coetzee, A.P.J. Roux (New York: International Thomson Publishing, 1998.
- “Peace and violence in contemporary Africa: A possibility of intercultural dialogue?”. Journal of Humanities, Zomba, v. 14, n. 1, 2000.
