= Authenticity =

Authenticity or authentic may refer to:

- Authentication, the act of confirming the truth of an attribute

== Arts and entertainment ==
- Authenticity in art, ways in which a work of art or an artistic performance may be considered authentic

=== Music ===
- Authentic performance, an approach to the performance of classical music
- Authentic Records, a record label
- Authentic mode, a set of pitch organizations used in Gregorian chant

=== Albums ===
- Authenticity (album), a 2010 album by The Foreign Exchange
- Authentic (LL Cool J album)

== Other uses ==
- Authenticity (philosophy), a particular way of dealing with the external world, being faithful to internal rather than external ideas
- Authentication (law), evidence proven to be genuine
- SS Authenticity, a coastal tanker
- Authenticity Party, an Egyptian political party
- Authentic (show jumping horse), an Olympic show jumper ridden by Beezie Madden
- Authentic (racehorse), winner of the 2020 Kentucky Derby
- Message authentication, in information security
- Authentic Brands Group, American brand management company

== See also ==
- Authenticité (disambiguation)
- Authentic leadership
- Authentic learning
- Counterfeit
- eAuthentication
- Provenance
- Verisimilitude
