= Owiso Odera =

Kenyan actor

- Born: March , 1974; Khartoum, Sudan
- Died: November 3, 2016 (aged 42); Louisville, Kentucky, U.S.
- Education: Earlham College, University of California, San Diego
- Spouse: Nicole Comp

Owiso Odera (March 1974 – November 3, 2016) was a Sudanese-born Kenyan actor. He was perhaps best known for his role as Papa Tunde in the television series The Originals. In 2015, Odera was nominated for a Lucille Lortel Award for Outstanding Lead Actor in a Play for his performance in Katori Hall's play Our Lady of Kibeho at the Signature Theatre.

== Early life and education ==
Odera was born in Khartoum, Sudan to Kenyan mother Millicent Obaso and father Henry Odera Oruka in March 1974.

He attended St. Mary's School, Nairobi, graduating in the class of 1991. Odera earned a scholarship to study computer science at Earlham College in 1992. He graduated from Earlham College in 1996. He also earned a master's degree from the graduate acting program at the University of California, San Diego. He graduated from UCSD in 2005.

== Career ==
On stage he has performed in Katori Hall's Our Lady of Kibeho at the Signature Theatre, Mat Smart's Samuel J. and K. with Justin Long at the Williamstown Theatre Festival, and Jay O. Sanders' Unexplored Interior at the Museum of Jewish Heritage.

He has appeared in the television series The Originals, The Good Wife and Madam Secretary. Other television series he has appeared in include Unforgettable, Three Rivers, FlashForward, Minority Report, NCIS: Los Angeles, The Unit, Numbers, The Millers and Blue Bloods. He also appeared in the series Dirt.

Odera also appeared in the 2007 feature film Relative Obscurity with Larisa Oleynik.

== Personal life and death ==
Odera was married to Nicole Comp. At the time of his death, Odera was residing in Santa Monica, California.

Odera died on November 3, 2016, after collapsing on stage during a rehearsal of Dominique Morisseau's Detroit '67 at the Galt House in Louisville, Kentucky. He was 42. His family did not reveal the cause of his death.

He is survived by his wife, Nicole, his sisters Sheila and Sharon and his half-brothers Peter and Ronnie.
