= Josephat Obi Oguejiofor =

Nigerian Catholic priest and academic

Josephat Obi Oguejiofor // is a Nigerian professor of Philosophy and Director of the School of General Studies, Nnamdi Azikiwe University, Awka, Nigeria. His areas of interest include African philosophy, medieval philosophy, modern philosophy, metaphysics, analytic philosophy, philosophy of time, and philosophy and governance in Africa. He is an ordained Catholic priest.

== Background ==
Born in Nigeria, Oguejiofor graduated from Bigard Memorial Seminary in philosophy. He studied at the University of London, and has a PhD in philosophy from Catholic University of Louvain, Belgium. He started his lecturing career in 1987 at the Seat of Wisdom Major Seminary, Nigeria. Oguejiofor has been invited to lecture at the Catholic University of Louvain (1992–1994), and at the Institute of African Studies, University of Cologne, Germany (2001–2002). He was ordained a Catholic priest on August 15, 1986, at the Archdiocese of Onitsha, Nigeria.

Oguejiofor is a past president of the Nigerian Philosophical Association, the Catholic Theological Association of Nigeria, and the International Society for African Philosophy and Studies. He was the editor-in-chief of UJAH: Unizik Journal of Arts and Humanities and OGIRISI: a New Journal of African Studies.

== Works ==
Oguejiofor has written and co-written numerous books and journal articles. In 2001, he authored a book, The Philosophical Significance of Immortality in Thomas Aquinas. It was reviewed in The Review of Metaphysics by Leo J. Elders, who wrote, "Much research went into this clear and well-written book and the author shows a good acquaintance with the relevant literature."

Oguejiofor has written on the subject of democracy and governance. In one essay, "Democracy and Social Movements: In Search of the Democratic Ideal", he specified three characteristics necessary for democracy to remain feasible in a given society. He wrote that the society must have a system to change the government, that people must be able to vote and to pursue political goals in such a system, and that citizens must feel connected with that system.
