= Elvis Imafidon =

Elvis Imafidon is a Nigerian scholar of African philosophy.

== Career ==
Born in Nigeria with albinism, Elvis Imafidon graduated from Ambrose Alli University (located in Ekpoma, Edo State), and in 2014 he earned a PhD in Philosophy from the University of Ibadan. Imafidon specialises in African philosophy generally, and has primarily conducted research about ontology, ethics, and epistemology from an African perspective. Imafidon has written several books; he has stated that his experience of living with albinism in Nigeria (which is often highly stigmatised and persecuted) led him to write African Philosophy and the Otherness of Albinism (2018), which according to Ada Agada was the first comprehensive study of albinism from a philosophical perspective.

As of 2026, Imafidon is Head of the School of History, Religion, and Philosophy at SOAS University of London and a research associate of the African Institute for Epistemology and Philosophy of Science at the University of Johannesburg. He also chairs the Centre for Global and Comparative Philosophies at SOAS, and is a fellow of the Johannesburg Institute for Advanced Study (2017) and the British Academy (2024/25).

== Selected works ==
The following are some books and journal articles that Imafidon has authored or edited:

- Imafidon, Elvis (2012). "The Concept of Person in an African Culture and its Implication for Social Order". Lumina. 23 (2) – via SOAS.
- Imafidon, Elvis; Bewaji, John Ayotunde Isola, eds. (2013). Ontologized Ethics: New Essays in African Meta-Ethics. Bloomsbury Publishing. ISBN 978-0-7391-8504-9.
- Imafidon, Elvis, ed. (2015). The Ethics of Subjectivity: Perspectives since the Dawn of Modernity. Palgrave Macmillan. ISBN 978-1-137-47242-7.
- Imafidon, Elvis (2017). "Dealing with the other between the ethical and the moral: albinism on the African continent". Theoretical Medicine and Bioethics. 38 (2). ISSN 1573-1200.
- Imafidon, Elvis (2018). African Philosophy and the Otherness of Albinism: White Skin, Black Race. Routledge. ISBN 9780429443787.
- Imafidon, Elvis, ed. (2020). Handbook of African Philosophy of Difference. Springer. ISBN 978-3-030-14835-5.
- Baker, Charlotte; Imafidon, Elvis, eds. (2022). Cultural Representations of Albinism in Africa: Narratives of Change. Peter Lang AG International Academic Publishers. ISBN 9781800791404.
- Imafidon, Elvis; Tshivhase, Mpho; Freter, Björn, eds. (2023). Handbook of African Philosophy. Springer. ISBN 9783031251481.
- Imafidon, Elvis (2026). Doing African Philosophy: Beyond Textuality and Individual Authorship. Bloomsbury Academic. ISBN 978-1-350-46427-8.
