= Kocc Barma Fall =

15th century Senegambian philosopher

Birima Maxuréja Demba Xolé Faal (Kocc Barma Fall)
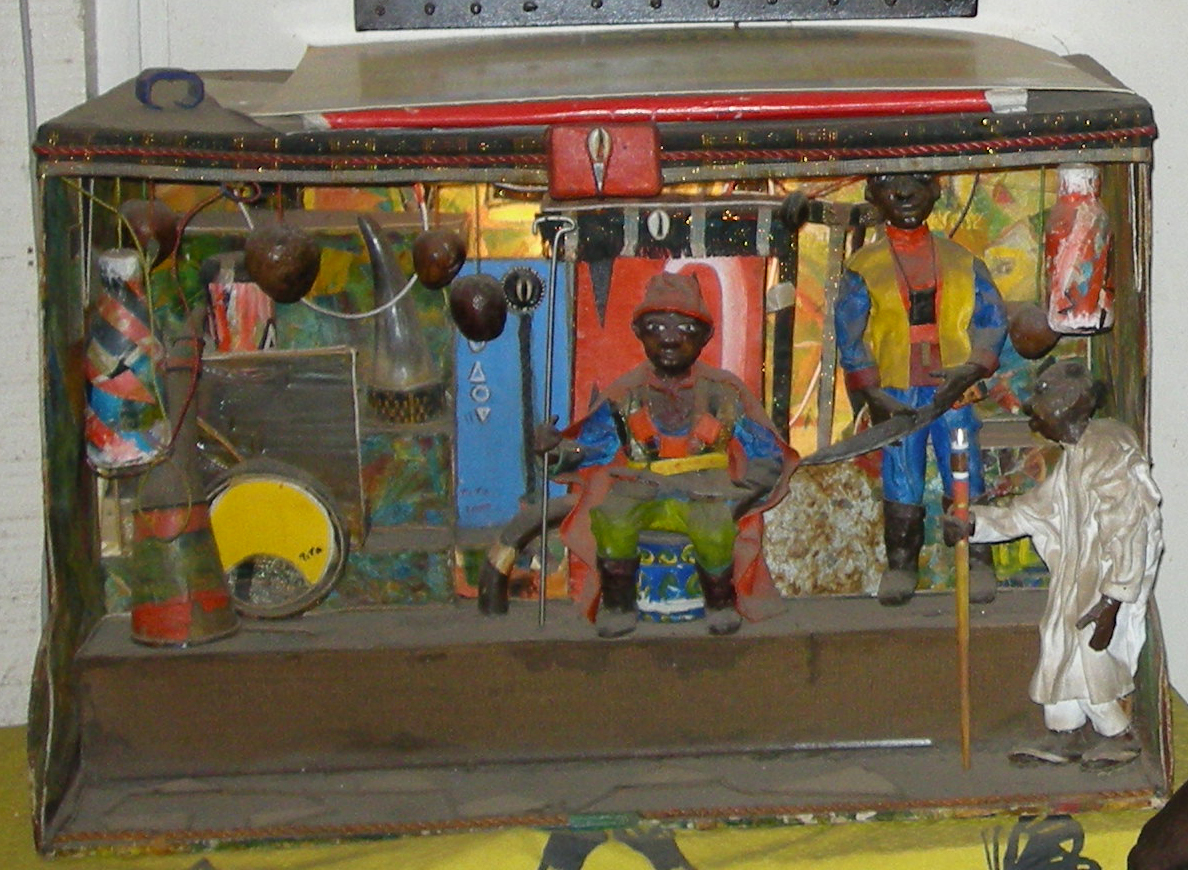
- "Théâtre en boîte" by the Senegalese artist Amadou Makhtar Mbaye. Depiction of philosopher Kocc Barma Fall's (right) visit to the Damel of Cayor
- Born: 1586; Ndiongué Fall
- Died: 1655 (aged 68–69); Ndiongué Fall
- Parents: Makhourédia Fall Demba Khoulé (father); Nguéné Khéwé (mother)

Philosophical work
- Region: African philosophy
- Main interests: ethics, politics and society

Kocc Barma Fall or Kotch Barma Fall, more commonly known as Kocc Barma, born Birima Maxuréja Demba Xolé Faal (1586–1655) was a Cayorian philosopher and the Lamane of Diamatyl.

He is considered to be the greatest Senegalese thinker and philosopher, and one of the prominent figures of African philosophy. His fertile imagination, his quick wit and his metaphorical sayings are part of the universe of Wolof culture. During his lifetime, he was particularly concerned about the injustice of damels, whom he viewed as tyrannical.

== Life ==
Birima Maxuréja Demba Xolé Faal was born c. 1584 in the village of Ndiongué Fall, in what is now the Ndande Arrondissement of Senegal. He was a precocious and intelligent child.

In 1640 Ndaw Demba Fall became Damel of Cayor, and quickly alienated the free population of the kingdom and the Lamanes, traditional chieftains, with authoritarian and arbitrary dictates. As Lamane of Diamatyl, Kocc Barma was one of the most prominent members of the traditional aristocracy, and so took a lead role in resisting increasing centralization of power by the king.

Unable to simply arrest so powerful an adversary, Ndaw Demba attempted to frame Kocc Barma for a crime, but failed. He then sent the jaami-buur, the royal slave warriors, to raid Diamatyl. Kocc Barma, forewarned, took refuge with the Jawrigne Mboul, another important aristocrat. When his soldiers failed to bring back the Lamane, Ndaw Demba had the head of the jaami-buur executed. This allowed Kocc Barma to form a political coalition against the Damel, who was peacefully deposed during the feast of Tabaski 1647.

Fall died in his native village c. 1654 or 1665.

== Philosophy ==
Kocc Barma's philosophy, enshrined in thousands of sayings and proverbs, argues for the moderation of political power and promotes the value of age and wisdom. Adapting a rationalist approach and eschewing any overt religious themes, he sees questioning and interrogation as the foundation of understanding.

== In popular culture ==
In Ousmane Sembène's film Guelwaar, the actor playing the role of Guelwaar recited one of Kocc Barma's proverbs in the film. In addressing the crowd celebrating the food aid they've been given by white people in the presence of the European delegation and the country's political elite, Guelwaar took to the stage voicing his repulsion and shame of what he had witnessed before his very eyes, and reminded the crowd of the values of true African dignity and honour. In expressing his repulsion of the African leaders begging European powers for aid, and the humiliation and indignity thereof, he said:

"Our ancestor Kocc Barma said:"
"If you want to kill a proud man, give him what he needs to live everyday. In the long run, you've made him a serf."

Following that speech, the crowd refused to accept the food aid, to the dismay of the country's political elite and the Western delegation on the stage.

David Murphy states that "Kocc Barma's words and acts have passed into Senegalese folklore to such an extent that proverbs are often introduced by the phrase 'Kocc Barma said', whether this is true or not".

His tomb was rebuilt into a mauseoleum in 2007 by the Senegalese Ministry of Culture.

== More links ==
- History of Senegal

== Biography ==
- Boulegue, Jean (2013). Les royaumes wolof dans l'espace sénégambien (XIIIe-XVIIIe siècle) (in French). Paris: Karthala Editions.
- Diagne, Léon Sobel, « Le problème de la philosophie africaine » (2004), p. 10 (archived by French Wikipedia)
- Murphy, David, Sembene: Imagining Alternatives in Film & Fiction. James Currey Publishers (2000), p. 63. ISBN 9780852555552
- Ware, Rudolph T., The Walking Qurʼan: Islamic Education, Embodied Knowledge, and History in West Africa, UNC Press Books (2014), p. 101, ISBN 9781469614311 (retrieved 18 Jan 2019)
