= Mogobe Ramose =

South African philosopher

Mogobe Bernard Ramose is a South African philosopher, one of the key thinkers to have popularised African philosophy, and specifically Ubuntu philosophy, internationally. Ramose is Professor of Philosophy at the University of South Africa in Pretoria.

== Biography ==
Mogobe Ramose received his PhD in Philosophy from the Katholieke Universiteit Leuven in Belgium in 1983. His time in Belgium was spent as a political refugee, having been exiled from South Africa during the regime of Apartheid. He returned to South Africa in 1996, to take up a research position at the University of Venda.

== Notable works ==
In his essay 'The struggle for reason in Africa,' published in 1998, Ramose argued for the importance of opening up Western philosophy to the range of philosophical traditions originating outside of Europe. Another notable work is African Philosophy through Ubuntu, published in 1999. The book outlines how concepts such as justice and law can be understood through Ubuntu philosophy, and demonstrates how colonization and racism negate the shared humanity of coloniser and colonised. In 2013 Ramose edited a collection of essays entitled Hegel's Twilight, which contrasts Hegel's view of Africa as a dark continent outside of history, to the intercultural philosophy of Heinz Kimmerle.

== Influence and reception ==
Mogobe Ramose's work has been influenced by the political thinking of South African dissident and founder of the Pan Africanist Congress Robert Sobukwe. Ramose has contributed to pan-Africanist thinking and activism, popularised African philosophy, and repeatedly critiqued the persisting view that rationality is the exclusive purview of Western philosophy. He has supervised and influenced a number of students including Masilo Lepuru, Joel Modiri and Ndumiso Dladla.
