= Authenticité =

Authenticité may refer to:

- Authenticité (Chad)
- Authenticité (Zaire)
- Authenticity and Modernity Party (Parti Authenticité et Modernité)

== See also ==
- Authenticity (disambiguation)
