= Ilishan-Remo =

Ilisan Remo Ilu Ilisan Remo
- Ilisan Remo shown within Nigeria
- Coordinates: 6°54′00″N 3°43′00″E
- Country: Nigeria
- State: Ogun State
- local government: Ikenne
- district: Irepodun
- Time zone: UTC+1 (WAT)

Ilisan Remo is a town in Irepodun district in Ikenne Local Government Area of Ogun State, South Western Nigeria.

== Geography ==
It is located within the rainforest climatic region of the country. Babcock University is situated there. The Yoruba language, specifically the Ijebu dialect, is spoken in Ilisan Remo but they also have their own dialect very similar to Ijebu called Ede Remo.

== Notables ==
The 6 main ruling families are Iwayi, Ademo, Isherolu, Agagi, Ishoke and Ikoregun.

- Chief Obafemi Awolowo, the national leader of the Unity Party of Nigeria (UPN),
- Professor John Olubi Sodipo, the pioneer vice-chancellor of Ogun State University (now Olabisi Onabanjo University).
- Olofin of Ilisan Remo is the traditional ruler of the kingdom under the Remo confederacy.
- Chief Otun, Osi, Balogun, Iyalode, Apena, Lisa, Odi, Olutun, Odofin, Erelu, Luwajo.
- Know kings includes Oba Onasoga (late; reigned circa 1970s–early 1980s)

A key community leader who advocated for healthcare development, including the 1982 appeal to the Seventh-day Adventist Mission that led to the establishment of Babcock University Teaching Hospital.

- Oba Michael Olaitan Nathaniel Sonuga (Daniyan II) (reigned 2009–present)

Current Olofin, known for promoting community unity and development initiatives like the annual Isanbi Day celebration.
