= Mabogo P. More =

South African philosopher

Mabogo P. More is a South African philosopher working in the area of Black existentialism, including philosophical analysis of the life and work of Steve Biko and the thought of Jean-Paul Sartre.

== Awards ==
In 2015, More was awarded the Frantz Fanon Lifetime Achievement Award by the Caribbean Philosophical Association.

== Books ==
- Biko: Philosophy, Identity and Liberation (2017)
- Looking Through Philosophy in Black: Memoirs (2018)
- Sartre on Contingency: Antiblack Racism and Embodiment (2021)
