= Dionysius of Cyrene =

Stoic philosopher

Dionysius of Cyrene (Ancient Greek: Διονύσιος ὁ Κυρηναῖος), lived c. 150 BC, was a Stoic philosopher and mathematician.

He was a pupil of Diogenes of Babylon and Antipater of Tarsus.

He was famed as a mathematician, and he is probably the Dionysius whose arguments are attacked by Philodemus in his book On Signs (Latin: De Signis), where Dionysius is reported as arguing that the Sun must be very large because it reappears slowly from behind an obstruction.

== Notes ==
Cf. The New von Arnim Project, Dir. Christian Vassallo (University of Turin), https://www.apathes.unito.it/
