= Mohammed Sabila =

Moroccan writer and philosopher (1942–2021)

Mohammed Sabila (Arabic: محمد سبيلا) (born 1942 – died 19 July 2021) was a Moroccan writer and philosopher.

He was the author of several articles and books on politics and culture, and was known for translating some of the works of Martin Heidegger into Arabic.

Sabila was professor of philosophy at the Mohammed V University of Rabat, chief editor of the magazine Madarat and president of the Societé de Philosophie du Maroc.

Sabila died of COVID-19 in Rabat on 19 July 2021, aged 79.

== Bibliography ==
- Human Rights 1990
- Ideology 1993
- Culture and Politics 1995
- Human Rights and Democracy 1999
- Modernity and Postmodernity 2000
- Through Politics, For Politics 2000
- Morocco and Modernity 2000
- Boudani Brahim, 2003, An Annotated Translation of selected chapters from Mohammed Sabila’s بين الأصولية الحداثة
