= Ato Sekyi-Otu =

Ghanaian philosopher

- Born: Daniel Sackey Walker; 1941 (age 84–85); Saltpond, Ghana
- Education: A.B. in Government, PhD in Political Philosophy
- Alma mater: Harvard, University of Toronto
- Occupations: Political philosopher, Emeritus Professor

Ato Sekyi-Otu is a Ghanaian political philosopher. He was born at Saltpond, Ghana, in 1941 and until 1971 was known as Daniel Sackey Walker. He dropped this name for imported beverages to use, and so he could take his father's Fantse name. He was educated at Mfantsipim School, Cape Coast, where he was Head Prefect in 1960-61 and completed his Cambridge Higher School Certificate in 1961 with distinctions in Greek and Latin. He went to Harvard and received an A.B. in Government in 1966. He pursued graduate studies at the University of Toronto where he worked with the renowned Canadian political theorist C.B. Macpherson and received his PhD in political theory in 1971.

Sekyi-Otu taught in the Department of Social Science and the Graduate Program in Social and Political Thought at York University, Toronto, until he retired in 2006 as emeritus Professor. He is best known for his work on Frantz Fanon and Ayi Kwei Armah. In 1996 he wrote an acknowledged classic in the literature on Fanon entitled "Fanon's Dialectic of Experience" published by Harvard University Press. His most recent book is "Left Universalism, Africacentric Essays published by Routledge in 2019, which won the 2019 Caribbean Philosophical Association Frantz Fanon Outstanding Book Award.

== Published works ==
- Fanon's Dialectic of Experience (Cambridge, MA: Harvard University Press, 1996)
- Left Universalism, Africacentric Essays (Routledge, 2019)
- Homestead, Homeland, Home: Critical Reflections (Daraja Press, 2023)
- Author's Response (Journal of the African Literature Association, 2019)
- Form and metaphor in Fanon's critique of racial and colonial domination (University of Toronto Press, 1975)
- Review of Ato Sekyi-Otu: Fanon's Dialectic of Experience (Ethics 108, 1998)
- Fanon and the Possibility of Postcolonial Critical Imagination (Palgrave Macmillan, New York, 2011)
