= Dispute Between a Man and His Ba =

Ancient Egyptian text

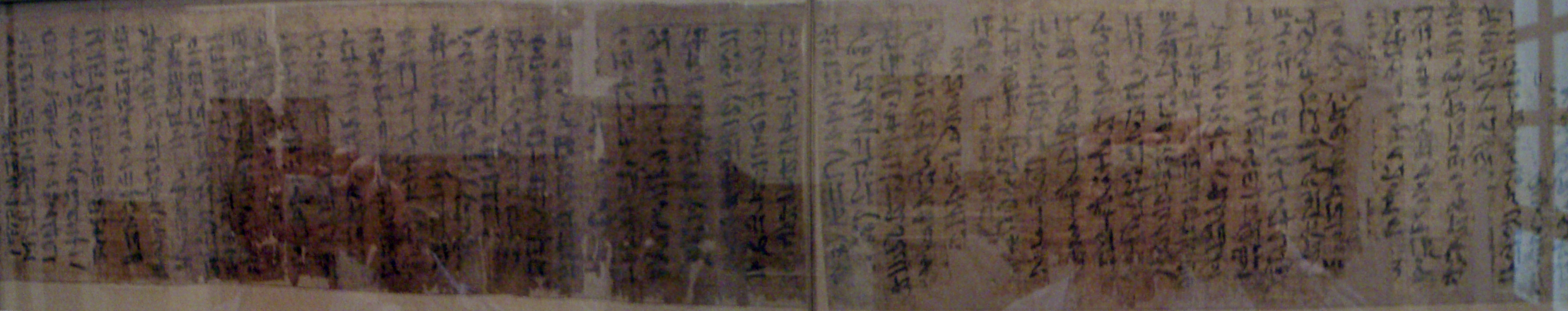
A copy of the ancient Egyptian papyrus "The Dispute Between a Man and His Ba".

The Dispute between a man and his Ba or The Debate Between a Man and his Soul is an ancient Egyptian text probably written during the rule of Amenemhat III in the Middle Kingdom. The composition took place earlier because corrections and misreadings in the existing text show it to be a copy.

The text is considered to fall into the genre of sebayt, a form of ancient Egyptian wisdom literature. The text takes the form of a dialogue between a man struggling to come to terms with the hardship of life, and his ba soul. The text has received significant scholarly attention, and has been translated to English at least 26 times.

The text has survived in four papyrus fragments, containing of 184 columns of hieratic writing. The surviving text is not complete, and it has been estimated to miss ca. 29 columns. Further fragments were published in 2017 including the previously absent beginning of the text.

== The Ba soul ==
An artistic depiction of the Ancient Egyptian concept of the soul

The ancient Egyptian concept of the soul consisted of nine separate parts. Among these is the Ba, which is commonly translated into English as "soul". The Ba soul was thought to represent one's psyche or personality and was thought to live on after one's death, possessing the ability to traverse between the physical and spiritual planes. The ba soul is traditionally depicted in ancient Egyptian art as a human-headed saddle-billed stork.

== Synopsis ==
The text is about an inner struggle of a man attracted by death as a way to get rid of his problems, while also worried how a premature death might affect his afterlife. The surviving part of the text contains three speeches by the man and four by the soul.

In the beginning, the soul advocates for death as a release for hardships of life, to which man responds by complaining that the proper afterlife would be denied from him and his soul by premature death. However, reflecting on the nature of burial and death rituals, they seem less permanent and more futile than before; so, the soul now urges the man to ignore his misery and embrace life instead.

In response the man produces four litanies about social injustice in general, the lack of help from others in particular, attractiveness of death as release from these ills, and the fortunate state of afterlife. The roles are reversed, and in its final last the soul compromises—death should be accepted as the ultimate end of life instead of an immediate solution, so that both the man and the soul can attain proper afterlife together.

== Significance ==
The work has intrigued academics for its place as one of the most significant and introspective early philosophical works. The text has been translated in many different ways, which have led to clashing academic theories on the text's themes and meaning.

The most traditional translation of the work and most widely accepted interpretation is that the text is a commentary on suicide and the Egyptian funerary cult, as the man yearns for the promises of an afterlife in the face of his earthly suffering. In this interpretation, his ba attempts to dissuade the man of taking his life and convince him of the value of life on the mortal plane.

More recent translations and scholarly works have disputed the insinuation of suicide in the text. Many modern interpretations instead view the work as the psychological struggle of a man to come to terms with the sorrow that life brings and accept its innate goodness.

Some scholars believe that the psychological turmoil of the man in this text is a metaphor for the unstable political situation - the text was authored during the 12th Dynasty Egypt following the upheaval of First Intermediate Period.

A common academic theory has been that the dialogue that makes up the text took place before an audience. Recently, with the discovery of new papyrus fragments, this theory has been substantiated as the initial section mentions the presence of a woman named Ankhet, although her role in the work remains somewhat equivocal.

== History ==
The original papyrus copy was bought by the German Egyptologist Karl Richard Lepsius in Egypt in 1843 and is now in the Ägyptisches Museum und Papyrussammlung belonging to the Berlin State Museums.

The first edition was published in 1859, and subsequently numerously translated, with sometimes widely differing interpretation.

This original papyrus manuscript was missing the initial section of the work, beginning in the middle of the man's monologue. In 2017 Papyrus Mallorca II was identified as belonging to Berlin papyrus 3024. This new addition to the text is an introduction of the characters in third person which was common to literature of the time. The introduction identifies the primary speaker of the text as "the sick man". The woman named Ankhet is now thought to be an audience for the debate that followed.
