= Instruction of Any =

Ancient Egyptian text

The Instruction of Any, or Ani, is an Ancient Egyptian text written in the style of wisdom literature which is thought to have been composed in the Eighteenth Dynasty of the New Kingdom, with a surviving manuscript dated from the Twenty-First or Twenty-Second Dynasty. Due to the amount of gaps and corruption it has been considered a difficult, and at times obscure, text to translate.

== Overview ==
The text retains the traditional format of an older man giving advice to a younger man – as the scribe Any, who works in the court of Nefertari, advises his son. However the Instruction of Any is distinguished from earlier works, as its intended audience was the ordinary person rather than the aristocracy. The themes covered by the instructions include respect for religion, motherhood, honesty, restraint and the avoidance of relations with unfaithful women. Unlike other works of instruction, the endings of which tend towards acquiescence and gratitude for the wisdom imparted, this text contains an epilogue in which a son first responds to his father's maxims critically rather than compliantly. The father refutes the son's objections by force of argument.

== Manuscript ==
The most substantial surviving manuscript is contained in the Papyrus Boulaq 4 held in the Cairo Museum, though only small fragments of the first pages remain. Fragments of the text are found in three other papyrus sections in the Musée Guimet, the Papyrus Chester Beatty V held in the British Museum, and in four ostraca from Deir el-Medina.

== Selected passages ==
Quotations are taken from Christian Jacq "The Living Wisdom of Ancient Egypt".

- "Truth is sent by God." (p. 21)
- "Even if he were an important person, a man whose nature is evil does not know how to remain upright." (p. 31)
- "Celebrate the feast of your God and begin it at the correct time. God is unhappy if He is neglected." (p. 44)
- "Be careful to avoid the mistake of lying: it will prevent you from fighting the evil inside yourself." (p. 79)
- "...choose what is good to say and keep evil words prisoner in your body." (p. 79)
- "Keep a loving heart whose words stay hidden. He [God] will provide for your needs. He will listen to what you say, your offering will be acceptable to Him." (p. 80)
- "Everyone can master their own nature if the wisdom which he has been taught has made that nature stable." (p. 85)
- "A lazy man never gets around to doing anything. He who knows how to make plans is worthy of consideration." (p. 90)
- "Do not join a crowd that you meet when it has gathered to fight. Keep away from rebels." (p. 104)
- "Give back in abundance the bread your mother gave you. Support her as she supported you." (p. 106)
- "Pour out the water of libation for your father and mother who rest in the valley of death. The Gods will bear witness to this just act." (p. 106)
- "Scorn the woman who has a bad reputation in your town, do not look at her as she passes. Do not try to sleep with her." (p. 108)
- "Marry a woman when you are young, and let her have children while you are young." (p. 112)
- "All will go well for the man whose household is numerous." (p. 112)
- "Distance yourself from the rebel, do not make a friend of him. Make friends with the just and righteous man whose actions you have observed." (p. 113)
- "Build your own home for yourself and do not assume that your parents house will come to you by right." (p. 113)
- "Do not eat bread without giving some to those near you who do not have anything to eat, since the bread is eternal while man does not last." (p. 123)
- "Do not sit down when there is a person standing who is older than you or whose rank is higher than yours." (p. 123)
- "You will know happiness if your life is lived within the limits set by the will of God." (p. 124)
- "Do not fill your heart with desire for the goods of others, but rather concern yourself with what you have built up yourself." (p. 132)
- "When death comes, it embraces the old like a child in the arms of its mother." (p. 152)
- "Do not lose yourself in the exterior world to the extent that you neglect the place of your eternal rest." (p. 153)
