= Ifeanyi Menkiti =

Nigerian poet (1940–2019)

Ifeanyi Anthony Menkiti
- Menkiti in August 2015
- Born: 24 August 1940
- Died: 17 June 2019 (aged 78)
- Occupations: Poet, philosopher, and professor
- Children: Bo Menkiti

Ifeanyi Anthony Menkiti (24 August 1940 – 17 June 2019) was a Nigerian poet, philosopher, and professor, as well as the owner of the Grolier Poetry Book Shop in Cambridge, Massachusetts.

== Life and career ==
Menkiti was born in Onitsha, Nigeria in 1940. In 1961, he arrived in the United States to study at Pomona College, where he graduated in 1964. Following postgraduate study at Columbia University and New York University, Menkiti earned a PhD in philosophy from Harvard in 1974. His dissertation was "a study of collective responsibility". From 1974 he taught philosophy at Wellesley College in the US with a particular focus on personhood and African philosophy.

Menkiti sought to emphasise the social nature of personhood, expressed in the notion "I am, because we are". In doing so he attempted to build on traditional African ideas of personhood. According to Menkiti, "societies found in traditional Africa routinely accept this fact that personhood is the sort of thing which has to be attained". According to this view of personhood, the status of being a person has ethical connotations and is not something that one possesses automatically but must work towards through morally right action.

In addition to his academic work, Menkiti was a poet. Commenting on the relationship between philosophy and poetry, he said "poetry deals with the meaning of life, the meaning of meaning, just like philosophy".

== Bibliography ==
Menkiti published some highly-cited philosophical works:

"Person and Community in African Traditional Thought," in African Philosophy: An Introduction 3 (1984): 171-182.

"On the Normative Conception of a Person," in Kwasi Wiredu, ed. A Companion to African Philosophy (2005): 324-331.

Menkiti published three collections of poetry:

- Affirmations
- The Jubilation of Falling Bodies
- Of Altair: The Bright Light
