= The Immortality of Writers =

Ancient Egyptian wisdom text

The Immortality of Writers is an Ancient Egyptian wisdom text likely to have been used as an instructional work in schools. It is recorded on the verso side of the Chester Beatty IV papyrus (BM 10684) held in the British Museum. It is notable for its rationalist skeptical outlook, even more emphatic than in the Harper's Songs, regarding an afterlife. The scribe advises that writings of authors provide a more sure immortality than fine tombs. The text is dated to the transition period between the 19th Dynasty and the 20th Dynasty.

...Those writers known from the old days, the times just after the gods. Those who foretold what would happen (and did), whose names will endure for eternity. They disappeared when they finished their lives, and all their kindred forgotten. They did not build pyramids in bronze with gravestones of iron from heaven. They did not think to leave a patrimony made of children who would give their names distinction, rather they formed a progeny by means of writing and in the books of wisdom they left...

They gave themselves [the scroll as lector]-priest, the writing board as loving son. Instruction are their tombs, the reed pen their child, the stone surface their wife..... Man decays, his corpse is dust. All his kin have perished; But a book makes him remembered through the mouth of its reciter. Better is a book than a well built house...

The oratorical style of its writing is evidenced by the metrical structure of the text.
