= Kwasi Wiredu =

Ghanaian philosopher, writer and author (1931–2022)

- Wiredu in 1985
- Born: 3 October 1931; Kumasi, Gold Coast
- Died: 6 January 2022 (aged 90); United States

Education
- Education: University of Ghana, University of Oxford (Bphil)
- Thesis: Knowledge, Truth, and Reason (1960)

Philosophical work
- Era: 20th-century philosophy; 21st-century philosophy
- Region: African philosophy
- School: Plato; David Hume; Kant; Russell; Gilbert Ryle; John Dewey
- Institutions: As faculty member: Ghana; South Florida
- Main interests: African philosophy

Kwasi Wiredu (3 October 1931 – 6 January 2022) was a Ghanaian philosopher. Often called the greatest African philosopher of his generation, his work contributed to the conceptual decolonisation of African thought.

== Life and career ==
Wiredu was born in Kumasi, Gold Coast (present-day Ghana), in 1931, and attended Adisadel College from 1948 to 1952. It was during this period that he discovered philosophy, through Plato (which weaned him from his interest in Practical Psychology) and Bertrand Russell. He gained a place at the University of Ghana, Legon. After graduating in 1958, he went to University College, Oxford to read for the B.Phil.

At Oxford University, Wiredu was taught by Gilbert Ryle (his thesis supervisor), Peter Strawson (his College tutor), and Stuart Hampshire (his special tutor), and wrote a thesis on "Knowledge, Truth, and Reason". Upon graduating in 1960 he was appointed to a teaching post at the University College of North Staffordshire (now the University of Keele), where he stayed for a year. He returned to Ghana, where he accepted a post teaching philosophy for his old university. He remained at the University of Ghana for twenty-three years, during which time he became first Head of Department and then Professor. From 1987 until he retired, he was an Emeritus Professor at the University of South Florida in Tampa.

Wiredu held a number of visiting professorships:

- University of California, Los Angeles, California (1979–1980)
- University of Ibadan, Nigeria (1984)
- University of Richmond, Virginia (1985)
- Carleton College, Minnesota (1986)
- Duke University, North Carolina (1994–1995; 1999–2001)

It was in 1980 that Kwasi Wiredu brought to light the term of conceptual decolonisation in a lecture entitled "Teaching and Research in African Philosophy: Some Suggestions".

He was a member of the Committee of Directors of the International Federation of Philosophical Societies from 1983 to 1998. He was also a fellow at the Woodrow Wilson International Center for Scholars (1985) and the National Humanities Center, North Carolina (1986). He was Vice-President of the Inter-African Council for Philosophy.

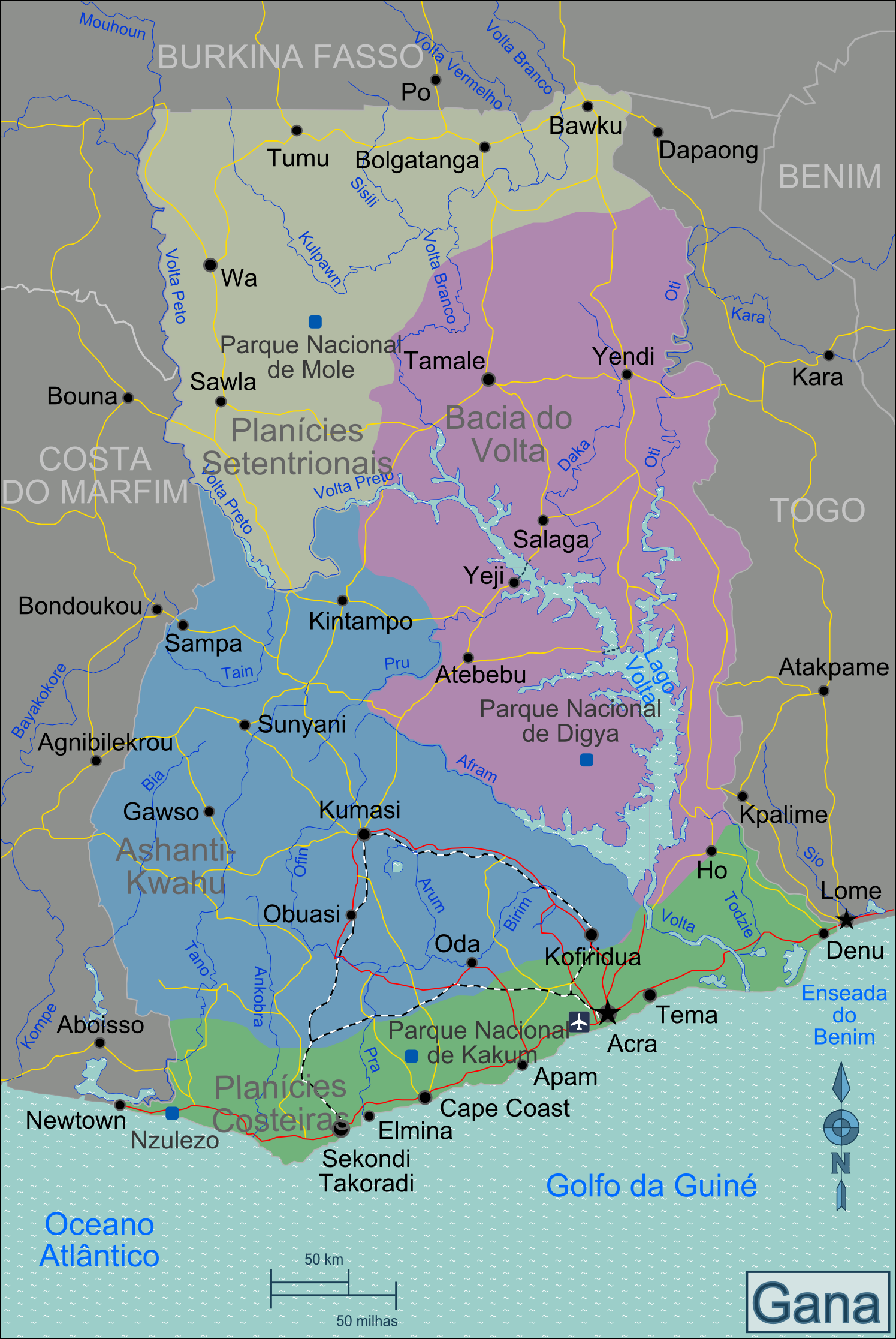
Map of Ghana with regions where Kwasi Wiredu was born

Wiredu died on 6 January 2022 in the United States, at the age of 90.

== Philosophical work ==
One of Wiredu's concerns when defining "African Philosophy" was keeping colonialised African philosophy in a separate category from precolonised Africa. Wiredu (1998) proposes that the African philosopher has a unique opportunity to re-examine many of the assumptions of Western philosophers by subjecting them to an interrogation based on African languages. Let's say hypothetically an African was born and raised in China. Their thoughts and philosophy will be biased to the culture of the language. Not only will they naturally philosophise in that language, but also shape their life around that language.

Wiredu opposed the "ethnophilosophical" and "philosophical sagacity" approaches to African philosophy, arguing that all cultures have their distinctive folk-beliefs and world-views, but that these must be distinguished from the practice of philosophising. It is not that "folk philosophy" cannot play a part in genuine philosophy; on the contrary, he has acknowledged his own debt to his own (Akan) culture's history of thought. Rather, he argues that genuine philosophy demands the application to such thought of critical analysis and rigorous argument.

One of Wiredu's most prominent discussions revolves around the Akan concept of personhood. He believes this traditional framework hosts a two-part conception of a person. First, and most intuitive to Western conceptions of persons, is the ontological dimension. This includes one's biological constitution. Further, Wiredu states that the second dimension, the normative conception of personhood, is based on one's ability to will freely. One's ability to will freely is dependent on one's ethical considerations. One can be said to have free will if one has a high regard to ethical responsibilities. This then designates a person to become a person. One is not born a person but becomes one through events and experiences that lead one to act ethically. This differs from the Western conception of personhood in that people, in traditional Akan thought, are not born as willed beings. Wiredu also is certain that African tradition is not "purely theoretical because he shows how certain aspects of African political thought may be applied to the practical resolution of some of Africa's most pressing problems."

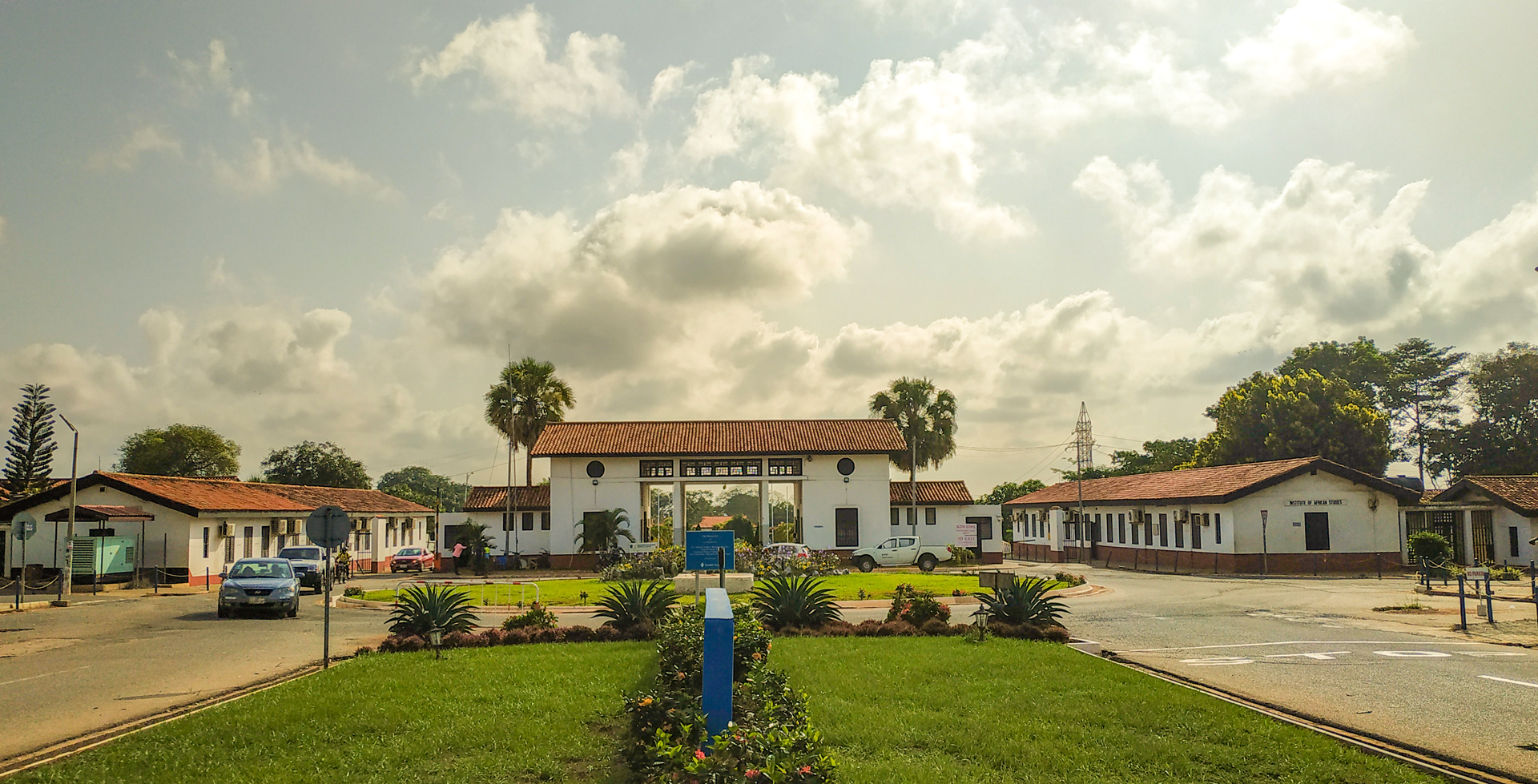
University of Ghana, Legon - one of the schools Wiredu attended

His influences include, apart from his tutors at Oxford, David Hume, Immanuel Kant, the pragmatist John Dewey, and the epistemological, metaphysical, and ethical resources of the Akan culture. The result is philosophy that is at once universally relevant and essentially African.

Wiredu, in his work, enlightened many people on the philosophy and religion of Africa. Not only did he summarise and outline their beliefs in many of his works but he also challenged outsiders predispositions to African beliefs. He wished to shed light and understanding to their belief systems and what they believe to be true and physical. He expressed his thoughts and ideas in The Routledge Companion to Philosophy of Religion on African Religions.

== Bibliography ==
=== Books ===
- Philosophy and an African Culture (Cambridge: Cambridge University Press, 1980). ISBN 0-521-22794-1
  (this won him the 1982 Ghana National Book Award)
- Cultural Universals and Particulars: An African Perspective (Bloomington: Indiana University Press, 1996). ISBN 0-253-21080-1
- Person and Community: Ghanaian Philosophical Studies [Ed] Wiredu & Kwame Gyekye (New York: Council for Research in Values and Philosophy, 1992). ISBN 1-56518-004-6
- A Companion to African Philosophy (Oxford: Blackwell, 2003). ISBN 0-631-20751-1

=== Articles ===
- Wiredu, Kwasi (1998). "Toward Decolonizing African Philosophy and Religion" (PDF). African Studies Quarterly. 1 (4): 17–46. Archived from the original (PDF) on 3 March 2022.
- Wiredu, Kwasi (2000). "Democracy and Consensus in African Traditional Politics. A Plea for a Non-party Polity". them.polylog.org. Polylog. Forum for Intercultural Philosophy. polylog. Zeitschrift für interkulturelles Philosophieren.
- Wiredu, Kwasi (Spring 2009). "An Oral Philosophy of Personhood: Comments on Philosophy and Orality". Research in African Literatures. 40 (1): 8–18. doi:10.2979/RAL.2009.40.1.8. JSTOR 30131182. S2CID 170858179.

== Secondary literature ==
- Futter, D.B. Wiredu on Conceptual Decolonisation. Theoria, issue 175, vol. 70, no. 2, 2023, p. 24-41. doi:10.3167/th.2023.7017503
- Oladipo, O. Philosophy and the African Experience: The Contributions of Kwasi Wiredu. Ibadan: Hope Publications, 1996.
- Osha, S. Kwasi Wiredu and Beyond: The Text, Writing and Thought in Africa. Dakar: Codesria, 2005.
- Hallen, B. Kwasi Wiredu and Beyond: The Text, Writing and Thought in Africa. African Studies Review, vol. 49, no. 3, 2006, p. 175-176.
- Molefe, M. A critique of Kwasi Wiredu’s humanism and impartiality. Acta Academica, vol. 48, no. 1, 2016, p. 91-110.
- Hallen, B. Reading Wiredu. Bloomington: Indiana University Press, 2021.

== See also ==
- Africana philosophy

== Sources ==
- "Faculty. Kwasi Wiredu, Distinguished University Professor Emeritus". philosophy.usf.edu. University of South Florida. 2020. Archived from the original on 29 January 2020.
- King, Peter J. (2013). One Hundred Philosophers : A Guide to the World's Greatest Thinkers. New York, NY: Chartwell Books. ISBN 9780785830221. OCLC 824532348.
