= Paulin J. Hountondji =

Beninese philosopher (1942–2024)

Paulin Hountondji
- Born: Paulin Jidenu Hountondji; 11 April 1942; Abidjan, Colony of Côte d'Ivoire, French West Africa
- Died: 2 February 2024 (aged 81); Cotonou, Benin

Paulin Jidenu Hountondji (11 April 1942 – 2 February 2024) was a Beninese philosopher, politician and academic considered one of the most important figures in the history of African philosophy. From the 1970s onwards, he taught at the Université Nationale du Bénin in Cotonou, where he was Professor of Philosophy. In the early 1990s he briefly served as Minister of Education and Minister for Culture and Communications in the Government of Benin.

== Education and career ==
Paulin J. Hountondji was educated at the École Normale Supérieure, Paris, graduating in 1966, and taking his doctorate in 1970 (his thesis was on Edmund Husserl). After two years teaching in Besançon (France), Kinshasa and Lubumbashi (Democratic Republic of the Congo), he accepted a post at the Université Nationale du Bénin in Cotonou, where he long taught as Professor of Philosophy.

His academic career was interrupted, however, by a period spent in politics. Having been a prominent critic of the military dictatorship that had ruled his country, Hountondji became involved in Benin's return to democracy (in 1992), and served in the government as Minister of Education and Minister for Culture and Communications until his resignation and return to the University in 1994.

Hountondji was until his death director of the African Centre for Advanced Studies in Porto-Novo, Benin, and served as the Bingham Professor of Humanities from 1 August 2008 to 31 December 2008 at the University of Louisville in Louisville, Kentucky.

In 1999, Hountondji was honoured with a Prince Claus Award from the Prince Claus Fund, an international culture and development organisation based in Amsterdam.

== Philosophical work ==
Hountondji's philosophical influences include two of his teachers in Paris, Louis Althusser and Jacques Derrida. His reputation rests primarily on his critical work concerning the nature of African philosophy. His main target was the ethnophilosophy of writers such as Placide Tempels and Alexis Kagame. He argued that such an approach confuses the methods of anthropology with those of philosophy, producing "a hybrid discipline without a recognizable status in the world of theory" ([1997], p. 52). Part of the problem stems from the fact that ethnophilosophy is in large part a response to Western views of African thought; this polemical role works against its philosophical validity.

His approach widened somewhat in later work; he still rejected ethnophilosophy as a genuine philosophical discipline, but he had moved towards more of a synthesis of traditional African thought and rigorous philosophical method. He defended that thesis until his last days.

== Death ==
Hountondji died in Cotonou on 2 February 2024, at the age of 81.

== Bibliography ==
- Hountondji, Paulin J. (1973). "True and False Pluralism", in Olaniyan, Tejumola; Quayson, Ato, eds. (2007). African Literature: An Anthology of Criticism and Theory. Oxford: Blackwell. ISBN 9781405112000. OCLC 137209589.
- Hountondji, Paulin J. (1976). Sur la "philosophie Africaine" : critique de l'ethnophilosophie, Paris: Maspéro, 1976. Featured on the list of Africa's 100 Best Books of the 20th Century.
  - published in English (transl. H. Evans & J. Rée) as African Philosophy: Myth and Reality, Bloomington, Indiana: Indiana University Press, 1983.
  - second edition of the English version with an introduction by Abiola Irele, 1996. "African Philosophy: Myth and Reality. Second edition". archive.org. Internet Archive. 1996.
- Hountondji, Paulin J. (1985). "The Master's voice: remarks on the problem of human rights in Africa". Philosophical Foundations of Human Rights: 319–332.
- Hountondji, Paulin J. (1987). "What can philosophy do?" (PDF). Quest. Philosophical Discussions. An International African Journal of Philosophy. 1 (2): 2–29.
- Hountondji, Paulin J., ed. (1994). Les savoirs endogènes : pistes pour une recherche (in French). [Dakar]: Codesria. ISBN 9782869780392. OCLC 42736719.
- Hountondji, Paulin J. (1997). Combats pour le Sens: Un Itineraire Africain (in French). Cotonou: Flamboyants. ISBN 9789956790265.
- Hountondji, Paulin J., ed. (1997). Endogenous Knowledge: research trails. Dakar: Codesria. ISBN 9782869780408. OCLC 40340094.
- Hountondji, Paulin J. (2000). "Tradition, Hindrance, or Inspiration?" (PDF). Quest. Philosophical Discussions. An International African Journal of Philosophy. XIV (1–2): 5–11.
- Hountondji, Paulin J.; Dossou ép. Houessou, Abelle, eds. (2000). Economie et société au Bénin : d'hier à demain (in French). Paris: Harmattan. ISBN 9782738493880. OCLC 45890156.
- Hountondji, Paulin J.; Conteh-Morgan, John (2002). The Struggle for Meaning: Reflections on Philosophy, Culture and Democracy in Africa. Athens: Ohio University Press. ISBN 9780896802254. OCLC 899031297.

== Secondary literature ==
- Abiola Irele, Francis (2001). "5. Hountondji". In Arrington, Robert L. (ed.). A Companion to the Philosophers. Oxford: Blackwell. ISBN 0-631-22967-1.
- Dübgen, Franziska; Skupien, Stefan (2019). "The Debate on Ethnophilosophy Between Hountondji and His Contemporary Critics". Paulin Hountondji. African Philosophy as Critical Universalism. Global Political Thinkers. Cham: Palgrave Macmillan / Springer. pp. 13–45. doi:10.1007/978-3-030-01995-2. ISBN 978-3-030-01995-2. OCLC 1051670233.
- Serequeberhan, Tsenay (1994). The Hermeneutics of African Philosophy. New York: Routledge. ISBN 9780415908016. OCLC 29312408.

== See also ==
- African philosophy
- Jacques Derrida
- Louis Althusser
- List of African writers
- List of Beninese writers
