= Ethnophilosophy =

Study of indigenous philosophies

Ethnophilosophy is the study of indigenous philosophical systems. The implicit concept is that a specific culture can have a philosophy that is not applicable and accessible to all peoples and cultures in the world; however, this concept is disputed by traditional philosophers. It has been criticised as an aspect of ethnology, rather than philosophy which is undertaken by the individual.
