= Ptahhotep (name) =

Ptahhotep in hieroglyphs
p t H Htp t p A1
ptḥ-ḥtp
Ptah is pleased

Ptahhotep is an ancient Egyptian theophoric name. Notable bearers were:

- Ptahhotep, vizier of the 5th Dynasty, and purported author of The Maxims of Ptahhotep;
- Ptahhotep Desher, vizier of the 5th Dynasty;
- Ptahhotep (Djedkare) vizier of the 5th Dynasty, perhaps brother of the above;
- Ptahhotep Tjefi, vizier of the 5th Dynasty, grandson of Ptahhotep.
