= Moral literature =

Moral literature is a type of writing that focuses on ethical values, moral principles and questions of right and wrong with the purpose of shaping behaviour. It encompasses a variety of genres, such as wisdom literature, fables, proverbs, parables, apologues, exempla, morality plays, courtesy books, cautionary tales, and conduct books.

== Definition ==
Professor Leland Ryken defines moral literature as "literature that offers moral behavior for the reader’s approval or that influences a reader to behave in a moral way".

Professor Robert C. Evans defines it as "literature that helped people to distinguish right from wrong and encourage them to choose virtue over vice".

Robert McAfee Brown states that is difficult to think of any kind of literature that does not have some kind of moral intention behind it, but some narratives have an explicit moral intent.

Moral literature should not be confused with literature that treats morality as a subject matter, such as treatises on moral philosophy, although the two influence each other.

== History ==
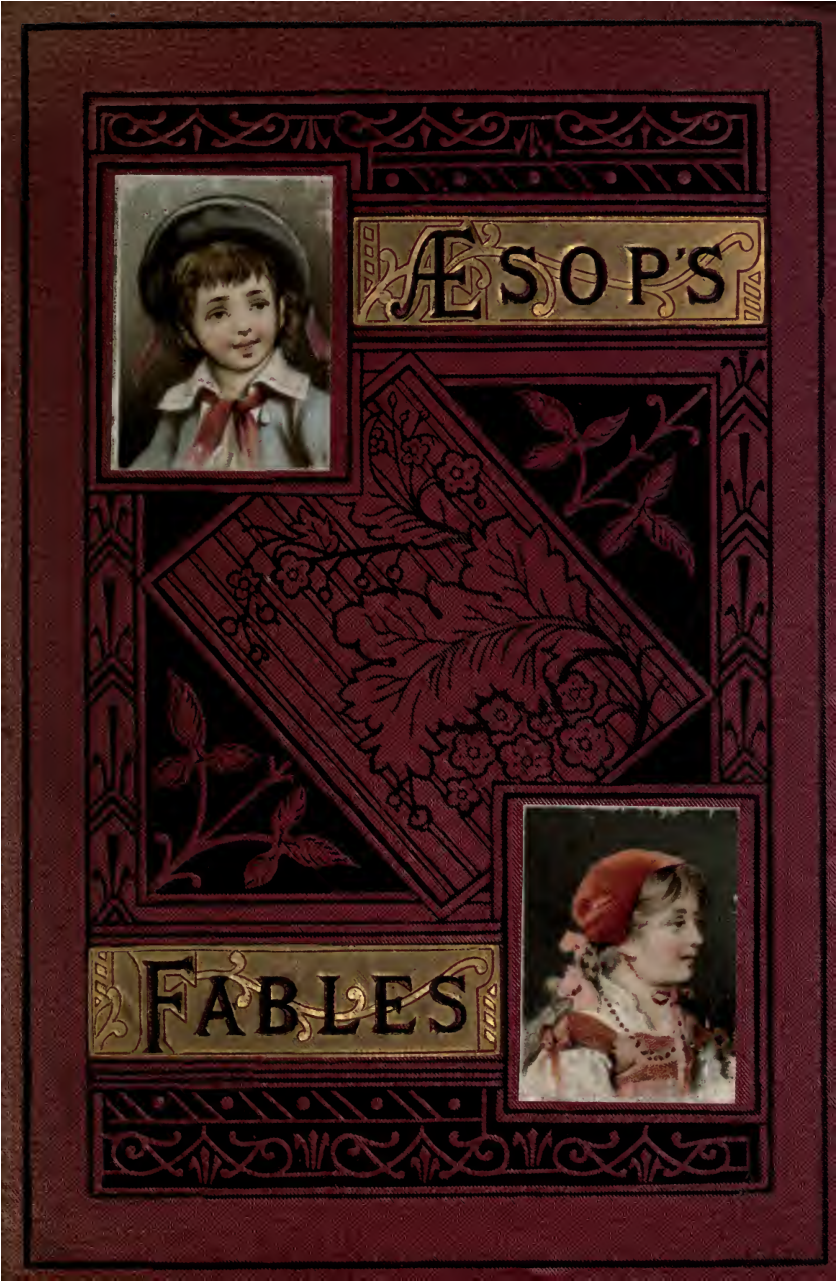
Cover of Three Hundred Æsop's Fables by George Fyler Townsend, illustrated by Harrison Weir. Aesop's Fables is one of the most reprinted moral texts in human history.

Moral literature has ancient roots, and it is among the oldest known literature. The earliest examples come from Mesopotamian and Egyptian wisdom literature dating to the middle of the 3rd millennium BC. They consisted in maxims taught by sages or scribes regarding the best way of carrying one's life. Some notable examples are the Instructions of Shuruppak, the Counsels of Wisdom and The Maxims of Ptahhotep.

Sumerian proverbs written 1,500 years BC often included animal or insect characters and a moral lesson at the end, aspects that would later characterise fables. Among the earliest and most famous fables we can find Aesop's Fables from Ancient Greece (6th century BC) and the Indian collection Panchatantra (c. 200 BC).

In the religious context, moral literature adopted the form of parables, which are short fictional stories that teach a moral lesson. The Bible contains several parables, such as the Good Samaritan, the Prodigal Son, the Lost Sheep, and the Sower. Around 40 parables are also present in the Quran, and they play an important role in Buddhism, in particular in the Mahayana movement. They can also be found in Sufism, Rabbinic Judaism and Hasidism.

In China, during the late Song dynasty (960–1279), the Analects, a collection of proverbs attributed to Confucius, became one of the central books of Confucianism. Confucius believed that a country's well-being relied on the moral development of its people, starting with those in positions of leadership.

In late medieval Europe, the genre known exemplum had an important role in writing and culture. This genre consisted in short illustrative stories that taught a moral lesson and helped preachers to adorn their sermons. It was inspired by the roman tradition of exempla and the fable.

Fables had a resurgence in the Middle Ages with Planudes' Greek translation of Aesop's Fables, published in Constantinople in 1447. And the genre would reach its zenith in Europe in the 17th century with Jean de la Fontaine, who began by adapting Aesop's Fables and expanded them with consecutive collections.

In Great Britain, children's writers of the 1740s and 1750s experimented with short fictions designed to teach behavioural and ethical lessons. One of the earliest examples was The Christmass-Box, published in 1746 by M. Cooper and M. Boreman. The work was written under the pseudonym "Mary Homebred", which was used by the novelist Mary Collyer.

By the end of the century, these stories were known as "moral tales", and became longer and more elaborate. Writers like Maria Edgeworth introduced complex characters in situations where there was not necessarily a clear moral path. Moral tales usually taught values such as hard work, thrift, honesty, solicitude for others, politeness, charity, and obedience to parents.

The 18th and 19th centuries saw the proliferation of conduct books. They were usually written for young people, instructed on ethical issues, and served as manuals on behaviour and social norms.

In the early 19th century, the First Great Awakening led to an increase in religious-inspired moral texts, of which the most famous was probably The History of the Fairchild Family, by Mary Martha Sherwood. During the Victorian era, fairy tales were modified to include moral lessons. Charles Dickens complained about this trend in an essay titled "Frauds on the Fairies", published in 1853, arguing that "Fairy tales should be respected".

Moral literature declined in popularity in Western literature during the first half of the twentieth century. In China, the importance of Confucian literature in education and official life also declined during the first half of the 20th century, particularly after the abolition of the imperial examination system in 1905.

=== Current views ===
In his 1978 book On Moral Fiction, novelist John Gardner criticised what he saw as contemporary literature's lack of morality, and argued that morality is the highest purpose of art.

In 1993, William Bennett published The Book of Virtues: A Treasury of Great Moral Stories, an anthology of 370 passages across ten chapters dedicated to a different virtue (self-discipline, compassion, responsibility, friendship, work, courage, perseverance, honesty, loyalty, and faith), drawn from different ancient an modern texts. According to Bennett, he wrote the book at the behest of teachers who complained about the lack of moral education tools.

Research has shown that exposure to moral literature positively affects assimiliation of virtues and enhances ethical reflection. Hakemulder argues that literature can be considered a "moral laboratory", where human conduct and ideas can be studied in a controlled way.

== Notable works ==
- Instructions of Kagemni, by Kagemni I (2613–2589 BC)
- Instruction of Hardjedef, by Hardjedef (between 25th century BC and 24th century BC)
- The Maxims of Ptahhotep, by Ptahhotep (around 2375–2350 BC)
- The Analects, by Confucius. (c. 500-200 BC)
- Aesop's Fables by Aesop. (c. 500 BC)
- The Panchatantra, by Vishnu Sarma (c. 300 BC)
- Epistulae morales ad Lucilium, by Seneca the Younger, (c. 65 AD)
- The Divine Comedy, by Dante Alighieri (1320)
- The Morall Fabillis of Esope the Phrygian (1480s)
- The Pilgrim's Progress, by John Bunyan (1678)
- A Father's Legacy to His Daughters, by John Gregory (1774).
- Moral Tales for Young People, by Maria Edgeworth (1801)
- The Children's Book of Moral Lessons, by Frederick James Gould (1897)
- Charlie and the Chocolate Factory, by Roald Dahl (1964)
- The Book of Virtues: A Treasury of Great Moral Stories, by William Bennett (1993)

== See also ==
- Didacticism
- Character education
- Ethics
- Virtue ethics

== Bibliography ==
- Hakemulder, Jèmeljan (2000). The Moral Laboratory: Experiments examining the effects of reading literature on social perception and moral self-concept. John Benjamins Publishing Company. ISBN 90-272-2223-1.
