= Didactic literature =

Didactic literature is a type of writing that intends to instruct or inform. The term originates from the ancient Greek didaktikós, which means "apt at teaching".

== Definition ==
According to M. H. Abrams, the expression "didactic literature" is applied to works that have the purpose to 1) instruct on a branch of knowledge, or 2) to embody a moral, religious or philosophical doctrine or theme.

In broad terms, didactic literature can encompass reference works (such as dictionaries and encyclopedias), and practical instruction books (such as cookbooks and manuals).

Unlike non-didactic literature, which has the purpose to entertain, didactic literature intends to teach, and the story (aesthetic function) is secondary to the lesson (disciplinary function). Non-didactic literature can present plots that address moral problems, but they are in essence works "of pure imagination".

Didactic literature is sometimes confused with propaganda, but propagandist literature has the distinct purpose of pressing the reader to adopt a particular position with regard to a current social, political, or religious issue.

== History ==
Several ancient thinkers argued that literature should instruct, educate or morally improve readers. In Ars Poetica, Horace states that "A Poet should instruct, or please". In his essay How the Young Man Should Study Poetry, contained in Moralia, Plutarch discusses how poetry should educate and morally guide the young.

In Medieval Europe, the educational and moral intents were combined, as the study of science was spiritualised and moralised. Bestiaries and lapidaries served as encyclopedias, but they also imparted moral lessons and symbolism.

During the Renaissance, some notable works included The Faerie Queene (1590) by Edmund Spenser, and The Pilgrim’s Progress (1678) by John Bunyan. It was usual for the authors to include themselves as characters, to make the moral lessons explicit.

Until the 18th century, all children's literature had the purpose to instruct. A notable author of this period was Maria Edgeworth, who published two collections for children: The Parent’s Assistant (1796) and Moral Tales (1801).

== Genres ==
Instructive purpose

- Dictionary
- Encyclopedia
- Handbook
- Procedures manual
- Textbook
- User guide

Moral purpose

- Allegory
- Bestiary
- Biblical commentaries
- Catechisms
- Conduct books
- Diatribe
- Didactic poetry
- Fable
- Gnomic poetry
- Georgic
- Lullaby
- Meditation
- Mentor book
- Mirrors for princes
- Parable
- Proverb
- Sage writing
- Satire
- Sermon
- Spiritual biographies
- Theological treatise

== Notable works ==
- Instructions of Kagemni, by Kagemni I (2613–2589 BC?)
- Instruction of Hardjedef, by Hardjedef (between 25th century BC and 24th century BC)
- The Maxims of Ptahhotep, by Ptahhotep (around 2375–2350 BC)
- Works and Days, by Hesiod (c. 700 BC)
- Aesop's Fables by Aesop. (c. 500 BC)
- The Art of War, by Sun Tzu. (c. 500-400 BC)
- The Analects, by Confucius. (c. 500-200 BC)
- The Republic by Plato. (c. 375 BC)
- On Horsemanship, by Xenophon (c. 350 BC)
- The Panchatantra, by Vishnu Sarma (c. 300 BC)
- Dhammapada. (c. 300-200 BC)
- Bhagavad Gita (c. 200 BC-200 AD)
- De rerum natura, by Lucretius (c. 50 BC)
- Georgics, by Virgil (c. 30 BC)
- Ars Poetica by Horace (c. 18 BC)
- Ars Amatoria, by Ovid (1 BC)
- Thirukkural, by Thiruvalluvar (between 2nd century BC and 5th century AD)
- Remedia Amoris, by Ovid (AD 1)
- Medicamina Faciei Femineae, by Ovid (between 1 BC and AD 8)
- Astronomica by Marcus Manilius (c. AD 14)
- Epistulae morales ad Lucilium, by Seneca the Younger, (c. 65 AD)
- On the Consolation of Philosophy, by Boethius, (523 AD)
- Cynegetica, by Nemesianus (3rd century AD)
- The Jataka Tales (Buddhist literature, 5th century AD)
- Philosophus Autodidactus by Ibn Tufail (12th century)
- Theologus Autodidactus by Ibn al-Nafis (1270s)
- The Divine Comedy, by Dante Alighieri (1320)
- The Morall Fabillis of Esope the Phrygian (1480s)
- The Puruṣaparīkṣā by Vidyapati
- The Faerie Queene, by Edmund Spencer (1590)
- La Fontaine's Fables (1668 to 1694)
- The Pilgrim's Progress, by John Bunyan (1678)
- Gulliver's Travels, by Jonathan Swift (1726)
- Rasselas, by Samuel Johnson (1759)
- The History of Little Goody Two-Shoes (anonymous, 1765)
- The Adventures of Nicholas Experience, by Ignacy Krasicki (1776)
- Critical and Miscellaneous Essays, by Thomas Carlyle (1838–1839)
- Critical and Historical Essays, by Thomas Babington Macaulay (1843)
- The Water-Babies, by Charles Kingsley (1863)
- Fors Clavigera, by John Ruskin (1871–1884)
- If-, by Rudyard Kipling (1910)
- Siddhartha, by Hermann Hesse (1922)
- Sophie's World, by Jostein Gaarder (1991)
