= Sebayt =

Egyptian wisdom literature

Sebayt in hieroglyphs
s b sbA A i i t Y1 Z2ss
sbꜣyt

Sebayt (Egyptian sbꜣyt, Coptic ⲥⲃⲱ "instruction, teaching") is the ancient Egyptian term for a genre of pharaonic literature. sbꜣyt literally means "teachings" or "instructions" and refers to formally written ethical teachings focused on the "way of living truly". Sebayt is considered an Egyptian form of wisdom literature.

== Examples ==
In Eulogy of Dead Writers, written during the Twentieth Dynasty of the New Kingdom, a stanza lists the names of writers famous for their great works, most of whom are authors of noted sebayt from the Middle Kingdom:

Is there anyone here like Hordedef?

Is there another like Imhotep?
There is no family born for us like Neferty,
and Khety their leader.
Let me remind you of the name of Ptahemdjehuty
Khakheperraseneb.
Is there another like Ptahhotep?

Kaires too?

Each of these authors (excepting Imhotep, none of whose works survive) including Ptahemdjehuty, can be attested as authors of various works from the Middle Kingdom. Many of the earliest sebayt claim to have been written in the third millennium BCE, during the Old Kingdom, but it is now generally agreed that they were actually composed later, beginning in the Middle Kingdom (c.1991–1786 BCE). This fictitious attribution to authors of a more distant past was perhaps intended to give the texts greater authority.

Perhaps the best-known sebayt is the one which claims to have been written by Ptahhotep, the vizier to the Fifth Dynasty pharaoh Djedkare Isesi, who ruled from 2388–2356 BCE. Ptahhotep's sebayt is often called The Maxims of Ptahhotep or the Maxims of Good Discourse (the latter being a phrase used as a self-description in the sebayt itself). The teaching appears on the Twelfth Dynasty Prisse Papyrus along with the ending of the Instructions of Kagemni. Another well known sebayt was attributed to the Fourth Dynasty ethicist named Hardjedef. Only a few fragments survive of his Instruction.

Two sebayt are attributed to Egyptian rulers themselves. The first of these is entitled the Teaching for King Merykara, who lived during the troubled First Intermediate Period (2150–2040 BCE). The document claims to be written by Merykara's father, the preceding monarch. However, since Merykara and his father were kings of the unstable periods of the Ninth through Tenth Dynasties, almost nothing else is known of them, and it is quite likely that the text was composed at a later period.

The other royal teaching is the Instructions of Amenemhat. This sebayt was reputedly authored by Amenemhat I, the founder of the Twelfth Dynasty, who ruled from 1991–1962 BCE, but was probably composed after his death. It should be mentioned that Amenemhat I was the first pharaoh to rule after the First Intermediate Period, and thus the instructions of Amenemhat are connected to his attempt to consolidate power typified by the Prophecy of Neferti, as alluded to in the Eulogy. Thus both regnal sebayt are directly connected to the Intermediate Period and its aftermath.

Although not attributed to a pharaoh, the Loyalist Teaching stress the virtues of remaining obedient and respectful to the ruler of Egypt.

Sebayt were a long-lived genre, with new compositions continuously appearing well into the Roman era. Some individual teachings, such as the Teaching of Amenemhat I (written c. 1950 BCE) were continuously copied and transmitted for over 1500 years.

Most Sebayt are preserved on papyrus scrolls that are copies of earlier works. Four important examples of sebayt are preserved in the Prisse Papyrus, two papyrus scrolls in the British Museum, the Insinger Papyrus and the Carnarvon Tablet 1 in Cairo. This genre has much in common with sapiential literature in other cultures, and is for example comparable with the Old Testament Book of Proverbs which has in part been connected to the Instruction of Amenemope.
