= Akhethetep =

Akhethetep or Akhethotep is an ancient-Egyptian male given name.

People with the name include:

- Akhethetep (Louvre mastaba), possibly at the end of the 5th Dynasty or beginning of the 6th (24th century BC)
- Akhethetep (overseer of the great house), possibly at the end of the 5th Dynasty or beginning of the 6th (24th century BC)
- Akhethetep (scribe), ancient Egyptian oddicial with modest job titles, dating unknown
- Akhethetep (son of Ptahhotep) (fl. around 2400 BC), senior court official during the rule of Pharaoh Djedkare and Unas
- Akhethetep Hemi, senior court official during the reign of Pharaoh Unas at the end of the 5th Dynasty (24th century BC)
