= Cosmetics in ancient Rome =

Cosmetics, first used in ancient Rome for ritual purposes, were part of daily life. Some fashionable cosmetics, such as those imported from Germany, Gaul and China, were so expensive that the Lex Oppia tried to limit their use in 189 BCE. These "designer brands" spawned cheap knock-offs that were sold to poorer women. Working-class women could afford the cheaper varieties, but may not have had the time (or slaves) to apply the makeup as the use of makeup was a time-consuming affair because cosmetics needed to be reapplied several times a day due to weather conditions and poor composition.

Cosmetics were applied in private, usually in a small room where men did not enter. Cosmetae, female slaves that adorned their mistresses, were especially praised for their skills. They would beautify their mistresses with cultus, the Latin word encompassing makeup, perfume and jewelry.

Scent was also an important factor of beauty. Women who smelled good were presumed to be healthy. Due to the stench of many of the ingredients used in cosmetics at the time, women often drenched themselves in copious amounts of perfume.

Christian women tended to avoid cosmetics with the belief that they should praise what God gave them. Some men, especially cross-dressers, did use cosmetics, although it was viewed as effeminate and improper.

All cosmetic ingredients were also used as medicines to treat various ailments. Lead, although known to be poisonous, was still widely used.

== Men's attitudes ==
Roman attitudes towards cosmetics evolved with the expansion of the empire. The assortment of cosmetics available increased as trade borders expanded and the resulting influx of wealth granted women additional slaves and time to spend on beauty. Ideas of beauty from conquered peoples, especially the Greeks and Egyptians, greatly influenced the Roman paradigm of beauty. Unlike their eastern trading partners however, the Romans felt that only the "preservation of beauty" was acceptable and not "unnatural embellishment". Despite exaggerating their makeup to make it appear in the poor lighting of the time, women still wanted to appear natural as a sign of chastity. Artificiality denoted a desire to be seductive, which made men question for whom exactly a woman was trying to appear attractive. In particular, Romans did not like unnatural colors on the eyes and overlined eyes. This was why men generally viewed the use of cosmetics as deceitful and manipulative. Vestal Virgins did not do makeup because they were supposed to look holy and chaste. Postumia, one of the Vestal Virgins, defied this convention and was consequently accused of incestum.

The consensus was that women who used cosmetics in excess were immoral and deceptive and were practicing a form of witchcraft. Juvenal wrote that "a woman buys scents and lotions with adultery in mind" and mocked the need for cosmetics, believing that they were ineffective. Use of perfumes was further looked down upon because they were thought to mask the smell of sex and alcohol. Seneca advised virtuous women to avoid cosmetics, as he believed their use to be a part of the decline of morality in Rome. Stoics were also against the use of cosmetics, as they were opposed to the usage of all man-made luxuries. Although there are no surviving texts written by women expounding the attitude of women towards cosmetics, their widespread use indicates that women accepted and enjoyed these products. Of all the surviving texts mentioning cosmetics (all written by men) Ovid is alone in his approval of their use. Archaeologist and Haaretz columnist Terry Madenholm writes:

“Ovid is one of the few who understood the sexist social system of his time, portraying in his poems the expectations and criticisms women were facing. Where men shaped their identity through public engagements, women were defined through the prism of being wives and mothers. In a society where women had little liberty, makeup was undoubtedly a tool of expression and, perhaps, for some, even a means of voicing their individuality. Women who were using makeup were consciously or unconsciously assuming some control over their lives. They were projecting a self-constructed image that they wished to present to others.”

== Skincare ==
Pure white skin, a demarcation of the aristocracy, was the most important feature of Roman beauty in women. Pale skin gave the impression of a higher social status. It was assumed that if a woman had pale skin, she stayed inside because she could afford slaves that would go outside and do labor she otherwise would have done.

Women would often prepare their faces with beauty masks prior to applying makeup. One recipe called for the application of sweat from sheep's wool (lanolin) to the face before bedtime, emitting a stench often criticized by men. Other ingredients included juice, seeds, horns, excrement, honey, plants, placenta, marrow, vinegar, bile, animal urine, sulfur, vinegar, eggs, myrrh, incense, frankincense, ground oyster shells, onions with poultry fat, white lead, and barley with vetch. Bathing in donkey milk was an expensive treatment that would exfoliate the skin due to its lactic acid component, and was used by wealthy women such as Cleopatra VII and Poppaea Sabina.

After their baths, they would then apply face whitener, such as chalk powder, white marl, crocodile dung and white lead. The Roman recognition that lead was poisonous underscored their point of view on how important white skin was. Other ingredients used in whiteners included beeswax, olive oil, rosewater, saffron, animal fat, tin oxide, starch, rocket (arugula), cucumber, anise, mushrooms, honey, rose leaves, poppies, myrrh, frankincense, almond oil, lily root, water parsnip and eggs. In Ovid's Art of Beauty, he gives a recipe and directions on how to make a face whitener. The Romans disliked wrinkles, freckles, sunspots, skin flakes and blemishes. To soften wrinkles, they used swans’ fat, asses’ milk, gum Arabic and bean-meal. Sores and freckles were treated with the ashes of snails. The Romans pasted soft leather patches of alum directly over blemishes to pretend that they were beauty marks. Criminals and freedmen used these leather patches, which came in both round and crescent shapes, to conceal brand marks.

With the exception of hair on her head, hair was considered to be unattractive on a Roman woman. Consequently, women removed hair by either shaving, plucking, stripping using a resin paste, or scraping with a pumice stone. Older women faced ridicule for their depilation because it was viewed primarily as preparation for sex.

== Rouge ==
Although Romans esteemed pale faces, a light pink on the cheeks was considered to be attractive, signifying good health. Plutarch wrote that too much rouge made a woman look showy, while Martial mocked women, believing that rouge was in danger of melting in the sun. Sources of rouge included Tyrian vermillion, rose and poppy petals, fucus, red chalk, alkanet, and crocodile dung. Red ochre, a more expensive blush, was imported from Belgium and ground against a stone into powder. Despite knowledge that cinnabar and red lead were poisonous, they were both still used extensively. Cheap alternatives included mulberry juice and wine dregs.

== Eye makeup ==
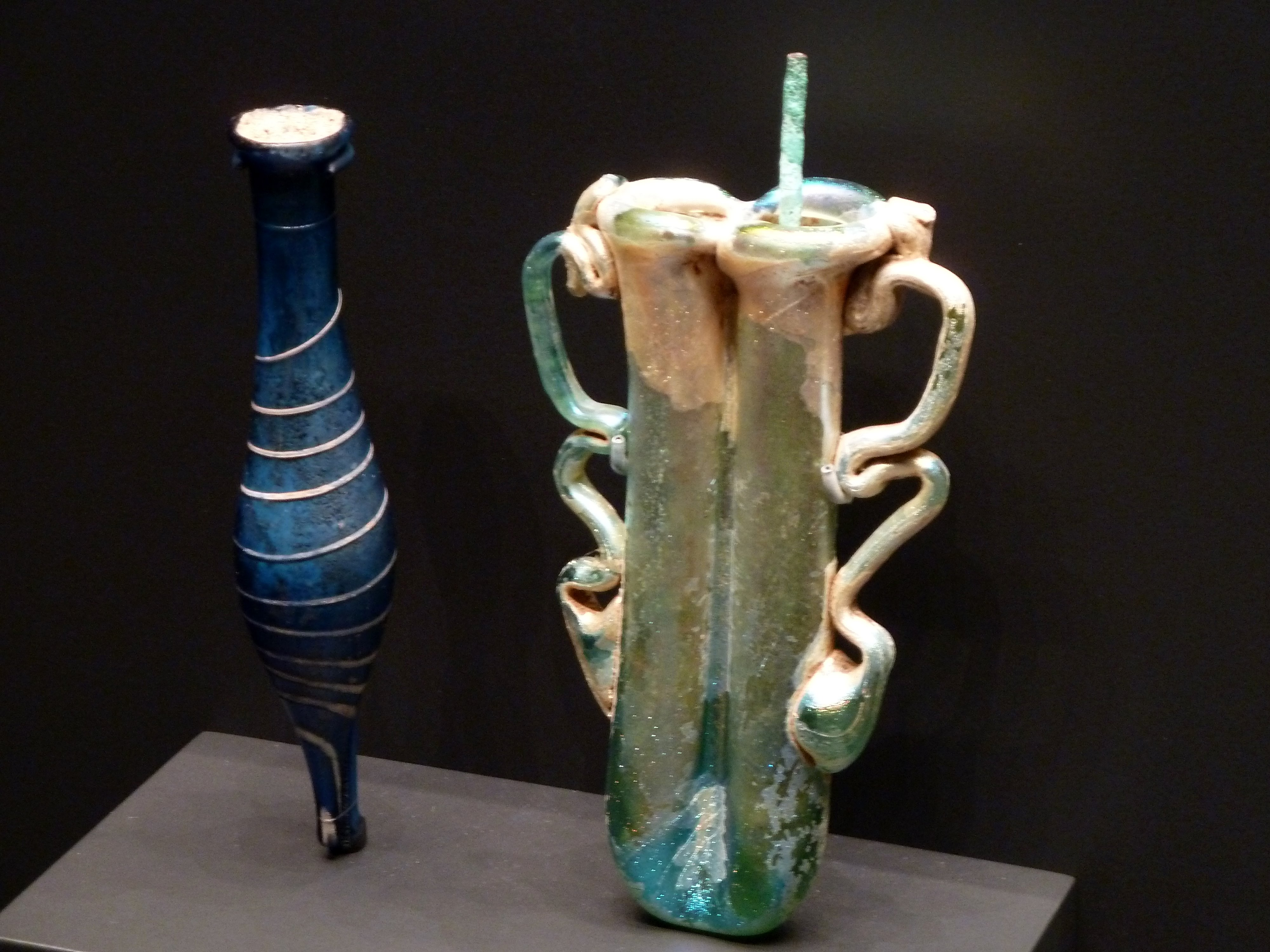
Glass Kohl Container

Roman eye makeup relied on diverse materials and tools, serving not only decorative but also ritualistic and medicinal purposes. Archaeological and scientific findings show that women incorporated these practices into their daily lives, with ingredients and methods differing according to social class, region, and function. Despite the negative connotation against the practice from the literature, makeup was still a part of female identity, a taught behaviour and daily habit.

=== Materials and Application ===
Women commonly included eyeliner and eyebrow darkeners in their everyday grooming practices. These cosmetics often included stibium (kohl), a substance composed of a wide range of ingredients. While the exact function of each component remains unclear, research suggests that kohl served purposes beyond appearance, including medicinal and ritual uses. The term kohl encompassed not only fine powders but also solid forms like sticks, stones, cakes, and pastes derived from those powders. Pliny the Elder documented several recipes and noted that some cosmetics were even sold in tablet form.

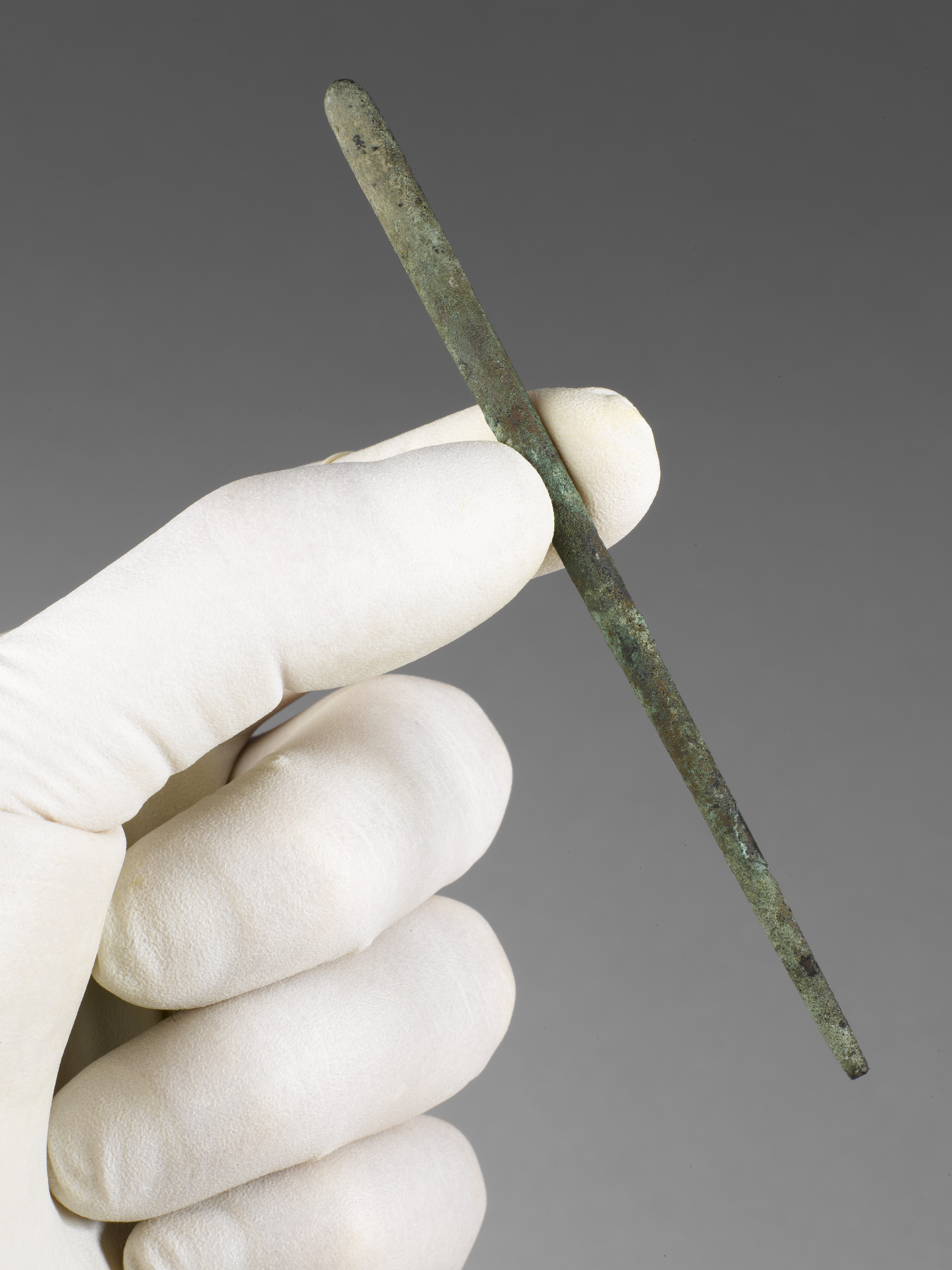
Figure 1. Bronze kohl stick from Egypt (1575–1194 BCE). Wellcome Collection.

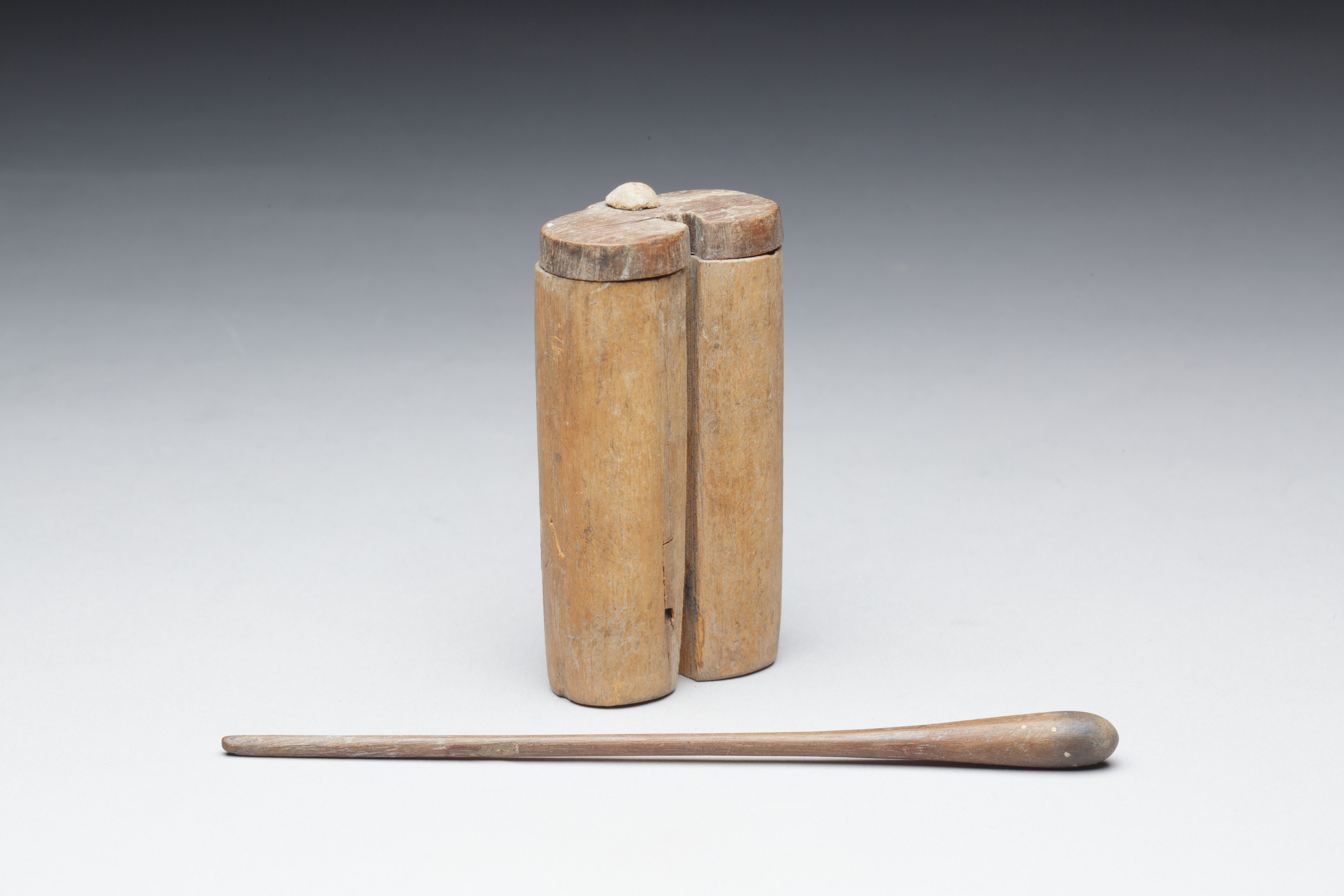
Figure 2. Cylindrical kohl container with chain-attached applicator, Roman Egypt.

Kohl was traditionally applied to the eyelids and eyebrows in powdered form using a slender applicator made from materials such as wood, glass, bone, or ivory (Figure 1, 2). This stick was first moistened with water or perfumed oil, then dipped into the kohl powder. In modern practice, a rod is often swept horizontally across the closed eyelid. The rounded tips found on ancient kohl sticks suggest a comparable technique was used in antiquity. The elongated, narrow design of ancient kohl containers also appears suited to this method of application.

Recent scientific analysis of eleven kohl containers revealed a wide range of chemical compositions, challenging earlier assumptions that kohl followed a standardized formula. One container, a double cosmetic flask from Diospolis Parva Cemetery, was likely used in a burial setting, possibly symbolizing spiritual beliefs or daily practices of the deceased. The study also found that organic materials such as resins, plant extracts, leaves, and seeds were more common in kohl recipes than previously believed, suggesting the substance held aesthetic, medicinal, ritual, and everyday significance. These findings highlight the complexity of kohl preparation, which involved diverse ingredients, specialized vessels, and applicators, practices that continued into Roman Egypt and likely shaped Roman cosmetic traditions.

Cylindrical kohl containers, often with two or more compartments, were designed to hold different pigments, such as black and green. Some included a handle across the top, with a stick suspended from a chain for application. The frequent discovery of such items in graves indicates that they may have served funerary purposes, reflecting Roman customs of burying personal objects alongside the deceased. As Pliny the Elder notes, kohl was believed to protect and purify the eyes, which may explain its symbolic inclusion in burial rites as a marker of health and spiritual clarity

Archaeologists have traditionally identified these vessels, known as unguentaria, as containers for perfumes or cosmetics. A wall painting from a tomb at Morlupo shows them arranged in a glass bowl, possibly as part of a toiletry set. Chemical analysis of some examples confirmed the presence of kohl and oil-based substances, supporting cosmetic use. However, their discovery alongside medical instruments in burial contexts also suggests they may have contained medicinal substances. Given their varied contents, scholars continue to debate their exact use and association with gendered practices.

Calliblepharum appears in several ancient literary sources as an eye cosmetic, possibly made from the ash of rose kernels or date stones, though the descriptions often lack clarity regarding its exact use. Pliny the Elder refers to calliblepharum as a cosmetic substance potentially derived from an asphaltic deposit. Varro also references calliblepharum in a poetic context, noting “eyelashes tinted with natural calliblepharum”, which suggests a darkening effect applied to the eyelids or lashes. These references confirm that the term was known in antiquity, though their ambiguity indicates that even contemporary authors may not have clearly understood whether it was intended for the eyelids or the lashes.

Class distinctions shaped cosmetic choices. Stewart notes that while wealthier women likely preferred expensive minerals such as antimony and galena, lower-class women often used soot, which they could easily collect from oil lamps in brothels. Although less prestigious, soot offered a more accessible alternative. This contrast illustrates how beauty habits adapted to different levels of social status. Ovid also mentions saffron as an eyeliner, a substance frequently associated with elite women for its brightening effect and luxurious value. Women applied it with a thin stick or needle for precision, although archaeological evidence for this practice remains limited.

Stewart argues that Roman use of kohl likely evolved from its earlier symbolic and protective roles in Egyptian ritual practice. She links Roman adaptations like saffron-based eyeliner to the opulence of Egyptian cosmetics, highlighting their connection to wealth and status. Stewart also suggests that Roman women continued using potentially harmful substances because their exotic origins added prestige. However, Olson challenges this view, pointing out the limited textual evidence to support the idea that these ingredients were valued specifically for being foreign.

=== Beauty Ideal ===
Roman beauty ideals prized large, expressive eyes framed by long lashes and darkened eyebrows that nearly met at the bridge of the nose. This wide-eyed, “doe-like” appearance was often realized with cosmetics made from various ingredients. Pliny the Elder observed that Roman women commonly colored their eyelashes and, indeed, “such is their desire to achieve the beauty that they color even their eyes.” He also believed that thick eyelashes signified chastity, claiming that sexual excess made them fall out.

Despite these ideals, male Roman authors, particularly from the upper classes, frequently expressed disdain for the use of cosmetics. Writers active between 50BCE and 200AD often framed makeup as deceptive or immoral. The poet Juvenal mocked women who used extensive beauty products, including “antimony collyria” for the eyes, describing their cosmetic routines as a symptom of excessive luxury and moral decline. Shadi Bartsch notes that the mirror, a common cosmetic tool, was often depicted as a symbol of vanity and emasculation in Roman literature.

Eye makeup also appeared in moralistic and religious discourse. Clement of Alexandria, a Christian philosopher, criticized women who used cosmetics such as soot to darken their eyebrows, referring to them as using “crocodile excrement” and accusing them of vanity and lack of discipline. While soot may have been associated with the lower classes due to its affordability, Clement also condemned the wealthy for spending excessively on luxurious cosmetic containers. Such critiques suggest that condemnation of makeup transcended class boundaries.

Literary sources often warned men against being deceived by women’s artificial beauty and encouraged women to present themselves without adornment. Juvenal also ridiculed men who used stibium and fuligo to enhance their own features, reinforcing the association between cosmetics and vanity.

In contrast to most male authors, Ovid offered a more accepting view of women’s cosmetic use. In Medicamina Faciei Femineae, he wrote, “Let each girl enhance her beauty as best she can: art, too, is a part of beauty,” and endorsed stibium for shading the eyes: “Why should the eyes not be made more sparkling with black antimony? He advised women to avoid being seen during their beauty routine, but ultimately celebrated cosmetics as a source of pleasure. Ovid also recommended filling in sparse eyebrows, while other authors like Petronius described the ideal eyebrow shape as nearly meeting near the nose. Martial and Juvenal referenced false eyebrows and mocked men who followed eyebrow-enhancing trends, again associating cosmetics with effeminacy and excess.

=== Medicinal Function ===
Though satirized in literacy, the pharmacological evidence reveals that the substances in the eye makeup contained antibacterial properties and were part of the daily hygiene practice. Kohl, widely used as eye makeup in ancient civilizations, served a dual function that extended beyond aesthetics. While it was applied to enhance eye size and contour—a feature praised in Roman literature—it also held medicinal value, particularly due to its primary ingredient, galena (lead sulfide). As recent pharmacological studies confirm, galena-based kohl stimulated the production of nitric oxide, which enhances immune response and offers antibacterial protection, including against strains like Staphylococcus aureus. This supports Pliny the Elder’s claim that women used stibium (antimony or galena) in “eye medications” rather than purely for beautification.

Furthermore, the dark pigment of galena absorbed ultraviolet radiation, acting as a protective shield against the sun’s glare in arid climates. As the authors of Toxicology in Antiquity note, kohl’s widespread use was not merely cosmetic but reflected a sophisticated understanding of its biomedical properties: “lead-based eye preparations… were manufactured and used in ancient Egypt to prevent and treat eye illnesses by supporting the immune system.” Thus, what might appear today as ornamental eye makeup was in antiquity a therapeutic product embedded in daily hygiene and health practices.

=== Mummy Portraits ===
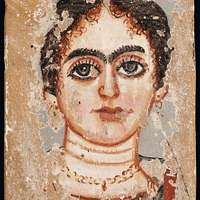
Roman-period Egyptian mummy portrait of a woman, painted on wood, likely from er-Rubayat, dating to the 2nd–3rd century CE.

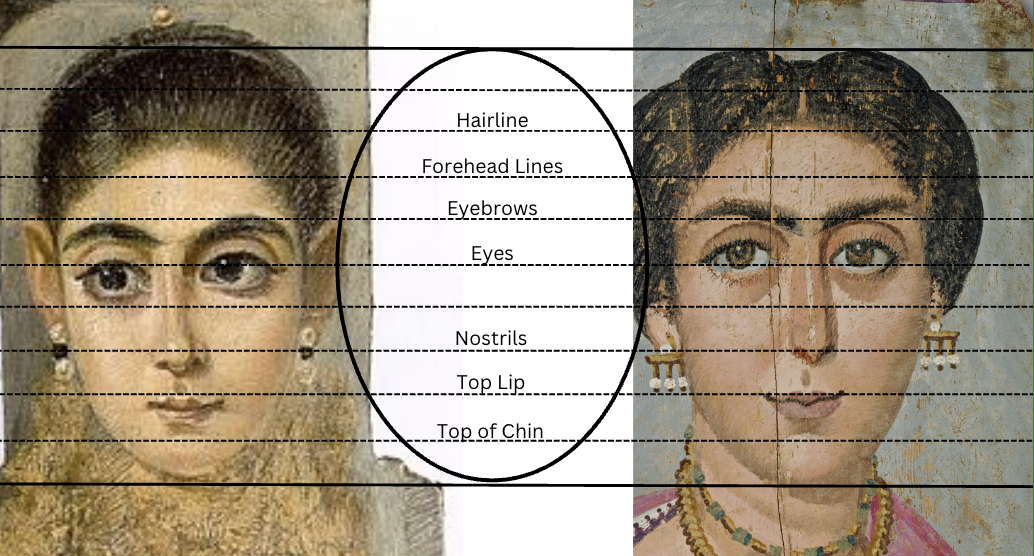
Facial feature alignment in Roman Egyptian mummy portraits. Inspired by A Study of the Relative Locations of Facial Features within Mummy Portraits

Although some scholars mentioned that there are no visual records of women wearing eye makeup, mummy portraits serve as the minor evidence. These portraits often display women with distinctly defined eyes, including prominent eyelashes and eyebrows, reflecting practices mentioned in both literary and archaeological sources. As such, they serve as rare visual evidence of eye makeup use, particularly among women of higher social standing in Roman Egypt.

Artists of mummy portraits frequently employed stylistic conventions that emphasized the eyes. The eyes are often placed higher on the face than in natural proportions and rendered larger than in realistic portraiture, creating a more striking and expressive appearance. This approach aligns with broader Roman visual culture, in which the exaggeration of eye features could signify spiritual presence or elevated social status, rather than mere physical likeness.

Facial features in these portraits were typically arranged along precise horizontal lines to draw further attention to the eyes. Subtle visual cues, such as the depiction of prominent eyeliner and gently curled lashes, support the notion of cosmetic use. These artistic details correspond with Roman literary sources, including Pliny the Elder, who described common beauty practices and ideals such as closely drawn brows or even the suggestion of a unibrow.

=== Eye Shadow ===
Colored eyeshadow was also applied by women to accentuate their eyes. Green eyeshadow came from malachite, while blue came from azurite. Most women wore green eyeshadow as it was more popular.

=== Eyebrows ===
The Romans preferred dark eyebrows that almost met in the center. This effect was achieved by darkening their eyebrows with antimony or soot and then extending them inward. Plucking began in the 1st century BCE to tidy their overall look.

== Lips, nails and teeth ==
Although evidence for the usage of lipstick appears in earlier civilizations, no such evidence has materialized to indicate that the Romans ever colored their lips. The only evidence for painting nails comes from a red dye they imported that was produced from an Indian insect. Generally only the wealthy cut their nails, as they used barbers to clip their nails short, following the contemporary practice for good hygiene.

Although oral hygiene was nowhere near today’s standards, white teeth were prized by the Romans, and so false teeth, made from bone, ivory and paste, were popular items. Ovid shed light on the way white teeth were viewed in society when he wrote the statement, "You can do yourself untold damage when you laugh if your teeth are black, too long or irregular." The Romans also sweetened their breath with powder and baking soda.

== Perfume ==
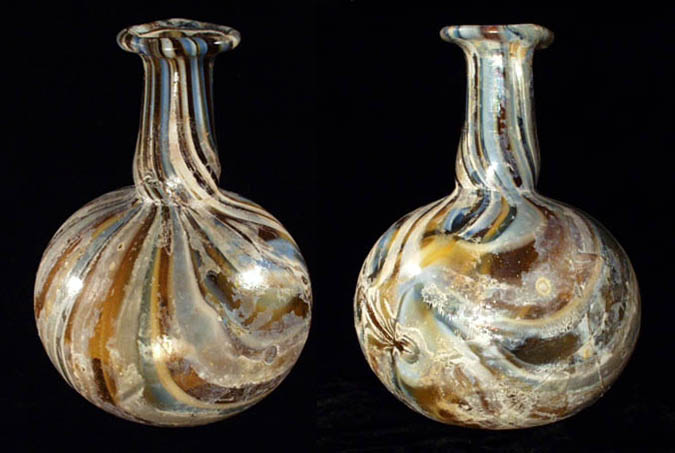
Roman marbled glass piriform unguentarium (front and back)

Perfumes were very popular in Ancient Rome. In fact, they were so heavily used that Cicero claimed that, "The right scent for a woman is none at all." They came in liquid, solid and sticky forms and were often created in a maceration process with flowers or herbs and oil. Distillation technology, as well as most of the imported ingredients, originated in the east. The most prominent perfume market in Italy was Seplasia in Capua. Perfumes were rubbed on or poured onto the user and were often believed to be helpful against different ailments, such as fever and indigestion. Different scents were appropriate for different occasions, as well as for men and women. Deodorants made from alum, iris and rose petals were common.

In addition to personal use, perfumes were used in food and to freshen the household aroma.

== Containers and mirrors ==
Makeup usually came in tablet or cake form, sold at marketplaces. Wealthy women bought expensive makeup that came in elaborate containers made from gold, wood, glass or bone. Kohl came in compartmentalized tubes that could store more than one color of eye makeup. Glassblowing, invented in the 1st century CE in Syria, lowered the price of containers. The most common color for glass was teal. Gladiator sweat and fats of the animals fighting in the arena were sold in souvenir pots outside of the games to improve complexion.

Mirrors in Ancient Rome were mostly hand mirrors made from polished metal, or mercury behind glass. Spending too much time in front of a mirror was thought to denote that a woman was weak in character.

== Prostitutes ==
Cosmetics, and especially their overuse, were commonly associated with prostitutes, both being regarded as immoral and seductive. The Latin word lenocinium actually meant both "prostitution" and "makeup". Due to their low income, prostitutes tended to use cheaper cosmetics, which emitted rather foul odors. This, combined with the strong, exotic scents used to cover up the stench, made brothels smell especially overwhelming. As prostitutes aged, with their income dependent on their appearance, they opted for more copious amounts of makeup. Courtesans often received cosmetics and perfumes as gifts or partial payment.

== Men's use ==
Men are also known to have used cosmetics in Roman times, although it was frowned upon by society. Men seen carrying mirrors were viewed as effeminate, while those using face-whitening makeup were thought to be immoral because they were expected to be tanned from working outside. Two of the more acceptable practices were the light use of certain perfumes and moderate hair removal. A man removing too much hair was viewed as effeminate, while removing too little made him seem unrefined. The Romans found it especially inappropriate for an emperor to be vain, as was apparently the case with the Emperor Otho. The Emperor Elagabalus removed all of his body hair and often donned makeup, which caused the Romans much grief.

== See also ==
- Medicamina Faciei Femineae, by Ovid, a singular didactic poem for the female face, whose methods are still used in the manufacture of cosmetics and pharmaceuticals today.
- Gavia Severa, Roman perfumer
