= Instruction of Hardjedef =

Didactic literature of the Egyptian Old Kingdom

The Instruction of Hardjedef, also known as the Teaching of Hordedef and Teaching of Djedefhor, belongs to the didactic literature of the Egyptian Old Kingdom. It is possibly the oldest of all known Instructions, composed during the 5th Dynasty according to Miriam Lichtheim, predating The Instructions of Kagemni and The Maxims of Ptahhotep. Only a few fragments from the beginning of the text have survived on a handful of New Kingdom ostraca and a Late Period wooden tablet.

The first lines of the text establish Prince Djedefhor, Khufu's son, as the author of the Instruction. In antiquity Djedefhor enjoyed a reputation for wisdom, his name appears in the Westcar Papyrus, and according to the Harper's lay from the tomb of King Intef, a copy of which survives in Papyrus Harris 500, he is mentioned in the same breath as Imhotep, his maxims having survived while his tomb had been lost. His fame was especially great during periods of classicistic revival, when he and other Old Kingdom sages became role models for aspiring scribes.
