= Instruction of Amenemope =

Ancient Egyptian literary work

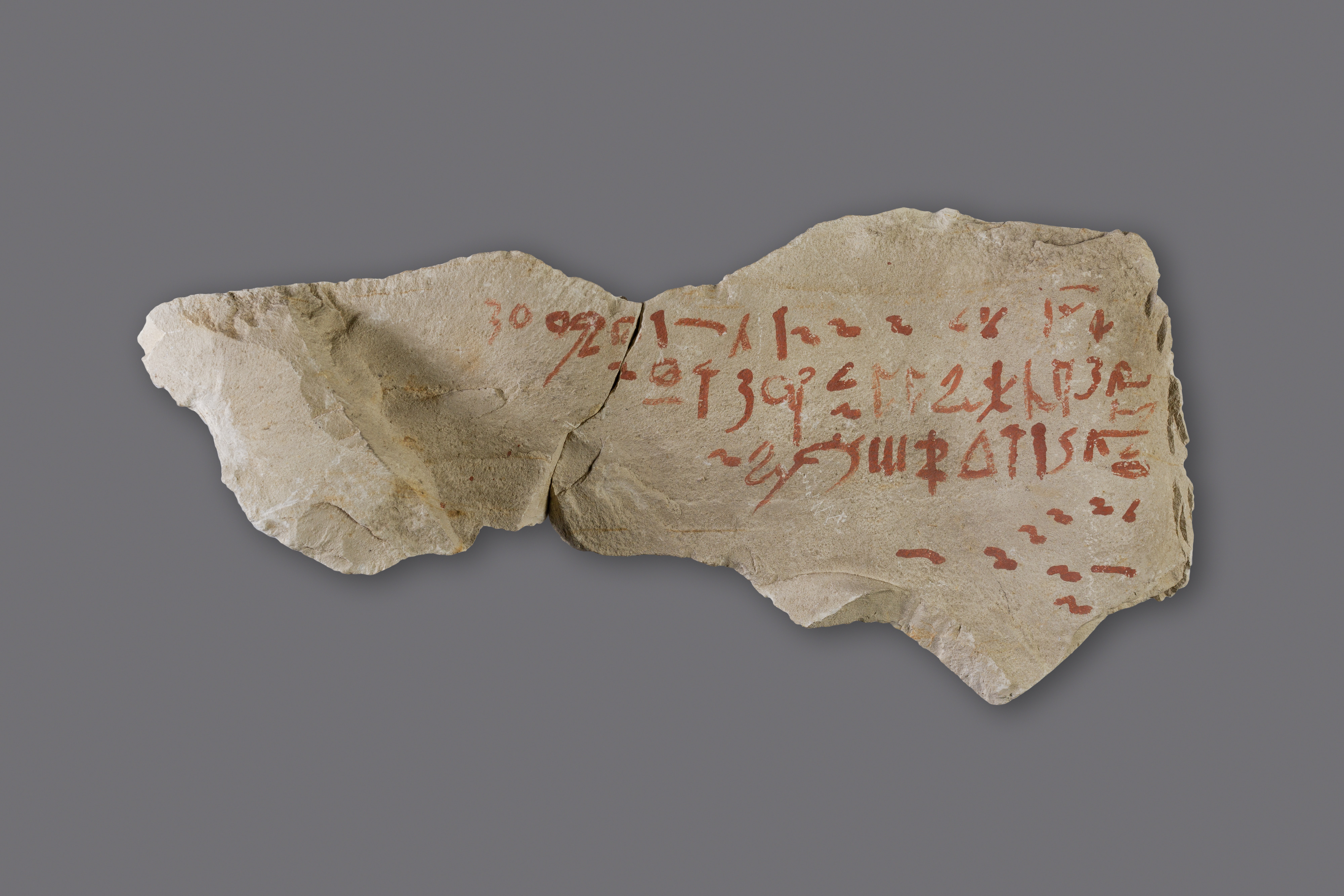
Hieratic ostracon with the beginning of "The Wisdom of Amenemope", dated to 525–404 BC.

Instruction of Amenemope (also called Instructions of Amenemopet, Wisdom of Amenemopet) is a literary work composed in Ancient Egypt, most likely during the Ramesside Period (ca. 1300–1075 BCE); it contains thirty chapters of advice for successful living, ostensibly written by the scribe Amenemope son of Kanakht as a legacy for his son. A characteristic product of the New Kingdom "Age of Personal Piety", the work reflects on the inner qualities, attitudes, and behaviors required for a happy life in the face of increasingly difficult social and economic circumstances. It is widely regarded as one of the masterpieces of ancient near-eastern wisdom literature and has been of particular interest to modern scholars because of its similarity to the later biblical Book of Proverbs.

== Overview ==
Amenemope belongs to the literary genre of "instruction" (Egyptian sebayt). It is the culmination of centuries of development going back to the Instruction of Ptahhotep in the Old Kingdom but reflects a shift in values characteristic of the New Kingdom's "Age of Personal Piety": away from material success attained through practical action, and towards inner peace achieved through patient endurance and passive acceptance of an inscrutable divine will. The author takes for granted the principles of natural law and concentrates on the deeper matters of conscience. He urges the reader to defend the weaker classes of society and to respect the elderly, widows and the poor, while he condemns abuses of power or authority. The author draws an emphatic contrast between the "silent man", who goes about his business without drawing attention or demanding his rights, and the "heated man", who makes a nuisance of himself and presses petty grievances. Contrary to worldly expectation, the author assures that the former will ultimately receive divine blessing, while the latter will inevitably go to destruction. Amenemope counsels modesty, self-control, generosity, and scrupulous honesty, while discouraging pride, impetuosity, self-advancement, fraud, and perjury—not only out of respect for Maat, the cosmic principle of right order, but also because "attempts to gain advantage to the detriment of others incur condemnation, confuse the plans of god, and lead inexorably to disgrace and punishment."

== Witnesses and publication ==
The most complete text of the Instruction of Amenemope is British Museum Papyrus 10474, acquired in Thebes by E. A. Wallis Budge in early 1888. The scroll is approximately 12 feet (3.7 m) long by 10 inches (250 mm) wide; the obverse side contains the hieratic text of the Instruction, while the reverse side is filled with a miscellany of lesser texts, including a "Calendar of Lucky and Unlucky Days", hymns to the sun and moon, and part of an onomasticon by another author of the same name. In November 1888, Peter le Page Renouf, Keeper of the Department of Oriental Antiquities at the British Museum (and Budge's supervisor), made mention of a "remarkable passage" from the papyrus and quoted a few words from it in an otherwise unrelated article about the story of Joseph in the Book of Genesis; but Renouf was forced into retirement in 1891, and publication of the papyrus was delayed for more than three decades while Budge concentrated on other projects such as the Book of the Dead.

In 1922 Budge finally published a short account of the text along with brief hieroglyphic extracts and translations in a French academic work, followed in 1923 by the official British Museum publication of the full text in photofacsimile with hieroglyphic transcription and translation. In 1924 he went over the same ground again in a somewhat more popular vein, including a more extensive commentary. Subsequent publications of BM 10474 in hieroglyphic transcription include those of H.O. Lange (1925), J. Ruffle (1964), and V. Laisney (2007). Photographic copies of the papyrus are available from the British Museum.

Since the initial publication of BM 10474, additional fragments of Amenemope have been identified on a scrap of papyrus, four writing tablets, an ostracon, and a graffito, bringing the total number of witnesses to eight. Unfortunately, none of the other texts is very extensive, and the British Museum papyrus remains the primary witness to the text. As can be seen from the following table, the dates assigned by scholars to the various witnesses range from a maximum of ca. 1069 BCE (for the papyrus fragment and one of the writing tablets) down to a minimum of ca. 500 BCE (for BM 10474):

Textual witnesses by date
| Dates B.C. | Dynasties | Fragment | Type | Lines |
|---|---|---|---|---|
| 1069–712 | 21–22 | Stockholm MM 18416 | Papyrus | 191–257 |
| 1069–712 | 21–22 | Louvre E. 17173 | Tablet | 34–37 |
| 1000–900 | late 21 – early 22 | Cairo 1840 | Ostracon | 47–66 |
| 945–712 | 22 | Medinet Habu | Graffito | 1 |
| 747–525 | 25–26 | Turin 6237 | Tablet | 470–500 |
| 747–525 | 25–26 | Moscow I 1 δ 324 | Tablet | 105–115 |
| 747–525 | 25–26 | Turin Suppl. 4661 | Tablet | 1 |
| 600–500 | late 26 – early 27 | B. M. 10474 | Papyrus | 1–551 |

== Biblical parallels ==
Egyptian influence on Israel and Judah was particularly strong in the reign of Hezekiah during Egypt's Third Intermediate Period; as a result, "Hebrew literature is permeated with concepts and figures derived from the didactic treatises of Egypt", with Amenemope often cited as the foremost example. Even in his first brief publication of excerpts from Amenemope in 1922, Budge noted its obvious resemblance to the biblical wisdom books. He amplified these comments in his 1923 and 1924 publications, observing that the religiously based morality of Amenemope "closely resembles" the precepts of the Hebrew Bible, and adducing specific parallels between Amenemope and texts in Proverbs, Psalms, and Deuteronomy. Others soon followed his lead.

=== Erman's position ===
The most notable of these was Adolf Erman, "the Dean of all Egyptologists", who in 1924 published an extensive list of correspondences between the texts of Amenemope and the biblical Book of Proverbs, with the bulk of them concentrated in Proverbs 22:17–23:11. It was Erman who used Amenemope to emend a difficult reading in the text of Proverbs 22:20, where the Hebrew word shilshom ("three days ago") appeared to be a copyist's error that could be meaningfully translated only with difficulty. Erman pointed out that substituting the similar word sheloshim ("thirty") not only made good sense in context, but yielded the following close parallel between the two texts, with the now-restored "thirty sayings" in Proverbs 22:20 corresponding exactly to the thirty numbered chapters in Amenemope:

(Proverbs 22:20): "Have I not written for you thirty sayings of counsel and knowledge?" (ESV)

(Amenemope, ch. 30, line 539): "Look to these thirty chapters; they inform, they educate."

Erman also argued that this correspondence demonstrated that the Hebrew text had been influenced by the Egyptian instead of the other way around, since the Egyptian text of Amenemope explicitly enumerates thirty chapters whereas the Hebrew text of Proverbs does not have such clear-cut divisions, and would therefore be more likely to lose the original meaning during copying. Since Erman's time there has been a near consensus among scholars that there exists a literary connection between the two works, although the direction of influence remains contentious even today. The majority has concluded that Proverbs 22:17–23:10 was dependent on Amenemope; a minority is split between viewing the Hebrew text as the original inspiration for Amenemope and viewing both works as dependent on a now lost Semitic source.

=== The majority position ===
A major factor in determining the direction of influence is the date at which Amenemope was composed. At one time the mid-1st millennium BCE was put forward as a likely date for the composition of Amenemope, which gave some support to the argument for the priority of Proverbs. However, Jaroslav Černý, whose authority on New Kingdom paleography was so great that his conclusions were considered "unquestionable", dated the fragmentary Amenemope text on the Cairo 1840 ostracon to the late 21st dynasty. Since a 21st-dynasty date inevitably makes Amenemope chronologically prior to the earliest possible date for Proverbs, this would definitively establish the priority of Amenemope over Proverbs and make influence in the other direction impossible.

Other evidence for Egyptian priority includes:

- the close literary relationship between Amenemope and earlier Ancient Egyptian works such as the Instruction of Kagemni and the Instruction of Ptahhotep (both dated to at least the 12th dynasty) and the Instruction of Ani (dated to the late 18th or early 19th dynasty);
- the demonstrably native Egyptian character of the genre, themes, and vocabulary of Amenemope;
- the discovery of the editorial and structural mechanisms by which the Egyptian original was adapted by the biblical author.

By the 1960s there was a virtual consensus among scholars in support of the priority of Amenemope and its influence on Proverbs. For example, John A. Wilson declared in the mid-20th century: "[W]e believe that there is a direct connection between these two pieces of wisdom literature, and that Amen-em-Opet was the ancestor text. The secondary nature of the Hebrew seems established." Many study Bibles and commentaries followed suit, including the Jerusalem Bible, introductions to the Old Testament by Pfeiffer and Eissfeldt, and others. The translators of the Catholic New American Bible, reflecting and extending this agreement, even went so far as to emend the obscure Hebrew text of Proverbs 22:19 (traditionally translated as "I have made known to you this day, even to you") to read "I make known to you the words of Amen-em-Ope."

=== The minority response ===
R. N. Whybray, who at one point supported the majority position, changed sides during the 1990s and cast doubt on the relationship between Amenemope and Proverbs, while still acknowledging certain affinities. He argued, in part, that only some of the topics in the Egyptian text can be found in Proverbs 22:17–24:22 and that their sequence differs. J. A. Emerton and Nili Shupak have subsequently argued strongly against Whybray's conclusions. John Ruffle takes a more conservative approach:

The connection so casually assumed is often very superficial, rarely more than similarity of subject matter, often quite differently treated and does not survive detailed examination. I believe it can merit no more definite verdict than 'not proven' and that it certainly does not exist to the extent that is often assumed. ... The parallels that I have drawn between [the huehuetlatolli of the Aztecs], (recorded by Bernardino de Sahagún in the 1500s) and ancient Near Eastern wisdom are in no way exhaustive, but the fact that they can be produced so easily underlines what should be obvious anyway, that such precepts and images are universally acceptable and hence that similar passages may occur in Proverbs and Amenemope simply by coincidence.

=== Comparison of texts ===
A number of passages in the Instruction of Amenemope have been compared with the Book of Proverbs, including:

(Proverbs 22:17–18): "Incline thine ear, and hear the words of the wise, And apply thine heart to my doctrine; For it is pleasant if thou keep them in thy belly, that they may be established together upon thy lips"

(Amenemope, ch. 1): "Give thine ear, and hear what I say, And apply thine heart to apprehend; It is good for thee to place them in thine heart, let them rest in the casket of thy belly; That they may act as a peg upon thy tongue"

(Proverbs 22:22): "Rob not the poor, for he is poor, neither oppress (or crush) the lowly in the gate."

(Amenemope, ch. 2): "Beware of robbing the poor, and oppressing the afflicted."

(Proverbs 22:24–5): "Do not befriend the man of anger, Nor go with a wrathful man, Lest thou learn his ways and take a snare for thy soul."

(Amenemope, ch. 10): "Associate not with a passionate man, Nor approach him for conversation; Leap not to cleave to such an one; That terror carry thee not away."

(Proverbs 22:29): "[if you] You see a man quick in his work, before kings will he stand, before cravens, he will not stand."

(Amenemope, ch. 30): "A scribe who is skillful in his business findeth worthy to be a courtier"

(Proverbs 23:1): "When thou sittest to eat with a ruler, Consider diligently what is before thee; And put a knife to thy throat, If thou be a man given to appetite. Be not desirous of his dainties, for they are breads of falsehood."

(Amenemope, ch. 23): "Eat not bread in the presence of a ruler, And lunge not forward(?) with thy mouth before a governor(?). When thou art replenished with that to which thou has no right, It is only a delight to thy spittle. Look upon the dish that is before thee, And let that (alone) supply thy need." (see above)

(Proverbs 23:4–5): "Toil not to become rich, And cease from dishonest gain; For wealth maketh to itself wings, Like an eagle that flieth heavenwards"

(Amenemope, ch. 7): "Toil not after riches; If stolen goods are brought to thee, they remain not over night with thee. They have made themselves wings like geese. And have flown into the heavens."

(Proverbs 23:9): "Speak not in the hearing of a fool, for he will despise the wisdom of thy words"

(Amenemope, ch. 21): "Empty not thine inmost soul to everyone, nor spoil (thereby) thine influence"

(Proverbs 23:10): "Remove not the widows landmark; And enter not into the field of the fatherless."

(Amenemope, ch. 6): "Remove not the landmark from the bounds of the field ... and violate not the widows boundary"

(Proverbs 23:12): "Apply thine heart unto instruction and thine ears to the words of knowledge"

(Amenemope, ch. 1): "Give thine ears, hear the words that are said, give thine heart to interpret them."

== See also ==
- Ancient Egyptian literature
