= Ptahhotep (Djedkare) =

Ancient Egyptian official

- Vizier of Egypt
- Burial: Mastaba C6, Saqqara, Egypt

Ptahhotep was an ancient Egyptian official of the Fifth Dynasty, most likely under king Djedkare Isesi. His most important office was that of a vizier, making him the most important official at the royal court, only second to the king. He held other titles, such as overseer of the treasuries, overseer of the scribes of the king's document, and overseer of the six big houses and overseer of all royal works of the king.

Ptahhotep is one of several viziers at the end of the Fifth Dynasty with this name. He is mainly known from is mastaba (C6) at Saqqara. The mastaba was built in one unit with the mastaba of another vizier, who was also called Ptahhotep with the second name Desher. They were perhaps brothers. In both mastabas, nothing was found providing a clue for a dating. On observations on the style of the architecture it had been argued that they date to the reign of Menkauhor and Djedkare Isesi. Ptahhotep perhaps dating to the early years of the latter king.

== Literature ==
- Mariette, Auguste; Maspero, Gaston (1889). Les mastabas de l'Ancien Empire: Fragment du dernier ouvrage de A. Mariette, publié d'après le manuscrit de l'auteur. Paris. OCLC 46226552.
- Strudwick, Nigel (1985). The Administration of Egypt in the Old Kingdom: The Highest Titles and Their Holders (PDF). Studies in Egyptology. London; Boston: Kegan Paul International. ISBN 978-0-7103-0107-9.
