= Ptahhotep Desher =

Ancient Egyptian official

- Vizier of Egypt
Egyptian name
p t H Htp t p G27Ptḥ-ḥtp-dšr
- Tenure: c. 2415 BC
- Burial: Mastaba C6, Saqqara, Egypt

Ptahhotep Desher (fl. c. 2415 BC) was an Ancient Egyptian official at the end of the Fifth Dynasty, most likely in office under kings Menkauhor Kaiu and/or Djedkare Isesi. His main function was that of a vizier. This was the most important office in Ancient Egypt, second only to the king. Ptahhotep also held other titles, such as overseer of the six great houses, overseer of the scribes of the royal documents and overseer of all royal works. These are all important functions, often held by a vizier.

Ptahhotep Desher is mainly known from is mastaba (C6) at Saqqara. The mastaba was built in one unit with the mastaba of another vizier, who was also called Ptahhotep. They were perhaps brothers. In both mastabas were not found any inscriptions providing a clue for a dating. On observations on the style of the architecture it had been argued that they date to the reign of Menkauhor and Djedkare Isesi.

== Bibliography ==
- Mariette, Auguste; Maspero, Gaston (1889). Les mastabas de l'Ancien Empire: Fragment du dernier ouvrage de A. Mariette, publié d'après le manuscrit de l'auteur. Paris. OCLC 46226552.
- Strudwick, Nigel (1985). The administration of Egypt in the Old Kingdom: the highest titles and their holders (PDF). Studies in Egyptology. London, Boston: KPI. ISBN 978-0-71-030107-9.
