= Ptahhotep Tjefi =

Ancient Egyptian vizier

- Vizier of Egypt
- Burial: Saqqara, Egypt
- Father: Akhethetep

Ptahhotep Tjefi, also called Ptahhotep II was an ancient Egyptian official who lived at the end of the Fifth Dynasty, most likely under king Djedkare Isesi and under king Unas. His main function at the royal court was that of the vizier, making him to the most important man at the court, only second to the king. Ptahhotep, whose second name was Tjefi, came from an influential family. His father was the vizier Akhethetep. His grandfather was the vizier Ptahhotep (I). Ptahhotep is mainly known from his mastaba at Saqqara. The burial complex was built for him and his father Akhethetep.

== Literature ==
- Davies, N. de G. (1901). The Mastaba of Ptahhetep and Akhethetep at Saqqareh (PDF). London.
- Strudwick, Nigel (1985). The Administration of Egypt in the Old Kingdom: The Highest Titles and Their Holders (PDF). Studies in Egyptology. London; Boston: Kegan Paul International. ISBN 978-0-7103-0107-9.
