= Akhethetep (son of Ptahhotep) =

Ancient Egyptian vizier

- Vizier of Egypt
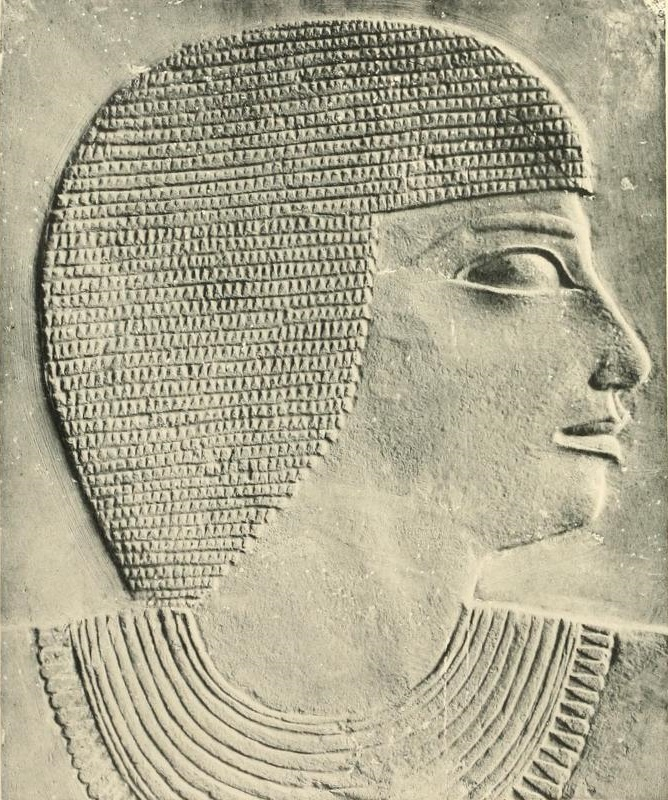
- Relief of Akhethetep, from his mastaba
Egyptian name
t G25 Htp t p A1Akhethétep
- Tenure: c. 2400 BC
- Pharaoh: Isesi
- Burial: Saqqara, Egypt
- Spouse: Khamerernebty
- Father: Ptahhotep
- Children: Ptahhotep

Akhethetep (also Akhethotep or Akhty-hotep; fl. c. 2400 BC) was a high dignitary of ancient Egypt who lived during the Fifth Dynasty. Akhethotep and his son Ptahhotep Tjefi were senior court officials during the rule of Djedkare (2414–2375 BC) and of Unas (Wenis), towards the end of the 5th Dynasty (2494–2345 BC). Akhethetep's titles included that of a vizier, making him to the highest official at the royal court, only second to the king. He was also overseer of the treasuries, overseer of the scribes of the king's documents and overseer of the granaries. Akhethetep was the son of Ptahhotep. His father was vizier too.

He is famous for his tomb, discovered in Saqqara. The plan was recorded by Mariette and it was published by Norman Davies. It is a joined mastaba belonging to Ptahhotep Tjefi and Akhethetep.

== Literature ==
- Davies, N. de G. (1901). The Mastaba of Ptathetep and Akhethetep at Saqqareh (PDF). London.
- Mariette, Auguste; Maspero, Gaston (1889). Les mastabas de l'Ancien Empire: Fragment du dernier ouvrage de A. Mariette, publié d'après le manuscrit de l'auteur. Paris. OCLC 46226552.
- Strudwick, Nigel (1985). Davies, N V (ed.). The Administration of Egypt in the Old Kingdom: The Highest Titles and Their Holders (PDF). Studies in Egyptology. London; Boston: Routledge/Kegan Paul International. ISBN 978-0-7103-0107-9. Archived from the original (PDF) on 3 April 2014.
