= Akhethetep (overseer of the great house) =

Akhethetep was an ancient Egyptian official mainly known from his mastaba found at Saqqara (no. E 17). Not much is known about Akhethetep. On the reliefs of his mastaba he bears several titles, including overseer of the great house. This was an administrative title of rather unclear function. He had also several religious titles, including priest of Maat and priest of Hathor, lady of Dendera. He had also priestly functions at the funerary cult of different kings and was Priest of Nefer-Djedkare (this is the name of the pyramid of king Djedkare and priest at Nefersut-Unas (the name of the pyramid of king Unas).

The exact dating of Akhethetep is uncertain, but he might belong to the end of the 5th or to the beginning of the 6th Dynasty.

== Literature ==
- Strudwick, Nigel (1985). The Administration of Egypt in the Old Kingdom: The Highest Titles and Their Holders (PDF). Studies in Egyptology. London; Boston: Kegan Paul International. ISBN 0710301073. Archived from the original (PDF) on 2014-04-03.
- Mariette, Auguste; Maspero, Gaston (1889). Les mastabas de l'Ancien Empire: Fragment du dernier ouvrage de A. Mariette, publié d'après le manuscrit de l'auteur. Paris. OCLC 46226552.
