= Kagemni I =

Ancient Egyptian vizier and author

Kagemni
- Vizier of Egypt
- Dynasty: 4th Dynasty
- Pharaoh: Huni, Sneferu

Kagemni I was an ancient Egyptian who lived from the end of the 3rd Dynasty to the beginning of the 4th Dynasty. He was a vizier to both Pharaoh Huni and Pharaoh Sneferu.

== History ==
Kagemni may have written a set of instructions, known as the Instructions of Kagemni, for his sons. The instructions are part of the Prisse Papyrus, which also contains the teachings of Ptahhotep. At the end of the text regarding Kagemni, it is mentioned that after he learnt all he could about the nature of men, he wrote down what he had learnt so as to pass it onto his children. The text then proceeds to mention that the King of Upper and Lower Egypt Huni had died and was succeeded by Sneferu. Kagemni was appointed as overseer of the pyramid town and Vizier by Sneferu. Kagemni was highly respected in later times and it is possible that he was deified after his death.

Kagemni should not be confused with vizier Kagemni from the time of Pharaoh Teti (6th Dynasty).
