= Émile Prisse d'Avennes =

French Egyptologist (1807–1879)

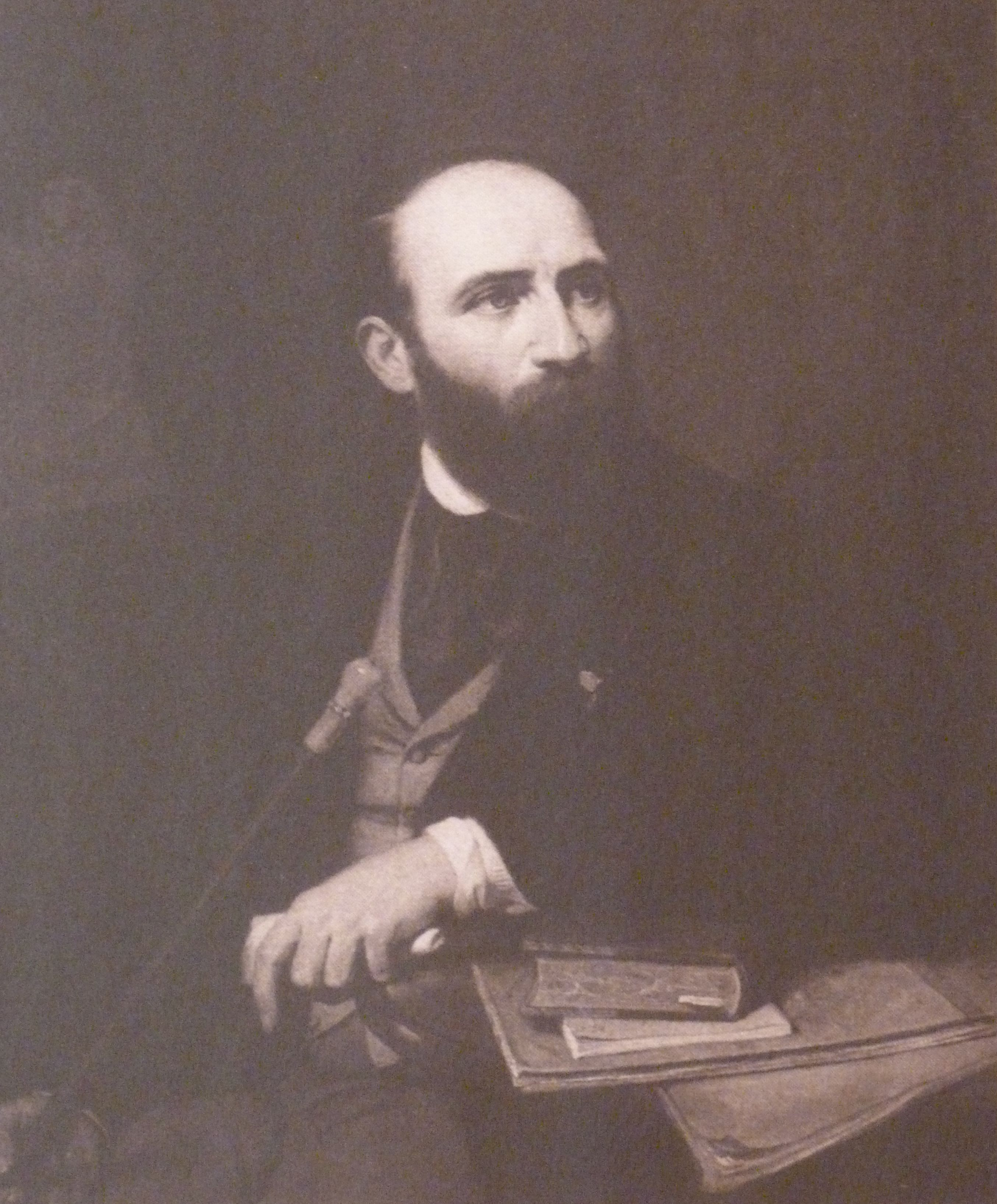
Émile Prisse d'Avennes

Achille-Constant-Théodore-Émile Prisse d'Avennes (27 January 1807, Avesnes-sur-Helpe – 16 February 1879, Paris) was a French archaeologist, Egyptologist, architect and writer.

== Biography ==
Prisse d'Avennes was born in Avesnes-sur-Helpe, France, on 27 January 1807, to a noble family of French origin. After the early death of his father in 1814, on the guidance of his grandfather he enrolled at college a year later to train for a career within the legal profession. Prisse d'Avennes decided to become an archaeologist in 1836 after a period teaching at the infantry school in Damietta.

== Life in Egypt ==
In 1827 when he reached Egypt, he was hired by the viceroy of Egypt, Muhammad Ali Pasha, as a civil engineer. He spent many years living as an Egyptian, adopting the name Idriss-effendi, learning to speak Arabic and practicing Islam. He stated that adopting Egyptian culture resulted in a greater understanding of Egyptian society and people.

== Oriental Album ==
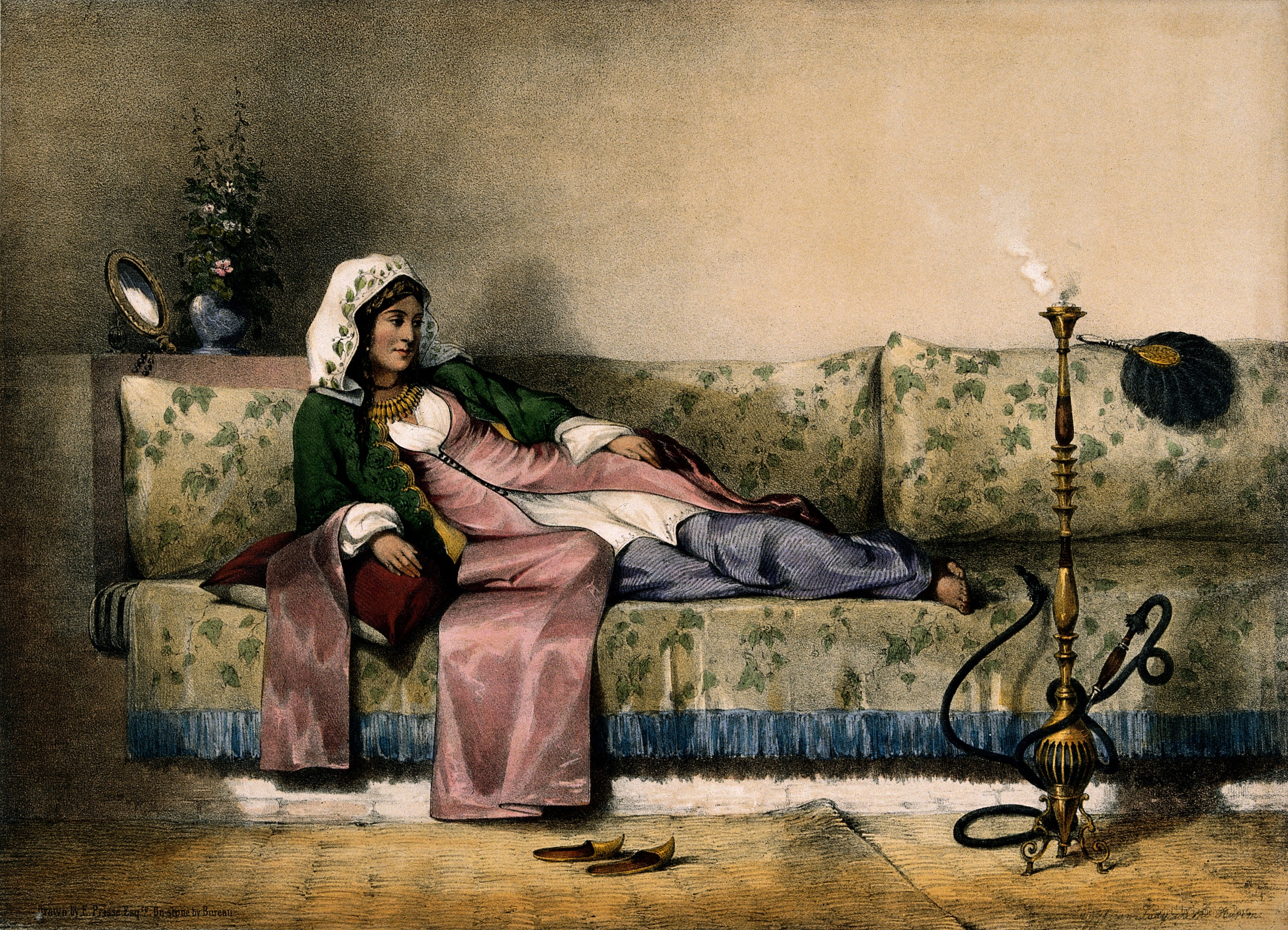
Image of a reclining Muslim woman from the Oriental Album.

In 1848, he contributed 30 lithograph images depicting the people living on the Nile Valley to a costume book titled Oriental Album written by James Augustus St. John who was a British author and traveler.

== Selected bibliography ==
- Arabic Art: monuments after Cairo from the 7th century to the end of the 18th century (1869-1877)(with Schmidt,C) NY public library archive retrieved GMT12:56 25.9.11
- Arabic Decoration (1885)
- Atlas of Egyptian Art, with an introduction by Maarten J. Raven, captions by Olaf E. Kaper (reedition AUC Press 2000)
- Egyptian monuments, bas-reliefs, paintings, sculptures (1842) NY public library archive retrieved GMT12:51.25.9.11
- Monuments of Egypt and of the Nubie: descriptive Notices and the letters of Egypt and the Nubie retrieved 13:07GMT 24/09/2011
- Histoire de l'art égyptien d'après les monuments depuis les temps les plus reculés jusqu'à la domination romaine par Prisse d'Avennes; ouvrage publié sous les auspices du Ministère de l'instruction publique, des cultes et des beaux-arts. Texte par P. Marchandon de La Faye ... (d'après les notes de l'auteur) Published 1878
- Histoire de l'art egyptien : d'après les monuments retrieved 12:25 24/09/11
- page.393 of text retrieved (approx') GMT13:45 24/09/11
- http://archive.aramcoworld.com/issue/199006/prisse-a.portrait.htm

== See also ==
- Arabic Art
- Prisse Papyrus
