= Medicamina Faciei Femineae =

Poem written by Ovid

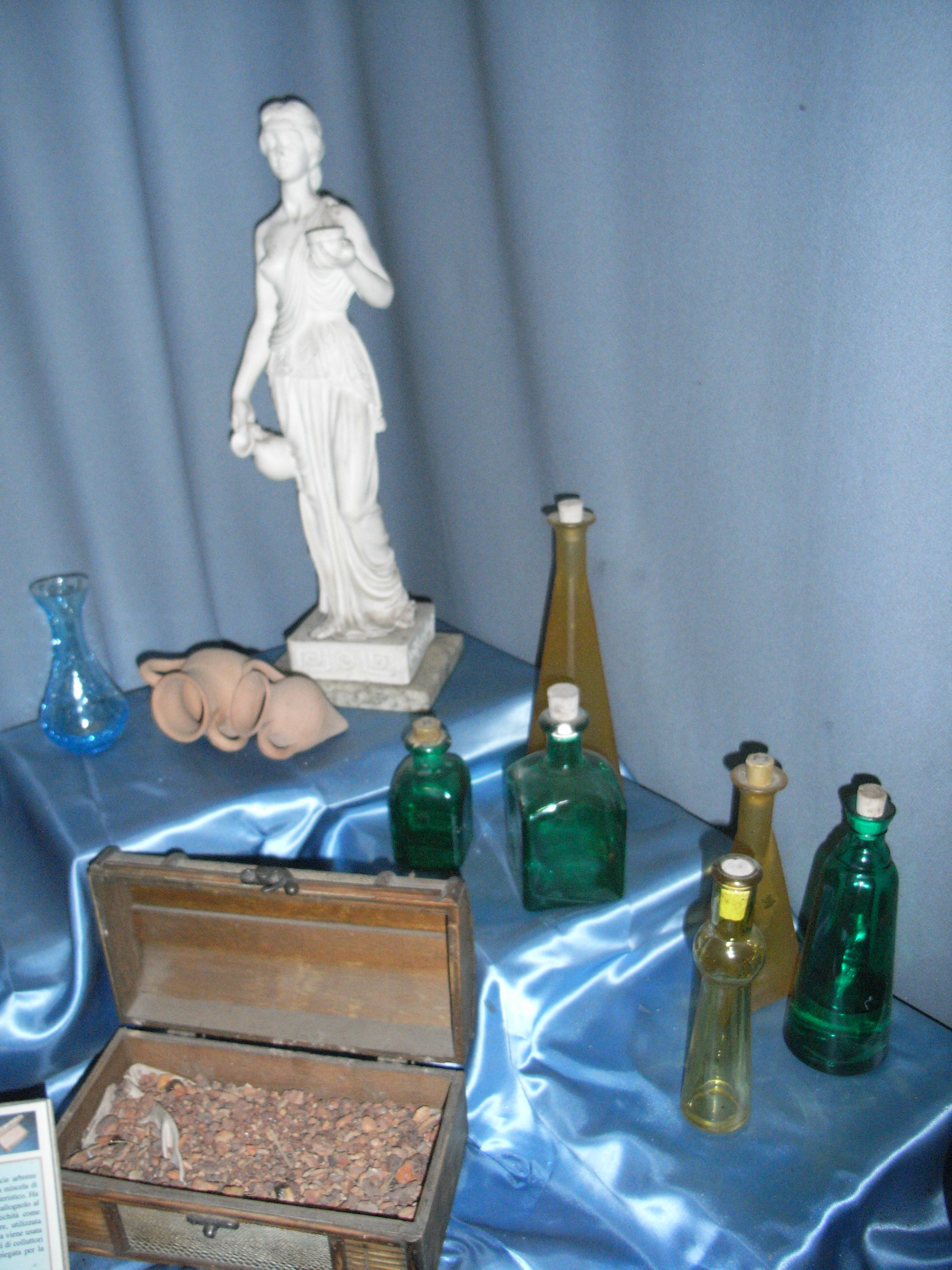
Amphorae, scented body oil, perfume bottles (unguentarium), rose petals and a figurine, all from Ancient Rome.

Medicamina Faciei Femineae (Cosmetics for the Female Face, also known as The Art of Beauty) is a didactic poem written in elegiac couplets by the Roman poet Ovid. In the hundred extant verses, Ovid defends the use of cosmetics by Roman women and provides five recipes for facial treatments. Other writers at the time condemned women's usage of cosmetics.

== Background ==
The title and approximate date of the poem are known from a brief mention in another of Ovid's works, Ars Amatoria, in the third book of which the poet states that he has already written "a small work, a little book" on medicamina, or cosmetics. The Medicamina must then predate the third book of Ars Amatoria, a work whose composition has been variously placed between 1 BC and AD 8, the year of Ovid's exile. Only one hundred of an estimated five to eight hundred original lines survive. These fall neatly into sections, each exactly fifty lines long. The first section is an elaborate introduction in which Ovid introduces and defends his subject matter; the second comprises five recipes for cosmetic treatments which include common ingredients and precise measurements.

== Form ==
The poem is Ovid's first attempt at didactic elegy. This poetic genre, perfected by Ovid in his Ars Amatoria, was a curious amalgam of the moralizing and pedagogical tone of didactic poetry and the frivolous subject matter common to Latin elegiac. In the earliest known example of didactic poetry, Works and Days, the Greek poet Hesiod admonishes a dissolute brother to lead a life of honest labor. Centuries later in 29 BC, the Roman poet Vergil, writing in Latin while taking his inspiration in part from Hesiod, published the Georgics, a work whose ostensible purpose was to provide advice on agriculture. Ovid, writing a generation later for an audience to whom the Georgics were well known, used Vergil's sober language to instruct girls on "what care can enhance your looks, and how your beauty may be preserved". Rather than using the dactylic hexameters of Hesiod and Vergil, Ovid casts his advice in elegiac couplets, the traditional meter of love poetry. The contrast of serious tone and light-hearted meter transforms the Medicamina Faciei Femineae into a parody of Vergil's Georgics.

== Contents ==
Before going into detail about ancient Roman cosmetics, Ovid emphasizes manners as a timeless feature of beauty and attractiveness.

In the second half of the Medicamina Faciei Femineae, Ovid displays his command of the poet's art in taking a practical manual replete with technical details and transforming it into effective verse. Despite the facetious nature of the introduction, the five recipes included in the final 50 lines seem to be genuine, or at least plausible, cosmetic treatments. A representative example is a mixture of barley, vetch, egg, hartshorn, narcissus bulb, gum, Tuscan spelt, and honey. Ovid promises that any woman who uses this concoction on her face "will shine smoother than her own mirror."

The majority of the ingredients Ovid prescribes are in fact effective skin treatments, and several, such as oatmeal, wheat germ and egg white, are still used in the manufacture of cosmetics and pharmaceuticals today. On this point, Ovid contrasts favorably with the Roman natural philosopher Pliny the Elder, whose compendious treatment of facial remedies often includes exotic, poisonous, or disgusting ingredients.
