= Prisse Papyrus =

Ancient Egyptian papyrus

Papyrus Prisse
- Bibliothèque nationale de France
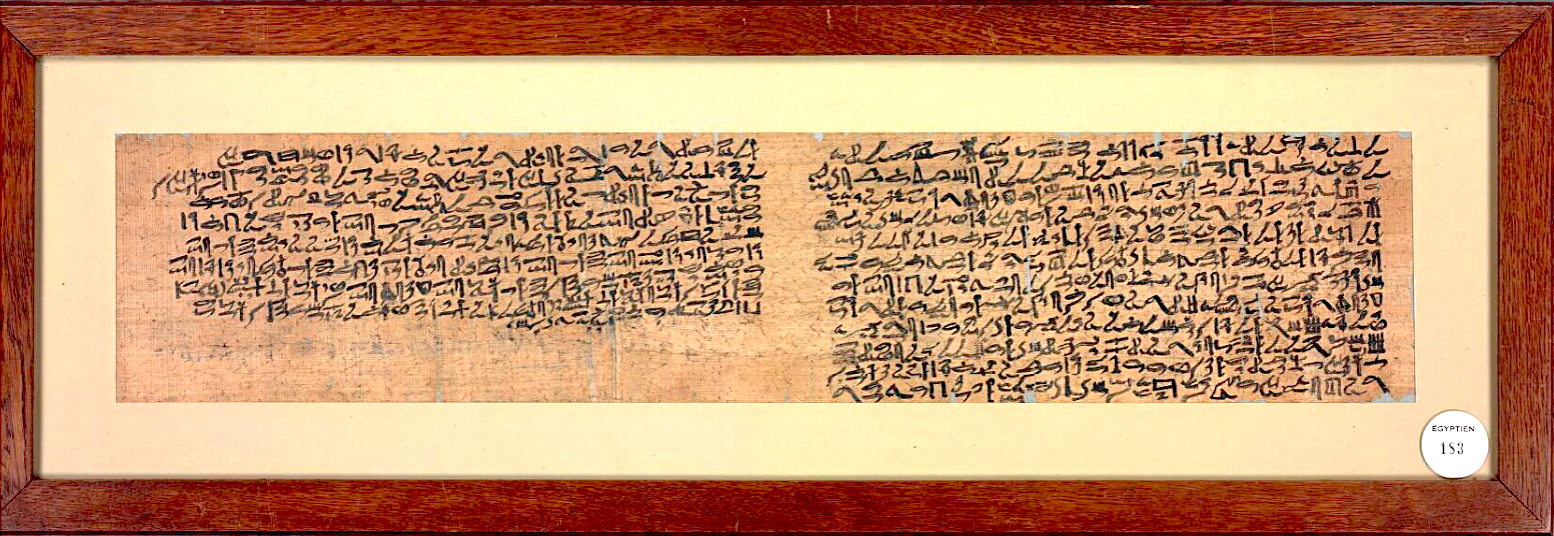
- Papyrus Prisse- Part I, two columns of the Instructions of Kagemni
- Type: charter
- Date: c. 2000 BC
- Language: Egyptian
- Material: papyrus paint
- Size: Length: 7.05 meters Width: c. 14.75 cm
- Format: double columns
- Condition: conserved
- Script: hieratic
- Contents: Instructions of Kagemni and Maxims of Ptahhotep
- Discovered: Cairo, 1843

The Prisse Papyrus is an ancient Egyptian text written on papyrus in abbreviated hieratic script, sometimes referred to as the "oldest book in the world", named after the French Egyptologist Émile Prisse d'Avennes, who purchased the papyrus scroll in Cairo in 1843 claiming it was stolen from excavations he was conducting near Thebes. Prisse donated the papyrus to the Bibliothèque nationale de France and published a facsimile in 1947.

== Papyrus assesment ==
When Prisse d'Avennes bought the Cairo papyrus he could not obtain any reliable information about its origin or where it was discovered. Since he himself was conducting his own archaeological excavations at Dra' Abu el-Naga and the seller was one of his former workers, he was convinced, as he told the Egyptologist Chabas, that the manuscript was part of the funerary equipment of one of the Intef kings of the 11th Dynasty, whose tomb he had recently discovered in the necropolis of El-Tarif. (Note: The El-Tarif necropolis located from Dra' Abu el-Naga ~1.7 km east.).This hypothesis was not questioned later, either. If the text dates from the Old Kingdom, the papyrus is, as paleographic and epigraphic analysis of the script has shown, undeniably somewhat older than the known literary manuscripts of the 12th Dynasty and the papyrus can be assigned to the beginnings of the era of the first Theban Empire.

The papyrus scroll is still in excellent condition. It was originally written with another text that had been washed/cleaned. It was then overwritten with the Instructions of Kagemni in two columns of lines totalling around 1.37 meters and The Maxims of Ptahhotep, which fills the rest of the papyrus. Although the first surviving column of the papyrus is complete, the possible beginning of the papyrus, which used to be full of holes, was cut off beforehand, so the beginning of the Instructions of Kagemni is not recorded. The second text of the Maxims of Ptahhotep, (columns 4–19), occupies the rest of the papyrus. While the Instructions of Kagemni is unique, the second text of the Maxims of Ptahhotep is known from several other copies, two in the British Museum, dating to the Middle Kingdom, and one in the Egyptian Museum, but they differ somewhat in text from the original Prisse.

The calligraphic treatment shows that the scribe of the Prisse papyrus was evidently a professional scribe, very erudite and experienced, because it is seen that he sometimes gets carried away by the meaning of what he writes, and once he reaches the end of a meaningful text, he goes back and adjusts the graphic form of the writing. He is also a scribe who experimented, hierarchical text at that time begins to be written in lines and formatted into pages 25-30 cm wide. The written text has the characteristics of a work of art.

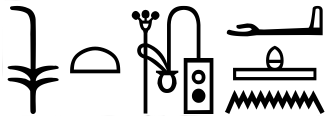
In ancients Egypt, scribes were highly educated individuals who played a crucial role in the administrative, religious, and intellectual life of the society. They were responsible for tasks such as record-keeping, drafting legal documents, and maintaining religious texts. Scribes were held in high esteem in ancient Egyptian society, and their work was considered prestigious and essential for the functioning of the state and religious institutions. Sons of scribes inherited their father’s civic position as for example, "Scribe of the King’s documents"

Scriber immortality

Be a scribe, put it in thy heart. That thy name may far similarly.
More profitable is a book than a graven tombstone, then a chapel wall firmly established.
This serves as chapels and pyramids to the a man’s name may be pronounced
Assuredly profitable in the necropolis is a name on the lips of mankind.
A man hath perished and is corps is become dirt. All his kindred have crumbled to dust
but writings cause him to be remembered in the mouth of the reciter.
More profitable is a book then the house of the builder, then chapels in the West.
Better is then a stabilshed castle and then a memorial-stone in a temple.

The Prisse Papyrus composition there is a picture of the socio-cultural relations in the upper strata of Egyptian society in the peak period of the Old Kingdom and then also in the considered time of the creation of the copy in the 11th to 12th dynasty, when the empire was reunified after the First Intermediate Period ( 2118–1980 BC). The newly established dynasty sought its legitimacy by referring to the legacy of their famous ancestors, where similar elements of learning appear as in the Prisse Papyrus, described here, many copies occurred from the New Kingdom were found in Deir el-Medina in the local scribal school.

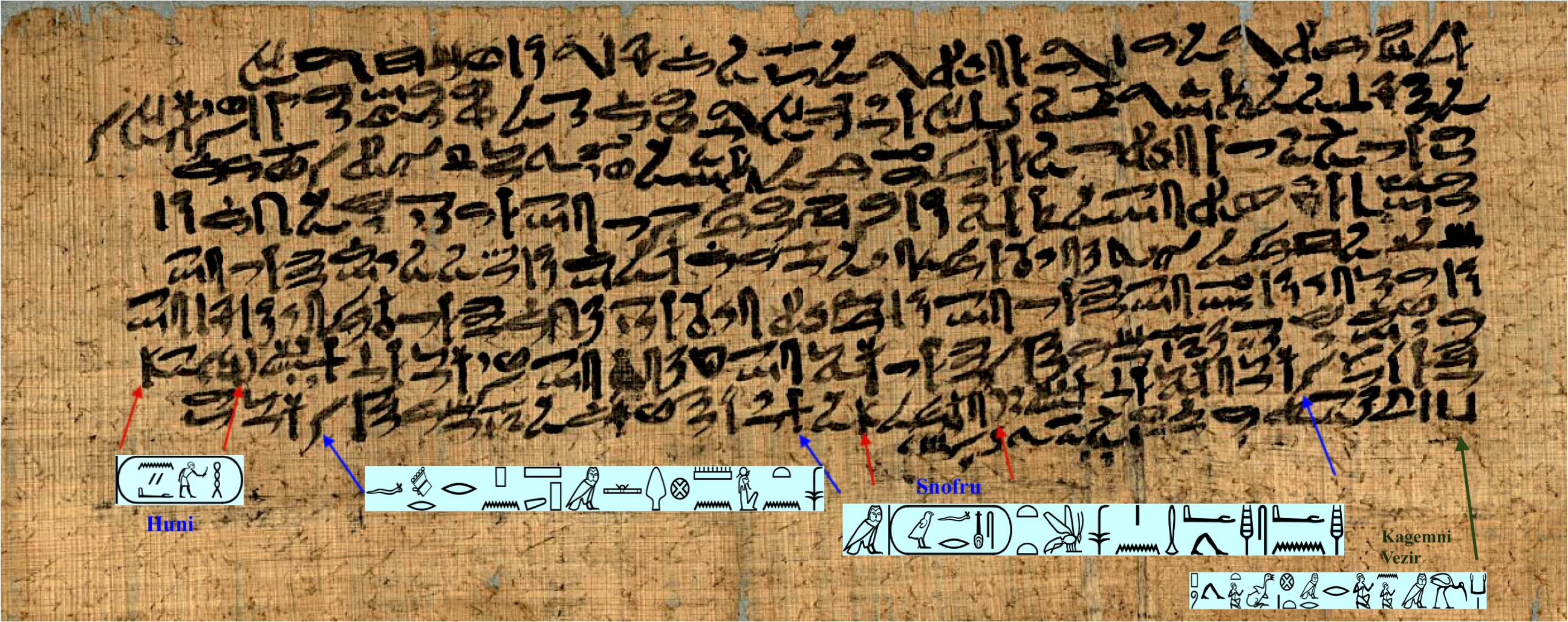
The second column of Instruction Kagemni, the last raw hieroglyphic transcription: "King Huni died and king Snefrue become beneficent king i this entire land and Kagemni was promoted to mayor and vizir"

== Gallery ==
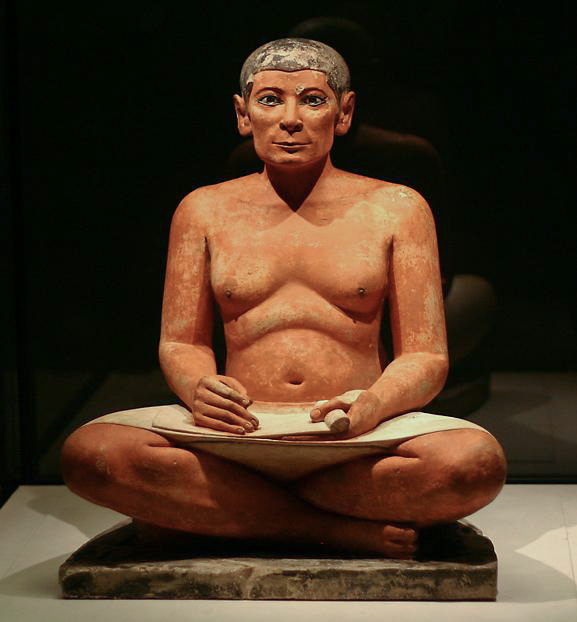
The Seated Scribe Saqqara 5.th Dynasty

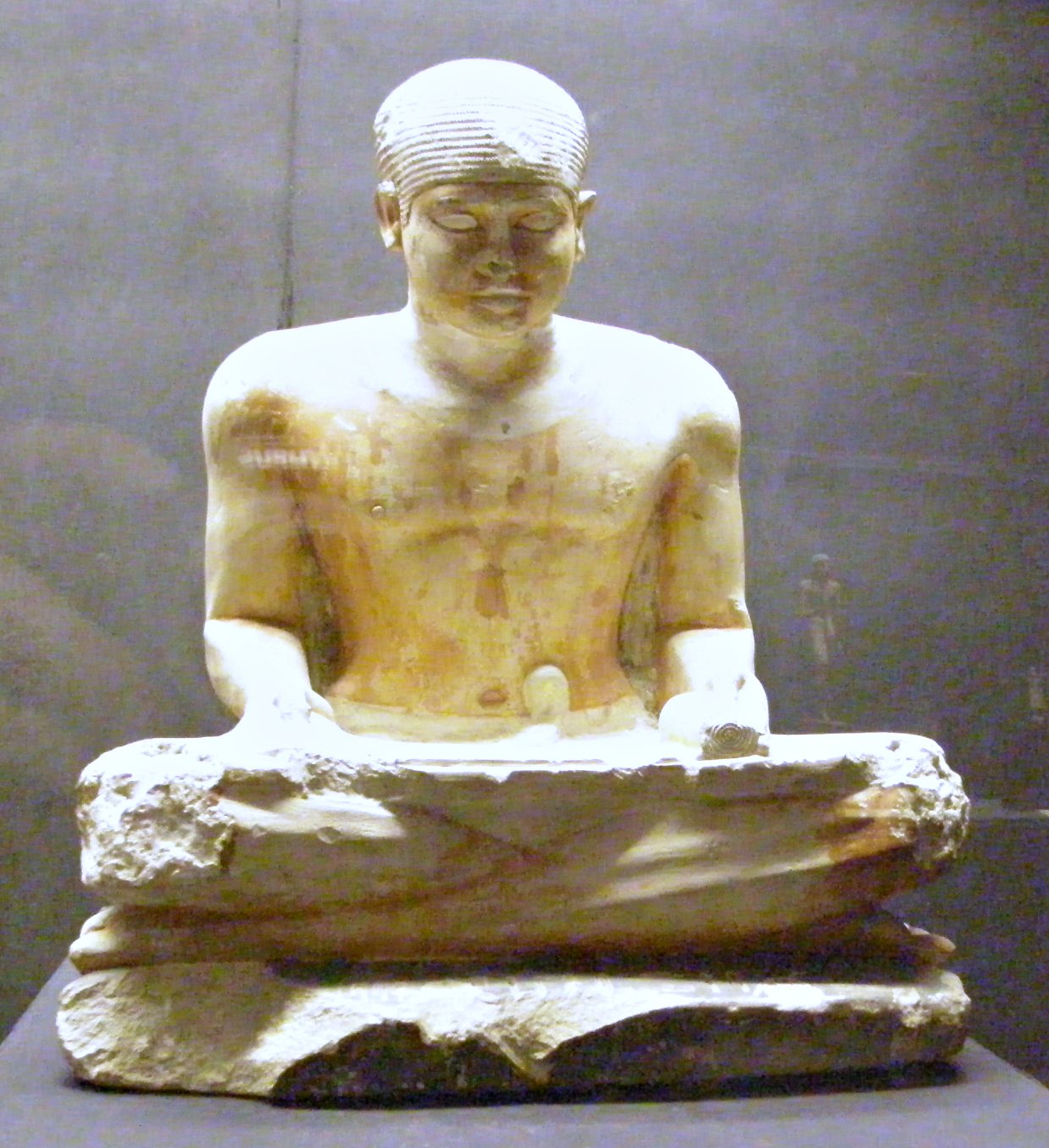
Statue of a scribe Ptahoshepses of the 5th Dynasty

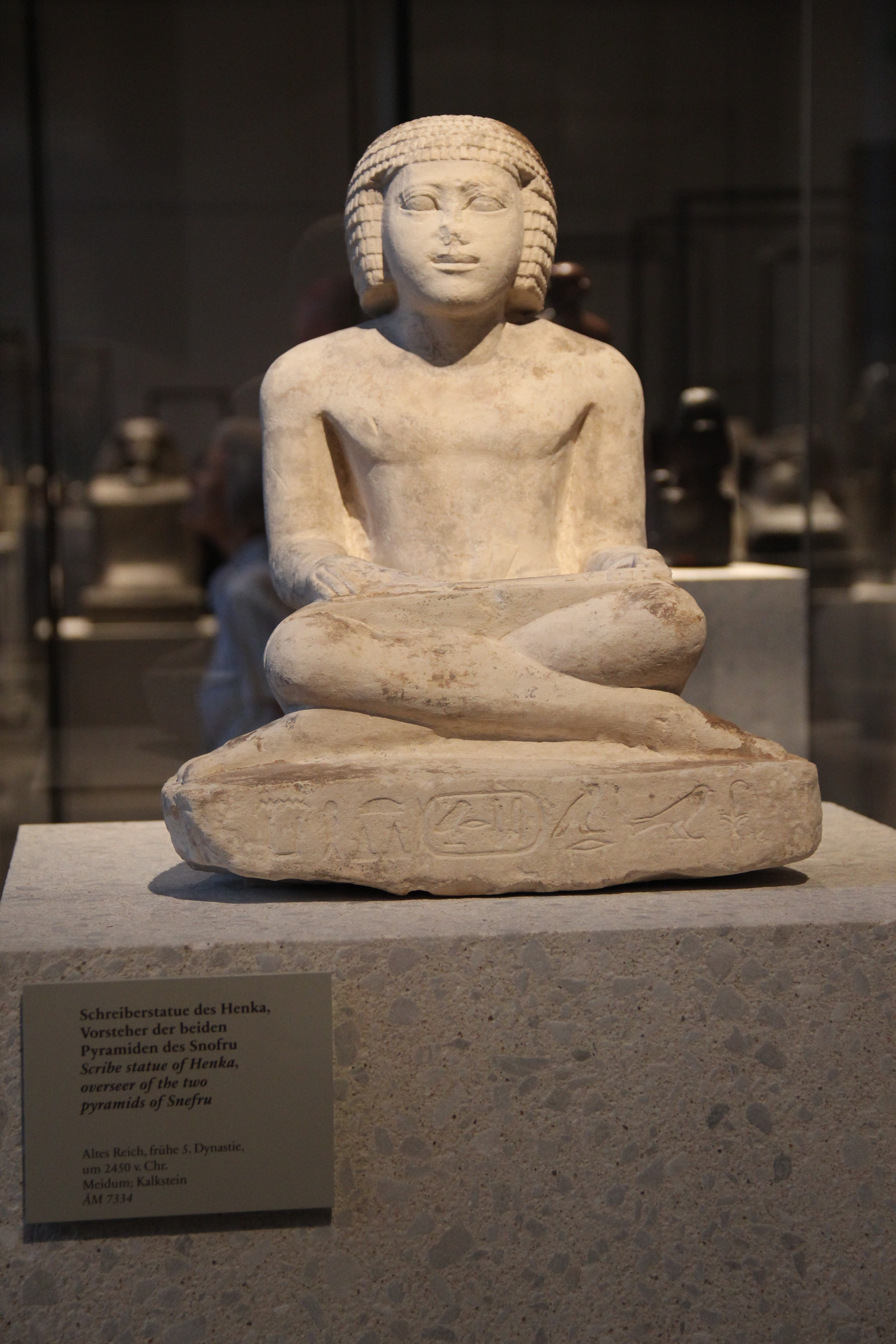
Statue of a scribe from Saqqara, early 5th Dynasty

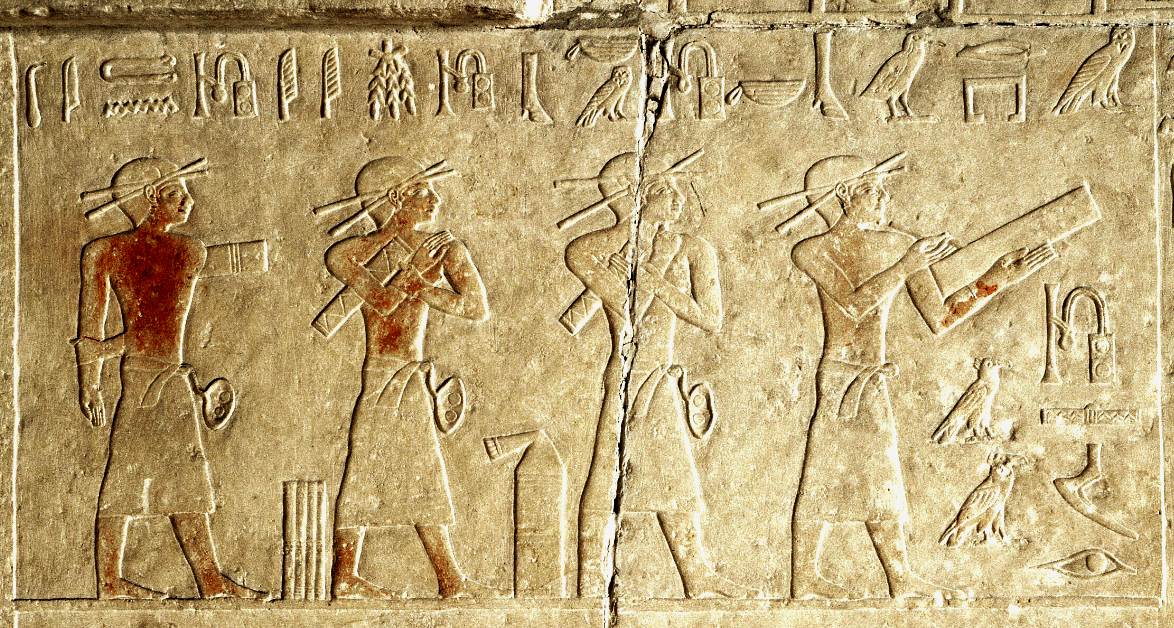
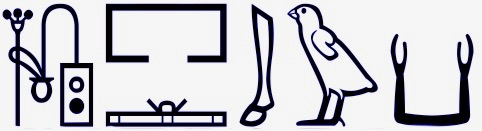
Mastaba of Keninisut, group of named scribes (⇐) Wahemka, Kaemwehen, Mesy, Tenti. (Note: Wahemka Chief Scribe and Administrator of the Prince’s Estate )

== See also ==
- List of ancient Egyptian papyri
