= Instructions of Kagemni =

Ancient Egyptian text

The Instructions of Kagemni is an ancient Egyptian instructional text of wisdom literature which belongs to the sebayt ('teaching') genre. Although the earliest evidence of its compilation dates to the Middle Kingdom of Egypt, its authorship has traditionally yet dubiously been attributed to Kagemni, a vizier who served during the reign of the Pharaoh Sneferu (r. 2613–2589 BC), founder of the Fourth Dynasty (belonging to the Old Kingdom).

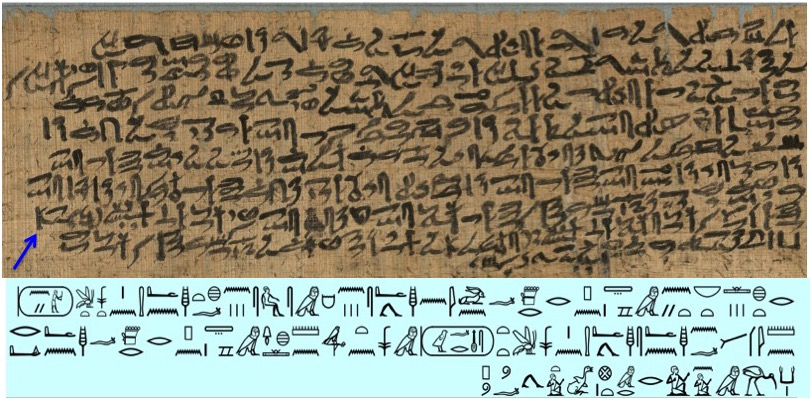
Thereupon the majesty of Huni king of Upper and Lower Egypt died and the majesty of Sneferu, king of Upper and Lower Egypt was established as a benevolent king over this entire land. Then Kagemni was appointed chief city governor and vizier.

== Dating ==
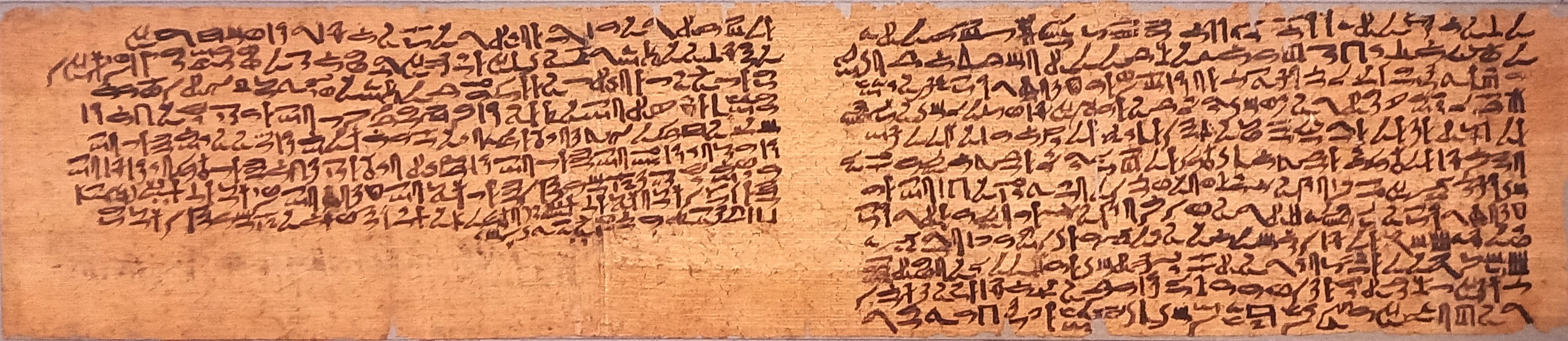
The complete hieratic text of the Instructions of Kagemni, as found on the Prisse Papyrus.

The earliest known source for the Instructions of Kagemni is the Prisse Papyrus. This text dates to the much later twelfth dynasty of the Middle Kingdom of Egypt (perhaps by the reign of Amenemhat II from 1929 BC to 1895 BC, or a bit later in the twelfth dynasty). It is written in the Middle Egyptian language and in an archaic style of cursive hieratic.

== Content ==
Only the end of this teaching text has survived; on the Prisse Papyrus, it is followed by the complete version of The Maxims of Ptahhotep. It is unknown how much of the text from its beginning is actually lost. Kagemni, who the text mentions as the vizier under Sneferu, is perhaps based on another vizier named Kagemni who lived during the sixth dynasty of Egypt. Kagemni is hinted as being the pupil rather than the teacher of virtues and morals in the text, and it has been proposed by scholars that his father was Kaire, a sage mentioned in the Ramesside-era Eulogy of Dead Writers (Papyrus Chester Beatty IV). Although the authorship of the text is attributed to Kagemni, it was common for ancient Egyptian wisdom texts to be falsely attributed to prestigious historical figures of much earlier times.

Written as a pragmatic guidebook of advice for the son of a vizier, the Instructions of Kagemni is similar to The Maxims of Ptahhotep. It differs from later teaching texts such as the Instruction of Amenemope, which emphasizes piety, and the Instructions of Amenemhat, which William Simpson (a professor emeritus of Egyptology at Yale University) described as a "political piece cast in instruction form." Kagemni advises that one should follow a path of modesty and moderation, which is contrasted with things to avoid: pride and gluttony. In Kagemni, the "silent man" who is modest, calm, and practices self-control is seen as the most virtuous; this type of person is later contrasted with his polar opposite, the "heated man", in Amenemope. According to Miriam Lichtheim, the virtuous "silent man" first described in Kagemni "was destined for a major role in Egyptian morality."
