= Ptahhotep =

Ancient Egyptian vizier

- Vizier of Egypt
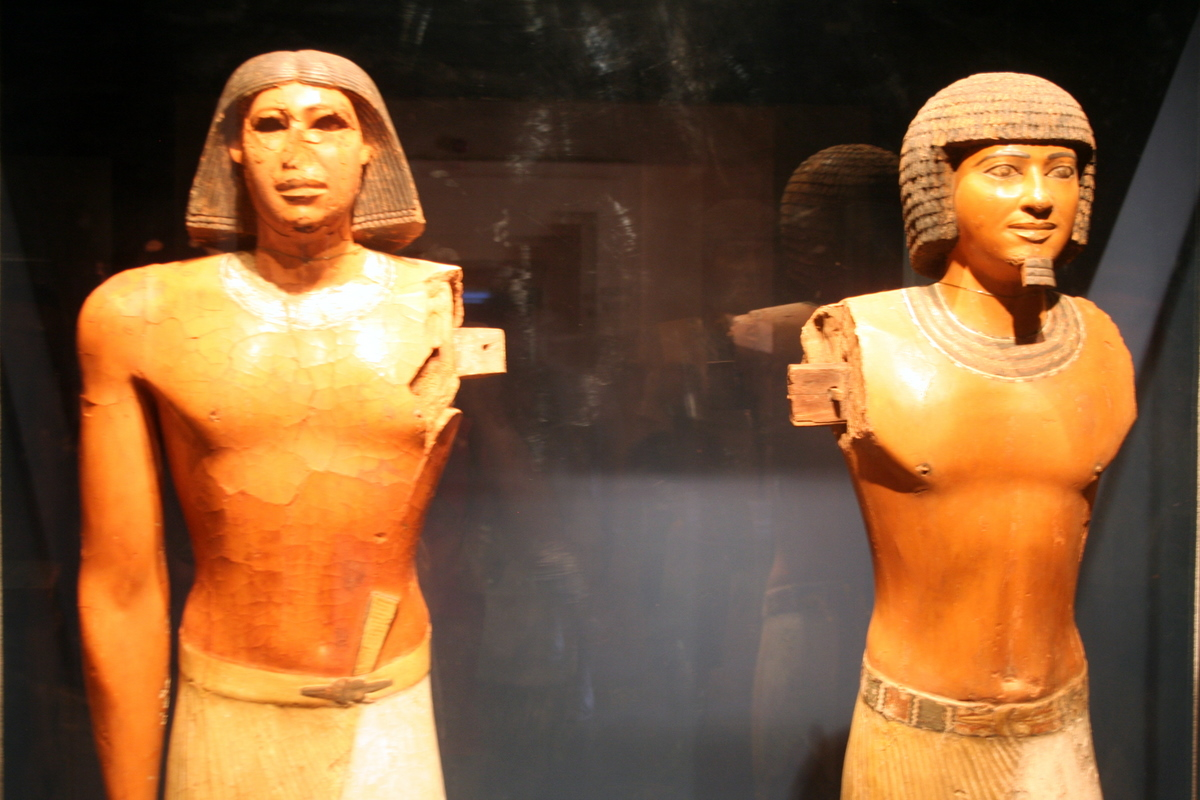
- Ptahhotep with two different wigs - Imhotep Museum in Saqqara
Egyptian name
p t H Htp t p A1
- Tenure: c. 2400 BC
- Pharaoh: Isesi
- Burial: Mastaba D62, Saqqara, Egypt
- Spouse: Khamerernebty
- Children: Akhethetep

Ptahhotep (Ancient Egyptian: ptḥ ḥtp "Peace of Ptah"; fl. c. 2400 BC), sometimes referred to as Ptahhotep I or Ptahhotpe, was a vizier during the reign of Djedkare Isesi in Egypt’s Fifth Dynasty. He is best known as the author of The Maxims of Ptahhotep, one of the earliest works of Egyptian wisdom literature, intended to instruct young men in proper conduct and ethical behavior.

Ptahhotep held the highest administrative office under the pharaoh, but his legacy extends beyond politics. He is regarded as one of the earliest recorded philosophers, whose teachings emphasized humility, justice, restraint in speech, and respect for social order (Maat). His writings were addressed initially to his son, Akhethetep, and later copied by scribes for centuries, ensuring their influence on Egyptian thought.

According to Will Durant in The Story of Civilization, Ptahhotep was the first known figure to caution against careless speech in public, anticipating themes later echoed by Greek philosophers such as Socrates and Plato. Durant interprets Ptahhotep’s advice as an early recognition that wisdom may be present among listeners, making prudence in discourse essential.

Ptahhotep was buried in Mastaba D62 at Saqqara. His spouse was Khamerernebty, and his son Akhethetep also held high office. Reliefs from his tomb, including depictions of Ptahhotep wearing different wigs, are preserved in the Imhotep Museum at Saqqara.

== Life ==
Ptahhotep was the city administrator and vizier (first minister) during the reign of King Djedkare Isesi in the Fifth Dynasty.

He had a son named Akhethetep, who was also a vizier. He and his descendants were buried at Saqqara.

Ptahhotep's tomb is located in a mastaba in North Saqqara (Mastaba D62). His grandson Ptahhotep Tjefi, who lived during the reign of Unas, was buried in the mastaba of his father (Mastaba 64). Their tomb is famous for its outstanding depictions. Next to the vizier's titles he held many other important positions, such as overseer of the treasury, overseer of scribes of the king's document, overseer of the double granary and overseer of all royal works.

== Mastaba ==
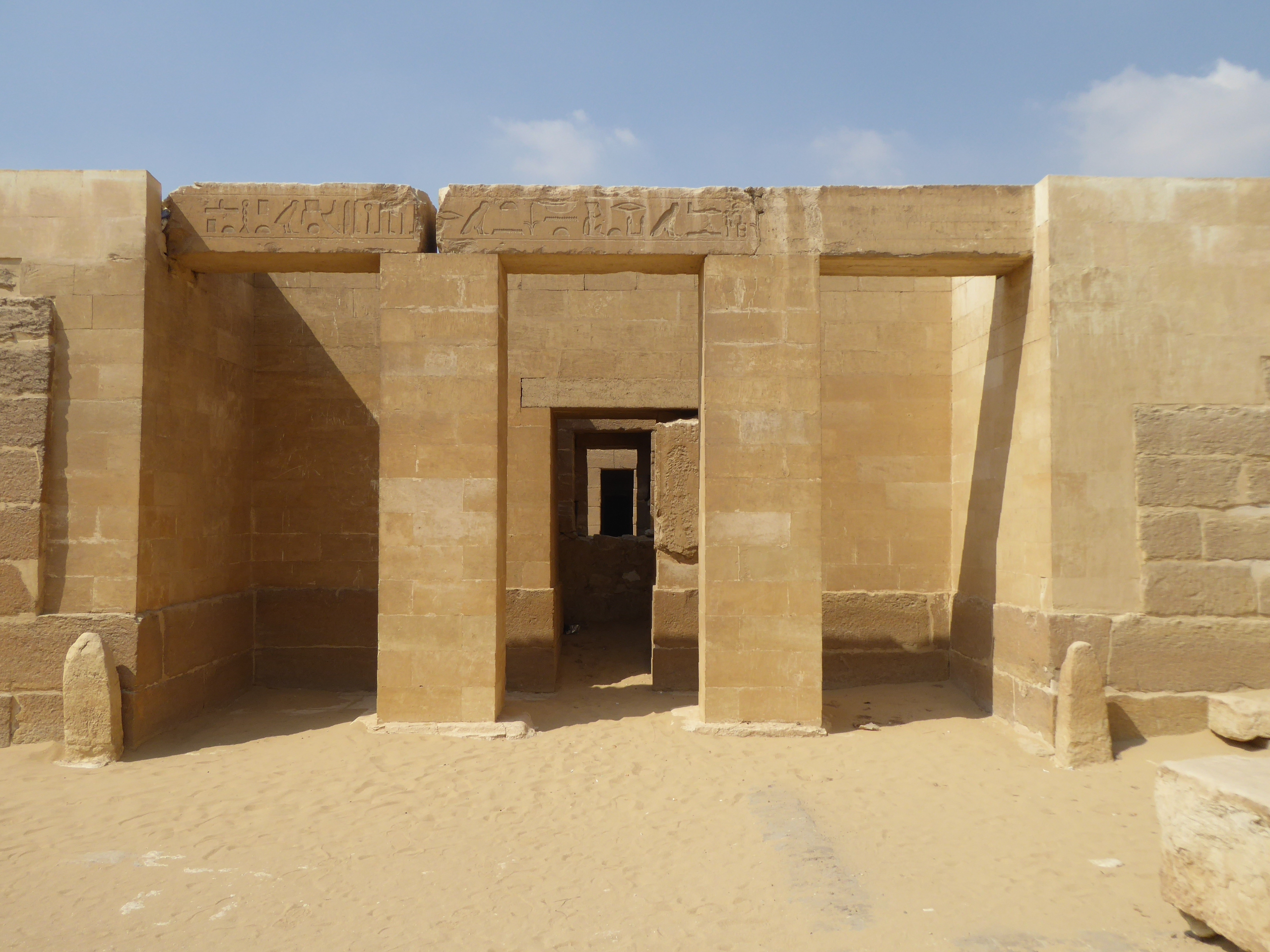
The mastaba tombs of Ptahhotep and his son Akhethetep

His mastaba is located at Saqqara. The entrance is on the South-east and decorated with two pillars. It follows a room with two further rooms on each side. The middle of the complex is occupied by a court with ten pillars. Going further north, several other rooms follow with one containing the false door of Ptahhotep and an offering table in front of it. Most walls of the mastaba are decorated with reliefs, but mostly only the lower parts of the scenes are preserved. They are mainly showing offerings bearers. The only family member preserved in the tomb decoration is the son Akhhotep. The name of the wife is not preserved.

== The Maxims of Ptahhotep ==
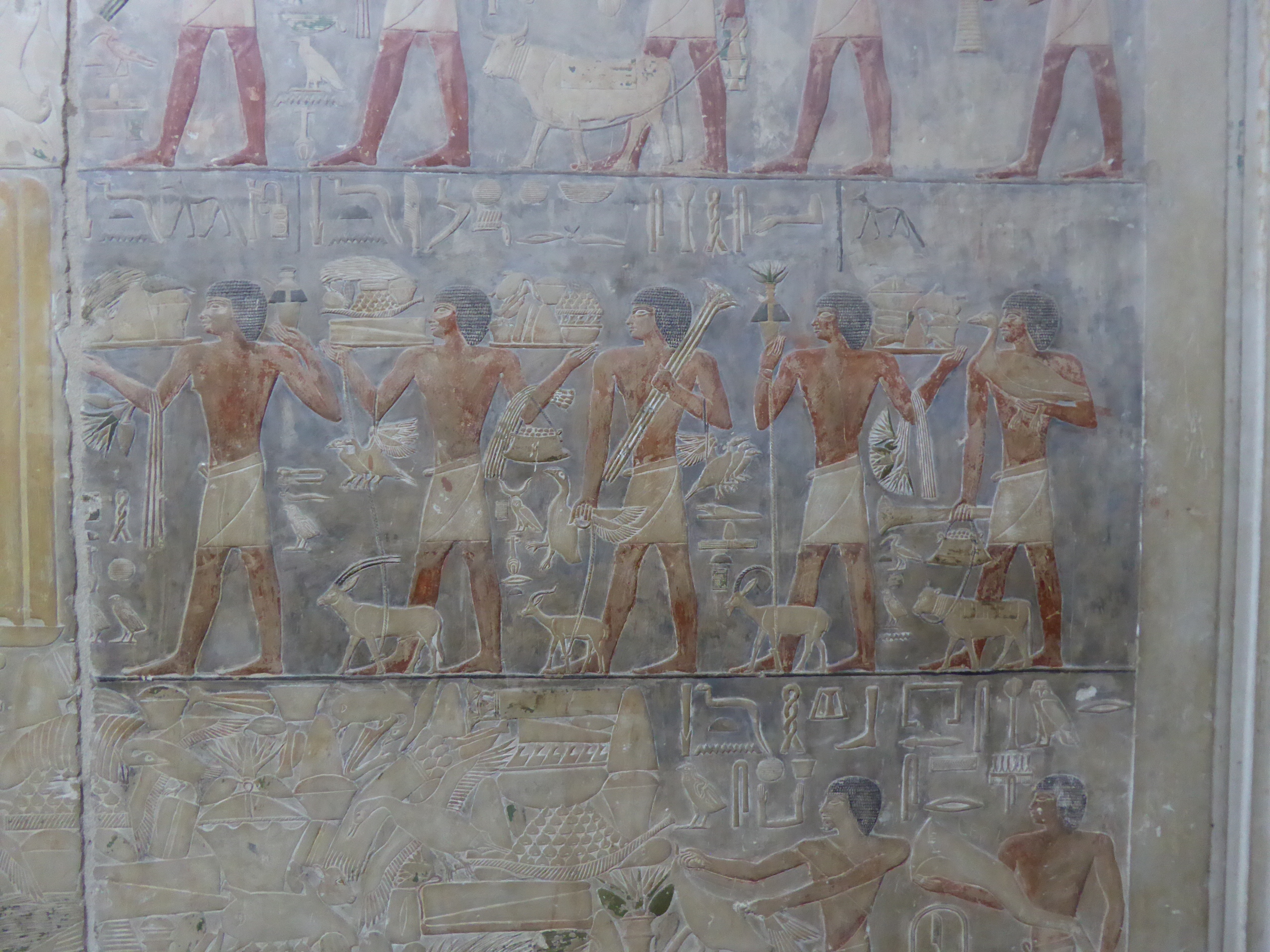
A Procession of offerings from Ptahhotep's mastaba tomb

For a long time it was believed by many scholars that Ptahhotep wrote the first book in history. His book was entitled The Maxims of Ptahhotep. As the Vizier, he wrote on a number of topics in his book that were derived from the central concept of Egyptian wisdom and literature which came from the goddess Maat. She was the daughter of the primordial and symbolized both cosmic order and social harmony. Ptahhotep’s instruction was written as advice to his people in the hopes of maintaining this said "social order". He wrote perspicacious advice covering topics from table manners and proper conduct for success in court circles to handy hints to the husband for preserving his wife’s beauty. Ptahhotep also wrote more social instructions such as ways to avoid argumentative persons and cultivate self-control.

Ptahhotep's grandson, Ptahhotep Tjefi, is traditionally credited with being the author of the collection of wise sayings known as The Maxims of Ptahhotep, whose opening lines attribute authorship to the vizier Ptahhotep: Instruction of the Mayor of the city, the Vizier Ptahhotep, under the Majesty of King Isesi. They take the form of advice and instructions from a father to his son and are said to have been assembled during the late Old Kingdom. However, their oldest surviving copies are written in Middle Egyptian dating to the late First Intermediate Period of the Middle Kingdom. Some scholars have argued that this means that the book was likely composed in the Middle Kingdom and that the authorship is fictional.

The 1906 translation by Battiscombe Gunn, published as part of the "Wisdom of the East" series, was made directly from the Prisse papyrus in Paris, rather than from copies, and is still in print.

The book is considered an early written example of ancient rhetorical communication. The Maxims of Ptahhotep reflected the religious landscape of the time by advocating for and practicing honesty and social harmony, aligned with the goddess Maat.

A manuscript copy, the Prisse Papyrus, is on display at the Louvre.

== Possible deification ==
It has been proposed by some Egyptologists such as John Baines that Ptahhotep was eventually deified and worshiped as a god. However, other Egyptologists such as Julia Troche have disputed this instead claiming that he was considered to be "distinguished dead" meaning that he was elevated to a higher status than others but not considered to be a full on deity.

== Bibliography ==
- Nicolas Grimal, A History of Ancient Egypt, Blackwell Publishing, 1992
- Mourad, Anna-Latifa (2015). The Tomb of Ptahhotep I. The Australian Centre for Egyptology, Report 37. Oxford: Aris and Phillips Ltd. ISBN 978-0-85668-851-5.
- Quirke, Stephen (2004). Egyptian Literature, 1800 BC: Questions and Readings. G. London: GHP. ISBN 978-0954721862.
- Strudwick, Nigel (1985). The Administration of Egypt in the Old Kingdom: The Highest Titles and Their Holders (PDF). Studies in Egyptology. London, Boston: KPI. ISBN 978-0-71-030107-9.
- El-Daly, Okasha (2005). Egyptology: The Missing Millennium. Ancient Egypt in Medieval Arabic Writings (PDF). London: UCL Press. ISBN 978-1-84472-063-7.
