= The Maxims of Ptahhotep =

Ancient Egyptian literary composition by Vizier Ptahhotep

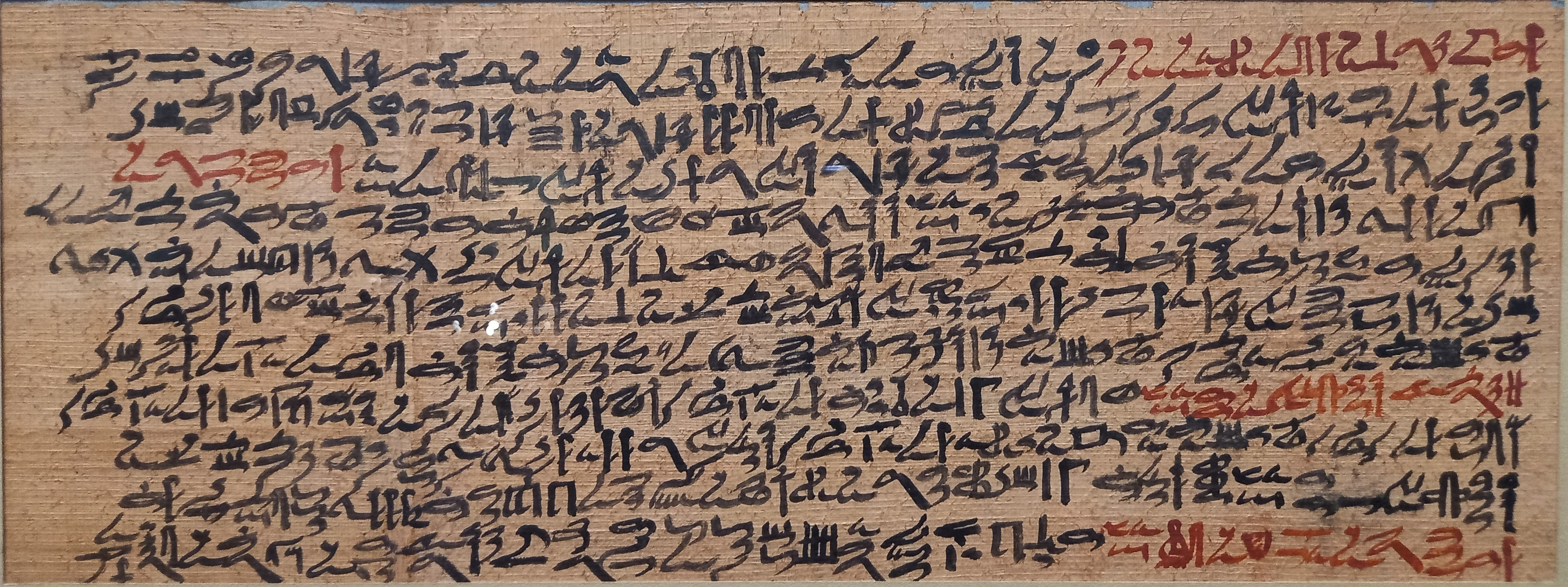
- Papyrus Prisse, manuscript "Egyptien 187", lines 75-123 of The Maxims of Ptahhotep. Bibliothèque nationale de France.
- Discovered: 1847; Luxor, Luxor Governorate, Egypt
- Discovered by: Émile Prisse d'Avennes

The Maxims of Ptahhotep or Instruction of Ptahhotep is an ancient Egyptian literary composition attributed to the Vizier Ptahhotep, who lived during the rule of King Djedkare Isesi of the Fifth Dynasty, though the text is usually considered by modern historians to have been composed later during the Middle Kingdom. The text was discovered in Thebes in 1847 by Egyptologist Émile Prisse d'Avennes. The Instructions of Ptahhotep are considered didactic wisdom literature belonging to the genre of sebayt. There are four copies of the Instructions, and the only complete version, the Prisse Papyrus, is located in the Bibliothèque Nationale in Paris. According to William Kelly Simpson, scholars tend to believe that the Instructions of Ptahhotep were originally composed during the Middle Kingdom (approximately 2040 to 1782 BC), specifically the Twelfth Dynasty. The earliest extant copies of the text were altered to make them understandable for the Egyptians of the New Kingdom. The text presents a very good picture of the general attitudes of that period. The Instructions of Ptahhotep addresses various virtues that are necessary to live a good life and how to live accordingly to Maat, which was an important part of the Egyptian culture.

== Summary ==
According to Simpson, the Vizier Ptahhotep was an elderly man of 96 years, ready to retire and was ready to pass down his position. The king approved of Ptahhotep's son succeeding him as vizier, but noted that the young cannot be born with wisdom and that they need the experience given by advanced age. Typically viziers were replaced by someone older that had experience, so the Vizier Ptahhotep wrote the instructions to his son to give him wisdom and advice that can only be attained through experience.

The Instructions consisted of various themes, one of which was leadership. For example, prose numbered 9,1:

If you are a leader, / Take responsibility in / the matters entrusted to you, / And you will accomplish things of note...

Prose 9,5 states:

If you are a man of authority, / Be patient when you are listening to the words of a petitioner; / Do not dismiss him until he has completely unburdened himself / Of what he had planned / to say to you.

This demonstrated the significance of growing old in ancient Egyptian society and the importance of having the wisdom to make the right decisions. The Instructions of Ptahhotep were texts that were constantly read and copied by students, scribes, and men that held a higher position.

The purpose of Instruction texts was to teach the youth how to live well and were usually written by elders. The main themes Ptahhotep focuses on are silence, timing, truthfulness, relationships, and manners. The text helps to reconstruct the social context of that time by describing the cultural space in which the writings were influential. In this way, this text can help a historian analyze the history of the period in which it was written.

Parkinson argued that ancient texts should be broken apart to properly understand the meaning of the text and to discern if any of it is accurate. Since most of the wisdom literature was written like poetry, some parts may be true and others fictional to attract the reader. Most of the wisdom writings were accepted by the readers for their choice of words, for the author's elite position held in society, and also based on the author's personal experiences.

There are four known copies of The Instructions of Ptahhotep, the first copy was written in the Old Kingdom and other copies were considered part of the Middle Kingdom. The Instructions from the original text were considered to originate from the Old Kingdom because it matched the social and intellectual thinking of that time period. The copy on the Prisse Papyrus, which is dated in the twelfth dynasty is considered as the original source. However, there are other Twelfth Dynasty versions and New Kingdom versions that omit some phrases, add phrases, and sometimes change the sequence of the words. The Prisse Papyrus contained three literary texts which were titled as "Instruction" or "Teaching", and the only complete text within this papyrus was the Instruction of Ptahhotep.

The Instruction of Ptahhotep was recognized by most Egyptologists as one of the most difficult Egyptian literary texts to translate. For example:

One knows a wise one because of his wisdom, / An official is at his good deed (?): his heart is in balance (?) with his tongue, his lips are accurate when he speaks...

The lines followed here by question marks are of uncertain meaning and subject to interpretation by each translator.

== Selected passages ==
"The Instruction of Ptahhotep"
Read by Arthur Krolman for LibriVox
Audio 00:31:45 (full text)

Quotations are taken from Christian Jacq, The Living Wisdom of Ancient Egypt.

- "Great is the Law (Maat)." (p. 24)
- "All conduct should be so straight that you can measure it with a plumb-line." (p. 27)
- "Injustice exists in abundance, but evil can never succeed in the long run." (p. 32)
- "Punish with principle, teach meaningfully. The act of stopping evil leads to the lasting establishment of virtue." (p. 32)
- "The human race never accomplishes anything. It's what God commands that gets done." (p. 41)
- "Those whom God guides do not go wrong. Those whose boat He takes away cannot cross." (p. 43)
- "Follow your heart all your life, do not commit excess with respect to what has been ordained." (p. 66)
- "If you work hard, and if growth takes place as it should in the fields, it is because God has placed abundance in your hands." (p. 74)
- "Do not gossip in your neighbourhood, because people respect the silent." (p. 74)
- "Listening benefits the listener." (p. 74)
- "If he who listens listens fully, then he who listens becomes he who understands." (p. 76)
- "He who listens becomes the master of what is profitable." (p. 76)
- "To listen is better than anything, thus is born perfect love." (p. 76)
- "God loves him who listens. He hates those who do not listen." (p. 76)
- "As for the ignorant man who does not listen, he accomplishes nothing. He equates knowledge with ignorance, the useless with the harmful. He does everything which is detestable, so people get angry with him each day." (p. 77)
- "A perfect word is hidden more deeply than precious stones. It is to be found near the servants working at the mill-stone." (p. 78)
- "Only speak when you have something worth saying." (p. 79)
- "As for you, teach your disciple the words of tradition. May he act as a model for the children of the great, that they may find in him the understanding and justice of every heart that speaks to him, since man is not born wise." (p. 85)
- "A woman with happy heart brings equilibrium." (p. 107)
- "Love your wife with passion." (p. 107)
- "As for those who end up continually lusting after women, none of their plans will succeed." (p. 108)
- "How wonderful is a son who obeys his father!" (p. 112)
- "How happy he is of whom it is said: 'A son is kind-natured when he knows how to listen.'" (p. 112)
- "Do not blame those who are childless, do not criticise them for not having any, and do not boast about having them yourself." (p. 113)
- "May your heart never be vain because of what you know. Take counsel from the ignorant as well as the wise..." (p. 119)
- "So do not place any confidence in your heart in the accumulation of riches, since everything that you have is a gift from God." (p. 126)
- "Think of living in peace with what you possess, and whatever the Gods choose to give will come of its own accord." (p. 127)
- "Do not repeat a slanderous rumour, do not listen to it." (p. 139)
- "He who has a great heart has a gift from God. He who obeys his stomach obeys the enemy." (p. 140)
- "Those who[m] the Gods guide cannot get lost. Those they forbid passage will not be able to cross the river of life." (p. 143)

== See also ==
- Ancient Egyptian philosophy
- African Philosophy
- Gerontocracy
- Instructions of Kagemni
