= Ancient Egyptian medicine =

Remedies from ancient Egypt

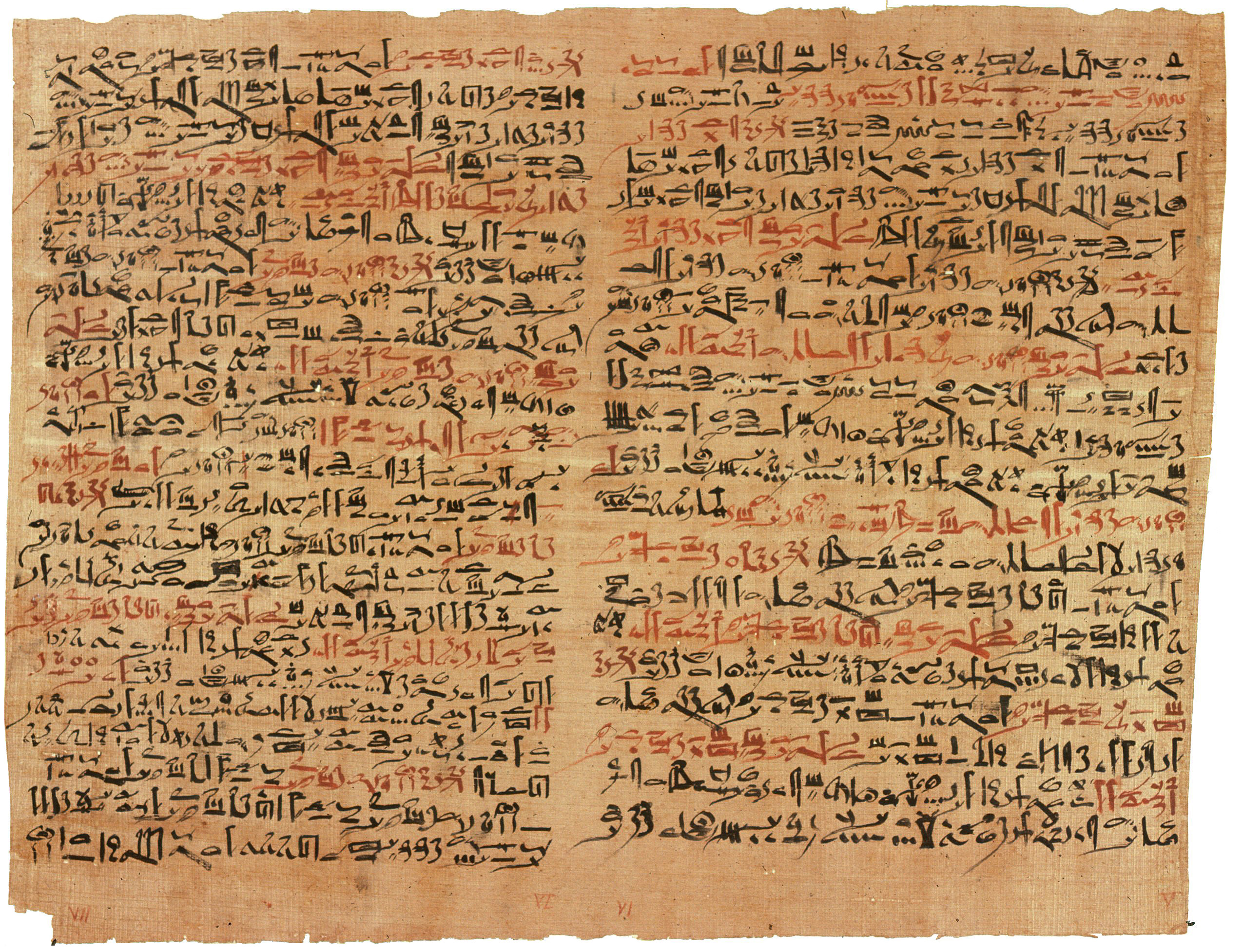
The Edwin Smith Papyrus documents ancient Egyptian medicine, including the diagnosis and treatment of injuries.

The medicine of the ancient Egyptians is some of the oldest documented. From the beginnings of the civilization in the late fourth millennium BC until the Persian invasion of 525 BC, Egyptian medical practice went largely unchanged and included simple non-invasive surgery, setting of bones, dentistry, and an extensive set of pharmacopoeia. Egyptian medical thought influenced later traditions, including the Greeks.

== History ==
=== Early dynastic period (pre c. 2700 BCE) ===
The Early Dynastic Period of Egypt displays a period of unity within Egypt. The Southern Upper region and Northern lower regions merged with a centralized government.

=== Old kingdom (c. 2700-2200 BCE) ===
Map of the Old and Middle Kingdom's of Ancient Egypt 2055 BCE–1650 BCE

The Old Kingdom was "the first golden age" of three periods in ancient Egypt. The Old Kingdom marks the building of the pyramids and expansion of civilization in the lower Nile Valley.

A medical revolution was underway with Imhotep (vizier to King Djoser) 's progression away from magic to science and logical explanations for medical conditions. Advancements showed strong progress during this time period, with developments in education, medical specialties, tools and anatomy. The first physician, Sekhet'enanch is mentioned and documented for healing Pharaoh Sahure of the Fifth Dynasty of a nasal disease c. 2480 BCE. Dentistry was a predominant field due to high amounts of sand in ancient Egyptians diet. The first documentation of dentistry in Egypt was the early dynastic period. Hesy-Ra, the first dentist known by name in history, was the chief of dentistry for Djoser.

=== Middle kingdom (2040-1782 BCE) ===
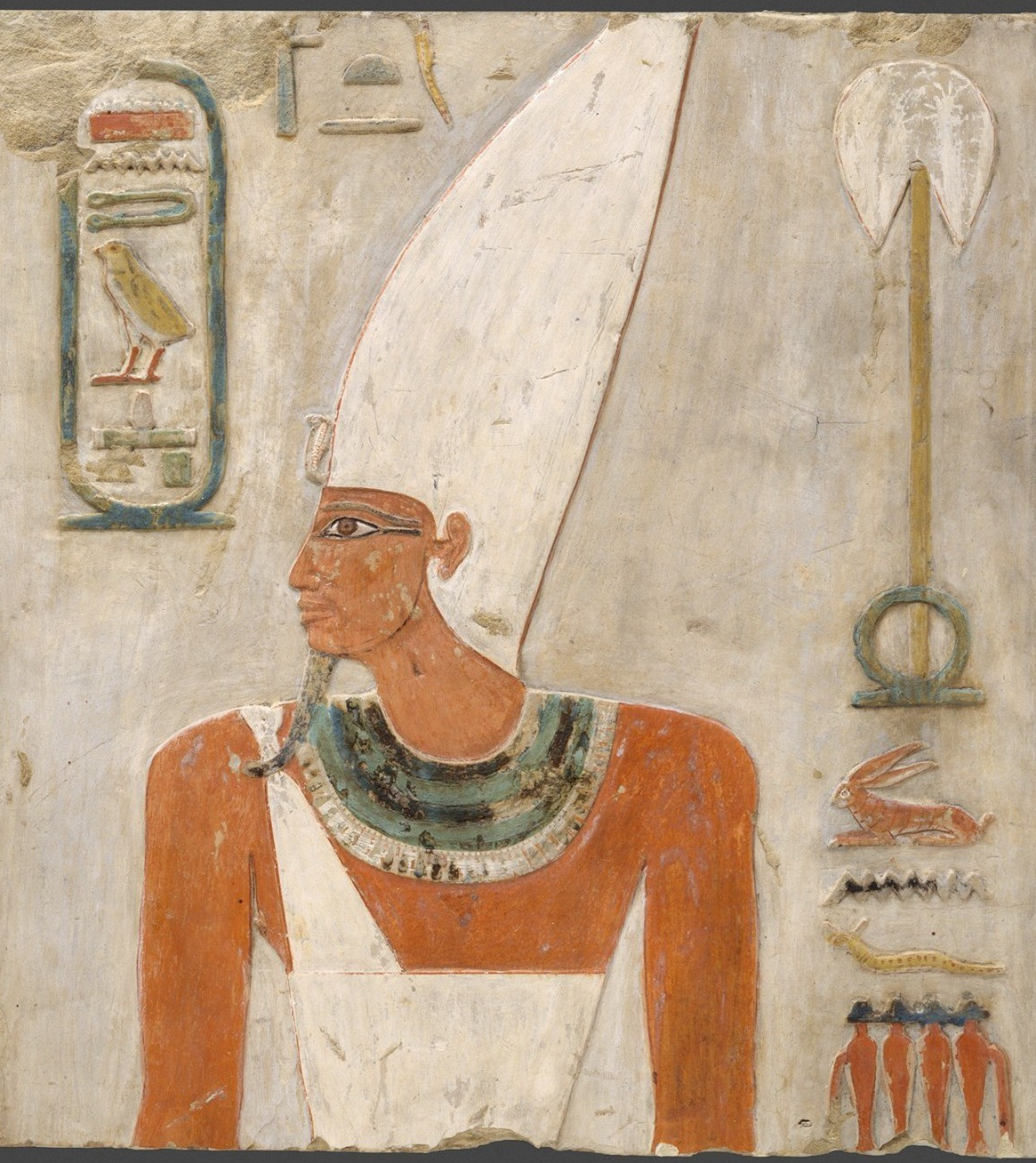
Mentuhotep II

The Middle Kingdom of Egypt reunified the political divisions seen in the First Intermediate Period, under the rule of Mentuhotep II. The period is known as "the second golden age" in ancient Egyptian history, following the Old Kingdom. The Kahun Gynaecological Papyrus was written around 1825 BCE, and is the oldest surviving treatise on gynecology, conception, and contraception. The veterinary papyrus of Kahun was written and included knowledge of animal healing. Medical procedures were advancing with remains of over 40 papyri found.

=== Second intermediate period (1782-1570 BCE) ===
The Second Intermediate Period is defined by division, with smaller dynasties holding power, lacking a strong centralized government as seen in the Middle and Old kingdoms. Migration of the Hyksos people, a Levant ethnic group occurred, and they established the 15th Dynasty. The dynasty was founded by Salitis. In 1600 BCE, the Edwin Smith Surgical Papyrus was written. The papyrus contained medical information gathered from over the past 500 years prior. With the first written descriptions of the brain, cranial sutures, and cerebrospinal fluid. The London Medical Papyrus was written during this period as well, focusing on pregnancy, Ophthalmology, and skin conditions.

=== New kingdom (1570-1069 BCE) ===
The New Kingdom marks the peak in ancient Egypt, with mass expansion into the Levant and Nubia, following the migration of the Hyksos during the second intermediate period. The Kingdom was coined as the third and final "Golden Age" of ancient Egyptian history. It was also known as the Ramessid period, after the eleven pharaohs named Ramesses. During this time period medicine grew rapidly with the most well known papyri being composed during the era. In 1550 BCE the Ebers Papyrus and Hearst papyrus were written. The two papyri consist of extensive knowledge on prescriptions and recipes used at the time, with the Eber's papyrus containing the first documented cases of diabetes in history. In 1350 BCE, the Brugsch Papyrus was written, documenting anatomy and pregnancy. In 1300 BCE, the London Medical Papyrus was written, which included 61 recipes. In 1200 BCE, the Chester Beatty Medical Papyrus was compiled, with mentions of headache and anorectal ailments remedies.

=== Third intermediate and late periods (1069-332 BCE) ===
The Third Intermediate Period (1077-664 BCE) arose from the death of Pharaoh Ramesses XI in 1077 BC. The Late Period followed, lasting from 656-332 BCE. Both periods were shaped by political instability and the loss of native Egyptian rule. The later period concluded with the conquests of Alexander the Great, creating the Ptolemaic dynasty. Medical specialities were highly specialized, as stated by Herodotus. There were distinct healers for the eyes, teeth, and internal disease. The Persian conquest in 525 in the Ptolemaic dynasty led to a gradual decline of ancient Egyptian medical practice and the "torch of knowledge" moved toward Greece.

In the Late Period, in Sais, a medical school known as the Temple of Neith was established. The temple was run by an unknown woman. Gynaecology and Obstetrics were the primary medical concentrations.

== Sources of information ==
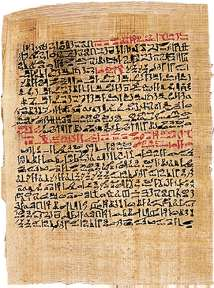
Ebers Papyrus treatment for cancer: recounting a "tumor against the god Xenus", it recommends "do thou nothing there against"

Until the 19th century, the main sources of information about ancient Egyptian medicine were writings from later in antiquity. The Greek historian Herodotus visited Egypt around 440 BC and wrote extensively of his observations of their medicinal practice. Pliny the Elder also wrote favorably of them in historical review. Hippocrates (the "father of medicine"), Herophilos, Erasistratus and later Galen studied at the temple of Amenhotep, and acknowledged the contribution of ancient Egyptian medicine to Greek medicine.

The decipherment of ancient Egyptian scripts in the early 19th century allowed the translation of ancient Egyptian inscriptions and papyri, including many related to medical matters (Egyptian medical papyri). The resultant interest in Egyptology in the 19th century led to the discovery of several sets of extensive ancient medical documents, including the Ebers papyrus, the Edwin Smith Papyrus, the Hearst Papyrus, the London Medical Papyrus and others.

The Edwin Smith Papyrus is a textbook on surgery and details anatomical observations and the "examination, diagnosis, treatment, and prognosis" of numerous ailments. It was probably written around 1600 BC, but is regarded as a copy of several earlier texts. It is thus viewed as a learning manual. Treatments consisted of ointments made from animal, vegetable or fruit substances or minerals. There is evidence of oral surgery being performed as early as the 4th Dynasty (c. 2650-2400BC).

The Ebers papyrus (c. 1550 BC) includes 877 prescriptions – as categorized by a modern editor – for a variety of ailments and illnesses, some of them involving magical remedies, for Egyptian beliefs regarding magic and medicine were often intertwined. It also contains documentation revealing awareness of tumors, along with instructions on tumor removal.

The Kahun Gynaecological Papyrus treats women's complaints, including problems with conception. Thirty four cases detailing diagnosis and treatment survive, some of them fragmentarily. Dating to 1800 BC, it is the oldest surviving medical text of any kind.

Other documents such as the Hearst papyrus (1450 BC), and Berlin Papyrus (1200 BC) also provide valuable insight into ancient Egyptian medicine.

Other information comes from the images that often adorn the walls of Egyptian tombs and the translation of the accompanying inscriptions. Advances in modern medical technology also contributed to the understanding of ancient Egyptian medicine. Paleopathologists were able to use X-rays and later CAT Scans to view the bones and organs of mummies. Electron microscopes, mass spectrometry and various forensic techniques allowed scientists unique glimpses of the state of health in Egypt 4000 years ago.

== Nutrition ==
The ancient Egyptians were at least partially aware of the importance of diet, both in balance and moderation. Owing to Egypt's great endowment of fertile land, food production was never a major issue, although no matter how bountiful the land, paupers and starvation still existed. The main crops for most of ancient Egyptian history were emmer wheat and barley. Consumed in the form of loaves which were produced in a variety of types through baking and fermentation, with yeast greatly enriching the nutritional value of the product, one farmer's crop could support an estimated twenty adults. Barley was also used in beer. Vegetables and fruits of many types were widely grown. Oil was produced from the linseed plant and there was a limited selection of spices and herbs. Meat (sheep, goats, pigs, wild game) was regularly available to at least the upper classes and fish were widely consumed, although there is evidence of prohibitions during certain periods against certain types of animal products; Herodotus wrote of the pig as being 'unclean'. Offerings to King Unas (c. 2494–2345 BC) were recorded as "...milk, three kinds of beer, five kinds of wine, ten loaves, four of bread, ten of cakes, four meats, different cuts, joints, roast, spleen, limb, breast, quail, goose, pigeon, figs, ten other fruits, three kinds of corn, barley, spelt, five kinds of oil, and fresh plants..."

It is clear that the Egyptian diet was not lacking for the upper classes and that even the lower classes may have had some selection (Nunn, 2002).

== Pharmacology ==
Like many civilizations in the past, the ancient Egyptians amply discovered the medicinal properties of plant life around them. The Edwin Smith Papyrus contains many recipes to help heal different ailments. One short section of the papyrus lays out five recipes: one dealing with problems women may have had, three on techniques for refining the complexion, and the fifth recipe for ailments of the colon. The ancient Egyptians were known to use honey as medicine, and the juices of pomegranates served as both an astringent and a delicacy. In the Ebers Papyrus, there are over 800 remedies; some were topical-like ointments and wrappings, others were oral medication such as pills and mouth rinses; still others were taken through inhalation. The recipes to cure constipation consisted of berries from the castor oil tree, Male Palm, and Gengent beans, just to name a few. One recipe that was to help headaches called for "inner-of-onion, fruit-of-the-am-tree, natron, setseft-seeds, bone-of-the-sword-fish, cooked, redfish, cooked, skull-of-crayfish, cooked, honey, and abra-ointment." Some of the recommended treatments made use of cannabis and incense. "Egyptian medicinal use of plants in antiquity is known to be extensive, with some 160 distinct plant products..." Amidst the many plant extracts and fruits, the Egyptians also used animal feces and even some metals as treatments. These prescriptions of antiquity were measured out by volume, not weight, which makes their prescription-making craft more like cooking than what pharmacists do today. While their treatments and herbal remedies seem almost boundless, they still included incantations along with some therapeutic remedies.

Egyptian drug therapy is considered ineffective by today's standards according to Michael D. Parkins, who says that 28% of 260 medical prescriptions in the Hearst Papyrus had ingredients which can be perceived "to have had activity towards the condition being treated" and another third supplied to any given disorder would produce a purgative effect on the gastrointestinal system.

== Practices ==
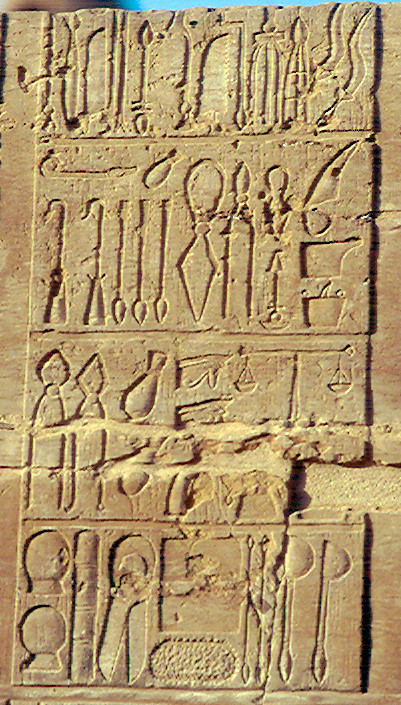
Ancient Egyptian medical instruments depicted in a Ptolemaic period inscription on the Temple of Kom Ombo.

Egyptians had some knowledge of human anatomy. For example, in the classic mummification process, mummifiers knew how to insert a long hooked implement through a nostril, breaking the thin bone of the braincase and removing the brain, but more commonly created a hole in the back of the head so that the brain and other fluids could drain from the foramen magnum. They also had a general idea that inner organs are in the body cavity. They removed the organs through a small incision in the left groin. Whether this knowledge was passed down to the practitioners is unknown; yet it did not seem to have had any impact on their medical theories.

Egyptian physicians were aware of the existence of the pulse and its connection to the heart. The author of the Smith Papyrus even had a vague idea of the cardiac system. However, he did not know about blood circulation and deemed it unimportant to distinguish between blood vessels, tendons, and nerves. They developed their theory of "channels" that carried air, water, and blood to the body by analogies with the River Nile; if it became blocked, crops became unhealthy. They applied this principle to the body: If a person was unwell, they would use laxatives to unblock the "channels".

The oldest written text mentioning enemas is the Ebers Papyrus and many medications were administered using enemas. One of the many types of medical specialists was an Iri, the Shepherd of the Anus.

Many of their medical practices were effective, such as the surgical procedures given in the Edwin Smith papyrus. Mostly, the physicians' advice for staying healthy was to wash and shave the body, including under the arms, to prevent infections. They also advised patients to look after their diet, and avoid foods such as raw fish or other animals considered to be unclean.

=== Surgery ===
The oldest metal (Bronze or copper) surgical tools in the world were discovered in the tomb of Qar. Surgery was a common practice among physicians as treatment for physical injuries. The Egyptian physicians recognized three categories of injuries; treatable, contestable, and untreatable ailments. Treatable ailments the surgeons would quickly set to right. Contestable ailments were those where the victim could presumably survive without treatment, so patients assumed to be in this category were observed and if they survived then surgical attempts could be made to fix the problem with them. They used knives, hooks, drills, forceps, pincers, scales, spoons, saws and a vase with burning incense.

Circumcision of males was the normal practice, as stated by Herodotus in his Histories. Though its performance as a procedure was rarely mentioned, the uncircumcised nature of other cultures was frequently noted, the uncircumcised nature of the Libyans was frequently referenced and military campaigns brought back uncircumcised phalli as trophies, which suggests novelty. However, other records describe initiates into the religious orders as involving circumcision which would imply that the practice was special and not widespread. The only known depiction of the procedure, in The Tomb of the Physician, burial place of Ankh-Mahor at Saqqara, shows adolescents or adults, not babies. Female circumcision may have been practiced, although the single reference to it in ancient texts may be a mistranslation.

Prosthetics, such as artificial toes and eyeballs, were also used; typically, they served little more than decorative purposes. In preparation for burial, missing body parts would be replaced; however, these do not appear as if they would have been useful, or even attachable, before death.

The extensive use of surgery, mummification practices, and autopsy as a religious exercise gave Egyptians a vast knowledge of the body's morphology, and even a considerable understanding of organ functions. The function of most major organs was correctly presumed—for example, blood was correctly guessed to be a transpiration medium for vitality and waste which is not too far from its actual role in carrying oxygen and removing carbon dioxide—with the exception of the heart and brain whose functions were switched.

=== Dentistry ===
Dentistry as an independent profession dated from the early 3rd millennium BC, although it may never have been prominent. The Egyptian diet was high in abrasives from sand left over from grinding grain and bits of rocks in which the way bread was prepared, and so the condition of their teeth was poor. Archaeologists have noted a steady decrease in severity and incidence of worn teeth throughout 4000 BC to 1000 AD, probably due to improved grain grinding techniques. All Egyptian remains have sets of teeth in quite poor states. Dental disease could even be fatal, such as for Djedmaatesankh, a musician from Thebes, who died around the age of thirty five from extensive dental disease and a large infected cyst. If an individual's teeth escaped being worn down, cavities were rare, due to the rarity of sweeteners. Dental treatment was ineffective and the best sufferers could hope for was the quick loss of an infected tooth. The Instruction of Ankhsheshonq contains the maxim "There is no tooth that rots yet stays in place". No records document the hastening of this process and no tools suited for the extraction of teeth have been found, though some remains show sign of forced tooth removal. Replacement teeth have been found, although it is not clear whether they are just post-mortem cosmetics. Extreme pain might have been medicated with opium.

== Doctors and other healers ==
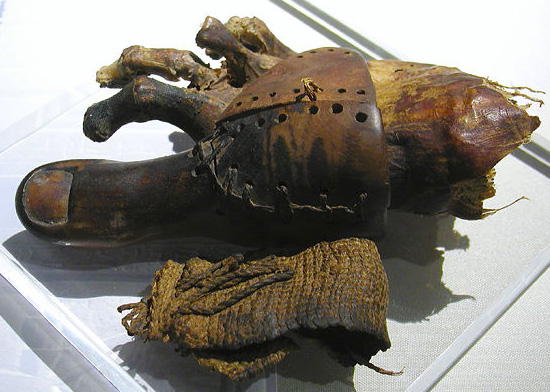
This wood and leather prosthetic toe was used by an amputee to facilitate walking

The ancient Egyptian word for doctor is "swnw". This title has a long history. The earliest recorded physician in the world, Hesy-Ra, practiced in ancient Egypt. He was "Chief of Dentists and Physicians" to King Djoser, who ruled in the 27th century BC. The lady Peseshet (2400 BC) may be the first recorded female doctor: she was possibly the mother of Akhethotep, and on a stela dedicated to her in his tomb she is referred to as imy-r swnwt, which has been translated as "Lady Overseer of the Lady Physicians" (swnwt is the feminine of swnw).

There were many ranks and specializations in the field of medicine. Royalty employed their own swnw, even their own specialists. There were inspectors of doctors, overseers and chief doctors. Known ancient Egyptian specialists are ophthalmologist, gastroenterologist, proctologist, dentist, "doctor who supervises butchers" and an unspecified "inspector of liquids". The ancient Egyptian term for proctologist, neru phuyt, literally translates as "shepherd of the anus". The latter title is already attested around 2200 BC by Irynachet.

Institutions, called (Per Ankh) or Houses of Life, are known to have been established in ancient Egypt since the 1st Dynasty and may have had medical functions, being at times associated in inscriptions with physicians, such as Peftauawyneit and Wedjahorresnet living in the middle of the 1st millennium BC. By the time of the 19th Dynasty their employees enjoyed such benefits as medical insurance, pensions and sick leave.

== Table of ancient Egyptian physicians ==
Physician Name	Other names	Kings service & Dating	Titles	Gender	Medical practice Site	Medical legacy	Non medical legacy	Burial site
Imhotep	Egyptian ỉỉ-m-ḥtp *jā-im-ḥātap meaning "the one who comes in peace, is with peace", Immutef, Im-hotep, or Ii-em-Hotep; called Imuthes (Ἰμούθης)	Djoser circa 2650–2600 BC	Chancellor of the King of Egypt, Doctor, First in line after the King of Upper Egypt, Administrator of the Great Palace, Hereditary nobleman, High Priest of Heliopolis, Builder, Chief Carpenter, Chief Sculptor, and Maker of Vases in Chief.	M	Memphis	Two thousand years after his death, Imhotep's status was raised to that of a deity of medicine and healing. Whether he was actually a physician is debated.	Imhotep was one of the chief officials of the Pharaoh Djoser and Egyptologists ascribe to him the designed the Pyramid of Djoser (the Step Pyramid) at Saqqara in Egypt in 2630–2611 BC. He may have been responsible for the first known use of columns to support a building. The Egyptian historian Manetho credited him with inventing the method of a stone-dressed building during Djoser's reign.	Probably Saqqara
Hesy-Ra	re-hesy, Hesire, Hesira	Djoser c. 2670 BC	Great one of the dentists	M	N/A	possibly the first known dentist in history	Wooden panel set of Hesy-Ra	buried in an elaborate tomb at Saqqara
Medunefer	N/A	Old Kingdom c. 2500 BC	leader of the eye physicians of the palace	M	N/A		Known from his mastaba at Giza	N/A
Penthu	N/A	Akhenaten c. 1350 BC, and later	The sealbearer of the King of Lower Egypt, the sole companion, the attendant of the Lord of the Two Lands, the favorite of the good god, king's scribe, the king's subordinate, First servant of the Aten in the mansion of the Aten in Akhetaten, Chief of physicians, and chamberlain	M	Aten	Chief physician to Akhenaten, but may have survived the upheavals of the end of the Amarna period, and served under Ay, after being Vizier under Tutankhamun	Vizier to king	Amarna Tomb 5
Peseshet	Merit-Ptah	Fourth Dynasty of Egypt c. 2500 BC	lady overseer of the female physicians	F	N/A	Midwife (?), earliest known female physician in ancient Egypt	A personal stela at her son Akhethetep's tomb	N/A
Qar	N/A	Sixth Dynasty of Egypt c. 2350–2180 BC	The royal physician	M	N/A	The oldest Bronze or copper surgical tool in the world	His mummy in the limestone sarcophagus and 22 bronze statues of different deities and statuette of Imhotep the physician	He died at the age of fifty years and was buried in his tomb at Saqqara, which was re-used several times
Psamtikseneb	may King Psamtik be healthy	Twenty-sixth Dynasty of Egypt c. 664–525 BC	The Head of Physicians, the scorpion charmer, chief physician and chief dentist (wr ἰbḥ) of Psamtik Seneb, an admiral of the royal fleet	M	N/A	N/A	Ushabti of the Head of Physician Psamtik-seneb, photo in relief of Ankh-ef-en-Sekhmet Entertained by a Harpist	His tomb discovered at Heliopolis in 1931/32 AD
Udjahorresnet	Wedjahor-Resne or Udjahor-Resnet	from Amasis to Darius I	The Head of Physicians, supervisor of the medical schools – the 'Houses of life'; the prince, the royal chancellor, the unique companion, the prophet of the one who lives with them, the chief physician, the one truly known and loved by the king, the scribe, the inspector of the scribes of the dedet-court, the first among the great scribes of the prison, the director of the palace, the admiral of the royal navy of the king of Upper and Lower Egypt Khnemibre [Amasis], the admiral of the royal navy of the king of Upper and Lower Egypt, Ankhkaenre [Psammetichus III], head of the province of Sais Peftuôneit	M	N/A	Wedjahor-Resne composed Cambyses' new royal name, Mesuti-Ra ('born of Ra')	His titles are preserved on a beautiful statue (Vatican inv.196)	His tomb has been discovered in 1995 at Abusir
Harsiese son of Ramose	00	from Amasis to Darius I	The Head of Physicians, chief physician of Upper and Lower Egypt, leader of Aegean foreign (troops) and admiral of the royal fleet	M	N/A	N/A	mentioned in Instruction of Ankhsheshonq (P. BM 10508) as the source of the plot that led to the imprisonment of the unfortunate Ankhsheshonq (P. BM. 10508 col. 1 to 3)	Saqqara
Peftuaneith	Payeftjauemawyneith	Twenty-sixth Dynasty during the reign of Amasis	The Chief physician	M	N/A	N/A	A naophorous statue of the chief physician Petuaneith (Louvre A 93), he restored the temple of Abydos	N/A
Iwti	N/A	19th dynasty c. 2500 BC	The Chief physician	M	Most likely worked or trained in Memphis (inscriptions on statue indicate sacrificial relations to Memphite city god)	N/A	A statue of him is displayed at the museum of Egyptology in Leiden	N/A
Djehutyemheb	N/A	Ramesses II	The wise scribe and physician	M	Khonsu temple?	N/A	N/A	N/A
Peftjauemauineith	N/A	transitional period between Apries and Amasis II	the chief physician of Upper and Lower Egypt (wr swnw n sma MHw)	M	N/A	N/A	N/A	N/A

== Table of ancient Egyptian medical papyri ==
Papyrus Name	Other names	Dating	Language	Medical specialties	Contents	Scribe/Author	Date & place of discovery	place of preserving	size	image
Edwin Smith Papyrus	Edwin Smith Surgical Papyrus	Dates to Dynasties 16–17 of the Second Intermediate Period in ancient Egypt, c. 1500 BC, but believed to be a copy from Old Kingdom, 3000–2500 BC	Hieratic	The oldest known surgical treatise on trauma	The vast majority of the papyrus is concerned with trauma and surgery, with short sections on gynaecology and cosmetics on the verso. On the recto side, there are 48 cases of injury. The verso side consists of eight magic spells and five prescriptions. The oldest known surgical treatise on trauma	Attributed by some to Imhotep	Luxor, Egypt before 1862	New York Academy of Medicine, New York City	A scroll 4.68 m in length. The recto (front side) has 377 lines in 17 columns, while the verso (backside) has 92 lines in five columns	
Ebers Papyrus	Papyrus Ebers	c. 1550 BC but believed to be a copy from earlier texts of 3400 BC	Hieratic	Medicine, Obestitrics & gynecology & Surgery	The scroll contains some 700 magical formulas and remedies, chapters on contraception, diagnosis of pregnancy and other gynecological matters, intestinal disease and parasites, eye and skin problems, dentistry and the surgical treatment of abscesses and tumors, bone-setting and burns	N/A	Assassif district of the Theban necropolis in 1873-74	Leipzig University Library, Leipzig	A 110-page scroll, which is about 20 meters long	
Kahun Gynaecological Papyrus	Kahun Papyrus, Kahun Medical Papyrus, or UC 32057	c. 1825 BC	Hieratic	Medicine, Obestitrics & gynecology, pediatrics and veterinary medicine	The text is divided into thirty-four sections that deals with women's health—gynaecological diseases, fertility, pregnancy, contraception, etc. The later Berlin Papyrus and the Ramesseum medical papyri cover much of the same ground, often giving identical prescriptions	N/A	El-Lahun by Flinders Petrie in 1889	University College London, London	2 gynecologic papyri & 1 veterinary payrus	
Ramesseum medical papyri	Ramesseum medical papyri parts III, IV, and V	18th century BC	Hieroglyphic & Hieratic	Medicine, gynecology, ophthalmology, rheumatology & pediatrics	A collection of ancient Egyptian medical documents in parts III, IV, and V, and written in vertical columns that mainly dealt with ailments, diseases, the structure of the body, and supposed remedies used to heal these afflictions. namely ophthalmologic ailments, gynaecology, muscles, tendons, and diseases of children	N/A	Ramesseum temple	Ashmolean Museum, Oxford	3 papyri (parts III, IV, V)	
Hearst papyrus	Hearst Medical Papyrus	18th Dynasty of Egypt, around time of Tuthmosis III c. 0000 but believed to have been composed earlier, during the Middle Kingdom, around 2000 BC	Hieratic	Urology, Medicine and bites	260 paragraphs on 18 columns in 18 pages of medical prescriptions for problems of urinary system, blood, hair, and bites	N/A	Discovered by an Egyptian peasant of village of Der-el-Ballas before 1901	Bancroft Library, University of California, Berkeley	18 pages	
London Medical Papyrus	BM EA 10059	19th dynasty 1300 BC or c. 1629–1628 BC	Hieratic	Skin complaints, eye complaints, bleeding, miscarriage and burns	61 recipes, of which 25 are classified as medical the remainder are of magic	N/A	Thebes, 1860	Royal Institution, London	N/A	
Papyrus Berlin 3038	Brugsch Papyrus, the Greater Berlin Papyrus	19th dynasty, and dated c. 1350–1200 BC	Hieratic?	Medical	Discussing general medical cases and bears a great similarity to the Ebers papyrus. Some historians believe that this papyrus was used by Galen in his writings	N/A	Discovered by an Egyptian in Saqqara before 1827	Berlin Museum, Berlin	24 pages (21 to the front and 3 on the back)	N/A
Carlsberg papyrus	N/A	Between the 19th and 20th dynasties, New Kingdom; its style relates it to the 12th dynasty. Some fragments date back to c. 2000 BC, others—the Tebtunis manuscripts—date back to c. 1st century AD	Hieratic, Demotic. Hieroglyphs and in Greek	Obestitrics & gynecology, Medicine, Pediatrics & ophthalmology	The structure of the papyrus bears great resemblance to that of the Kahun and Berlin papyri.	N/A	Discovered in Luxor Temple in the cellar	Egyptological Institute of the University of Copenhagen	Approximately 6 meters	Papyri text of the Carlsberg collection
Chester Beatty Medical Papyrus	Chester Beatty Papyri, Papyrus VI of the Chester Beatty Papyri 46 (Papyrus no. 10686, British Museum), Chester Beatty V BM 10685, VI BM 10686, VII BM 10687, VIII BM 10688, XV BM 10695	Dated around 1200 BC	Hieratic	Headache, and Anorectal disorders	Magic spells and medical recipes for headache & anorectal disease	N/A	Started off as a private collection by the scribe Qen-her-khepeshef in the 19th Dynasty and passed on down through his family until they were placed in a tomb	British Museum	Approximately 236 pages ranging from sizes of 14 by 24.2 cm to 18 by 33 cm	
Brooklyn Medical Papyrus	47.218.48 och 47.218.85, also known as the Brooklyn Medical Papyrus	A collection of papyri which belong to the end of the 30th dynasty, dated to around 450 BC, or the beginning of the Ptolemaic Period. However, it is written with the Middle Kingdom style which could suggest its origin might be from the Thirteenth dynasty of Egypt	Hieratic	Deals only with snakes and scorpion bites, and the formulae to drive out the poison of such animals	It speaks about remedies to drive out poison from snakes, scorpions and tarantulas. The style of these remedies relates to that of the Ebers papyrus	N/A	Might originate from a temple at ancient Heliopolis, discovered before 1885	Brooklyn Museum in New York	A scroll of papyrus divided into two parts with some parts missing, its total length is estimated to 175 × 27 cm	
Erman Papyrus	Given with the Westcar papyrus to Berlin museum	Early New Kingdom's 18th Dynasty (1525-1400 BCE)	Hieratic	Medicine, Magic & Anatomy	Holds some medical formulae and a list of anatomic names (body and viscera), approximately 20 magical formulae, childbirth and infant protection medicine and magic discussed	N/A	Before 1837	Berlin Museum	Fifteen preserved columns with 6 glued sheets 240 cm x 15.7 cm	N/A
Leiden Papyrus	Rijksmuseum van Oudheden, Leiden 1343–1345	18th–19th dynasties	Hieratic	Medicine, Magic	Magical texts, poems of the plagues that followed after the Exodus from Egypt	Possibly Ipuwer but highly debated by scholars	Discovered by traders who sold it to Giovanni Anastasi who later sold it to the Dutch Government in 1928	Rijksmuseum van Oudheden, Leiden	378 cm x 18 cm	

== See also ==
- Ancient Greek medicine
- Byzantine medicine
- Medicine in ancient Rome
- History of medicine
- Unani
- Disability in Ancient Egypt
