= Egyptian medical papyri =

Ancient Egyptian text

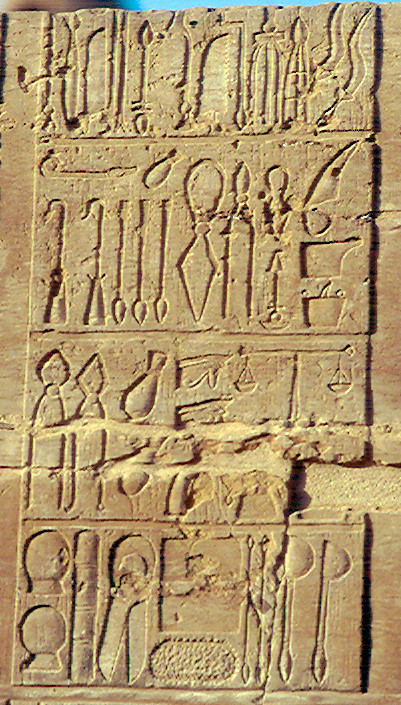
Ancient medical instruments, Temple of Kom Ombo.

Egyptian medical papyri are ancient Egyptian texts written on papyrus which permit a glimpse at medical procedures and practices in ancient Egypt. These papyri give details on disease, diagnosis, and remedies of disease, which include herbal remedies, surgery, and magical incantations. Many of these papyri have been lost due to grave robbery. The largest study of the medical papyri to date has been undertaken by Humboldt University of Berlin and was titled Medizin der alten Ägypter ("Medicine of ancient Egypt").

Early Egyptian medicine was based mostly on a mixture of magic and religious spells. Most commonly "cured" by use of amulets or magical spells, the illnesses were thought to be caused by spiteful behavior or actions. Afterwards, doctors performed various medical treatments if necessary. The instructions for these medical rituals were later inscribed on papyrus scrolls by the priests performing the actions.

== Discovery and study of papyri ==
These ancient Egyptian texts were written long before their discovery and publication, and many are now owned either privately or preserved at universities all over the world. The first papyri to be discovered would be the Berlin Papyrus, discovered and subsequently published by Heinrich Brugsch in 1863. Brugsch was the first to study this papyrus, and a translation did not become available until 1909, published by Walter Wreszinski. In 1875, the Ebers Papyrus, covering a broad concept of general pathology was published. Some 20 years later, the Kahun Papyri were published by F.L. Griffith in 1898, and these were the first published papyri about the practice of gynecology. The Ramesseum Papyrus was discovered in the year 1898 at the bottom of a tomb-shaft, and was then left untouched until a few years later. In 1900, Percy Newberry started the process of unrolling and preserving the Ramesseum Papyri so that it can be further studied and stored without threat of further wear and tear. In 1905, the Hearst Papyrus was published by G.A. Reisner. Subsequently, the publication of these papyri inspired Walter Wreszinski to attempt a production of overviews of medicine in ancient Egypt. He first published his first of three parts in 1909, Die Medizin der Alten Aegypter, and the following two publications in 1912 and 1913. These were primarily translations with some commentary overviewing the Egyptian medical processes. It wasn't until 1932 that when Warren R Dawson first published an analytical breakdown of medical texts and confusing words and phrases therein that it was discovered some things had been incorrectly translated. Dawson first starts to challenge the previous findings of Reisner and comes to some many conclusions about the meanings of multiple words, and discovers that some of the meanings had been wrong, and corrects them.

There is curiosity as to whether or not the medical papyri was more progressive for the world of medicine at the time because of the reliance on non-physical treatments they still relied on. Spells were the earliest forms of medical treatments and believed to be effective before other methods were revealed. With this information it seems logical that physicians and those in the medical field who practiced medicine before surgery and prescription treatments were found effective could not completely abandon the earliest forms of treatments, such as spiritual or magical, but this does not entail a regressive approach to medicine. Some treatments did not require the assistance of alternative methods because they were found to be treated with only physical treatments, such as surgery, which is the focus of the Edwin Smith Papyrus.

== Main medical papyri ==
=== Kahun Papyrus ===
Dated to circa 1800 BCE, the Kahun Gynaecological Papyrus is the oldest known medical text in Egypt. It was found at El-Lahun by Flinders Petrie in 1889, first translated by F. Ll. Griffith in 1893, and published in The Petrie Papyri: Hieratic Papyri from Kahun and Gurob. The papyrus contains 35 separate paragraphs relating to women's health, such as gynaecological diseases, fertility, pregnancy, and contraception. It does not describe surgery. Kahun papyri is efficiently divided into three different sections. These sections are there to provide a guideline on the interaction between patient and physician. The first being what are the symptoms, the second being how the physician should consult the patient along with diagnoses, and lastly a treatment is offered or advised.

=== Ramesseum Papyri ===
The Ramesseum medical papyri consist of 17 individual papyri that were found in the great temple of the Ramesseum. The Papyri was buried under a brick magazine discovered by Flinders Petrie and James Quibell in 1895. They concentrate on the eyes, gynecology, paediatrics, muscles and tendons.

=== Edwin Smith Papyrus ===
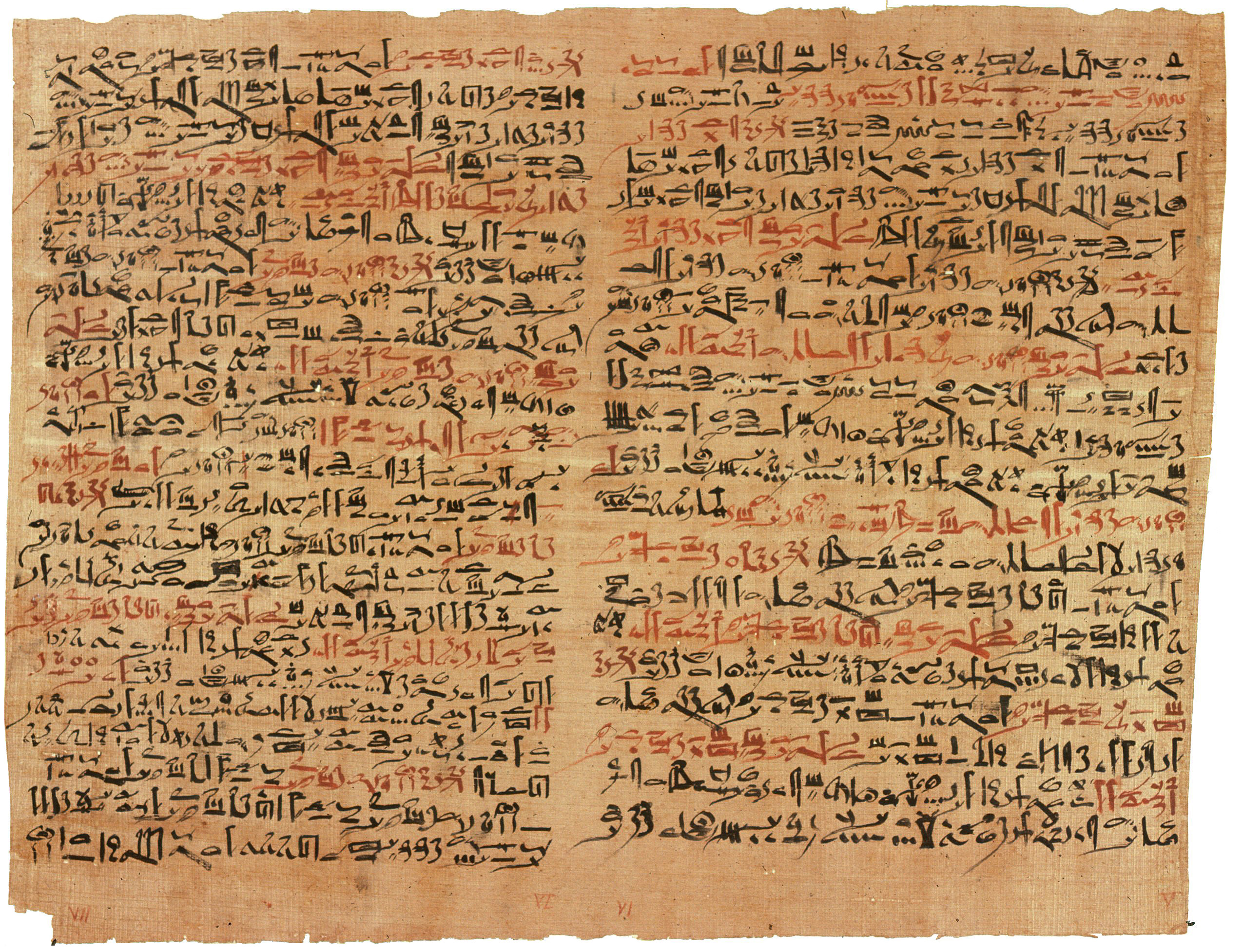
Plates vi & vii of the Edwin Smith Papyrus (around the 17th century BC), among the earliest medical texts

Dated to circa 1600 BCE, the Edwin Smith Papyrus is the only surviving copy of part of an ancient Egyptian textbook on trauma surgery. The Edwin Smith papyri is of a great deal of importance because it changed medical practices, people were now learning that they could do surgery, whereas before they relied on more religious healing practices. The papyrus takes its name from the Egyptian archaeologist Edwin Smith, who purchased it in the 1860s. The most detailed and sophisticated of the extant medical papyri, it is also the world's oldest surgical text. Written in the hieratic script of the ancient Egyptian language, it is thought to be based on material from a thousand years earlier. The document consists of 22 pages (17 pages on the recto, and 5 pages on the verso). 48 cases of trauma are examined, each with a description of the physical examination, diagnosis, treatment, and prognosis. An important aspect of the text is that it shows that the heart, liver, spleen, kidneys, ureters, and bladder were all known to the Egyptians, along with the fact that the blood vessels were connected to the heart. The entire translation is available online.

=== Ebers Papyrus ===
The Ebers Papyrus was also purchased by Edwin Smith in 1862. It takes its name from Georg Ebers who purchased the papyrus in 1872. The papyrus dates to around 1550BC and covers 110 pages, making it the lengthiest of the medical papyri. The papyrus covers many different topics including; dermatology, digestive diseases, traumatic diseases, dentistry and gynecological conditions. It makes many references to treating ailments with spells or religious techniques. One of the most important findings of this papyrus are the references to migraines which shows the condition dates back to this time.

=== Hearst Papyrus ===
The Hearst Papyrus was offered in 1901 to the Hearst Expedition in Egypt. It is dated around the 18th dynasty some time during the reign of Thutmose III, though doubts subsist about its authenticity. It concentrated on treatments for problems dealing with the urinary system, blood, hair, and bites. It has been extensively studied since its publication in 1905. Some of the context in the Hearst Papyrus has also been similarly found in the Ebers Papyrus and repeated in the Berlin Papyrus.

=== London Papyrus ===
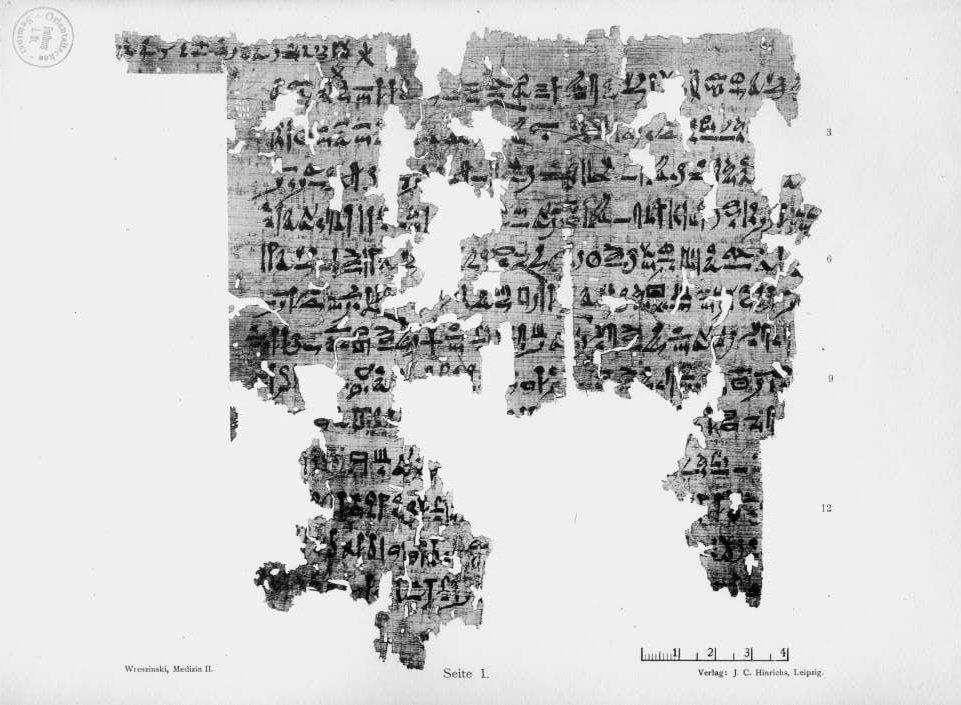
Londonpapyrus EA 10059

The London Medical Papyrus is located in the British Museum and dates back to Tutankhamun. Although in poor condition, study of it has found it to focus on magical spells as remedy for disease. The focus of the London Medical Papyrus is holistically spiritual and relies heavily on spells that deal with the supernatural. Instructions are given on driving out demons and raising people from the dead. All of the ideas expressed in the London Papyrus are meant to cure people of their ailments using supernatural methods.

=== Berlin Papyrus ===
The Greater Berlin Papyrus, also known as the Brugsch Papyrus (Pap. Berl. 3038) was discovered by Giuseppe Passalacqua. It consists of 24 pages and is very similar to the Ebers Papyrus. Later sold to Friedrich Wilhelm IV of Prussia with other objects in 1827 for the Berlin Museum, the Greater Berlin Papyrus was translated into German in 1909.

=== Carlsberg Papyrus ===
The Carlsberg Papyrus VIII is the property of the Carlsberg Foundation. The papyrus covers diseases of the eye and pregnancy. While similar to the Kahun and Berlin Papyrus, the Carlsburg papyrus goes into much more detail on pregnancy, covering methods such as determining whether or not a woman will give birth through the use of hippopotamus excrement. The Carlsberg Papyrus sheds light on how women will conceive and whether or not they will conceive, using garlic. This garlic is used as an indicator once properly placed in the body of a woman.

=== Chester Beatty Medical Papyrus ===
The Chester Beatty Medical Papyrus is named after Sir Alfred Chester Beatty who donated 19 papyri to the British Museum. The remedies in these texts are generally related to magic and focus on conditions that involve headaches and anorectal ailments.

=== Brooklyn Papyrus ===
The Brooklyn Papyrus – Focusing mainly on snakebites, the Brooklyn Papyrus speaks of remedial methods for poisons obtained from snakes, scorpions, and tarantulas. The Brooklyn Papyrus currently resides in the Brooklyn Museum.

== Table of ancient Egyptian medical papyri ==
Papyrus Name	Other names	Dating	Language	Medical specialties	Contents	Scribe/Author	Date & place of discovery	Place of preserving	Size	image
Edwin Smith Papyrus	Edwin Smith Surgical Papyrus	dates to Dynasties 16-17 of the Second Intermediate Period in Ancient Egypt, ca. 1500 BCE but believed to be a copy from Old Kingdom, 3000-2500 BCE	Hieratic	The oldest known surgical treatise on trauma	The vast majority of the papyrus is concerned with trauma and surgery, with short sections on gynecology and cosmetics on the verso. On the recto side, there are 48 cases of injury. The verso side consists of eight magic spells and five prescriptions. The oldest known surgical treatise on trauma	Attributed by some to Imhotep	Luxor, Egypt before 1862	New York Academy of Medicine	a scroll 4.68 metres (15.4 ft) in length. The recto (front side) has 377 lines in 17 columns, while the verso (backside) has 92 lines in five columns	
Ebers Papyrus	Papyrus Ebers	c. 1550 BC but believed to be a copy from earlier texts of 3400 BC	Hieratic	Medicine, Obstetrics & gynecology & surgery	The scroll contains some 700 magical formulas and remedies, chapters on contraception, diagnosis of pregnancy and other gynecological matters, intestinal disease and parasites, eye and skin problems, dentistry and the surgical treatment of abscesses and tumors, bone-setting and burns	N/A	Assassif district of the Theban necropolis before 1862	Library of University of Leipzig, Germany	a 110-page scroll, which is about 20 meters long	
Kahun Gynaecological Papyrus	Kahun Papyrus, Kahun Medical Papyrus, or UC 32057	ca. 1800 BCE	Hieratic	Medicine, Obstetrics & gynecology, pediatrics and veterinary medicine	The text is divided into thirty-four sections that deals with women's health—gynecological diseases, fertility, pregnancy, contraception, etc. The later Berlin Papyrus and the Ramesseum Papyrus IV cover much of the same ground, often giving identical prescriptions	N/A	El-Lahun by Flinders Petrie in 1889	Petrie Museum of Egyptian Archaeology	2 gynecologic papyri &1 veterinary payrus	
Ramesseum medical papyri	Ramesseum medical papyri parts III, IV, and V	18th century BC	Hieroglyphic & hieratic	Medicine, gynecology, ophthalmology, rheumatology & pediatrics	A collection of ancient Egyptian medical documents in parts III, IV, and V, and written in vertical columns that mainly dealt with ailments, diseases, the structure of the body, and supposed remedies used to heal these afflictions. Namely ophthalmologic ailments, gynecology, muscles, tendons, and diseases of children	N/A	Ramesseum temple	Ashmolean Museum	3 papyri (parts III, IV, V)	
Hearst papyrus	Hearst Medical Papyrus	18th Dynasty of Egypt, around time of Tuthmosis III ca. 0000 but believed to have been composed earlier, during the Middle Kingdom, around 2000 BC	Hieratic	Urology, Medicine and bites	260 paragraphs on 18 columns in 18 pages of medical prescriptions for problems of urinary system, blood, hair, and bites	N/A	discovered by an Egyptian peasant of village of Deir el-Ballas before 1901	Bancroft Library, University of California	18 pages	
London Medical Papyrus	BM EA 10059	19th dynasty 1300 BC or ca. 1629–1628 BC	Hieratic	skin complaints, eye complaints, bleeding, miscarriage and burns	61 recipes, of which 25 are classified as medical the remainder are of magic	N/A	N/A	British Museum		
Brugsch Papyrus	Pap. Berl. 3038, the Greater Berlin Papyrus	19th dynasty, and dated ca. 1350 - 1200 BC	Hieratic ?	Medical	discussing general medical cases and bears a great similarity to the Ebers papyrus. Some historians believe that this papyrus was used by Galen in his writings		Discovered by an Egyptian in Saqqara before 1827	Berlin Museum	24 pages (21 to the front and 3 on the back)	
Carlsberg papyrus	Carlsberg Papyrus VIII	between the 19th and 20th dynasties, New Kingdom; its style relates it to the 12th dynasty. Some fragments date back to ca. 2000 B.C., others — the Tebtunis manuscripts — date back to ca. 1st century A.D	Hieratic, Demotic. Hieroglyphs and in Greek	Obstetrics & gynecology, Medicine, Pediatrics & ophthalmology	The structure of the papyrus verso bears great resemblance to that of the Kahun and Berlin papyri. The recto is very damaged and nearly identical to the Ebers Papyrus.	N/A	N/A	Egyptological Institute of the University of Copenhagen		
Chester Beatty Medical Papyrus	Chester Beatty Papyri, Papyrus VI of the Chester Beatty Papyri 46 (Papyrus no. 10686, British Museum), Chester Beatty V BM 10685, VI BM 10686, VII BM 10687, VIII BM 10688, XV BM 10695	[dated around 1200 BC : Ramesside Era]	Hieratic	Headache, and Anorectal disorders	Magic spells and medical recipes for headache & anorectal disease	started off as a private collection by the scribe Qen-her-khepeshef in the 19th Dynasty and passed on down through his family until they were placed in a tomb	Deir el-Medina (the workers village) in 1928	British Museum		
Brooklyn Papyrus	47.218.48 och 47.218.85, also known as the Brooklyn Medical Papyrus	a collection of papyri which belong to the end of the 30th dynasty, dated to around 450 BC, or the beginning of the Ptolemaic Period. However, it is written with the Middle Kingdom style which could suggest its origin might be from the Thirteenth dynasty of Egypt	Hieratic	deals only with snakes and scorpion bites, and the formula to drive out the poison of such animals	It speaks about remedies to drive out poison from snakes, scorpions and tarantulas. The style of these remedies relates to that of the Ebers papyrus		might originate from a temple at ancient Heliopolis, discovered before 1885	Brooklyn Museum in New York	a scroll of papyrus divided into two parts with some parts missing, its total length is estimated to 175 by 27 centimetres (69 in × 11 in)	
Erman Papyrus	given with the Westcar papyrus to Berlin museum	Middle dated from the beginning of the New Kingdom (16th century BC)		Medicine, Magic & Anatomy	holds some medical formula and a list of anatomic names (body and viscera) and about 20 magical formula	N/A	before 1886 AD	Berlin Museum		
Leiden Papyrus	Rijksmuseum, Leiden I 343 - I 345	18th-19th dynasty		Medicine, Magic	It mostly deals with magical texts	N/A	N/A	Rijks museum, Leiden		
Papyrus Oxyrhynchus 2547	Oxyrhynchus 2547	3rd-century		Hippocratic Oath Papyru	Fragment of Hippocratic Oath	N/A	N/A	N/A	NlA	

== See also ==
- Ancient Egyptian medicine
- List of ancient Egyptian papyri
- Papyrology
