= Wḫdw =

Agent of decay and disease in ancient Egyptian medicine

G43 Aa1 D46 G43 Aa2 Z2ss
Wḫdw
Wḫdw
in hieroglyphs

Wḫdw is a term for a particular kind of agent of decay and disease in ancient Egyptian medicine.

According to Steuer, the Egyptians conceived of it as originating with the fecal matter within the bowels. From here, wḫdw was seen as being absorbed into the blood vessels (mtw) from the lower intestines (pḥwj, literally 'rear'), from where it spread to other body parts, causing abscesses and other symptoms of disease in the bodies of the living; it was particularly associated with pus in the blood. Meanwhile, in the bodies of the dead, wḫdw instead manifested as decomposition.

The similarity of this conception of disease and decay to the Ancient Greek concept of perittōma has suggested that this element of Ancient Greek medicine may be traceable to Egypt.

In searching for a convenient and concise translation of wḫdw into English, Steuer and Bertrand de Cusance Morant Saunders examine several possibilities: residues, a translation used by Jones for perittōma, fails to suggest the pathogenic nature of wḫdw; miasma, suggested by Jonckheere, misleadingly suggests transmission by air and an external origin; putrefaction or corruption, their own suggestion, is not entirely satisfactory to them, as wḫdw encompasses a conception greater than just the biological process of decay.

The term wḫdw is attested in the Ebers Papyrus, Hearst papyrus, and Papyrus Berlin 3038, among other sources.
