= Edwin Smith (Egyptologist) =

American dealer & collector of antiquities (1822-1906)

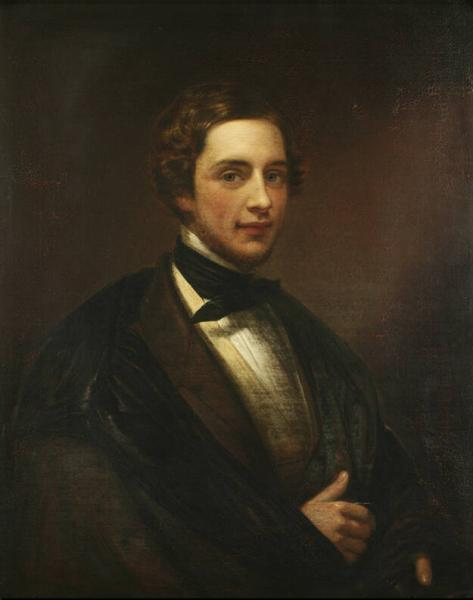
- Portrait of Edwin Smith painted 1847 by Francesco Anelli, in the collection of the New-York Historical Society.
- Born: 1822; Bridgeport, Connecticut
- Died: April 27, 1906 (aged 83–84)
- Occupations: dealer and collector of antiquities
- Known for: Edwin Smith Papyrus

Edwin Smith (1822 – April 27, 1906) was an American dealer and collector of antiquities who gave his name to an Ancient Egyptian medical papyrus, the Edwin Smith Papyrus.

== Life ==
Smith was born in Bridgeport, Connecticut, and lived in Egypt during the latter half of the 19th century. In 1862 he came temporarily into possession of a medical papyrus which was sold by its Egyptian owner to Georg Ebers in 1873 and published by Ebers in 1875. It was thus best known as the Ebers Papyrus.

In 1862 he also purchased the papyrus which came to bear his name, the Edwin Smith Papyrus, from a dealer called Mustapha Aga at Luxor. Smith's knowledge of hieratic was not sufficient to enable him to translate the papyrus, a task which was undertaken by James Henry Breasted, aided by Arno B. Luckhardt, a professor of physiology, and led to the publication of the translation in 1930.

Some two months after he purchased the Edwin Smith Papyrus, he was sold a forged papyrus made by gluing miscellaneous papyrus fragments onto a roll. Discovering the forgery, he separated the fragments, some of which belonged to the Edwin Smith Papyrus, and put those into their places in the papyrus. Some of the remaining fragments, traced to the Rhind Mathematical Papyrus, are now kept with the Edwin Smith Papyrus in the Brooklyn Museum.

Edwin Smith died in 1906.

== See also ==
- List of Egyptologists
