= Walter Wreszinski =

German Egyptologist (1880–1935)

Walter Wreszinski (18 March 1880 – 9 April 1935) was a German Egyptologist and professor at Albertus University of Königsberg.

== Early life ==
Wreszinski was born in Mogilno on 18 March 1880. He studied in Leipzig from 1898 to 1899, then in Berlin from 1899 to 1904 (under Adolf Erman). During this period he worked on the Dictionary of the Egyptian language. In Berlin, he graduated in 1904 with a dissertation on The High Priest of Amon.

== Career ==
Following his graduation, he moved to Königsberg in 1909, initially as a lecturer, then from 1920 as honorary associate professor, and from 1927 as associate professor.

From 1921 to 1931 Wreszinski was editor of the Orientalist literature journal.

In 1934, after the Law for the Restoration of Civil Service was passed by the Nazi Party led government, Wreszinski lost his professorship by reason of his Jewish ancestry.

== Death ==
Wreszinski died in Königsberg on 9 April 1935.

== Works ==
The five-volume Atlas of Ancient Egyptian Culture History is considered Wreszinski's masterpiece.

- The high priest of Amon (dissertation), Berlin, 1904.
- Egyptian Inscriptions from the K.K. Court Museum in Vienna, Leipzig, 1906.
- The medicine of the ancient Egyptians I. The large medical papyrus in the Berlin Museum (Berl Pap. 3038). In facsimile and transcription with translation, commentary and glossary, Leipzig 1909.
- The medicine of the ancient Egyptians II The London Medical Papyrus (BM 10059) and the Papyrus Hearst. Transcription, translation and commentary, Leipzig 1912.
- The medicine of the ancient Egyptians III. The Papyrus Ebers. Transcription, translation and commentary, Leipzig 1913th
- Lepsius: Monuments of Egypt and Ethiopia, Volume V, 1913.
- Atlas of ancient Egyptian cultural history, 5 vols, Leipzig 1913–1936.
- Report on the photographic expedition from Cairo to Wadi Halfa. Order to prepare and collect material for my Atlas of ancient Egyptian history, culture, Leipzig 1927

== Literature ==
- Bierbrier, ML, Warren R. Dawson, Eric P. Uphill, Who's Who in Egyptology, London 1995, p. 452-453.
