= Disability in Ancient Egypt =

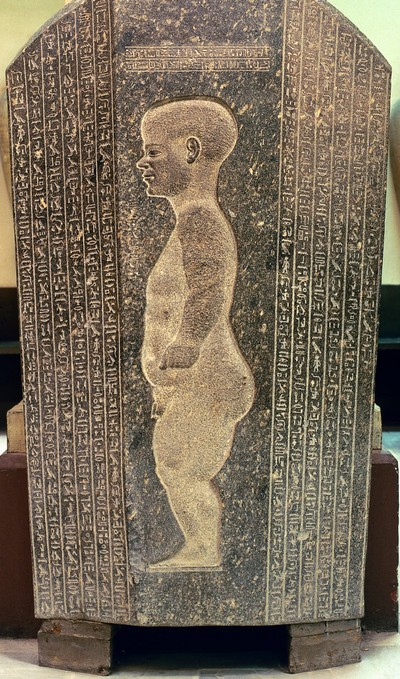
The sarcophagus lid from the Late Period (713-332 BCE) belonged to a dancer Dejahir

Within Ancient Egypt, people with disabilities were recorded throughout the civilization's entire existence. Ancient Egypt had a highly tolerant view of the disabled and they were well integrated into society. Awareness and medical care for physical disabilities was present but were lacking for mental disabilities. Achondroplastic Dwarfism is the most common disability depicted in Egyptian Art and the sheer amount of the depictions that survive show that the rate of dwarfism in Ancient Egypt was higher than it is in the modern day. The divine mandates in the Instruction of Amenemope, state "do not laugh at a blind man, nor tease a dwarf, nor cause hardship for the lame."

== Societal treatment ==
Ancient Egyptian society and religion were fairly accepting of the disabled and in accordance with this view the disabled were integrated into public life and often took roles as scribes, musicians, and craftsmen; though many did have to resort to begging. Within Ancient Egypt there is some evidence to suggest that there was some form of healthcare for the disabled, though there is no evidence to suggest the presence of laws protecting them.

Ancient Egyptian culture both people's disabilities and strengths were bestowed upon them by the gods, and teaching that all people had their role in play society. Which alongside religious teachings encouraging empathy, kindness, and charity encouraged broader society to treat the disabled well. An extremely large amount of artistic depictions of the disabled of all social classes exist, further showing their acceptance by broader society. Several Ancient Egyptian gods were depicted as disabled: Bes and Ptah-Patek were depicted with Dwarfism, Harpocrates was depicted with cerebral palsy, Horus was either partially or fully blind, and Hephaestus had a clubbed foot.

As most Egyptians worked as farmers and lived in communities centered around farming, most disabled Egyptians would have had to contribute in some way to the collective workload. It is likely that some of the less physically demanding jobs such as animal husbandry, scaring away pests, or weeding would have been left to the disabled alongside children and the elderly.

== Medicine ==
Due to war, parasites, disease, and excessive sand Ancient Egyptian were very prone to eye conditions. While there was no cure to congenital blindness, other eye afflictions were treated by poppy anemone, olives, crocus, violets, malachite, lapis lazuli, milk, and animal bile (primarily cow, but fish and ox bile). Donkey testes mixed with wine were used to treat the unidentified eye disease called nesyt and cannabis was also used though why exactly is unclear. Wheat, honey, cyperus grass, beer, grapes, balanites, juniper berries, ochre, umbrella pine of Byblos grains, bryony, moringa oil, salt of Lower Egypt, and tree gums were used to treat urinary disorders. Pomegranates were used to treat epilepsy and paralysis. Malachite was used for mouth and breast inflammation. Wine was used for ulcers, depression, liver disease and asthma. Opium, morphine, lotus, terebinth resin, and myrrh were used in pain management.

Despite their awareness of physical disabilities Ancient Egyptians seemed to have little awareness of mental illness and disability. Medical texts referring to the brain always do so in terms of physical health focusing on things such as neurological disorders and traumatic injury. Though they did understand the importance of mental states in the treatment of physical conditions.

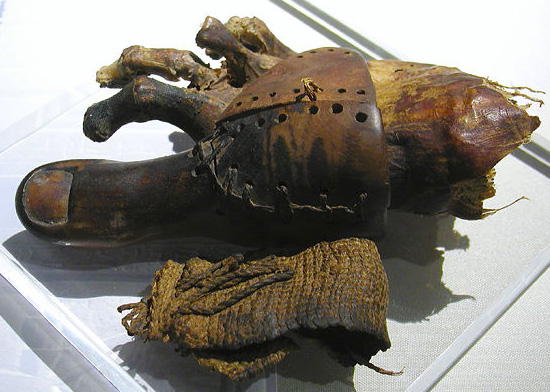
The Cairo Toe

=== Prosthetics ===
The first known functional prosthetic ever discovered is prosthetic big toe called the Cairo Toe which was made around 1000 BCE likely for a high status woman. Other aesthetic and functional prosthetics such as the 600 BCE Cartonnage toe are also known. Prosthetics were sometimes buried with their mummified owners due to cultural ideals around bodily perfections. Aside from these more simple mobility aids such as walking sticks were very common.

== Notable disabled people ==
- Harkhuf
- Phillip III Arrhidaeus
- Ramesses-Meryamun-Nebweben
- Seneb
- Siptah
