= Deir el-Ballas =

Archaeological site in Egypt

- Location within Egypt
- 26.0469°N 32.7518°E
- Type: settlement
- Location: Egypt

Site notes
- Excavation dates: 1894-1895, 1900-1901, 1980, 1983-1984, 1986
- Archaeologists: James Quibell, George Andrew Reisner, Peter Lacovara
- Owner: Public
- Public access: Yes

Deir el-Ballas is an archaeological site in Upper Egypt. It was the location of a royal palace and administration center occupied by rulers of the Seventeenth Dynasty in ancient Egypt's late Second Intermediate Period.

== Location ==
Deir el-Ballas was "strategically located at a bend in the Nile" on its western bank, approximately twenty kilometers south of Dendara and just north of Thebes (modern-day Luxor).

== History ==
The complex was "a short-lived royal city-palace built by Theban kings as a military base for imperial campaigns against the Hyksos, a group of foreign rulers who had taken control of northern (Lower) Egypt during a period of national weakness at the end of the Middle Kingdom." Which of these kings built it in which dynasty is not yet known.

"A collection of inscribed potsherds, or ostraca, were recovered from Deir el-Ballas. These confirm that the forces for the attack on the Hyksos capital were marshalled here, and describe the large quantities of goods and personnel that were brought to the site, including cattle, men, possibly weapons, and a roster of ships and their crews. The Kamose Stela....mentions the assembly of the Theban fleet at a place called Per-djed-ken, which may well be the original name for Deir el-Ballas; another text mentions a royal residence at Sedjefatawy that belonged to Ahmose, the Theban king credited with driving out the Hyksos."

"With the success of the Thebans, the city-palace at Deir el-Ballas was no longer necessary, and was swiftly abandoned." However, the surrounding area continued to be used for a short time as a burial ground, as cemeteries were discovered "dating to the late Second Intermediate Period and the early 18th Dynasty, during the second half of the 16th centuries BC."

== Structures ==
A rendering of the Northern Palace

Deir el-Ballas consisted of several facilities—the North Palace, the South Palace, and "clusters of habitation...located north and south of the central [North] palace"

The clusters included an administrative quarter, a workman's village, and private houses, the latter anywhere from small two-room huts to large villas.

=== North Palace ===
Peter Lacovara, in the September 2017 issue of Current World Archaeology, notes that "the royal residence--North Palace – was built at the midpoint of a large semicircle of limestone cliffs that border the low desert, with clusters of residential buildings to the north and south of it...The full size of the settlement is unknown, as the eastern end of the site, which extends into agricultural land, remains uncovered. However, at least 45,000m2 of the North Palace and its enclosures have been recorded... The palace itself is made of unusually large mud bricks, about 54cm × 27cm × 18cm, and comprises a series of columned courts and a long entrance hall, grouped around an elevated central platform. This platform was constructed on casemate foundations: long mud-brick chambers filled in with rubble and capped by a brick pavement. Some of these casemates survive to a height of about 5m. They once supported the raised private apartments of the palace, which would have given it the appearance of a fortified 'Migdol’ tower." Lacovara notes elsewhere that "the palace was decorated with wall paintings of armed men carrying battle axes, and faience tiles, fragments of which were recovered by the Hearst Expedition." According to author Margaret Bunson, "the palaces (pero or per-a'a) (of the Second Intermediate Period) always contained two gateways, two main halls, and two administrative sections to reflect the upper and lower regions of the nation. Flagstaffs were used at the gates, as they were placed before temples. The remains of the Seventeenth Dynasty (1640–1550 BCE) palace at Deir el-Ballas, on the western shore north of Thebes, indicate somewhat luxurious surroundings and innovative decoration, following the "double" scheme. In some instances the walls and floors were designed to portray pools of fish and vast tracts of flowering shrubs."

=== South Palace ===
According to Lacovara, "the southern extent of the settlement at Deir el-Ballas was marked by a large, rectangular mud-brick platform. Reisner [head of the Hearst expedition in 1900-1901] called this the ‘South Palace’, but it is clearly non-residential in character. Situated at the top of the hill, far from the rest of the settlement, it enjoyed commanding views of the Nile and surrounding countryside. The building has a wide terrace, fronting an elevated platform measuring about 40m wide and 150m long, with a broad flight of stairs leading to the top. Though the upper section of the platform, which has been all but destroyed by centuries of looting, probably supported reed structures or tents rather than a substantial construction. The design and location of the ‘South Palace’ suggest that, rather than a palace, it was an observation tower, keeping watch over the river and the southern approach to the settlement, and monitoring traffic entering the settlement. It was also an ideal post from which to watch the movement of the Theban fleet."

=== Other Facilities ===
==== North Wadi settlement ====
Within a group of houses north of the North Palace was found a clay oven 45 cm in diameter and 55 cm tall, similar to ovens found in other villages like Amarna.

==== Workmen's Village ====
The workmen’s village was situated apart from the main settled area. "A series of roughly built stone and mud-brick structures, consisting of one or more courts connected by short flights of stairs, were cut into the hillside. They closely resemble the layout of chapels found in the workmen’s village at Amarna."

==== Houses D, E and F ====
In 2022, Lacovara's team explored the North Suburb, a settlement area directly west of the North Palace. There they discovered at least three buildings, Houses D, E and F.

House D seems to have served partly as a bakery.

House E seems to be a large villa complex, with western and southern portions containing ash deposits, agate beads, and other signs pointing to home industry and crafts. "The structure had been partially excavated and planned by the Hearst Expedition in 1900-1901 and was re-excavated by Cynthia Shartzer in 1985. One small section was exposed to floor level and was revealed to be a textile workshop (Room 5) in a remarkable state of preservation. A wooden beam that would have held a grasped spindle for making thread was found beside a column base, which had a socket cut into it to support the beam. Beside that was a limestone saddle-shaped bench for the weaver to sit on and a pottery spinning bowl...There was even a wool roving and woolen thread in the fill associated with the finds. At the north end of the section were two mud-brick bins, one of which still contained an upright post...While the elements had remained intact in House E, looters had dug a large hole through the center of the adjoining unexcavated room, although a great deal was left, including Egyptian pottery, fragments of Nubian Kerma ware and a Canaanite amphora." Two mudbrick containers in Room 5 were found to contain burned items of refuse—broken pottery, flint tools, animal bones, a bronze needle, a broken clay figurine, and burned plants among dense ash deposits---and four circular mudbrick installations in Room 4 are hypothesized to be silos for grain or food.

House F lies 32.5 meters southeast of House E, and is where the expedition found 150 unbaked mud "eggs" that possibly served as administrative seal blanks. Beads, needles, grinding stones, cookpots, a fish-shaped bread mold, a metal needle, a combination curling tong and hair trimmer, and other small items have been recovered here as well. This house, measuring 14 x 10 meters, has its main room directly accessing a large northern courtyard running the length of the house. A low trough and preserved excrement in this courtyard suggests a cow was kept by the inhabitants, and a clay circular structure in the eastern part may have been a platform for grinding food The entrance to the main room has two raised rectangular features on either side that suggest benches or platforms, has a limestone pillar in the center to support the roof, and has two doors leading to different wings of the house. Upon reaching the floor level, a large broken vessel was found that had evidence of burning, which resembled room heating implements found at other sites

== Excavation ==
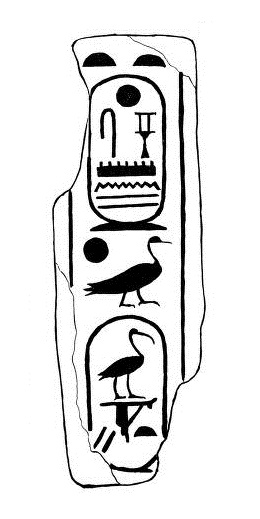
Brick with cartouches of pharaoh Djehuti, unearthed at Deir el-Ballas

The site was excavated by James Quibell from 1894 until 1895 in association with the excavations of Flinders Petrie at Naqada. In September 1899, Quibell took G. A. Reisner on a tour of the sites he had worked in the area.

Deir el-Ballas was excavated from 1900 to 1901 by a University of California team led by George Andrew Reisner, sponsored by Phoebe A. Hearst and led by George Andrew Reisner "These excavations uncovered a large royal palace, a settlement, and a series of cemeteries dating to the late Second Intermediate Period and the early Eighteenth Dynasty;" however, expedition records neither proved adequate enough for understanding nor were compiled for publication. (The Ancient Egyptian Heritage and Archaeology Fund, however, received a three-year grant to accomplish this in 2016 from the Shelby White and Leon Levy Program for Archaeological Publications. The excavated materials, housed in the Museum of Fine Arts, Boston, and the Phoebe A. Hearst Museum of the University of California in Berkley, were studied, photographed and drawn, and these and Reisner's notes are as of January 2022 being collected into two volumes. One is on the cemeteries at the site and the second is on the ancient settlement.)

"In order to clarify the records of the expedition and enable publication of the site, four seasons of survey and clearance were undertaken in 1980, 1983, 1984 and 1986 by Peter Lacovara under the sponsorship of the American Research Center and the Museum of Fine Arts, Boston." Their findings "revealed a site far larger than the Hearst expedition records had indicated, including palace complexes, a group of large houses, and remains of a previously unrecorded ancient settlement." "In addition to the large number of houses and other domestic structures, there appears to have been a group of memorial chapels similar to those recently excavated by The Egypt Exploration Society at Tell el-Amarna, and possibly an administrative quarter, also corresponding to Tell el-Amarna. At the conclusion of the survey seasons, a preliminary report was published under the auspices of the American Research Center in Egypt."

Some significant items discovered in this area include a carved limestone block inscribed with the name of the pharaoh Djehuti from the Second Intermediate Period and the Hearst papyrus, a Middle Kingdom-era medical text discovered in the area by an Egyptian peasant around the turn of the 20th century.

According to Peter Lacovara, "In more recent years, the growth of the modern village and the construction of a number of roads along the desert edge, along with looting that occurred during the revolution in 2011 has threatened to destroy a significant part of the site."

Lacovara and his team "were asked to come back to the site at the request of Mr. Mostafa Waziri and the Qena Inspectorate of Antiquities, because of their concern for the preservation and restoration of this important area." For two weeks in January 2017, Lacovara led an expedition "consist[ing] of a theodolite survey, photography and planning to assess the condition of the site, the perimeter of the antiquities area and possible ways to protect and conserve the site."

The team returned December 2018 through January 2019 for several restoration projects: replacing, cleaning and capping brick in the eastern facade of the South Palace's stair platform that had been dug out by looters; restoring the same platform's original appearance by filling in its casemates and leveling out its top; clean and refill the casemate foundations and restore the surviving walls of the North Palace; remove trash and debris from both sites; and place fencing and signs in both Arabic and English around the dig sites to deter further damage. "A surprising discovery made during the work [on the South Palace's stair platform] were a number of large ship timbers which had been re-used to strengthen the wall. These were undoubtedly recycled from the Theban fleet that had assembled at the site for the campaign against the Hyksos." Unfortunately, they learned that "many of the ancient houses, the workmen’s village and associated chapels have been entirely destroyed by the expansion of modern habitation and the town’s cemetery."

For the December 2019-January 2020 season, work on the above projects was continued. The team also began work on restoring the earlier-mentioned Houses D, E, and F; the southern part of the main enclosure wall of the North Palace, and the southwest corner of the casemate core of the North Palace.

Because of the COVID-19 pandemic, work was not able to be resumed until, and only during, May 2021. A new project for the season was the excavation of two previously-untouched clusters near the South Palace: "In Area 2 was a very long, large building made up of a number of small rooms, and in Area 1 was a cluster of large and small structures extending over a broad area. This further supports our theory that this part of the site, like the Central City at Tell el-Amarna, was an administrative district. Moreover, the location of these structures at the mouth of a wadi running down to the river may signal that this was the location of the port for the settlement."

The restoration of the South Palace was finished in 2023 and work was started on rebuilding the North Palace's casemate foundations and original enclosure wall.
