= Ebers Papyrus =

Ancient Egyptian medical papyrus

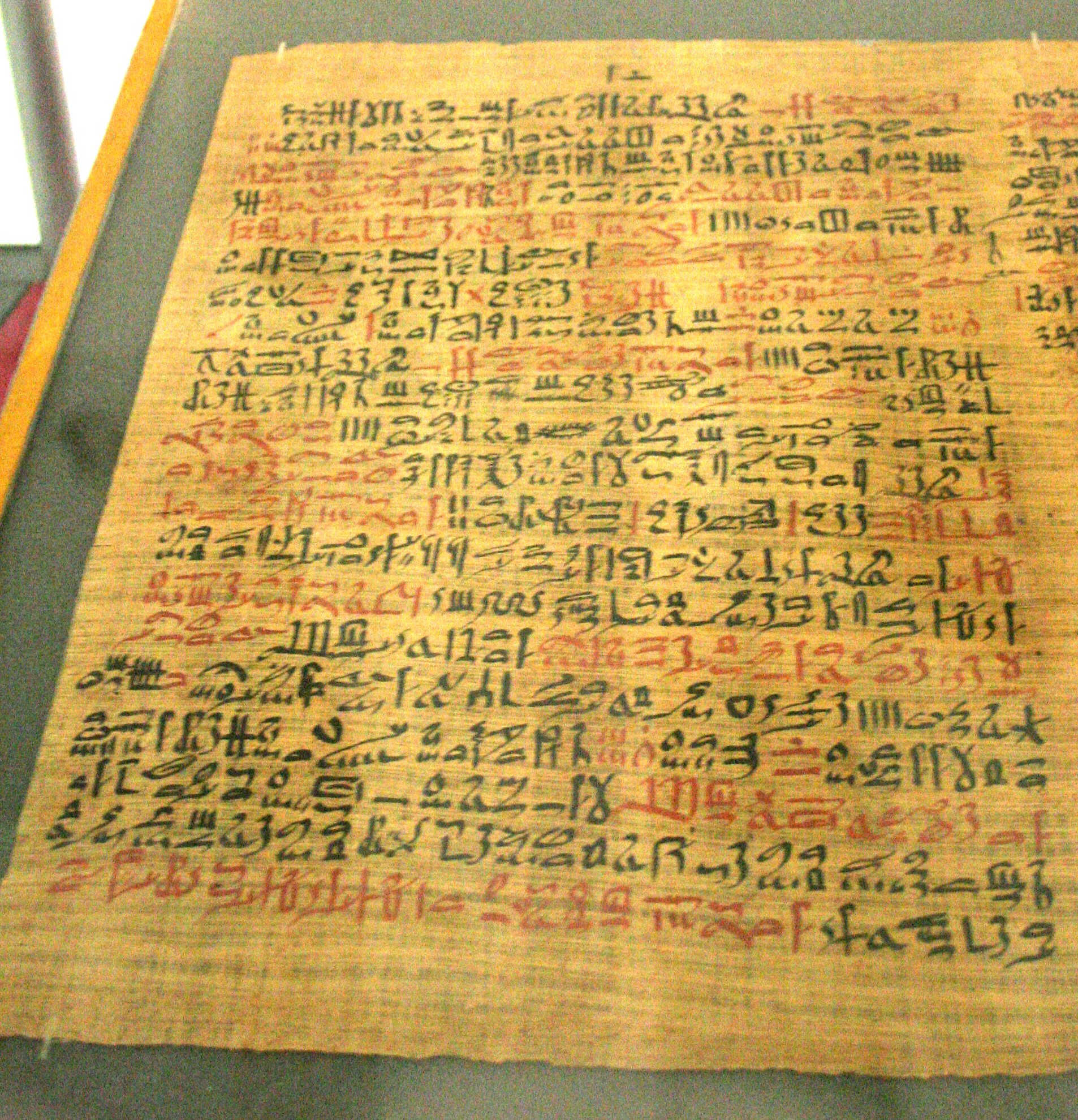
- Size: length: c. 20 meters
- Created: c. 1550 BCE
- Discovered: Egypt
- Present location: Leipzig, Saxony, Germany
- Language: Hieratic Egyptian

The Ebers Papyrus, also known as Papyrus Ebers, is an Egyptian medical papyrus of herbal knowledge dating to c. 1550 BCE (the late Second Intermediate Period or early New Kingdom). Among the oldest and most important medical papyri of Ancient Egypt, it was sold by Mohareb Todros to the German Egyptologist Georg Ebers at Luxor in the winter of 1873–1874. It is currently kept at the Leipzig University Library in Germany.

== Manuscript ==
The papyrus was written in Ancient Egypt in c. 1550 BCE, during the late Second Intermediate Period or early New Kingdom, but it is believed to have been copied from earlier Egyptian texts. The Ebers Papyrus is a 110-page scroll, which is about 20 meters long.

Along with the Kahun Gynaecological Papyrus (c. 1800 BCE), the Edwin Smith Papyrus (c. 1600 BCE), the Hearst papyrus (c. 1600 BCE), the Brugsch Papyrus (c. 1300 BCE), and the London Medical Papyrus (c. 1300 BCE), the Ebers Papyrus is among the oldest preserved medical documents. The Brugsch and the London Medical papyri share some of the same information as the Ebers Papyrus.

One side of another document, the Carlsberg papyrus VIII, is identical to the Ebers Papyrus, though the provenance of the former is unknown.

== Medical knowledge ==
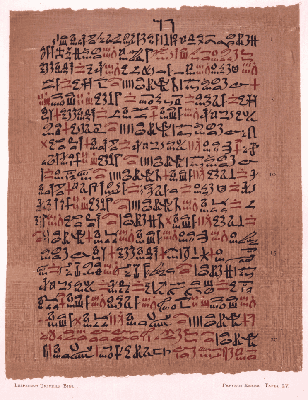
The treatment for asthma suggested in the Ebers papyrus is a mixture of herbs heated on a brick so that the patient could inhale their fumes

The Ebers Papyrus is written in hieratic Egyptian writing and represents the most extensive and best-preserved record of ancient Egyptian medicine known.

The scroll contains over 842 magical formulas and folk remedies and general injuries. It contains many incantations meant to turn away disease-causing demons and there is also evidence of a long tradition of empiricism.

The papyrus contains a "treatise on the heart". It notes that the heart is the centre of the blood supply, with vessels attached for every member of the body.

The ancient Egyptians seem to have known little about the kidneys and made the heart the meeting point of a number of vessels which carried all the fluids of the body –blood, tears, urine and semen.

Mental disorders are detailed in a chapter of the papyrus called the Book of Hearts. Disorders such as depression and dementia are covered. The descriptions of these disorders suggest that Egyptians conceived of mental and physical diseases in much the same way.

The papyrus contains chapters on contraception, diagnosis of pregnancy and other gynecological matters, intestinal disease and parasites, eye and skin problems, dentistry, the surgical treatment of abscesses and tumors, bone-setting, and burns.

The "channel theory" was prevalent at the time of writing of the Ebers papyrus; it suggested that unimpeded flow of bodily fluids is a prerequisite for good health.

The Ebers papyrus may be considered a precursor of ancient Greek humoral pathology and the subsequently established theory of humorism, providing a historical connection between ancient Egypt, ancient Greece, and medieval medicine.

== Animal repellents ==
The use of animal and insect repellents derived from plants and other organisms found in nature is known from the time of the Ebers Papyrus. Several examples of such repellents can be found in the text.

- To prevent fleas and lice, Egyptians would mix in date-meal and water in bowls and cook the mixture until warm. They would then drink it and spit it out.
- To protect their grain from rodents and vermin, they would spread gazelle dung and mice urine around the fire in the granary.

== Calendar ==
In the time of Amenhotep I a calendar table was written on the verso side of the papyrus. Since 1906 we have a transcript by Kurt Sethe. Some rate this table to be "the most valuable chronological tool from Egypt that we are ever likely to possess".

== Modern history of the papyrus ==
Like the Edwin Smith Papyrus, the Ebers Papyrus came into the possession of Edwin Smith in 1862.

The source of the papyrus is unknown, but it was said to have been found between the legs of a mummy in the El-Assasif district of the Theban necropolis.

The papyrus remained in the collection of Edwin Smith until at least 1869, when there appeared—in the catalog of an antiquities dealer—an advertisement for "a large medical papyrus in the possession of Edwin Smith, an American farmer of Luxor."

The papyrus was purchased in 1872 by the German Egyptologist and novelist, Georg Ebers, after whom it is named.

== Translations ==
In 1875, Ebers published a facsimile with an English-Latin vocabulary and introduction. It was not until 1890, however, that it was translated by H. Joachim. In the early 1900s, Dr. Carl H. von Klein, alongside his daughter Edith Zitelmann, created a direct-to-English translation of the Ebers Papyrus. Ebers retired from his chair of Egyptology at Leipzig on a pension and the papyrus remained in the University of Leipzig library. An English translation of the papyrus was published by Paul Ghalioungui. The papyrus was published and translated by different researchers.

The Ebers Papyrus is available online, at a dedicated website, with translations in English and German.

== See also ==
- List of ancient Egyptian papyri
- History of medicine
- Medical literature
