= Erman Papyrus =

The Erman Papyrus (Papyrus Berlin 3027) is an ancient Egyptian medical papyrus. Fifteen columns of the papyrus are preserved, nine on the recto and six on the verso. The papyrus dates to around 1600 BC at the end of the Second Intermediate Period.

The papyrus was given to the Egyptian Museum of Berlin in 1886 (inventoried as Papyrus Berlin 3027 in the Berlin Papyrus Collection), and was first published in 1901 by Adolf Erman. It is mostly concerned with childbirth and the health of infants, containing two prescriptions for unknown childhood diseases and a number of magical incantations for childbirth and the protection of infants.

== See also ==
- List of ancient Egyptian papyri
- Ancient Egyptian medicine
- Papyrology
