= Merit Ptah (crater) =

Crater on Venus

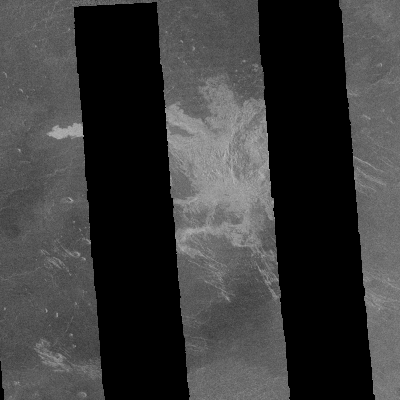
- Radar image of Merit Ptah. The black bands indicate missing data.
- Location: Venus
- Coordinates: 11.4°N 115.6°E
- Diameter: 17 km
- Eponym: Merit Ptah

Merit Ptah is an impact crater on Venus, named in honor of alleged ancient Egyptian chief physician Merit Ptah whose existence was later exposed as a hoax.

The only known real person by that name was married to Ramose (TT55), a governor of Thebes under Akhetaten.
