= Psamtikseneb =

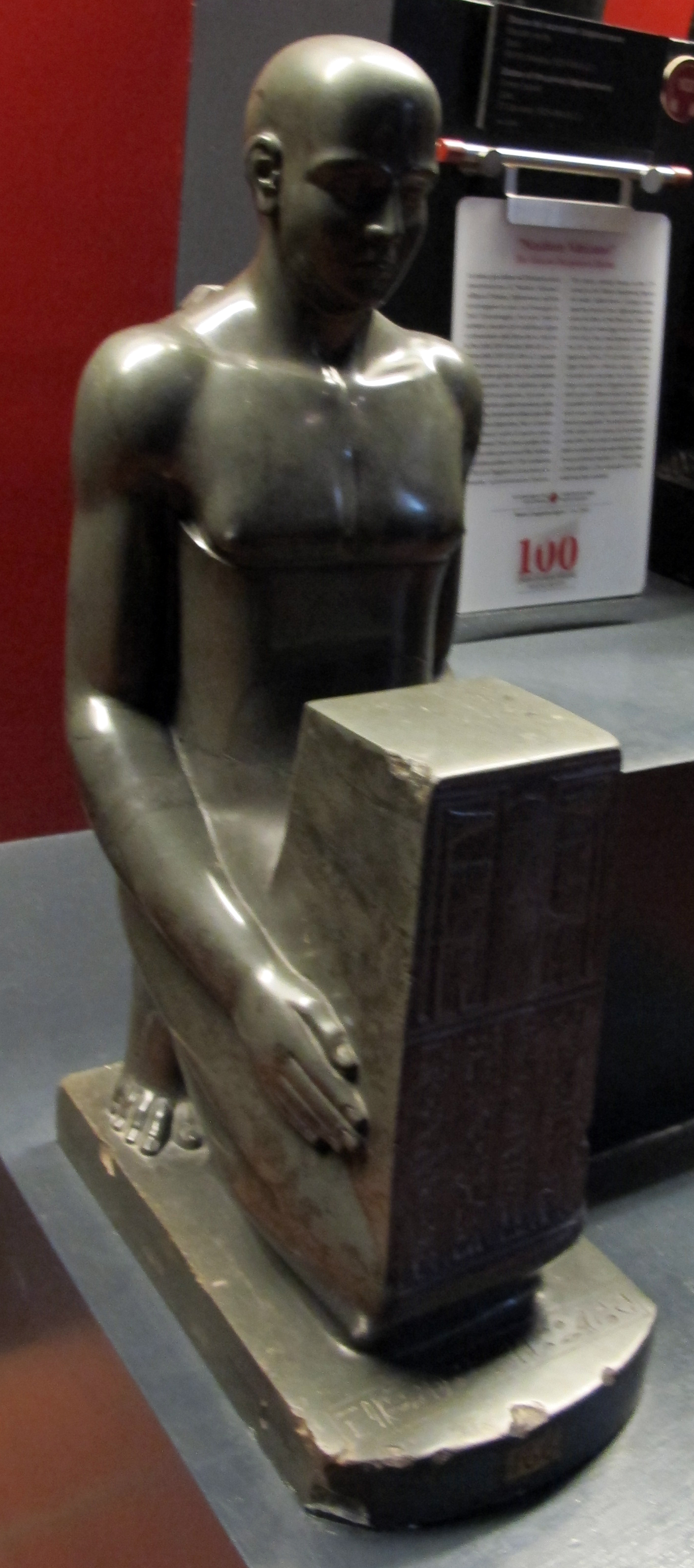
Statue of Psamtikseneb, Musei Vaticani, inv. 22687; the head is not ancient.

Psamtikseneb (Egyptian: Psmṯk-snb, meaning “(King) Psamtik is healthy”) was an ancient Egyptian high official during the 26th Dynasty (664–525 BC), perhaps under king Psamtik II.

== Biography ==
< p s m T k > s n b
Psamtikseneb
Psmṯk-snb
in hieroglyphs
Era: Late Period
(664–332 BC)

He came from a family of important officials: his brother was the leader of the houses of Neith (ḫrp ḥwwt nit) Nekau, while his second brother was also leader of the houses and was called Tefnakht.

Psamtikseneb was a chief physician and chief dentist (wr ἰbḥ) and also an admiral (ḫrp qqwt - leader of the transport/war-ships). Especially on a statue now in the Musei Vaticani, Psamtikseneb bears a number of important titles, such as sole friend, leader of the foremost thrones, chief dentist of the pharaoh, scorpion charmer and son of Selket, the latter being the name of the ancient Egyptian scorpion goddess. On his sarcophagus were only inscribed the titles scorpion charmer and son of Selket.

He was buried in his tomb discovered at Heliopolis in 1931–32. There was found his inscribed sarcophagus which is now on display in Norfolk, Virginia at the Chrysler Museum. There are shabtis known, perhaps belonging to him.

== See also ==
- Ancient Egyptian medicine
