= Akhethetep (scribe) =

Akhethetep was an ancient Egyptian official of the Old Kingdom, who is known from his burial at Giza, excavated in 1929–1930 by the Egyptian Egyptologist Selim Hassan. Akhethetep had several rather modest titles, including ka-priest of the king's mother, scribe of the treasury or inspector of the scribes of the granary. He was also inspector of scribes at Akhet-Khufu. Akhet-Khufu is the Great Pyramid of Giza, the pyramid of Khufu. His wife was a woman called Nikauhathor. Two other people are also mentioned on a false door in his tomb: a certain Kainefer and a woman called Peseshet. The latter, with the title overseer of the physicians, is perhaps the first female doctor known by name. The relationship of these two people to Akhethetep is unknown. Selim Hassan wonders whether they were his parents.

Akhethetep was buried in a mastaba that was partly carved into the rocks, partly built of stones. Only some parts of the inner rooms were decorated and inscribed.

The exact dating of Akhethetep is uncertain.
