= Merit-Ptah =

Purported Ancient Egyptian physician

Merit-Ptah ("Beloved of Ptah") was thought to be a female chief physician of the king's court during the Second Dynasty of Egypt, c. 2700 BC. She was purportedly referred as such on an inscription left on her grave at Saqqara by her son.

However, in recent times it has been argued that she most likely never existed, being a modern 1938 invention of Canadian feminist Kate Hurd-Mead. Jakub Kwiecinski, a historian at the University of Colorado, was cited by secondary source Newsweek arguing that the made-up story of Merit-Ptah exemplifies how "seemingly well-sourced Wikipedia articles" can mislead, and he cautioned against over-reliance on secondary sources.

== History ==
Merit-Ptah first appears in literature in a 1937 book by Kate Campbell Hurd-Mead on female doctors. Campbell Hurd-Mead presents two ancient Egyptian female doctors, an unnamed one dating to the Fifth Dynasty and Merit-Ptah, dating evidently to the New Kingdom as Hurd-Mead states that she is shown in the Valley of the Kings (the burial ground of Egyptian kings from about 1500 BC to 1080 BC). The unnamed Old Kingdom female doctor is most likely Peseshet who is known from a tomb of the period.

Later authors did not notice that Kate Campbell Hurd-Mead presented two doctors and mixed the data of the two women; Merit-Ptah was thus back-dated to the Old Kingdom.

Campbell Hurd-Mead in her book describes a tomb in the Valley of the Kings where there was a "picture of a woman doctor named Merit Ptah, the mother of a high priest, who is calling her 'the Chief Physician.'"

A female doctor Merit-Ptah is not known from any other Ancient Egyptian source, and no research publication listing doctors mentions her. A namesake, yet completely unrelated woman was the wife of Ramose, the Governor of Thebes and Vizier under Akhenaten, and she is depicted along with her husband in TT55 in Sheikh Abd el-Qurna.

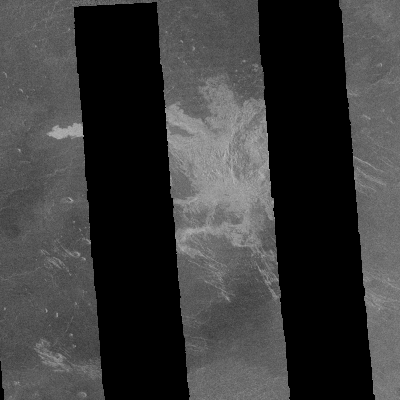
Merit Ptah crater on Venus

The International Astronomical Union named the Merit Ptah Crater on Venus after her.
