= Payeftjauemawyneith =

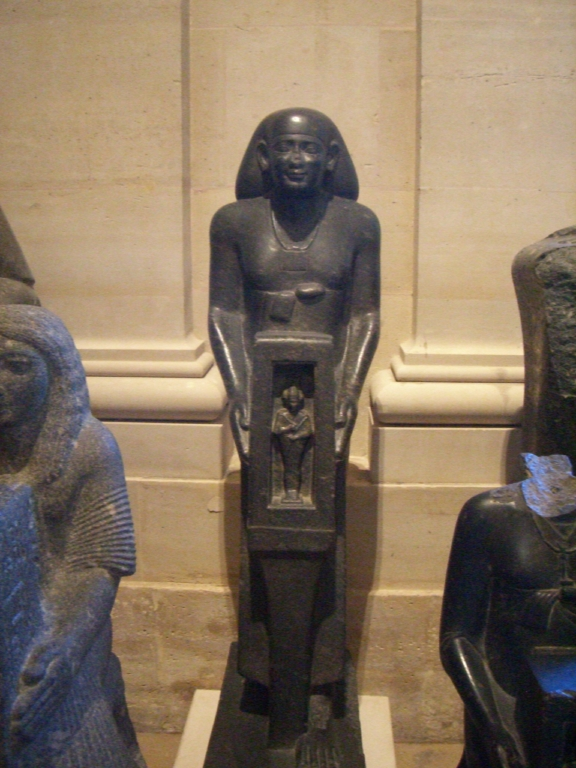
Statue of Payeftjauemawyneith in the Louvre (A 93)

Payeftjauemawyneith or Peftuaneith was an ancient Egyptian high official who lived during the 26th Dynasty, serving under the kings Apries and Amasis. He is known from several monuments providing evidence for his importance.

There is a statue originally coming from Heliopolis as the inscription on the statue indicates, which is today in the British Museum (EA 83). From a further statue, now in the Louvre (A 93), it is known that Payeftjauemawyneith ordered several renovation works at Abydos and its surroundings during the reign of Amasis. There is an offering table found at Memphis and a third statue also discovered at Memphis. A fourth statue was excavated at Buto. Payeftjauemawyneith held several important titles, including high steward and overseer of the double treasury. He also held the title of a physician.

His mother was a woman called Nanesbastet. His father was an official called Sasobek with several titles including leader of the palace, Priest of Horus from Pe and Priest of Amun from the northern Thebes.
