= London Medical Papyrus =

Ancient Egyptian papyrus in the British Museum

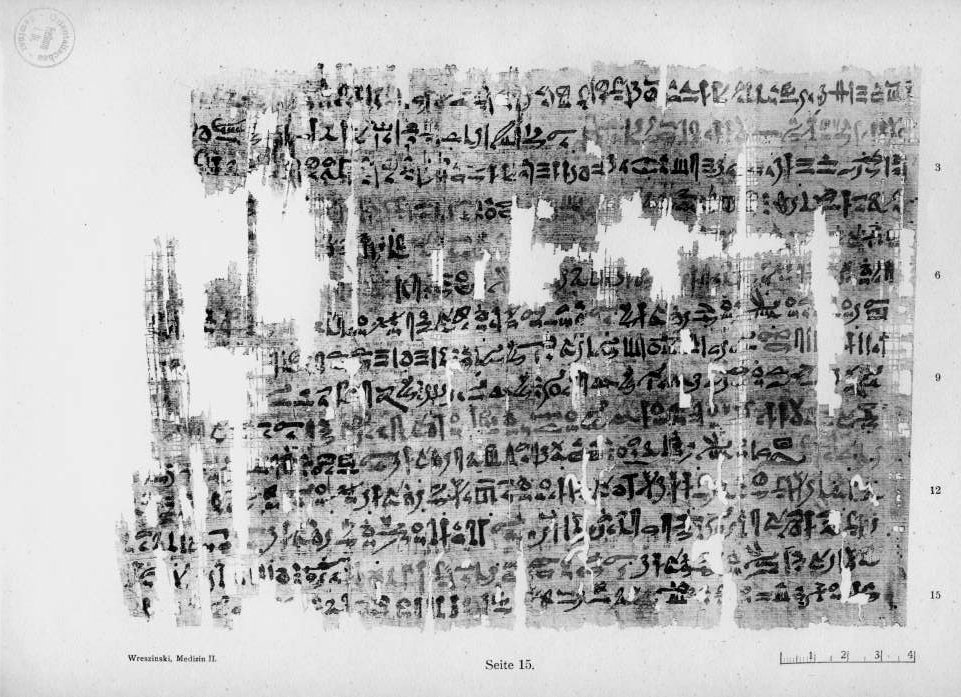
- Created: c. 1325 BC
- Discovered: before 1913; Egypt
- Present location: British Museum, London, England

The London Medical Papyrus is an ancient Egyptian papyrus in the British Museum, London. The writings of this papyrus are of 61 recipes, of which 25 are classified as medical while the remainder are of magic.

The medical subjects of the writing are skin complaints, eye complaints, bleeding (predominantly with the intent of preventing miscarriage through magical methods) and burns. The content is using the hieratic script (the handwriting system), mixing also North Semetic words, Akkadian and other local dialects.

The papyrus was first published in 1912 in Leipzig by Walter Wreszinski.

The papyrus is also known as BM EA 10059.

== See also ==
- Ebers Papyrus
- Edwin Smith Papyrus
- List of ancient Egyptian papyri
