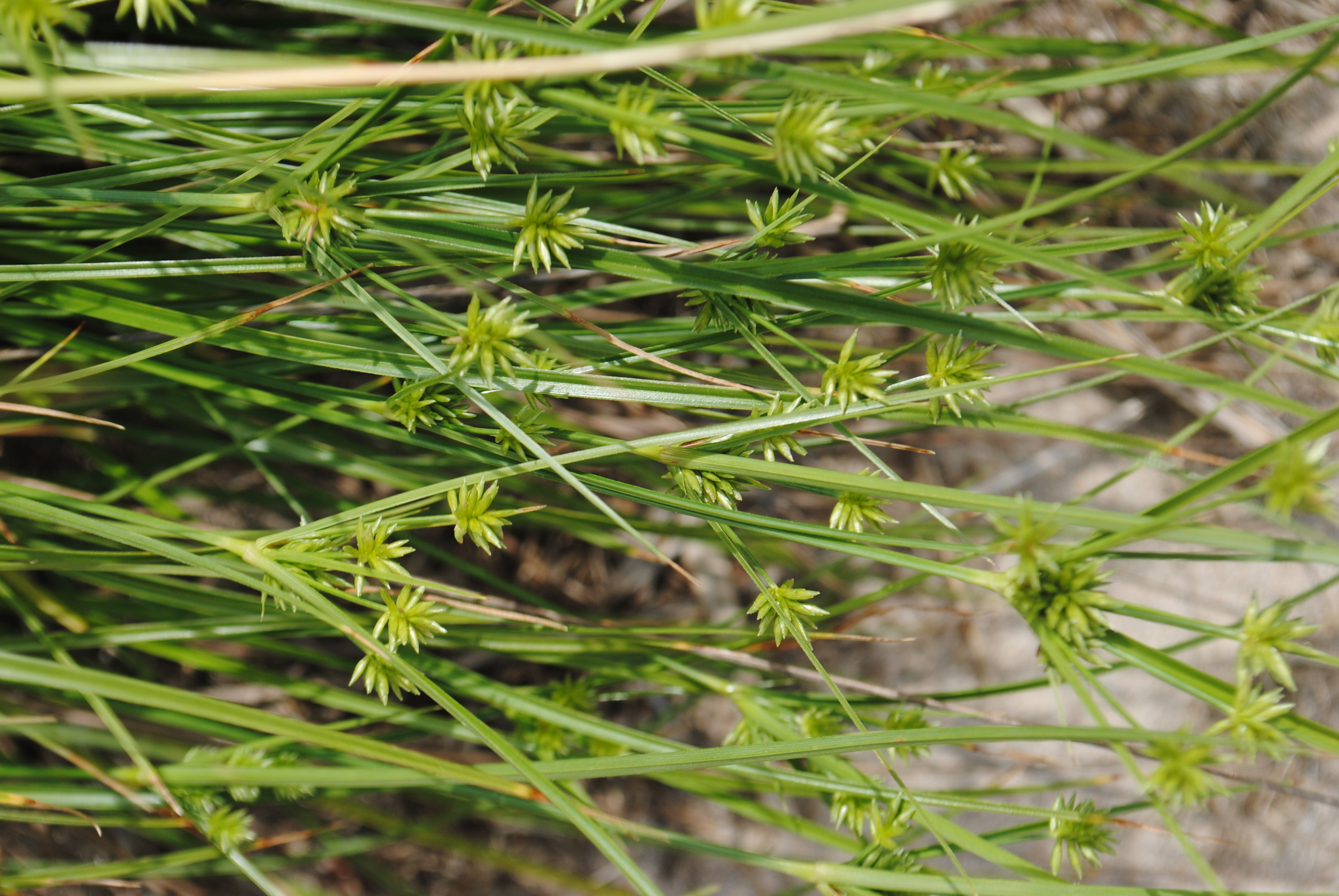
- In New York

Conservation status
- Least Concern (IUCN 3.1)

Scientific classification
- Kingdom: Plantae
- Clade: Embryophytes
- Clade: Tracheophytes
- Clade: Spermatophytes
- Clade: Angiosperms
- Clade: Monocots
- Clade: Commelinids
- Order: Poales
- Family: Cyperaceae
- Genus: Cyperus
- Species: C. grayi

Binomial name
- Cyperus grayi Torr.

= Cyperus grayi =

Species of sedge

Cyperus grayi, commonly known as Gray's flatsedge, is a species of sedge that is native to south eastern parts of the United States.

== Description ==
Gray's flatsedge is a perennial herb. It grows typically in dry, sandy soil in coastal plains.

== Taxonomy ==
Cyperus grayi was named and described by the American botanist John Torrey in 1836. Torrey referred to this species as Gray's galingale. As of February 2026, the botanical name Cyperus grayi Torr. is widely accepted.

== See also ==
- List of Cyperus species

== Bibliography ==
- Torrey, John (1836). "Monograph of the North American Cyperaceae". Annals of the Lyceum of Natural History of New York. 3: 239–448.
- Torrey, John (1843). Flora of the State of New York. Vol. 2. Albany: Carroll and Cook.
