= Irynachet =

Irynachet (fl. c. 2200 BC) was an ancient Egyptian physician living at the very end of the Old Kingdom or the First Intermediate Period. Irynachet is only known from a false door found at Giza and reused as cover for a shaft tomb (excavation no. S 2065). Irynachet bears on the false door several rare titles. He was senior physician of the great house, physician of the belly of the great house, protector of the anus and physician of the eyes of the great house. These titles attest a high specialization in medicine already in the Old Kingdom. Irynachet was also called Iry, a short version of his longer name. His good name was Ny-ankh-Pepy.
