= Peseshet =

Female physician in ancient Egypt

p s S t
Peseshet
psš.t
in hieroglyphs
Era: Old Kingdom
(2686–2181 BC)

Peseshet, who lived under the Fourth Dynasty of ancient Egypt (albeit a date in the Fifth Dynasty is also possible), is often credited with being the earliest known female physician in history. Some have credited Merit-Ptah with being the first female physician, but she is likely a fictional creation based upon Peseshet. Peseshet’s relevant title was "lady overseer of the female physicians," but whether she was a physician herself is uncertain. She also had the titles king's acquaintance, and overseer of funerary-priests of the king's mother.

She is believed to have had a son Akhethetep, in whose mastaba at Giza her personal false door was found. However, the mother-son relation of Akhethetep and Peseshet is not confirmed by any inscription. On the false door is also depicted a man called Kanefer. He might be her husband. Akhethetep and Kanefer were both high-ranking individuals who lived during the fourth dynasty of Egypt and served as officers.

She may have graduated midwives at an ancient Egyptian medical school in Sais.

Peseshet is a basic hero in a novel "The doctor-accoucheur" by Sofeiya.

== Storm Cycle ==
Peseshet's history plays a key role in the 2009 novel Storm Cycle by Roy and Iris Johansen, which tells the story of an archaeologist seeking to obtain and sell cures and treatments that the novel's Peseshet is said to have discovered, and of a researcher whose only hope of saving her sister may lie in one of those cures.

== Merit-Ptah ==
In 1938, Kate Campbell Hurd-Mead wrote of an ancient Egyptian female physician named Merit-Ptah. Her writings about Merit-Ptah were nearly identical to the facts of Peseshet’s life as discovered in Akhethetep’s tomb, with only Peseshet’s name and location of the tomb changed. It is unclear where Hurd-Mead got the name Merit-Ptah, but it is possible that she was inspired by Merit-Ptah the wife of Ramose.
