= Djedmaatesankh =

Ancient Egyptian musician

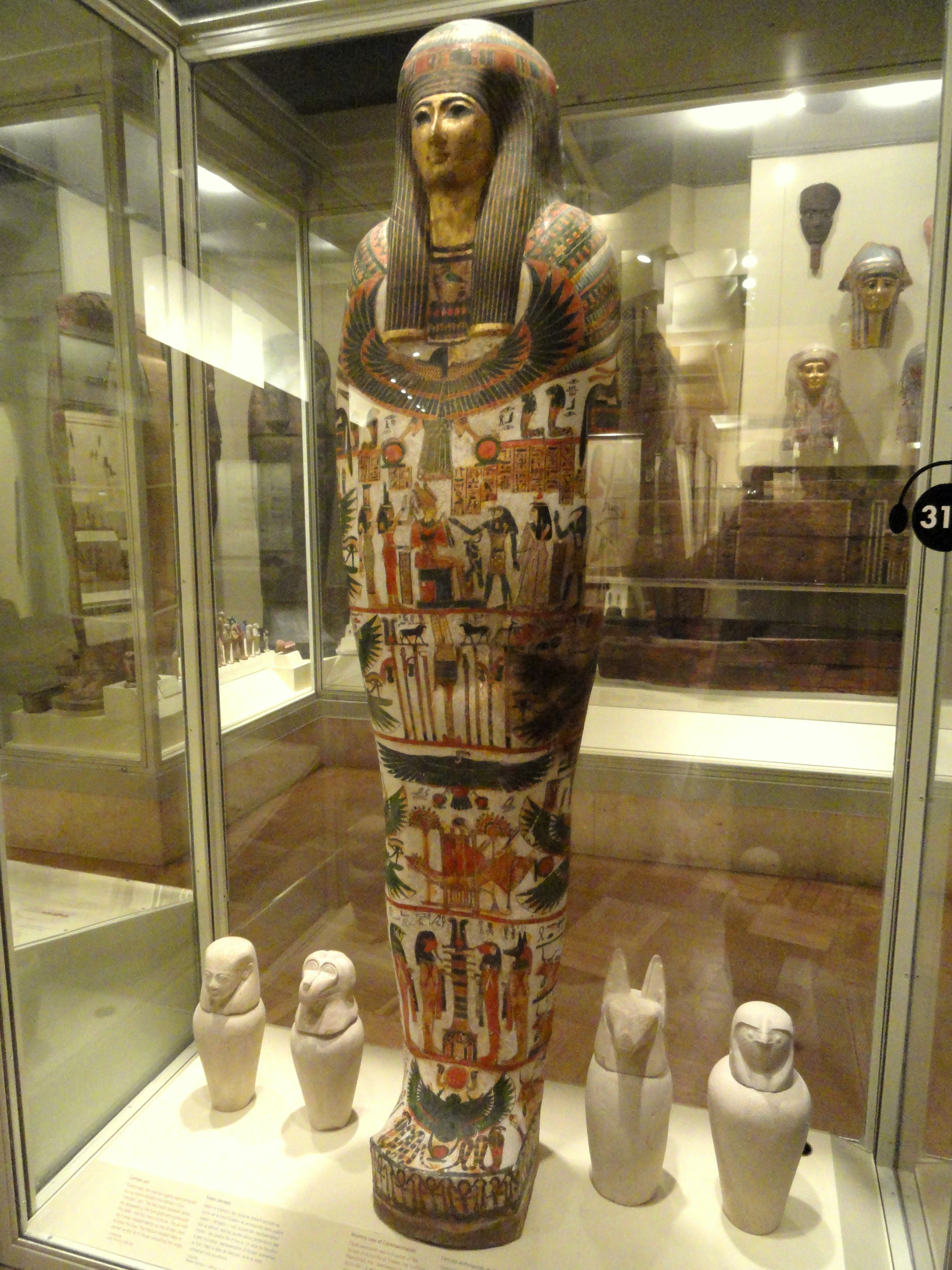
- The Mummy of Djedmaatesankh at the Royal Ontario Museum in Galleries of Africa: Egypt

Djedmaatesankh was an Egyptian woman from the city of Thebes (modern Luxor) who died in the middle of the 9th century B.C. She was an ordinary middle-class woman and musician. Her cartonnage coffin is thought to have been buried on the west bank of the Nile about 2,850 years ago. The coffin and mummy of the lady Djedmaatesankh are part of the permanent collection of the Royal Ontario Museum in the Galleries of Africa: Egypt. The coffin was collected and brought to the Royal Ontario Museum by Dr. Charles Trick Currelly, the museum's first director, in the early 20th century. Notably, the cartonnage of Djedmaatesankh is one of the best preserved of its period.

== Life ==
Her cartonnage lists her husband's name as Pa-ankh-entef, which translates to "Life belongs to him (or "his)". In 2009, (at Scholars’ Colloquium Days on November 7), Gayle Gibson, Rom Teacher & Egyptologist, and Stephanie Holowka, Technician at the Hospital for Sick Children in Toronto, presented evidence to support a theory that Paankhemamun, a mummy on display in the Art Institute of Chicago, is the husband of Djedmaatesankh. Gibson cited that the iconography on the two coffins are very similar and that Pa-ankh-entef would be an acceptable short form of Pa-ankh-en-amun. Holowka noted that scans that she performed showed that there were "peculiarities in the mummification process that the mummies also shared."

The scan performed by Holowka also revealed that it is unlikely that Djedmaatesankh had any children as her pubic bone was perfectly intact. Dr. Peter Lewin, a pediatrician at the Hospital for Sick Children in Toronto and researcher in the field of paleopathology, led the team that Holowka was a part of, and notes that it is possible that Djedmaatesankh was infertile. He suggests that as a married woman of her age (scans show bone fusion and wear on her teeth indicate her age as 30–35) it was customary for most Egyptian women to have already had several children.

== Death ==
CT-scans performed on the body of Djedmaatesankh (in 1978 and 1994) have shown that she likely died of a dental abscess, which upon erupting, may have led to a fatal blood infection. The results of the scan show a swelling of her left upper jaw, and a 3D image inside her skull revealed a dental abscess, approximately one inch in diameter, which was caused by a diseased upper left incisor. It is likely that the abscess was there for several weeks prior to erupting and that the infection had spread to her upper left jaw bone, as the scan indicated that the bone was pitted with small holes. Additionally, high-resolution scans show tracks on the jawbone that are believed to be a result of unsuccessful attempts to drain the abscess.

After death, her body was eviscerated through a diagonal incision in the left inguinal region. Five linen-wrapped packages which probably contain her mummified organs are present in the body cavity; her heart is not present in the chest and is likely in one of these packages. Her lower torso is stuffed with fabric. Her embalming incision is not stitched but it covered with a metal plate. Her wrappings contain several amulets on the front of the abdomen: they take the form of a scarab; a pectoral in the shape of a falcon, winged scarab, sun disc, or uraeus; and a djed-pillar.
