= Edwin Smith Papyrus =

Ancient Egyptian medical text

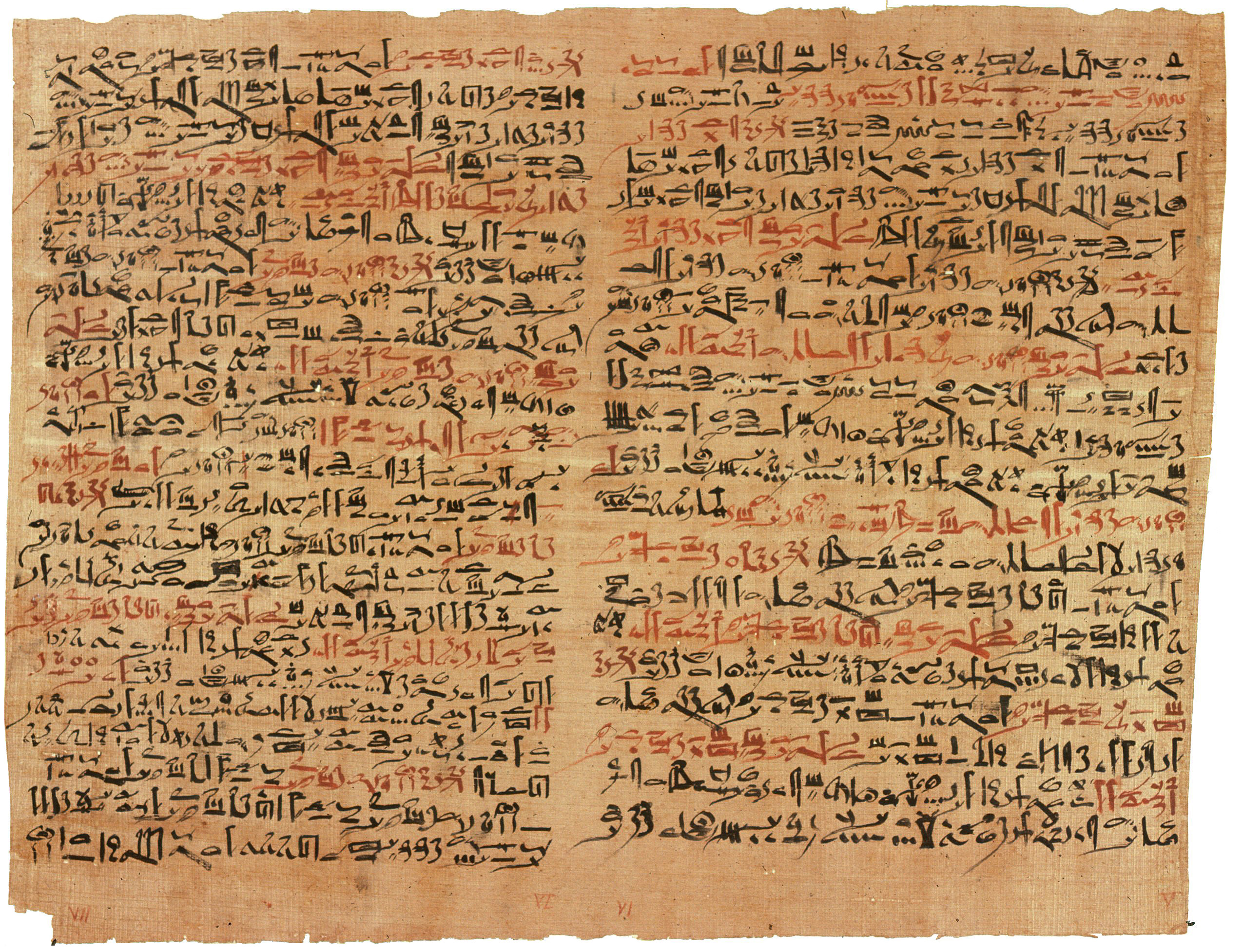
- Plates vi & vii of the Edwin Smith Papyrus at the Rare Book Room, New York Academy of Medicine
- Size: length: 4.68 meters
- Created: c. 1600 BC
- Discovered: Egypt
- Present location: New York City, New York, United States

The Edwin Smith Papyrus is an ancient Egyptian medical text, named after Edwin Smith who bought it in 1862, and the oldest known surgical treatise on trauma. This document, which may have been a manual of military surgery, describes 48 cases of injuries, fractures, wounds, dislocations and tumors.

It is unique among the surviving Egyptian medical papyri because it presents a rational and scientific approach to medicine in ancient Egypt and avoids prescribing magic. This copy dates to Dynasties 16–17 of the Second Intermediate Period in ancient Egypt, c. 1600 BCE but the original may date from the Old Kingdom.

== Papyrus ==
The papyrus is a scroll 4.68 meters or 15.3 feet in length. The recto (front side) has 377 lines in 17 columns, while the verso (backside) has 92 lines in five columns. Aside from the fragmentary outer column of the scroll, the remainder of the papyrus is intact, although it was cut into one-column pages some time in the 20th century. It is written right-to-left in hieratic, the Egyptian cursive form of hieroglyphs, in black ink with explanatory glosses in red ink. The vast majority of the papyrus is concerned with trauma and surgery, with short sections on gynaecology and cosmetics on the verso. On the recto side, there are 48 cases of injury. Each case details the type of the injury, examination of the patient, diagnosis and prognosis, and treatment. The verso side consists of eight magic spells and five prescriptions. The spells of the verso side and two incidents in Case 8 and Case 9 are the exceptions to the practical nature of this medical text. Generic spells and incantations may have been used as a last resort in terminal cases.

== Authorship ==
Authorship of the Edwin Smith Papyrus is debated. The majority of the papyrus was written by one scribe, with only small sections copied by a second scribe. The papyrus ends abruptly in the middle of a line, without any inclusion of an author. It is believed that the papyrus is an incomplete copy of an older reference manuscript from the Old Kingdom, evidenced by archaic grammar, terminology, form and commentary. James Henry Breasted speculates - but emphasises that this is pure conjecture based on no evidence - that the original author might be Imhotep, an architect, high priest, and physician of the Old Kingdom, c. 2700–2200 BCE.

== Procedure ==
The rational and practical nature of the papyrus is illustrated in 48 case histories, which are listed according to each organ. Presented cases are typical, not individual. The papyrus begins by addressing injuries to the head, and continues with treatments for injuries to neck, arms and torso, detailing injuries in descending anatomical order like a modern anatomical exposition. The title of each case details the nature of trauma, such as "Practices for a gaping wound in his head, which has penetrated to the bone and split the skull". The objective examination process included visual and olfactory clues, palpation and taking of the pulse. Following the examination are the diagnosis and prognosis, where the physician judges the patient’s chances of survival and makes one of three diagnoses: "An ailment which I will treat," "An ailment with which I will contend," or "An ailment not to be treated". Last, treatment options are offered. In many of the cases, explanations of trauma are included to provide further clarity.

A i s Aa3
the brain or skull
in hieroglyphs
Era: 2nd Intermediate Period
(1650–1550 BC)

Among the treatments are closing wounds with sutures (for wounds of the lip, throat, and shoulder), bandaging, splints, poultices, preventing and curing infection with honey, and stopping bleeding with raw meat. Immobilization is advised for head and spinal cord injuries, as well as other lower body fractures. The papyrus also describes realistic anatomical, physiological and pathological observations. It contains the first known descriptions of the cranial structures, the meninges, the external surface of the brain, the cerebrospinal fluid, and the intracranial pulsations. The procedures of this papyrus demonstrate an Egyptian level of knowledge of medicines that surpassed that of Hippocrates, who lived 1000 years later, and the documented rationale for diagnosis and treatment of spinal injuries can still be regarded as the state-of-the-art reasoning for modern clinical practice. The influence of brain injuries on parts of the body is recognized, such as paralysis. The relationship between the location of a cranial injury and the side of the body affected is also recorded, while crushing injuries of vertebrae were noted to impair motor and sensory functions. Due to its practical nature and the types of trauma investigated, it is believed that the papyrus served as a textbook for the trauma that resulted from military battles.

== History ==
The Edwin Smith Papyrus dates to Dynasties 16–17 of the Second Intermediate Period. Egypt was ruled from Thebes during this time and the papyrus is likely to have originated from there. Edwin Smith, an American Egyptologist, purchased it in Luxor, Egypt in 1862, from an Egyptian dealer named Mustafa Agha.

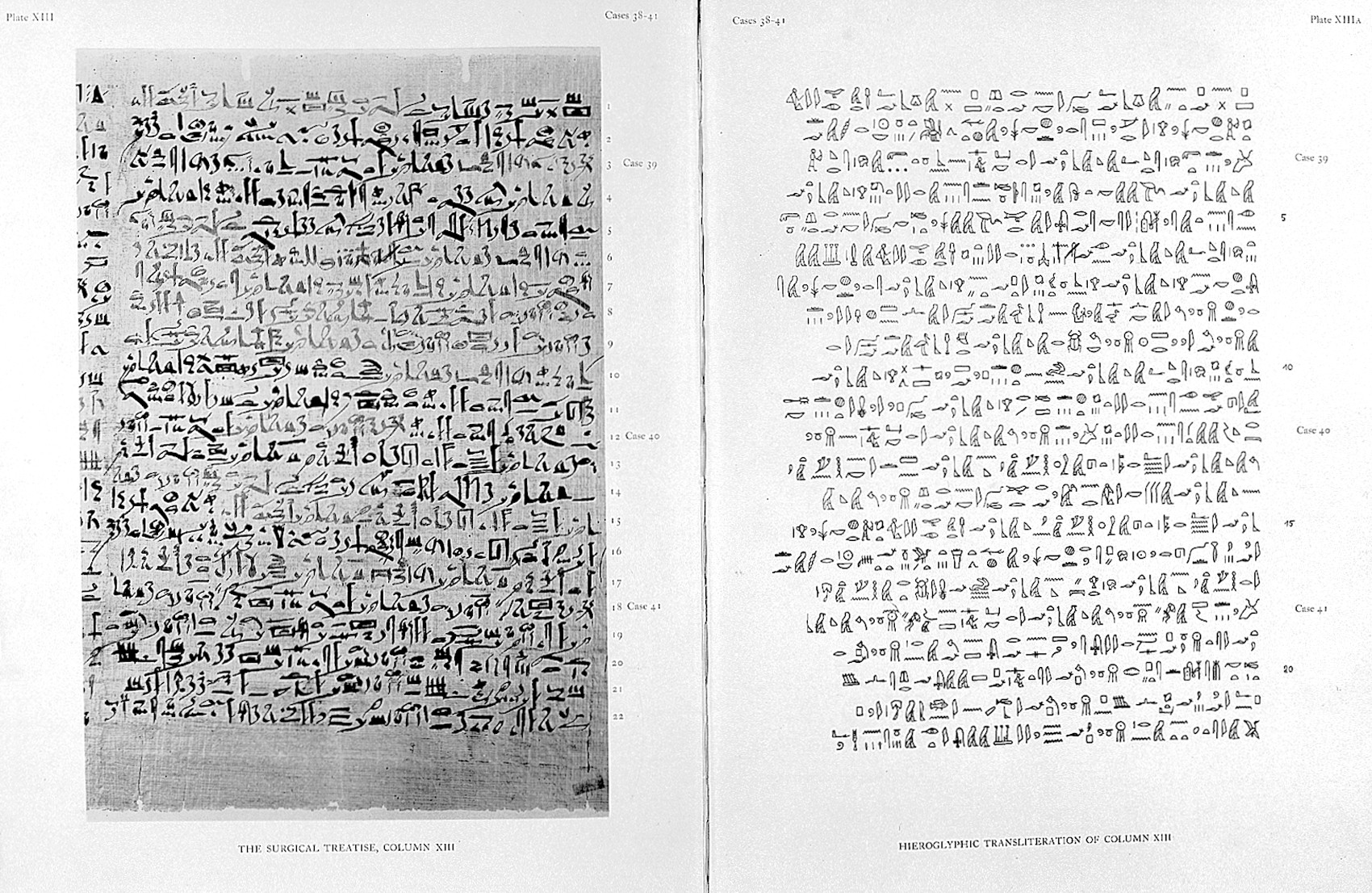
The Breasted edition (1930): left page photograph of the original papyrus, right page transcription of hieroglyphics. This is Plate XIII (column 13, case 38-41)

The papyrus was in the possession of Smith until his death, when his daughter donated the papyrus to New York Historical Society. There its importance was recognized by Caroline Ransom Williams, who wrote to James Henry Breasted in 1920 about "the medical papyrus of the Smith collection" in hopes that he could work on it. He completed the first translation of the papyrus in 1930, with the medical advice of Dr. Arno B. Luckhardt. Breasted’s translation changed the understanding of the history of medicine. It demonstrates that Egyptian medical care was not limited to the magical modes of healing demonstrated in other Egyptian medical sources. Rational, scientific practices were used, constructed through observation and examination.

From 1938 through 1948, the papyrus was at the Brooklyn Museum. In 1948, the New York Historical Society and the Brooklyn Museum presented the papyrus to the New York Academy of Medicine, where it remains today.

From 2005 through 2006, the Edwin Smith Papyrus was on exhibition at the Metropolitan Museum of Art in New York. James P. Allen, curator of Egyptian Art at the museum, published a new translation of the work, coincident with the exhibition. This was the first complete English translation since Breasted’s in 1930. This translation offers a more modern understanding of hieratic and medicine.

== List of cases ==
As listed in

- Head (27 cases, the first incomplete)
  - Skull, overlying soft tissue and brain, Cases 1-10.
  - Nose, Cases 11-14.
  - Maxillary region, Cases 15-17.
  - Temporal region, Cases 18-22.
  - Ears, mandible, lips and chin, Cases 23-27.
- Throat and Neck (Cervical Vertebrae), Cases 28-33.
- Clavicle, Cases 34-35.
- Humerus, Cases 36-38.
- Sternum, Overlying Soft Tissue, and True Ribs, Cases 39-46.
- Shoulders, Case 47.
- Spinal Column, Case 48 (incomplete).

== See also ==
- List of ancient Egyptian papyri
- Ancient Egyptian medicine
- Medical literature

== Bibliography ==
- Martin, Andrew J. (2005-07-27). "Academy Papyrus to be Exhibited at the Metropolitan Museum of Art" (Press release). The New York Academy of Medicine. Archived from the original on November 27, 2010.
- Allen, James P. (2005). The Art of Medicine in Ancient Egypt. New York/New Haven: The Metropolitan Museum of Art/Yale University Press. ISBN 978-0-300-10728-9. LCCN 2005016908.
- Breasted, James Henry (1991) [First published 1930]. The Edwin Smith Surgical Papyrus: published in facsimile and hieroglyphic transliteration with translation and commentary in two volumes. University of Chicago Oriental Institute Publications, v. 3–4. Chicago: University of Chicago Press. ISBN 978-0-918986-73-3. LCCN 31007705.
- Ghalioungui, Paul (1965) [First published 1963]. Magic and Medical Science in Ancient Egypt. New York: Barnes & Noble. LCCN 65029851.
- Der medizinische Papyrus Edwin Smith: The New York Academy of Medicine, Inv. 217: Neu in Hieroglyphen übertragen, übersetzt und bearbeitet (in German). Translated by Kosack, Wolfgang. Berlin: Christoph Brunner Verlag Basel. 2011. ISBN 978-3-033-03331-3. LCCN 2013402815.
- Nunn, John F. (1996). Ancient Egyptian Medicine. Vol. 113. Norman, Oklahoma: University of Oklahoma Press. pp. 57–68. ISBN 978-0-8061-2831-3. LCCN 95039770. PMID 10326089.
- Sullivan, Richard (August 1996). "The Identity and Work of the Ancient Egyptian Surgeon". Journal of the Royal Society of Medicine. 89 (8). SAGE Publications: 467–473. doi:10.1177/014107689608900813. PMC 1295891. PMID 8795503.
- Wilkins, Robert H. (March 1964). "Neurosurgical Classic-XVII (Edwin Smith Surgical Papyrus)". Journal of Neurosurgery. 21 (3): 240–244. doi:10.3171/jns.1964.21.3.0240. PMID 14127631. Archived from the original on 5 February 2020. translation of 13 cases from Breasted, James Henry (1930) pertaining to injuries of the skull and spinal cord, with commentary.
