= Instruction of Ankhsheshonq =

The Instruction of Ankhsheshonq (or Ankhsheshonqy) is an Ancient Egyptian papyrus that has been tentatively dated to the Ptolemaic period, although the content may be earlier in origin. It contains an introductory narrative and a list of maxims on many topics, its style has been described as pragmatic and humorous. The papyrus was obtained in 1896 by the British Museum (papyrus #10508).

It is twenty-eight pages long, with major damage on pages 1–2 and 24–28.

== Sources ==
- Lichtheim, Miriam (2006). Ancient Egyptian Literature: The Late Period. University of California Press. Pages 159–180.
