= Medunefer =

Ancient Egyptian physician

Medunefer (fl. c. 2500 BC) was an ancient Egyptian eye-physician who lived in the Old Kingdom. Medunefer is only known from his mastaba excavated by Selim Hassan in Giza. This mastaba is a simple rectangular block with just a small inner chapel. The only decorated part that survived is a door lintel showing Medunefer sitting. There is also a short inscription listing Medunefer's titles. According to the text, he was king's acquaintance, master of the secrets of the palace, leader of the eye physicians of the palace and physician of the palace. There is not much else known about him. A more precise dating is not possible as of now.
