= Brugsch Papyrus =

Medical papyrus

- Berlin Papyrus Collection
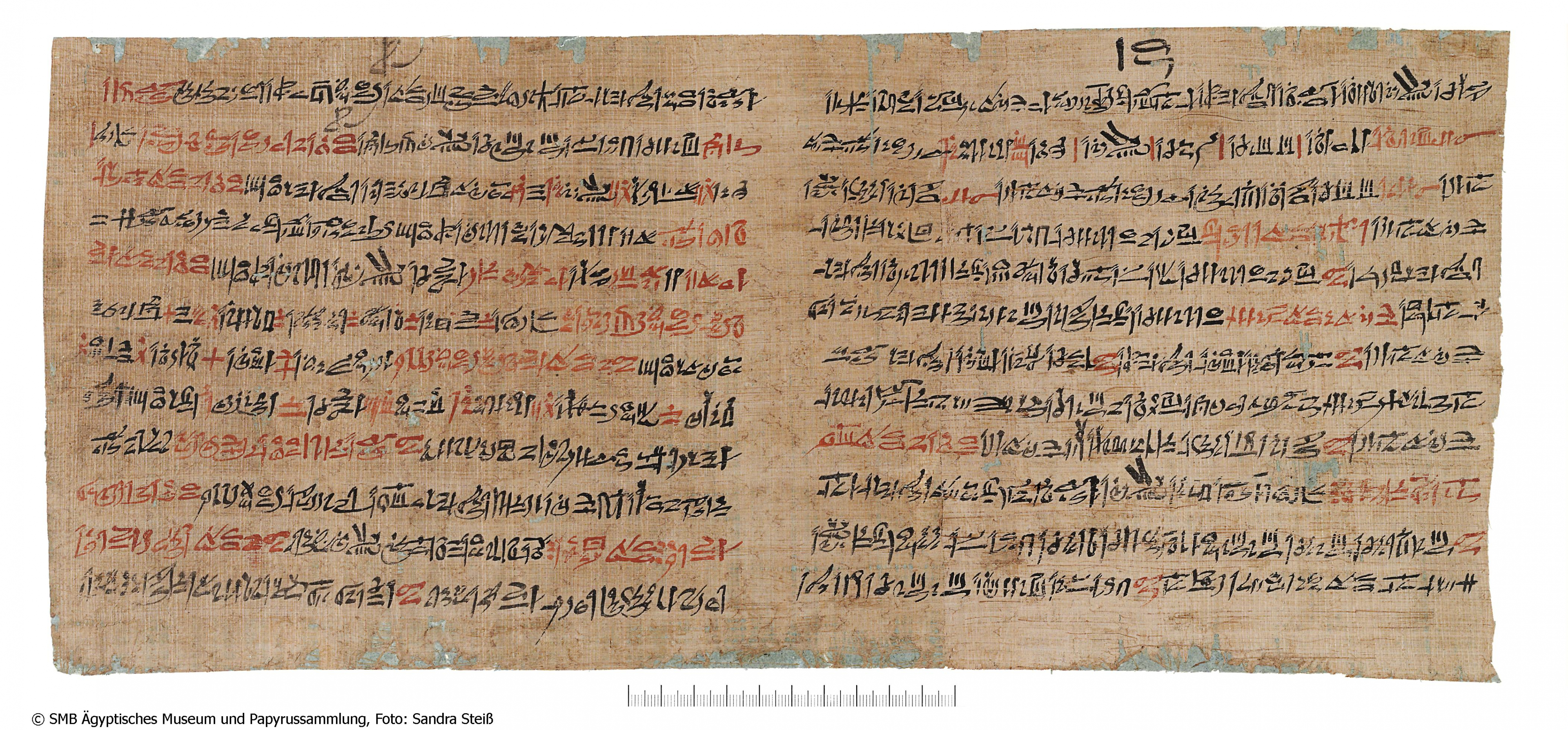
- Picture E of the papyrus
- Also known as: Papyrus Berlin 3038
- Type: Medical papyrus
- Date: Nineteenth Dynasty of Egypt
- Place of origin: Saqqara, Egypt
- Language: Hieratic
- Material: papyrus
- Format: roll

The Brugsch Papyrus (Papyrus Berlin 3038), also known as the Greater Berlin Papyrus or simply Berlin Papyrus, is an important ancient Egyptian medical papyrus. It was discovered by Giuseppe Passalacqua in Saqqara, Egypt.

Frederick William IV of Prussia acquired it in 1827 for the Berlin Museum, where it is still housed. The style of writing is that of the 19th Dynasty, and it is dated between 1350 and 1200 BC.

The papyrus was studied initially by Heinrich Karl Brugsch, but was translated and published by Walter Wreszinski in 1909. Only a German translation is available.

The papyrus contains twenty-four pages of writing. Much of it is parallel to the Ebers Papyrus. Some of the contents deals with contraception and fertility tests. Some historians believe that this papyrus was used by Galen in his writings.

== Bibliography ==
- Wreszinski, Walter (1909). Der grosse medizinische Papyrus des Berliner Museums (Pap. Berl. 3038) (in German). Leipzig: J. C. Hinrichs. LCCN 93627458.
- Willerson, James T.; Teaff, Rebecca (1996). "Egyptian Contributions to Cardiovascular Medicine". Texas Heart Institute Journal. 23 (3): 191–200. PMC 325346. PMID 8885101.
