= Qar (doctor) =

- Born: c. 2350 BC
- Died: c. 2300 BC (aged c. 50)
- Burial place: Badrashin, Giza, Egypt

Qar (c. 2350 BC – c. 2300 BC) was a doctor during the Sixth Dynasty of Egypt, which lasted from about 2350 to 2180 BC. He was the royal physician.

Adil Hussein discovered his tomb north of the pyramid of Sekhemkhet in 2001. Qar died around the age of 50 and his mummified remains were discovered by archaeologists in December 2006 in his mastaba at Saqqara, Egypt. As with many other tombs in Saqqara, his tomb was re-used several times.

Beside his mummy in the limestone sarcophagus, there were metal (bronze or copper) model tools that were entombed alongside his remains. In press reports following the discovery of the tomb and in several publications, they are regarded as surgical instruments. It was stated that they might be the oldest surgical tools in the world. However, these types of model tools are common in many Old Kingdom burials of officials with different functions. They are not surgical instruments. They are model tools. They, his mummy and the rest of the findings are in the Imhotep Museum at Saqqara.
