= Arno Benedict Luckhardt =

American medical researcher (1885–1957)

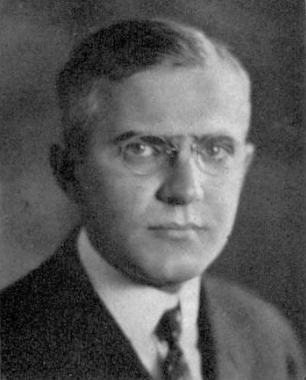
- Arno Benedict Luckhardt
- Born: 26 August 1885; Chicago, Illinois, US
- Died: 6 November 1957 (aged 72); Miami Beach, Florida, US
- Education: University of Chicago
- Scientific career
- Fields: Dentistry

Arno Benedict Luckhardt (1885–1957) was an American physician and medical researcher.

== Biography ==
He was born to Gustav Albert August Luckhardt and Aurelia (Weber) Luckhardt in Chicago, Illinois, on 26 August 1885. He married Luella Catherine (LaBolle) Luckhardt. He died on 6 November 1957 at age 72 in Dade, Florida, United States. His obituary was published in the New York Times.

== Education ==
He completed his BS degree at the University of Chicago. He completed his PhD and MD degrees at the Rush Medical College.

== Career ==
His entire professional life was spent at the University of Chicago where he started as an assistant in bacteriology and rose up through the ranks to ultimately become a professor at the department.

== Awards and honours ==
He was nominated for the Nobel Prize in Physiology in 1928, although he did not ultimately win that award.

He was an honorary member of the American Dental Association and he served on the council of American Physiological Society.

== See also ==
- Nobel Prize in Physiology or Medicine
- University of Chicago
