= Papyrus Carlsberg Collection =

The Papyrus Carlsberg Collection is a collection of Egyptian papyri in the possession of the University of Copenhagen. It was founded in the early 1930s by Prof H. O. Lange with the help of funds from the Carlsberg Foundation. The majority of the documents were purchased between 1931 and 1938. Later on, in 1939, the foundation, with the consent of the Ministry of Education and the headmaster, presented its collection in the University of Copenhagen.

== History ==
After being founded in the 1930s, the collection was expanded with a series of purchases from 1931 to 1938. Afterwards, the collection was situated in the Egyptological department as a part of the Carsten Niebuhr Department of the Institute of Cross-Cultural and Regional Studies in Denmark.

Papyri text of the Carlsberg collection

In 1954, Aksel Volten, who was the keeper of the collection at the time from 1943 to 1968, substantially grew the collection by acquiring other documents, which was all funded by the Carlsberg Foundation.

In 2003, the demotic and hieratic papyri were transferred in the papyrus collection of the Greek and Latin department of the university, and the Papyrus Haunienses Collection was transferred to the Papyrus Carlsberg Collection.

== Contents ==
The Carlsberg Papyrus Collection includes more than 500 papyri and a very large amount of uncatalogued material. The main source of the papyri are the purchased documents by the Carlsberg Foundation and the secondary large source are the papyri that came in possession of Prof. H. O. Lange. The majority of the writings consist of demotic and hieratic texts, most of Roman date, with several hundred manuscripts belonging to the Tebtunis temple library.

The collection claims that:

"As of August 2015, 925 individual manuscripts have been inventoried, some of which have been pieced together from dozens or even hundreds of fragments. Altogether these manuscripts represent more than 2,500 fragments which have been studied and sorted over many years. The collection still includes thousands of fragments that remain to be sorted and identified."

The main topics found in the papyri so far are regarding astronomy, astrology, mathematics, cosmology, a herbal, a legal manual, a few onomastica, world lists and grammatical texts, dream interpretation, and others.

Other interesting contents are the Teaching of King Merikare, which was purchased from Ludwig Borchardt for the collection, two Coptic codices, brought in after being purchased from Carl Schmidt and a few papyri which came from the possession of Prof. Sander-Hansen. The majority of the documents are yet to be translated but leading Egyptologists believe that doing so would greatly expand the current knowledge in terms of ancient medicine, astronomy, botany, astrology and other scientific fields, practiced in Ancient Egypt.

=== Carlsberg Papyrus VIII ===
The Carlsberg papyrus 8 is an ancient Egyptian medical papyrus written in hieratic. The recto concerns eye diseases and the verso deals with birth prognoses (how to determine whether a woman is pregnant; how to determine the sex of the child). The recto text dates to the 18th Dynasty (c. 1500 BCE), while the verso was recorded several generations later (c. 1400 BCE). The papyrus is one of very few medical texts surviving from pharaonic Egypt.

While similar to the Kahun and Berlin Papyrus, Carlsburg papyrus 8 goes into much more detail on pregnancy, covering methods such as determining whether or not a woman will give birth through the use of hippopotamus excrement. Carlsberg Papyrus 8 sheds light on how women will conceive and whether or not they will conceive, using garlic. This garlic is used as an indicator once properly placed in the body of a woman.

The verso was published in 1939 by Erik Iversen., and the recto in 2024. Iversen dated the papyrus as follows: "They are inscribed on both sides in two different hands, most probably dating from the time about the 19—20th dynasty."

=== Carlsberg Papyrus XIII ===
The Dream Book of the Carlsberg papyrus XIII claims that "If a woman dreams that a woman has intercourse with her, she will come to a bad end". Its translation into German was published in 1942 by Aksel Volten.

== See also ==
- List of ancient Egyptian papyri
- History of medicine
- Papyrology
