= Hearst Expedition =

Archaeological expedition

The Hearst Expedition was an archaeological project led by the University of California to explore burial grounds in and around Qift, Egypt. The expedition spanned the years 1899–1905 for Phoebe Hearst, the mother of William Randolph Hearst and the benefactor who funded it. George A. Reisner directed the expedition, and is credited with some of its most important finds, including the stela of Prince Wepemnofret and the Hearst Medical Papyrus.
