= Hearst papyrus =

Papyrus for medical purposes

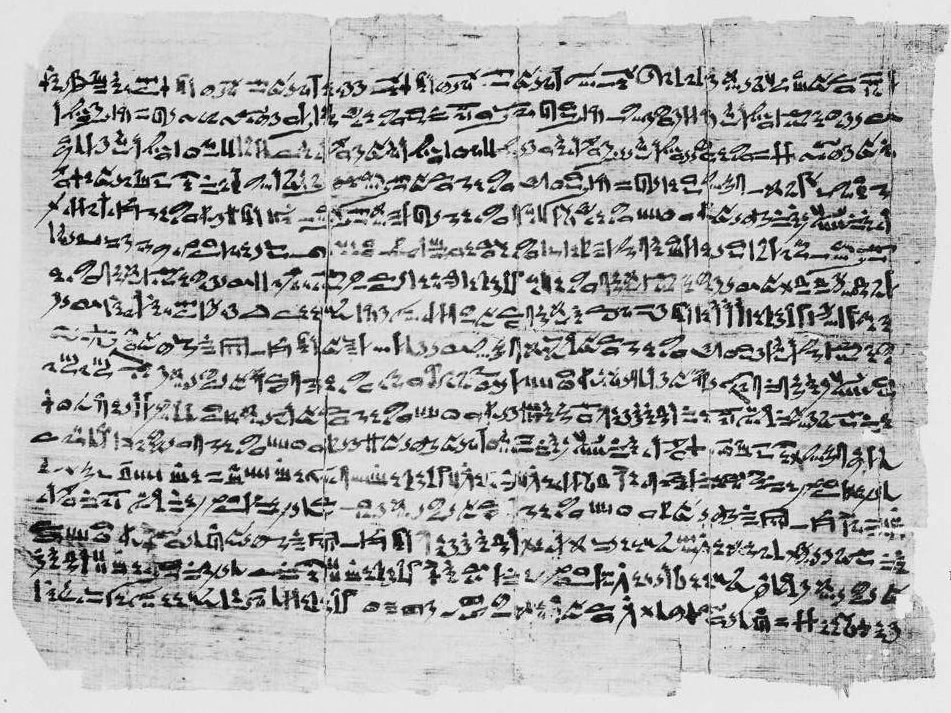
- Created: c. 1450 BC
- Discovered: spring 1901; Egypt
- Present location: Berkeley, California, United States

The Hearst Papyrus, also called the Hearst Medical Papyrus, is one of the medical papyri of ancient Egypt. It was named after Phoebe Hearst. The papyrus contains 18 pages of medical prescriptions written in hieratic Egyptian writing, concentrating on treatments for problems dealing with the urinary system, blood, hair, and bites. It is dated to the first half of the 2nd millennium BC. It is considered an important manuscript, but some doubts persist about its authenticity.

== Origin ==
According to George Reisner (who published plates of the papyrus in 1905), the Hearst Papyrus was received in the spring of 1901 at the camp of the Hearst Expedition in Egypt from a peasant of the nearby village of Deir el-Ballas, as a thank-you for being allowed to take fertilizer from their dump-heaps. It was later named after Phoebe Hearst (the mother of William Randolph Hearst, the newspaper magnate) who funded much of that expedition carried out by the University of California.

The papyrus has been dated to the 18th Dynasty of Egypt, around the time of pharaoh Tuthmosis III. The text is believed to have been composed earlier, during the Middle Kingdom, around 2000 BC. As of 2007, it is kept in the Bancroft Library, University of California, Berkeley.

In later years, some doubts have been raised about its authenticity. The contents of the papyrus have been studied extensively from the published plates, but the original papyrus had never been carefully examined. As its curator explained in 2003, "the papyrus is in surprisingly good condition. It is almost too good to be true." On the other hand, Reisner had no doubts, writing in 1905, "The roll had not been opened since antiquity as was manifest in the set of the turns, the fine dust, and the casts of insects." To settle the matter, the Bancroft Library has expressed its intention to have the papyrus examined at some point in the future to establish "whether it is indeed real or an almost perfect fake".

== Contents ==
The Hearst Papyrus is one of the medical papyri of ancient Egypt, which were used to record remedial methods for problems such as headaches and digestive problems. Most papyri also included a section on incantations and magic spells that would be performed on the patient before, during, and after treatment.

The Hearst Papyrus contains 260 paragraphs on 18 columns of medical prescriptions, written in hieratic Egyptian writing. The topics range from "a tooth which falls out" to "remedy for treatment of the lung", but concentrates on treatments for problems dealing with the urinary system, blood, hair, and bites (by human beings, pigs, and hippopotamuses). One incantation deals with the "Canaanite illness", "when the body is coal-black with charcoal spots", probably tularemia, one of the "plagues" that helped to unseat the Hyksos.

== See also ==
- List of ancient Egyptian papyri
- Ancient Egyptian medicine
- History of medicine
