= List of papyri from ancient Egypt =

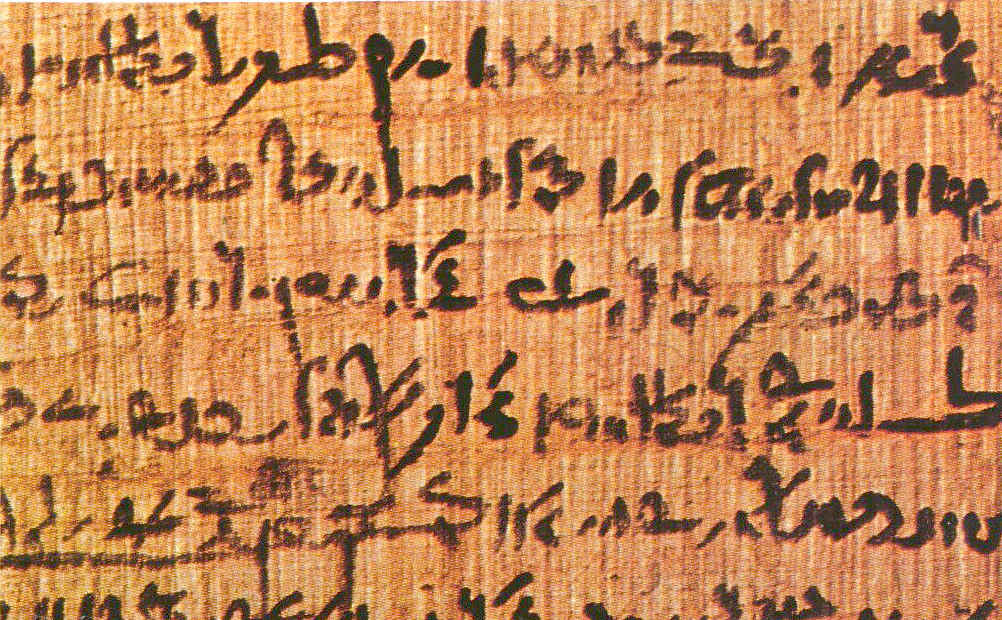
Photo of ancient papyrus document, showing vertical and horizontal striations from the strips of pith of the papyrus plant.

This list of papyri from ancient Egypt includes some of the better known individual papyri written in hieroglyphs, hieratic, demotic or in ancient Greek. Excluded are papyri found abroad or containing Biblical texts which are listed in separate lists.

The content descriptions are preceded by a letter in bold font, indicating the literary genre it belongs to. In the case of collections of texts of various kinds, the first letter refers to the most important text on the papyrus.

- **B** : biographical
- **D** : drawings: cartoons, maps
- **F** : funerary: Books of the Dead
- **L** : literary texts: tales, poems
- **O** : official records
- **P** : private papyri, correspondence, contracts
- **R** : religious, myths
- **S** : scientific: mathematical, medical
- **T** : teachings, instructions
- **W** : wordlists

| Name | Date: century BCE | Content | Institution | Ref # | City | Country |
|---|---|---|---|---|---|---|
| Diary of Merer | 26th | **O -** stone transport to the Great Pyramid of Giza | Egyptian Museum | | Cairo | Egypt |
| Abusir Papyri | 25th or later | **O -** about Neferirkare Kakai | | | | |
| Moscow Mathematical Papyrus | 21st | **S -** Mathematical problems and solutions | Pushkin State Museum of Fine Arts | | Moscow | Russia |
| Berlin Papyrus | 21st or later | **S -** Medical and mathematical topics | Egyptian Museum of Berlin | P. Berlin 6619 | Berlin | Germany |
| Dramatic Ramesseum Papyrus | 20th | **R -** Religious drama | British Museum | P. BM EA 10610,2 | London | UK |
| Westcar Papyrus | 20th | **L -** Tales of Magic | Egyptian Museum of Berlin | P. Berlin 3033 | Berlin | Germany |
| Heqanakht Papyri | 20th | **P -** Private Correspondence of Heqanakht | Metropolitan Museum of Art | 22.3 | New York City | United States |
| Papyrus Hermitage 1116A; Papyrus Moscow, Papyrus Carlsberg 6 | 20th or later | **T -** Instruction of Merikare | | | | |
| P. Leningrad 1115 | 20th or later | **L -** Tale of the shipwrecked sailor | Russian Museum | P. Leningrad 1115 | Moscow | Russia |
| Prisse Papyrus | 20th or later | **T -** Instruction addressed to Kagemni; The Maxims of Ptahhotep | Bibliothèque Nationale | | Paris | France |
| Papyrus Berlin 3023; Papyrus Berlin 3025; Papyrus Berlin 10499 | 20th or later | **L -** The Eloquent Peasant | | P. Berlin 3023; P. Berlin 3025; P. Berlin 10499 | Berlin | Germany |
| Papyrus Butler 527 | 20th or later | **L -** The Eloquent Peasant | British Museum | P. BM 10274 | London | UK |
| Papyrus Berlin 3024 | 20th or later | **L -** Dispute between a man and his Ba, Herdsman's Tale | | P. Berlin 3024 | Berlin | Germany |
| Hearst Papyrus | 20th or later | **S -** Medical texts | University of California, Berkeley | | Berkeley, CA | United States |
| Rhind Mathematical Papyrus | 19th or later | **S -** Mathematical problems and solutions | British Museum | pBM 10057, pBM 10058 | London | UK |
| Kahun Papyri | 19th | **S -** Mathematical and medical topics | University College London | | London | UK |
| Papyrus Berlin 3022 | 19th | **B (?)-** Story of Sinuhe | | P. Berlin 3022 | Berlin | Germany |
| Ramesseum medical papyri | 18th | **S -** Medical texts | | | | |
| Papyrus Boulaq 18 | 18th | **O** - palace administration | | | Cairo | Egypt |
| London Medical Papyrus | 18th | **S -** Medical texts | British Museum | pBM 10059 | London | UK |
| Reisner Papyrus | 18th | **O -** official records | | | | |
| Ipuwer Papyrus | 17th | **T -** The Admonitions of Ipuwer | Rijksmuseum van Oudheden | Papyrus Leiden I 344 | Leiden | Netherlands |
| Papyrus Golenischeff | 17th | **R -** Hymn to the Red Crown | | | | |
| Edwin Smith Papyrus | 16th or earlier | **S -** Medical | New York Academy of Medicine | | New York City | United States |
| Ebers Papyrus | 16th | **S -** Medical | University of Leipzig | | Leipzig | Germany |
| Millingen Papyrus (now lost) | 16th or later | **T -** Instructions of Amenemhat | | | | |
| Carlsberg Papyrus VIII | 15th (ca. 1400 BC) or later (perhaps Ramesside: 1292-1077 BC) | **S -** Medical texts | University of Copenhagen | VIII | Copenhagen | Denmark |
| Turin King List | 13th (1292-1077 BC; Ramesside) | **O -** Kinglist | Museo Egizio | | Turin | Italy |
| Instruction of Any | 13th or later (ca. 1250 BC) | **F -** Book of the Dead | British Museum | P. Boulaq 4 | Cairo | Egypt |
| Papyrus Sallier II | 13th or later | **T -** The Satire of the Trades | British Museum | | London | UK |
| Papyrus Anastasi I | 13th or later (1292-1077 BC; Ramesside) | **T -** Satirical letter | British Museum | pBM 10247 | London | UK |
| Papyrus Harris I | 12th (1155–1149 BC) | **O -** Lists of endowments | British Museum | P. BM 9999. | London | UK |
| Judicial Papyrus of Turin | 12th | **O -** Report on the Harem conspiracy against Ramesses III | | | | |
| Turin Papyrus Map | 12th (ca. 1150 BC) | **D -** Map | Museo Egizio | | Turin | Italy |
| Abbott Papyrus | 12th (ca. 1100 BC) | **O -** Investigation of crimes | British Museum | 10221 | London | UK |
| Leopold II and Amherst Papyrus | 12th (1113 BC) | **O -** Investigation of crimes | Musée d'arts | | Brussels | Belgium |
| Mayer Papyri | 12th and later (A: 1083-1080 BC; B: 1118 BC) | **O -** Investigation of crimes | World Museum | M11162, M11186 | Liverpool | UK |
| Chester Beatty Medical Papyrus | 12th | **S -** Medical texts | British Museum | | London | UK |
| Papyrus British Museum 10474 | 12th | **T -** Instructions of Amenemopet | British Museum | P. BM 10474 | London | UK |
| Papyrus Lansing | 12th | **T -** Schoolbook | British Museum | P. BM 9994 | London | UK |
| Papyrus Chester Beatty IV | 12th | **T -** The Immortality of Writers | British Museum | P. BM 10684 | London | UK |
| Papyrus D’Orbiney | 12th | **L -** Tale of Two Brothers | British Museum | P. BM 10183 | London | UK |
| Papyrus Chester Beatty II | 12th | **L -** Tale of Truth and Falsehood | British Museum | P. BM 10682 | London | UK |
| Papyrus Chester Beatty I | 12th | **L -** Love poetry The Contendings of Horus and Seth | | | | |
| Turin Erotic Papyrus | 12th (ca. 1150 BC) | **D -** Animal and erotic cartoons | | P. Turin 55001 | Turin | Italy |
| Papyrus Harris 500 | 12th or later | **L -** Tale of the doomed prince, The Taking of Joppa, love poems, the Harper's Song | British Museum | P. BM 10060 | London | UK |
| Papyrus Pushkin I | 12th or later | **L -** Moscow literary letter | | P. Pushkin I | | |
| Greenfield Papyrus | 11th | **F -** Book of the Dead | British Museum | BM EA 10554 | London | UK |
| Papyrus Moscow 120 | 11th or later | **L -** Story of Wenamun | | P. Moscow 120 | | |
| Papyrus Hood | 10th | **W -** Onomasticon of Amenope | British Museum | P. BM EA 10202 | London | UK |
| Papyrus Berlin 3048 | 8th | **P -** Marriage contract | | P. Berlin 3048 | Berlin | Germany |
| Papyrus Rylands 9 | 6th | **P -** The petition of Pediese | John Rylands Library | P. Rylands 9 | Manchester | UK |
| Brooklyn Papyrus | 5th (450 BC) | **S -** Medical texts | Brooklyn Museum | | Brooklyn | United States |
| Papyrus Bremner–Rhind | 4th | **R -** The Songs of Isis and Nephthys. | British Museum | P. BM 10188 | London | UK |
| British Museum Papyrus 10508 | 4th or later | **T -** Instruction of Ankhsheshonq | British Museum | P. BM 10508 | London | UK |
| Papyrus Berlin 3008 | 4th or later | **R -** The Lamentations of Isis and Nephthys | | P.Berlin 3008 | Berlin | Germany |
| Cairo Museum Papyrus No. 30646 | 4th or later | **L -** Setne I | Egyptian Museum | Cairo Museum Papyrus No. 30646 | Cairo | Egypt |
| Cairo Museum Papyrus No. 30692 | 4th or later | **L -** Setne I | Egyptian Museum | Cairo Museum Papyrus No. 30692 | Cairo | Egypt |
| Vienna Demotic Papyrus 6165 | 4th or later | **L -** Story-cycle of King Petubastis | | Vienna Demotic Papyrus 6165 | Vienna | Austria |
| Leiden Demotic Papyrus I 384 | 4th or later | **R -** The Myth of the Eye of the Sun | Rijksmuseum van Oudheden | P.Leid.Dem. I 384 | Leiden | Netherlands |
| Papyrus Milbank | 4th or later (332-30 BC) | **F -** Book of the Dead | Institute for the Study of Ancient Cultures | E10486 | Chicago | United States |
| Zenon Papyri | 3rd (250-230 BC) | O/P: legal and financial transactions, architectural descriptions | dispersed | | various | |
| Waziri Papyrus I | 3rd or later | **F -** Book of the Dead | Egyptian Museum | | Cairo | Egypt |
| Milan Papyrus | 3rd or later (ca. 220 BC) | **L -** Poetry in Greek | University of Milan | P.Mil.Vogl. VIII 309 | Milan | Italy |
| Insinger Papyrus | 1st or later | **T -** Instruction of Papyrus Insinger | Rijksmuseum van Oudheden | F 95 / 5.1 | Leiden | Netherlands |
| Dryton and Apollonia Archive | 1st or later (174-94 BCE; Ptolemaic) | **P -** family papers | dispersed | | | |
| Papyrus Bingen 45 | Before 23 February 33 BC | O/P: Letter and official ordinance possibly containing an autograph of Cleopatra | Egyptian Museum of Berlin | P.Bingen 45 or Papyrus Berlin 25239 | Berlin | Germany |
| British Museum Papyrus 604 | 1st AD (39 AD) | **L -** Setne II | British Museum | P. BM 604 | London | UK |

== See also ==
- Amherst papyri
- Elephantine papyri
- List of New Testament papyri
- Oxyrhynchus Papyri
- Saite Oracle Papyrus
