= Kahun Gynaecological Papyrus =

Ancient Egyptian medical text

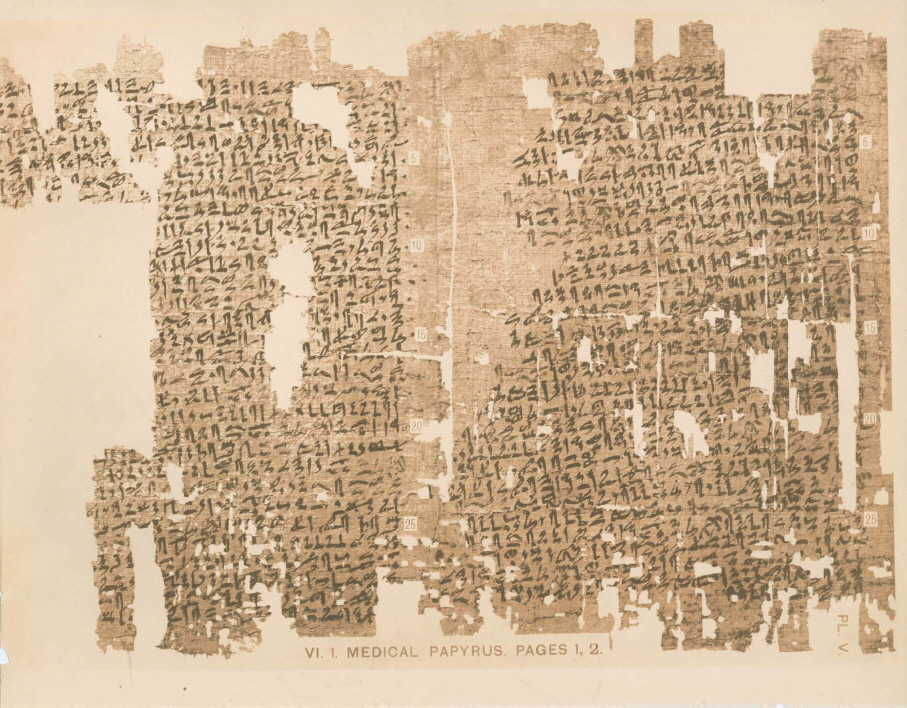
- Page 1 and part of page 2 of the Kahun Gynaecological Papyrus
- Created: c. 1825 BC
- Discovered: 1889; Egypt
- Discovered by: Flinders Petrie
- Present location: London, England, United Kingdom

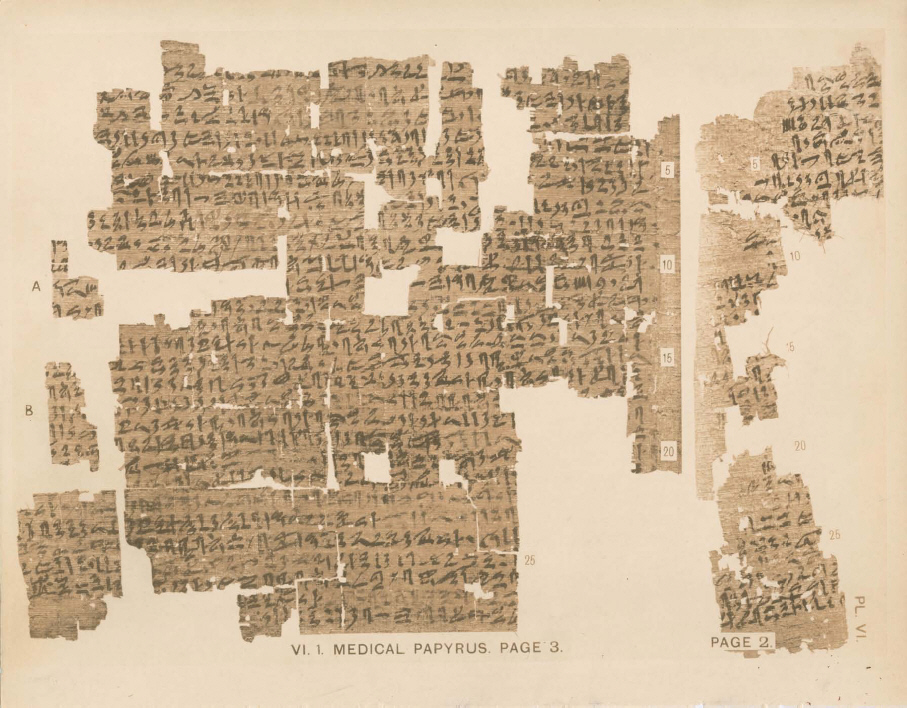
Part of page 2 and page 3 of the Kahun Gynaecological Papyrus

The Kahun Gynaecological Papyrus (also Petrie Medical Papyrus, Kahun Medical Papyrus, Lahun Medical Papyrus, or UC32057) is the oldest known medical text in Egyptian history, dated to c. 1825 BCE, during the Twelfth Dynasty. The Papyrus addresses gynecological health concerns, pregnancy, fertility, and various treatments.

== History ==
The Kahun Gynaecological Papyrus was found at El Lahun (Faiyum, Egypt) by Flinders Petrie in 1889, and first translated by F. Ll. Griffith in 1893 and published in The Petrie Papyri: Hieratic Papyri from Kahun and Gurob. It is kept in the Petrie Museum of Egyptian Archaeology of the University College London. The later Berlin Papyrus and the Ramesseum Papyrus IV cover much of the same ground, often giving identical prescriptions.

The text is divided into thirty-four sections, each section dealing with a specific problem and containing diagnosis and treatment; no prognosis is suggested. Treatments are non-surgical, comprising applying medicines to the affected body part or swallowing them. The womb is seen as the source of ailments manifesting themselves in other body parts, for which its fumigation is recommended, either by oils, incense or whatever the woman smells roasting – should it cause her to smell roasting.

== Contraception ==
In Column 3, Line 6 of the Papyrus, there are details of a contraception method involving the burning or sprinkling of crocodile dung. The Column 3, Line 6 contraception method is often misconstrued as insertion of crocodile dung against the cervix. The context of Column 3, Line 7 depicts another contraception method involving sprinkling honey and natron salt over the woman's womb to prevent pregnancy.

== See also ==
- List of ancient Egyptian papyri
- Kahun Papyri
- History of medicine

== Bibliography ==
- David, Rosalie; Forshaw, Roger (2023). Medicine and Healing Practices in Ancient Egypt. Liverpool University Press. ISBN 978-1-83553-629-2.
- O'Dowd, Michael J.; Philipp, Elliot E. (2000) [First published 1994]. The History of Obstetrics and Gynecology (Paperback ed.). New York: Parthenon Publishing Group. p. 43. ISBN 978-1-85070-040-1. LCCN 94019129.
- Smith, Lesley. "The Kahun Gynaecological Papyrus: Ancient Egyptian medicine." Journal of Family Planning and Reproductive Health Care (2011): 54-55.
