= Papyrus Golénischeff =

Ancient Egyptian papyrus

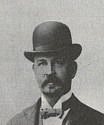
Wladimir Golenischeff

Papyrus Golénischeff is a papyrus artefact from ancient Egypt. It was found by Vladimir Semyonovich Golénischeff.

The artifact is the remains of what were four pages. On the first page, the first thirteen lines correspond to text missing from Berlin Papyrus No.1.

The text dates to the Fifteenth Dynasty of Egypt.

The text is onomastic, that is, it is either concerned with the history and origin of proper names or just simply concerns names. Amongst things of interest to modern scholarship, the text mentions the word nyw (waves), mentions the position of Zakkala at the beginning of the XXI^{st} (21st) dynasty, and together with Papyrus Hood the text makes reference to Ptah.

W.M. Mueller at some time studied the text.

== See also ==
- List of ancient Egyptian papyri
