= Djehuty (general) =

Ancient Egyptian general

- Military career
- Allegiance: Egypt
- Known for: Protagonist of The Taking of Joppa
- Years active: c. 1455 BC

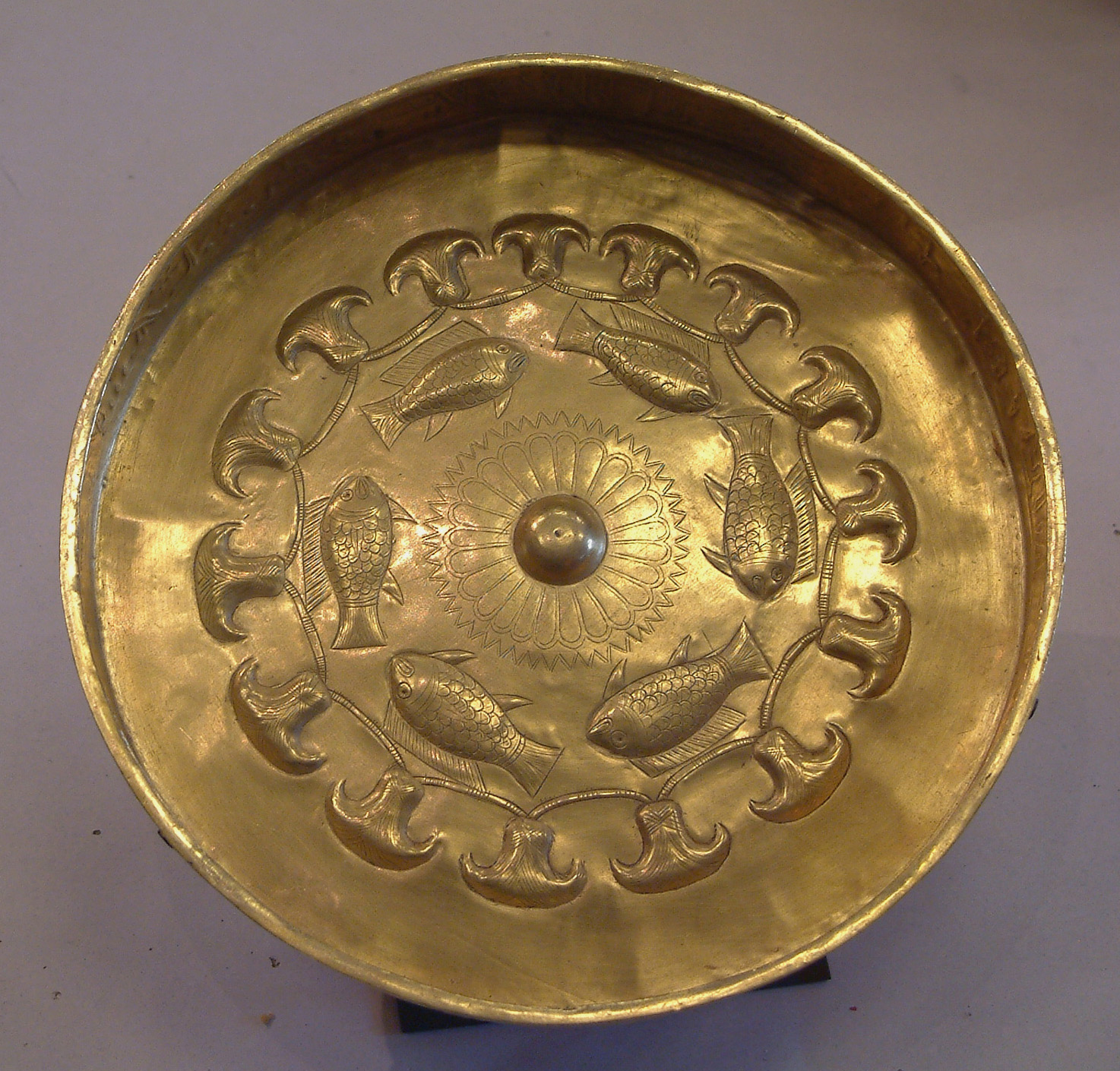
Golden bowl of Djehuty (Louvre)

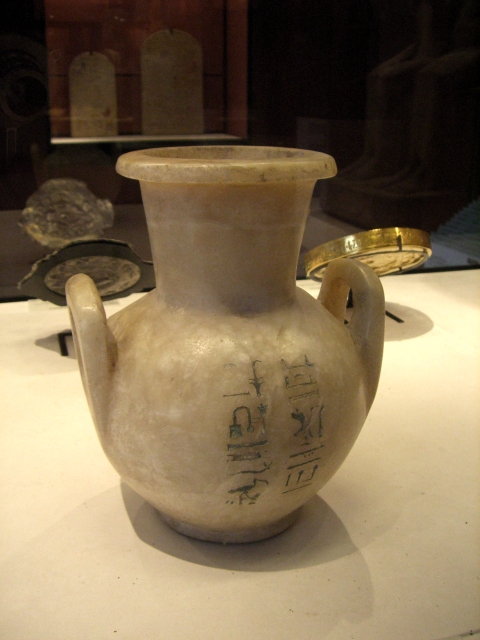
Alabaster vase of Djehuty

Djehuty (also known as Thuti and Thutii; fl. c. 1455 BC) was a general under the ancient Egyptian king Thutmose III in the 18th Dynasty. He is known as the main hero of the tale of "The Taking of Joppa". Djehuty bears the titles king's scribe, overseer of troops (general) and overseer of the northern foreign countries in contemporary Egyptian records.

== Biography ==
Djehuty is known from two sources. His undisturbed burial was found in 1824 at Saqqara and he is the main personality in the Egyptian story of "The Taking of Joppa" (today Jaffa).

The Egyptian narrative is preserved on a papyrus now located in the British Museum (EA 10060). The city of Joppa had rebelled against Thutmose III's authority and the pharaoh responded by dispatching an Egyptian army under Djehuty to regain control over the city. Djehuty first cunningly arranged to have a parley or talk with the rebel leader of Joppa at a location outside of the city walls. Once he was alone with the leader of the rebellion, Djehuty promptly smote the man on his forehead and captured him. With this task accomplished, Djehuty decided to take control of the city by subterfuge. Djehuty first falsely proclaimed that he, Djehuty, had been defeated by the rebels and was now sending a "tribute" to the inhabitants of Joppa. The tribute came in the form of two hundred baskets which were delivered to Joppa as a peace offering by Djehuty. Unbeknownst to Joppa's inhabitants, however, each of the baskets concealed one of the two hundred of Djehuty's own soldiers.

The governor of Joppa, fooled by Djehuty's ruse, had them taken into the city through its city gates. Soon after, Djehuty's soldiers rose out of their baskets and quickly captured the city and seized its citizens. The Egyptian description of the capture of Joppa is, hence, somewhat similar to the story of the Trojan Horse which hypothetically occurred some two centuries later at Troy. With Joppa now firmly back in Egyptian hands, Djehuty sent word to his king, Thutmose III, of his triumph:

Be of good cheer! For Amun, your good father, has given to you, the rebel of Joppa and all his people, as well as his city. Send men to take them away as captives that you may fill the house of your father Amun-Ra, King of the Gods, with male and female slaves, who have fallen beneath your feet forever.

== General Djehuty's historicity ==
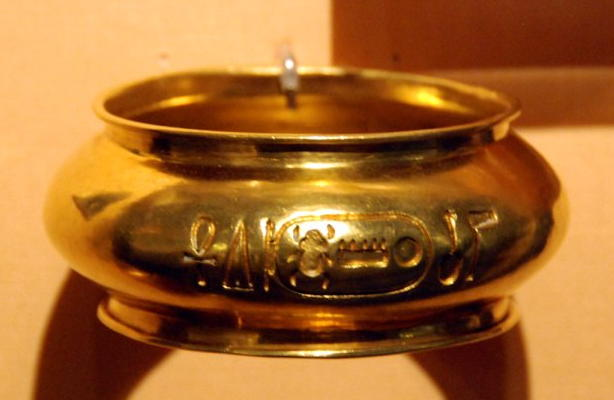
General Djehuty's gold bracelet (Leiden)

Djehuty was not a fictional person. In the winter of 1824, Bernardino Drovetti found his completely undisturbed tomb at Saqqara. In these early days, Egyptian archaeology was in its infancy and only a few notes of the excavations were ever made. Today, there are only brief descriptions of the discovery preserved in archaeological records. The objects were sold to different museum collections all around the world and, in most cases, can only be ascribed with certainty to Djehuty's tomb when they bear his name. The objects found in the general's tomb include a solid golden and a silver bowl, both today in the Louvre, four canopic jars now in Florence, the heart scarab, a gold bracelet in the Rijksmuseum of Leiden and Djehuty's dagger in Darmstadt. Nothing is known about Djehuty's coffin and mummy, although they were briefly mentioned by Drovetti.

It is also believed that the Ashburnham ring, which is "one of the most spectacular pieces of Egyptian jewellery to be added to the [British Museum's] national collection for many years" also originated from General Djehuty's burial. The ring was originally purchased by George Ashburnham in Cairo in 1825 likely from the proceeds of excavation work carried out by Drovetti in Saqqara and Djehuty's tomb was only discovered in the previous year. This rectangular swivel, bezel ring weighs 35.8 grams and is inscribed on both its sides with the texts: "He of the Two Ladies, Great of terror in all lands" and "Menkheperre, beloved of Ptah, radiant of face." Since Christine Lilyquist's study of Djehuty's gold bowl and other funerary objects showed that Djehuty was likely buried at Saqqara and not Thebes as originally assumed, it would appear that the Ashburnham ring came from Djehuty's tomb treasures.

Djehuty's golden bowl in the Louvre contains an inscription which records that it was a gift by Thutmose III to his general:

Granted by royal favor of Menkheperre [Thutmose III], King of Upper and Lower Egypt, to his excellency the noble, father of the god, beloved of the god, man of confidence of the king in all foreign lands and on the islands amid the sea, he who fills the stores with lapis lazuli, silver and gold, the general...[and] the royal scribe Djehuty, acquitted.

== Literature ==
- C. Lilyquist: The Gold Bowl Naming General Djehuty: A Study of Objects and Early Egyptology, In: Metropolitan Museum Journal, Vol. 23, 1988 (1988), pp.5-68
- N. Reeves: The Ashburnham ring and the burial of General Djehuty: In: Journal of Egyptian Archaeology 79 (1993), pp.259-261
