= Standing Figure of Nefertiti =

Sculpture of Queen Nefertiti

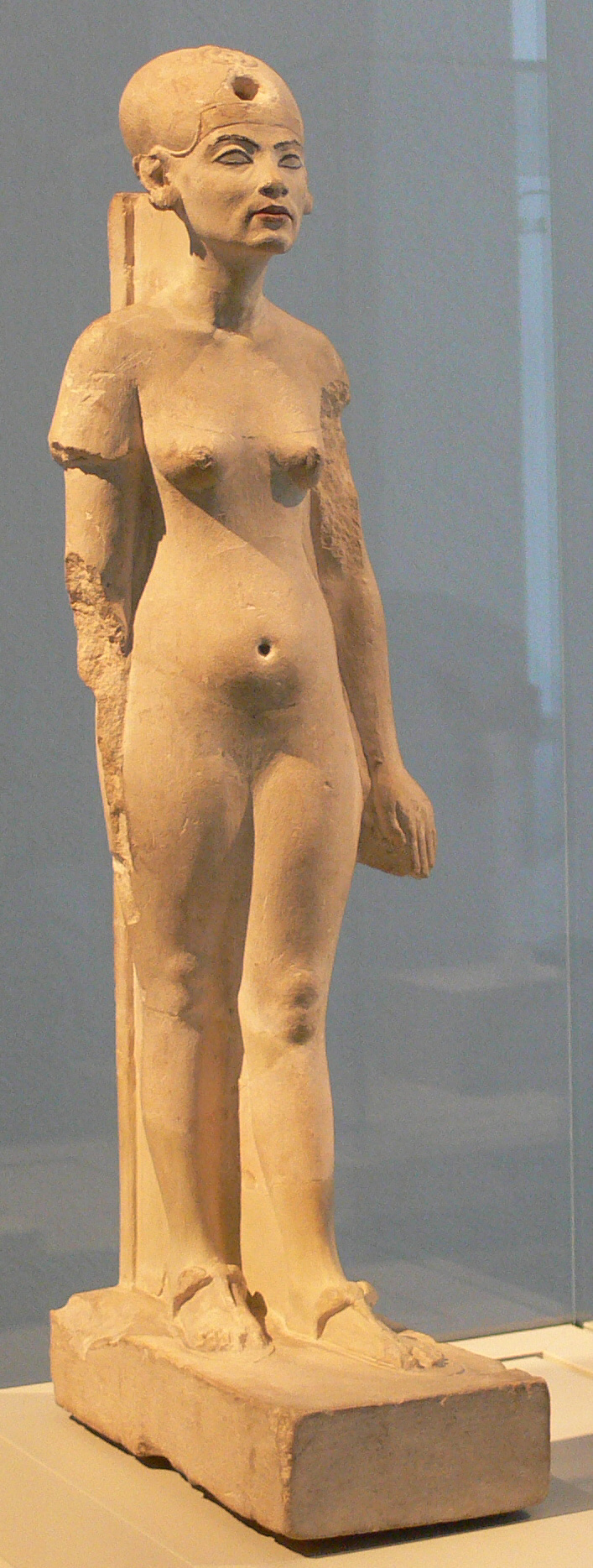
- Material: Limestone
- Height: 40 cm
- Created: c. 1350 BC
- Discovered: 1920; Minya, Egypt
- Present location: Egyptian Museum of Berlin, Berlin, Germany
- Identification: 21263

The Standing Figure of Nefertiti is a limestone sculpture of Queen Nefertiti created around 1350 BC. It is in the Egyptian Museum of Berlin. The queen's depiction is typical of the early Amarna Period. She is wearing sandals and a transparent robe. The figure was found in multiple pieces in 1920 during an excavation by the German Oriental Society in the remains of the studio of Thutmose. As a Great Royal Wife, Nefertiti has a special role in the history of Ancient Egypt. For this reason various representations of her have been preserved, although complete statues are rare.

== History ==
The statue was found in 1920 during an excavation by the German Oriental Society in house P47.2, the studio of Thutmose. It was acquired by James Simon, who then gave it to the Egyptian Museum. The figure was found broken into several pieces, and remains incomplete to this day. The complete right and parts of the upper left arm, the toes, and the nipples are missing. Markings on the statue indicate that it is not complete. It is believed that further work would have been done on the face to make it more realistic.

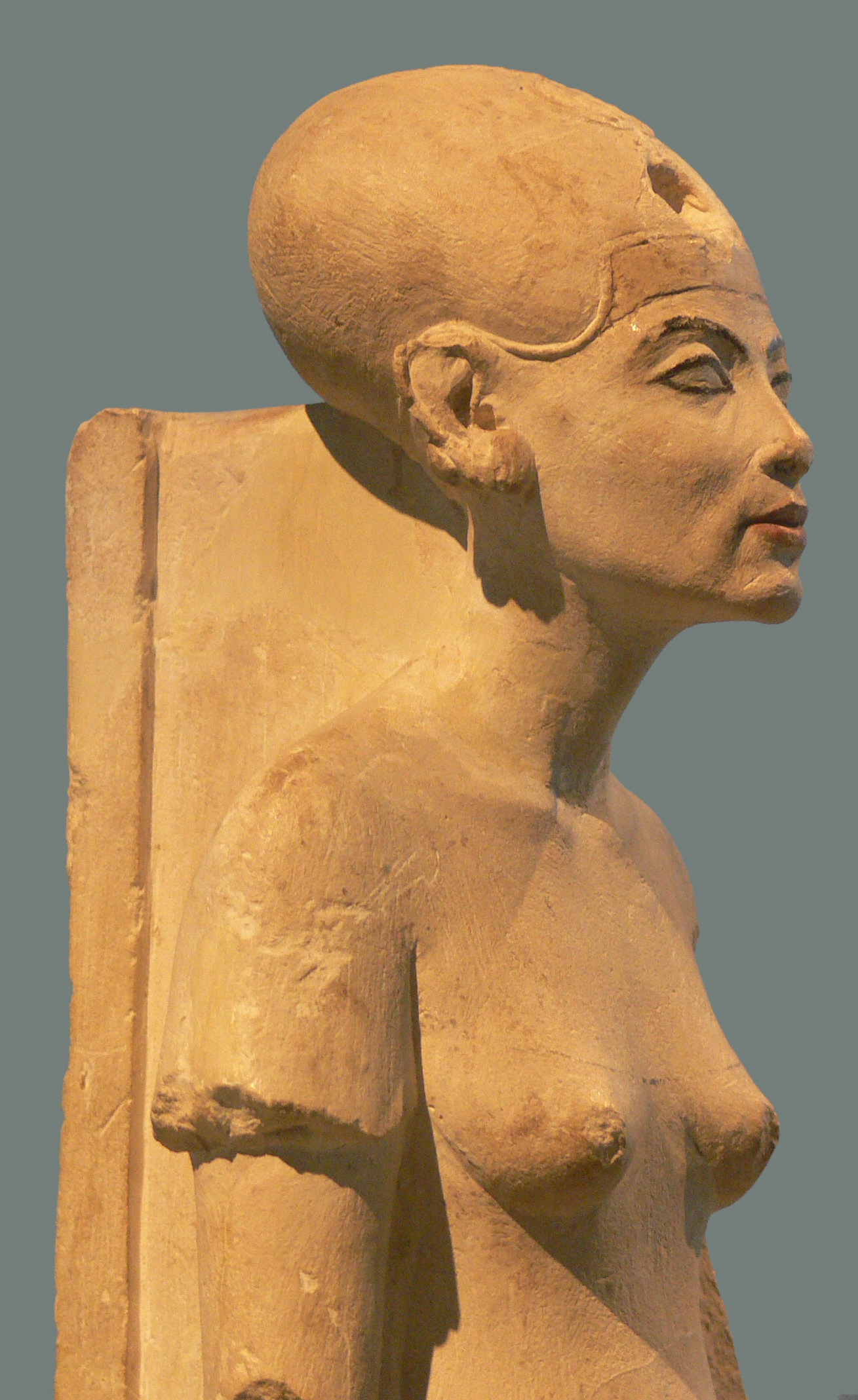
Side view of head

Nefertiti is depicted with a slightly protruding left leg. The back of the sculpture is connected with a floor-to-head back pillar. She is wearing sandals and a transparent robe, which can only be recognized by sleeves on the arms. This depiction is typical of the art of the Amarna period. The queen is depicted as an older woman after the birth of six children. This was done to create a more lifelike portrait of the queen, rather than conform with existing ideals of beauty in Egyptian art. As a result, the face, abdomen, butt, and breasts show traces of age, a novelty in Egyptian art.

The head of the queen is crowned by a tight fitting hood. Underneath is a headband which still contains yellow pigment. The mouth is red, and the eyelids and eyebrows are black. At the neck and above the chest are remnants of another black pattern which indicate a wide shoulder collar. Above the head, a hole is visible in which the front part of the royal uraeus was fastened.
