= Saite Oracle Papyrus =

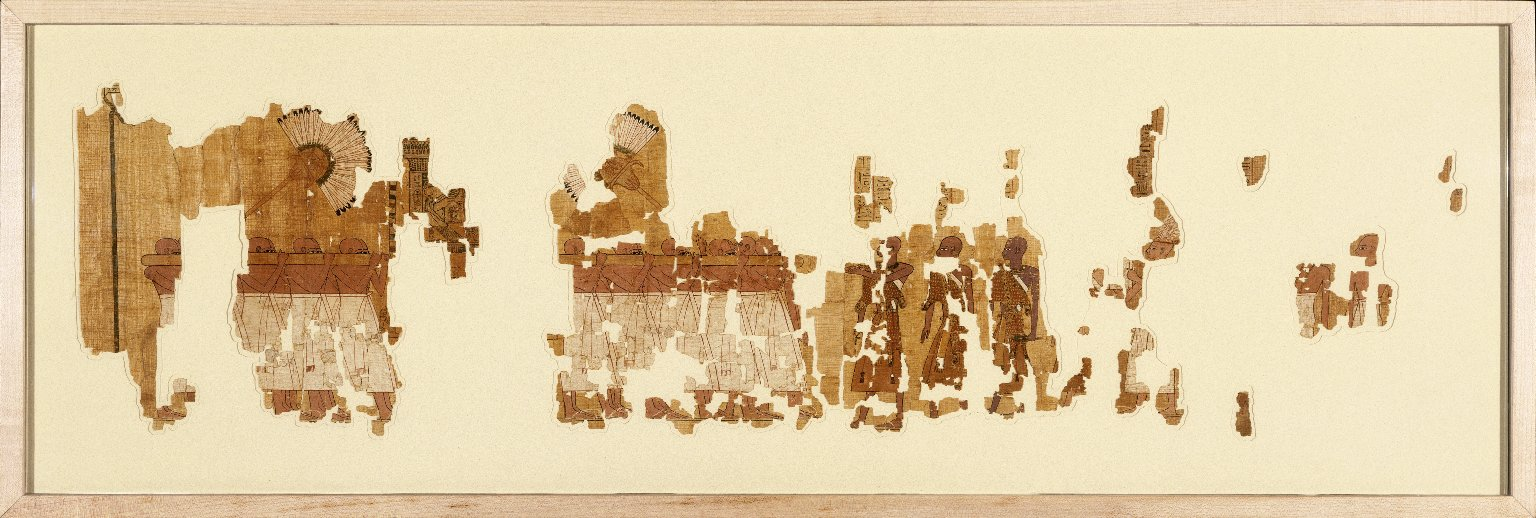
Saite Oracle Papyrus, October 4, 651 B.C.E., 47.218.3a-j, Brooklyn Museum

The Saite Oracle Papyrus is a papyrus from the Late Period of Egypt that shows a man petitioning for his father to be allowed to leave the priesthood of his temple in Karnak and join a different one.

The Brooklyn Oracle Papyrus records the petition of a man named Pemou on behalf of his father, Harsiese. Harsiese was an ordinary priest in the service of the god Amun-Re at Karnak, but he wished to leave that god's service and join the priesthood of the neighboring temple of Montu-Re-Horakhty. Because temple personnel were seen as the property of the divinity, the god had to be consulted about any change in staff. Pemou asked for the god's advice on behalf of his father, and the god responded favorably. To record the verdict, Pemou had this papyrus drawn up and decorated.

In the image, the precession of Amun-Re can be seen, with parts of his shrine visible above the carrying poles held by priests.

== See also ==
- List of ancient Egyptian papyri
