= Papyrus Harris 500 =

Egyptian manuscript, 1292–1077 BC

The Papyrus Harris 500, alt. pHarris 500 or P. British Museum 10060, contains copies of the ancient Egyptian tales of The Doomed Prince and The Taking of Joppa, of love poems and of the Harper's Song from the tomb of King Intef. The papyrus dates from the Ramesside Period (Dynasties 19 and 20, 1292–1077 BC).

== Description ==
The papyrus is 19.5 centimeters in height, and 142.5 centimeters long. Parts of the original papyrus are missing.

== Fate after discovery ==
The papyrus was part of the collection of Anthony Charles Harris (1790–1869) and was purchased after his death, in 1872 by the British Museum from Selima Harris, his natural daughter. It is located in the British Museum’s Ancient Egypt and Sudan department, with the registration number 1872,1101.2.

According to reports the papyrus had been intact when discovered, but was damaged in an explosion which wrecked the house in Alexandria where it was kept. The rumour that a copy of the complete document had been made by Harris before the explosion has never been verified.

== See also ==
- List of ancient Egyptian papyri
- Papyrus Harris I
