= Papyrus Lansing =

Ancient Egyptian document

The Papyrus Lansing (BM EA 9994) is an Egyptian document dated to the 20th Dynasty. It is written in the words of one Nebmare-nakht, royal scribe and chief overseer of the cattle of Amun and directed to his pupil, Wenemdiamun, advocating the benefits of becoming a scribe while simultaneously disparaging other occupations such as farming and soldiering for the physical labor and danger involved. The text was used as practice for new scribes.

The papyrus was found in Thebes and acquired by the British Museum in 1886.

== Content ==
Note: the section headers below follow those in Caminos (the original papyrus does not contain section headers / sub-titles):

=== Praise of the Scribe's Profession ===
The first section introduces the author as Nebmare-nakht, royal scribe and chief overseer of Amun-ra's sacred cattle. He then claims that becoming a scribe will lead to great advancement, and Wenemdiamun should shun all else in the pursuit of becoming a scribe. Finally, he claims that writing pleases "more than bread and beer".

=== The Scribe's Advice to an Unwilling Pupil ===
The second section begins by chastising Wenemdiamun for his slowness to obey and mourning that no amount of whipping can seem to fix his laziness. Nebmare-nakht says that Wenemdiamun would make in excellent scribe if he put himself to his work. Then he again declares how enjoyable writing is, this time comparing it to the joy of a mother with her newborn.

=== The Idle Scribe is like a Useless Animal ===
Nebma-re-nakht compares his pupil to wild animals, the nile-goose or the bubalis.

=== All Callings Are Bad Except That of the Scribe ===
Nebmare-nakht begins by explaining that the occupation of the launderer is inferior because they have to burden their arms with carrying around heavy laundry and scrubbing clothing. The potter is inferior because they end up covered in clay, the cobbler "mingles with vats. His odor is penetrating. His hands are red with madder, like one who is smeared with blood." The watchman's job is inferior because they have to stay up all night. The merchants have to travel upstream and downstream all the time and are busy. Sailors don't expect to see Egypt again when they leave. If carpenters don't sell their wood, the shipwright will get after them, and the man who cuts the timber gets it worst of all because he has to stay out working all day.

=== The Misfortunes of the Peasant ===
When it rains, the peasant is soaked. He farms all day and makes rope all night. If he leaves out his team of horses, they get eaten by jackals and he has to beg for money to get another one. When he finally has the money to proceed, his field needs to be plowed again and he has to use borrowed grain. Even then, there are snakes, and sometimes the crop doesn't grow. Nubians can steal grain, and if there's none to give, the farmer is beaten, tied, and thrown in a well. Then his wife and children are made into slaves, and there's still no grain.

=== Advice to Choose the Scribe's Profession ===
Multiple exhortations to forego an idle lifestyle of dancing and drinking and to become a scribe, highlighting the benefits of this position.

=== The Scribe is Free and Rich, not Miserable like the Soldier ===
Nebmare-nakht advises Wenemdiamun to make himself a trusted scribe because he can gain wealth and prestige if he does. Nebmare-nakht then states that a soldier is the lowest of the low in rank, has to wake at all hours, toils like a slave, and is hungry. He has no clothes and little water, and is taken quickly by disease or arrows. If he lives, he will be worn out from marching. The scribe has to worry about none of this.

=== The Pupil Declares his Intention to Build a Castle for the Teacher ===
The papyrus shifts now to a letter addressed by the pupil to his teachers.

=== The Castle which Ra-ia has Built for himself / additional texts ===
A description of a mansion by one Ra'ia and a hymn and a model letter follow.

== See also ==
- List of ancient Egyptian papyri

== Bibliography ==
- Blackman, Aylward M.; Peet, T. Eric (1925). "Papyrus Lansing: A Translation with Notes". The Journal of Egyptian Archaeology. 11 (3/4): 284–298. doi:10.2307/3854153. ISSN 0307-5133. JSTOR 3854153.
- Lichtheim, Miriam (1973). Ancient Egyptian Literature: The new kingdom. University of California Press. ISBN 978-0-520-03615-4.
