= Statue of Amenemhat III (Berlin) =

Ancient Egyptian statue

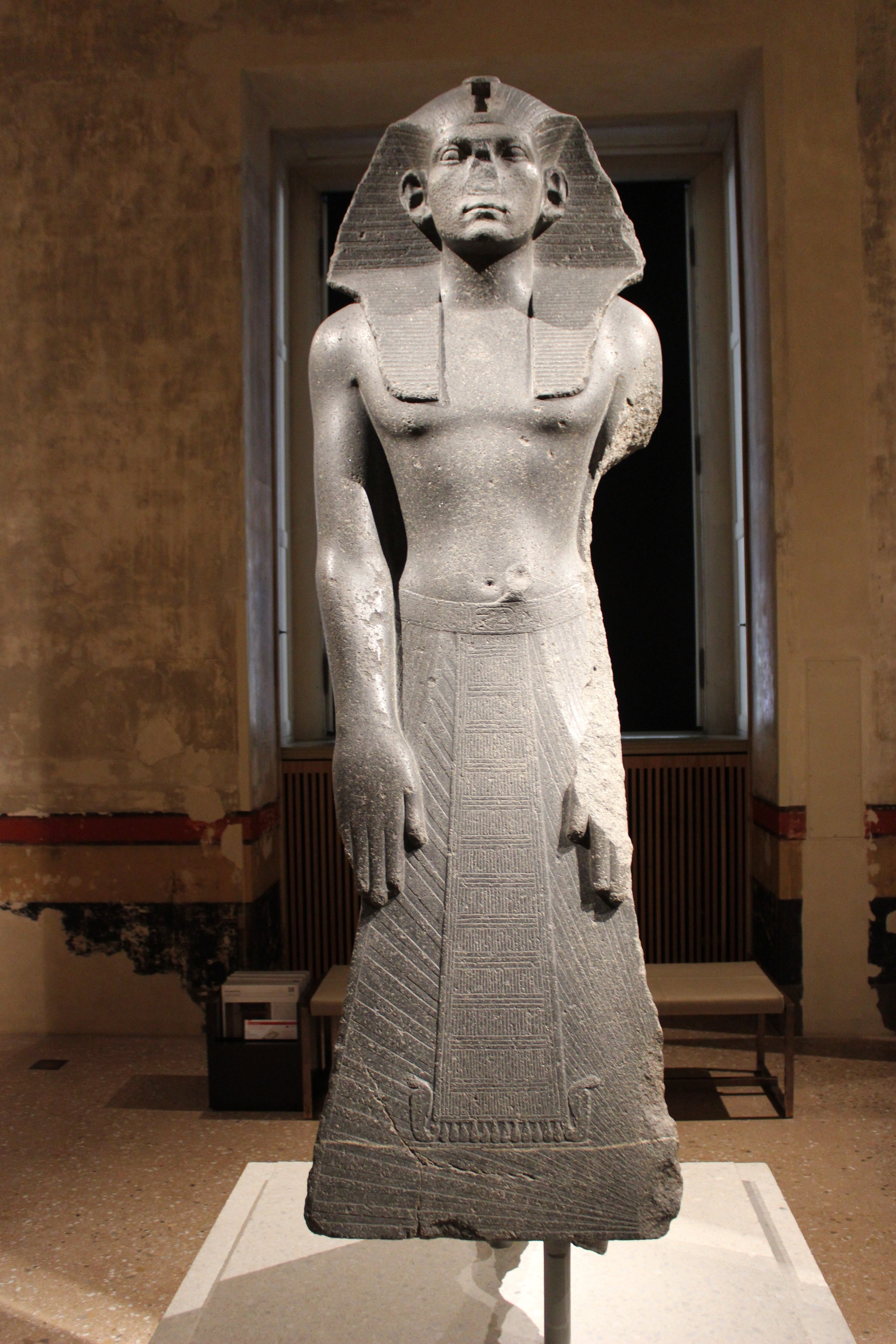
- Material: Granodiorite
- Height: 2 meters
- Created: c. 1830 BC
- Discovered: 1854; Giza, Egypt
- Discovered by: Joseph Hekekyan
- Present location: Egyptian Museum of Berlin, Berlin, Germany

The Statue of Amenemhat III in the Egyptian Museum in Berlin (inv. no. 1121) was found in 1854 by Joseph Hekekyan (1807–1875) at Memphis in Egypt. It was bought by the Egyptian Museum in 1855. The statue is one of the highlights of the Egyptian Museum in Berlin and one of the most important sculptures of Ancient Egypt in general.

The statue is made of granodiorite and is 2 meters high. It shows the Egyptian king Amenemhat III in a position of praying. He wears a nemes head dress and a long garment. The throne name of the king is still preserved on the belt. In the Egyptian 19th Dynasty, the statue was reinscribed by king Merneptah. His names and titles are on the back pillar. It seems that in ancient times, under Merenptah the face was reworked too and once covered with plaster and then painted.

The face shows an ageless king. There are two types of statues representing the king. Many statues showing a mature face with clear signs of age, while others show an ageless man. The Berlin statue clearly belongs to the latter type.
