= Ramesseum medical papyri =

The Ramesseum medical papyri constitute a collection of ancient Egyptian medical documents dating back to the early 18th century BC, found in the temple of the Ramesseum. As with most ancient Egyptian medical papyri, these documents mainly dealt with ailments, diseases, the structure of the body, and proposed remedies used to heal these afflictions, namely ophthalmologic ailments, gynaecology, muscles, tendons, and diseases of children. It is the only well-known papyrus to describe these in great detail. Most of the text written in the known manuscripts of this collection are in parts III, IV, and V, and written in vertical columns.

Papyrus IV deals with issues similar to the Kahun Gynecological Papyrus, such as labor, the protection of the newborn, ways to predict the likelihood of its survival, and ways to predict which sex the newborn will be. It also contains a contraception formula.

Papyrus V contains numerous prescriptions dealing with the relaxation of limbs, written in hieroglyphic script, rather than hieratic script as other medical papyri were.

== See also ==
- Ramesseum Magician’s Box
- List of ancient Egyptian papyri
