= Harper's Songs =

Ancient Egyptian texts

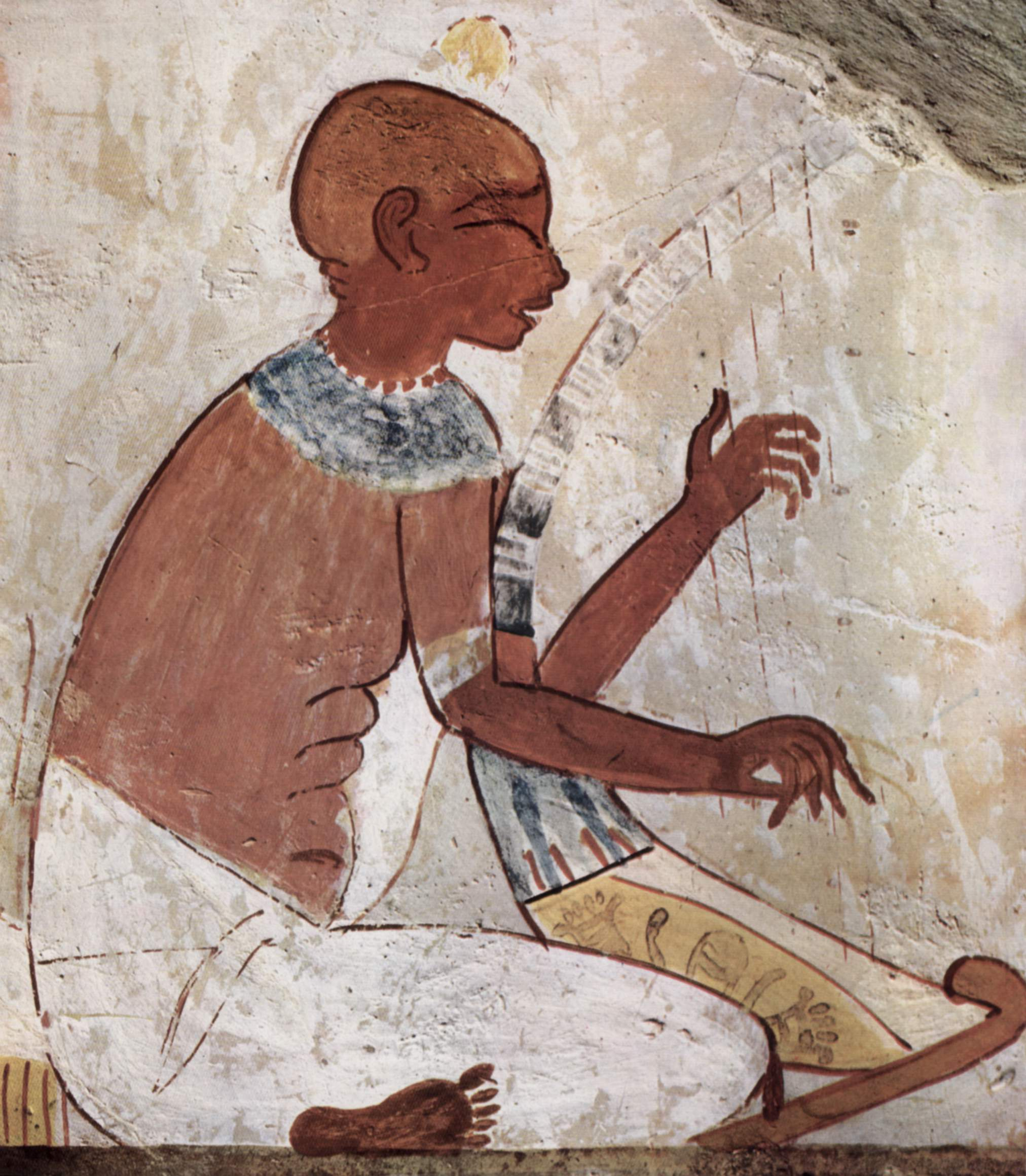
During the Middle Kingdom (c. 2040–1640 BCE) blind harpists are depicted on tomb walls. The ancient Egyptians were not exclusively interested in the causes and cures for blindness but also the social care of the individual.

Harper's Songs are ancient Egyptian texts that originated in tomb inscriptions of the Middle Kingdom (but found on papyrus texts until the Papyrus Harris 500 of the New Kingdom), which in the main praise life after death and were often used in funerary contexts. These songs display varying degrees of hope in an afterlife that range from the skeptical through to the more traditional expressions of confidence. These texts are accompanied by drawings of blind harpists and are therefore thought to have been sung. Thematically they have been compared with The Immortality of Writers in their expression of rational skepticism.

== Background ==
The distinction between songs, hymns and poetry in ancient Egyptian texts is not always clear. The convention is to treat as songs those poetic texts which are depicted with musical instruments. If the songs are seen to have a clear connection with temple cults and festivals then they are commonly described as hymns. Poetic texts which are shown with scenes of labor are compared with songs sung by Egyptian laborers in the modern era and are also therefore classified as songs. Other songs relate to the cult of the dead and are nearly always depicted with harps from which the title "Harper's Songs" is derived. Since the songs are reflections on death, rather than being part of the rituals associated with burial, freer expression of thoughts is encountered in these texts. Songs sought to reassure the owner of the tomb about his fate after death by way of praise. The greater freedom, in the case Harper's Song from the Tomb of King Intef, even went so far as to doubt the reality of an afterlife, lamenting death and advising that life should be enjoyed whilst it could. Miriam Lichtheim viewed this as introducing a more skeptical strand of thought which would be reflected in works such as the Dispute between a Man and His Ba and other Harper's Songs.

== Middle Kingdom ==
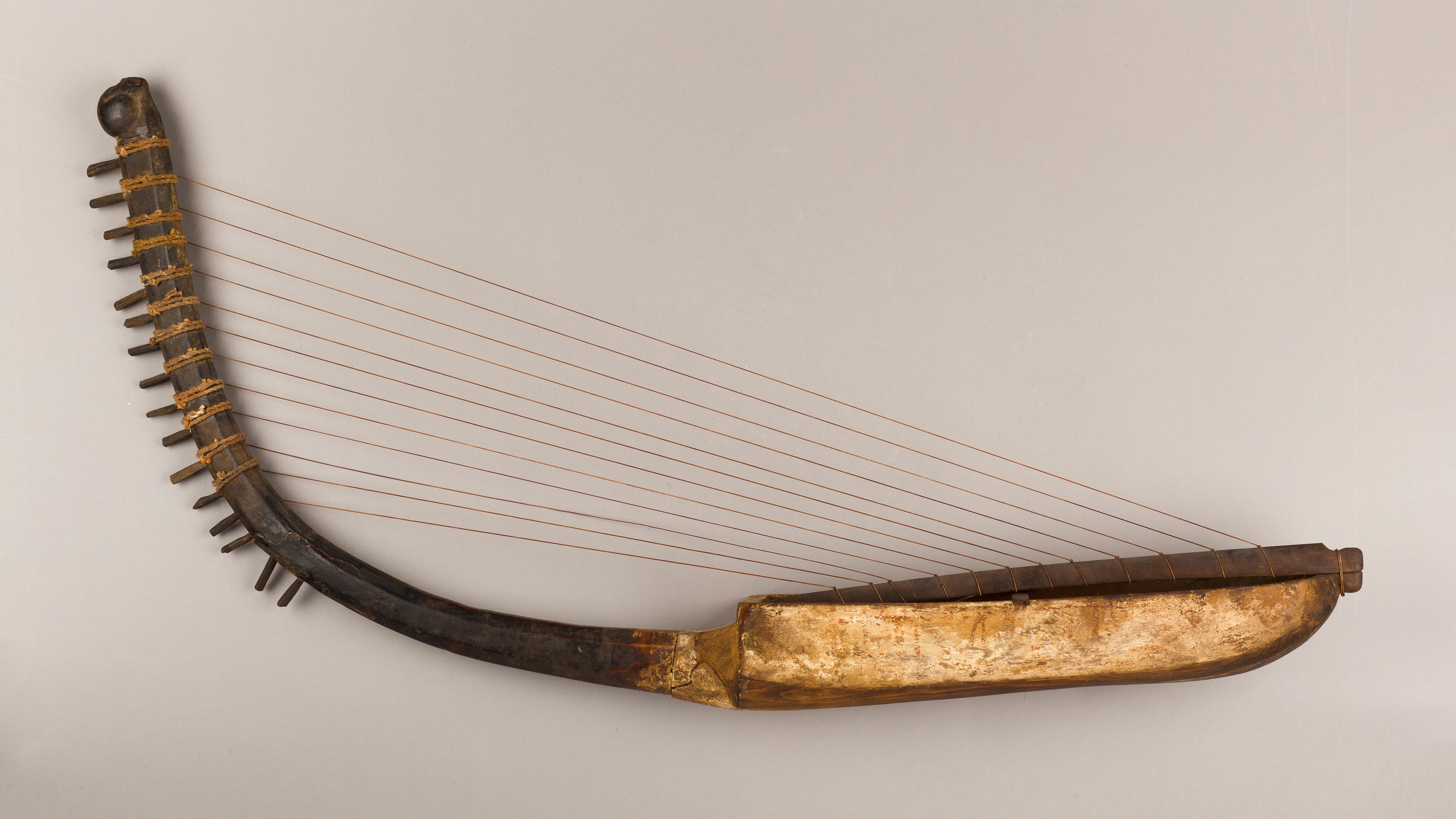
Egyptian harp, c. 1390–1295 BC

The short song from the funerary stela of Iki is depicted with the deceased sitting at an offering table with his wife and the rotund harpist Neferhotep sitting in front of them:

O tomb, you were built for festivity,
You were founded for happiness!

The singer Neferhotep, born of Henu.

The stela of Nebankh from Abydos contains a Harper's Song with the deceased shown seated at the offering table with the harpist squatting in front of him:

The singer Tjeniaa says:
How firm you are in your seat of eternity,
Your monument of everlastingness!
It is filled with offerings of food,
It contains every good thing.
Your ka is with you,
It does not leave you,
O Royal Seal-Bearer, Great Steward, Nebankha!
Yours is the sweet breath of the northwind!
So says his singer who keeps his name alive,
The honorable singer Tjeniaa, whom he loved,
Who sings to his ka every day.

A song from the tomb of Paatenemheb, which dates from the reign of Akhenaten, is described in its introductory line as having been copied from the tomb of a King Intef, (a name used by several kings from 11th and 17th dynasties) It is also preserved in the Ramesside New Kingdom Harris 500 papyrus. These works are accepted by scholars as being a copy of a genuine Middle Kingdom text. The song suggests a person should enjoy the good things in life, avoid contemplation of death and expresses doubt about the reality of an afterlife.

Make holiday, don't weary of it!!
Look, there is no one allowed to take their things with them,
and there is no one who goes away comes back again.

Comparison have been made between the sentiments expressed in the above text with a description by Herodotus from a much later period of how a banquet for the rich in Egypt would culminate with a wooden effigy of the deceased being passed around with the saying "Look upon this!" and "drink and rejoice, for thou shalt be as this."

Harpers Songs from the New Kingdom period respond to the rational skepticism displayed in this song by way of outright rejection of impiety or by moderating the skepticism.

== New Kingdom ==
In the case of the priest Neferhotep the three Harper's songs found in his tomb display a full range of viewpoints. In one the sceptical position is blended with the more conventional expressions of hope, the second rejects skepticism, whilst the third is a ritualistic affirmation in life after death.

I have heard those songs that are in the ancient tombs,
And what they tell
Extolling life on earth and belittling the region of the dead.
Wherefore do they thus, concerning the land of eternity,
The just and the fair,
Which has no terrors?

Wrangling is its abhorrence; no man there girds himself against his fellow.
It is a land against which none can rebel.
All our kinsfolk rest within it, since the earliest day of time;
The offspring of millions are come hither, every one.
For none may tarry in the land of Egypt,
None there is who has not passed yonder.

The span of earthly things is as a dream;

But a fair welcome is given him who has reached the West.

== Bibliography ==
- "Ancient Egyptian Literature Volume 1: The Old and Middle Kingdom", Miriam Lichtheim, University of California, 1975, ISBN 0-520-02899-6
- "Ancient Egyptian Literature Volume 2: The New Kingdom", Miriam Lichtheim, University of California, 1976, ISBN 0-520-03615-8

== Notes ==
Harper's song sung in Spanish by Macarena Fajardo Vicente-Ortega
