= Papyrus Hood =

Hieratic papyrus

Papyrus Hood is a hieratic papyrus from the time of 21st Dynasty Pharaoh Amenemope, 993–984 BC. The papyrus is at the British Museum, (no. BM EA 10202), and is a cursive hieratic manuscript which contains a copy of the Onomasticon of Amenope. This Third Intermediate Period work is known from eight other fragmentary copies, and relates back to the late New Kingdom era.

It is notable that the papyrus is an onomasticon, but it also lists words that are not known from any other sources, yet their meanings are known (i.e. 'snow').

== See also ==
- List of ancient Egyptian papyri
- Amenemope
- Onomastics
- Prosopography
