= Egyptian Museum of Berlin =

Collection of ancient Egyptian artefacts

Coordinates: 52°31′13″N 13°23′52″E

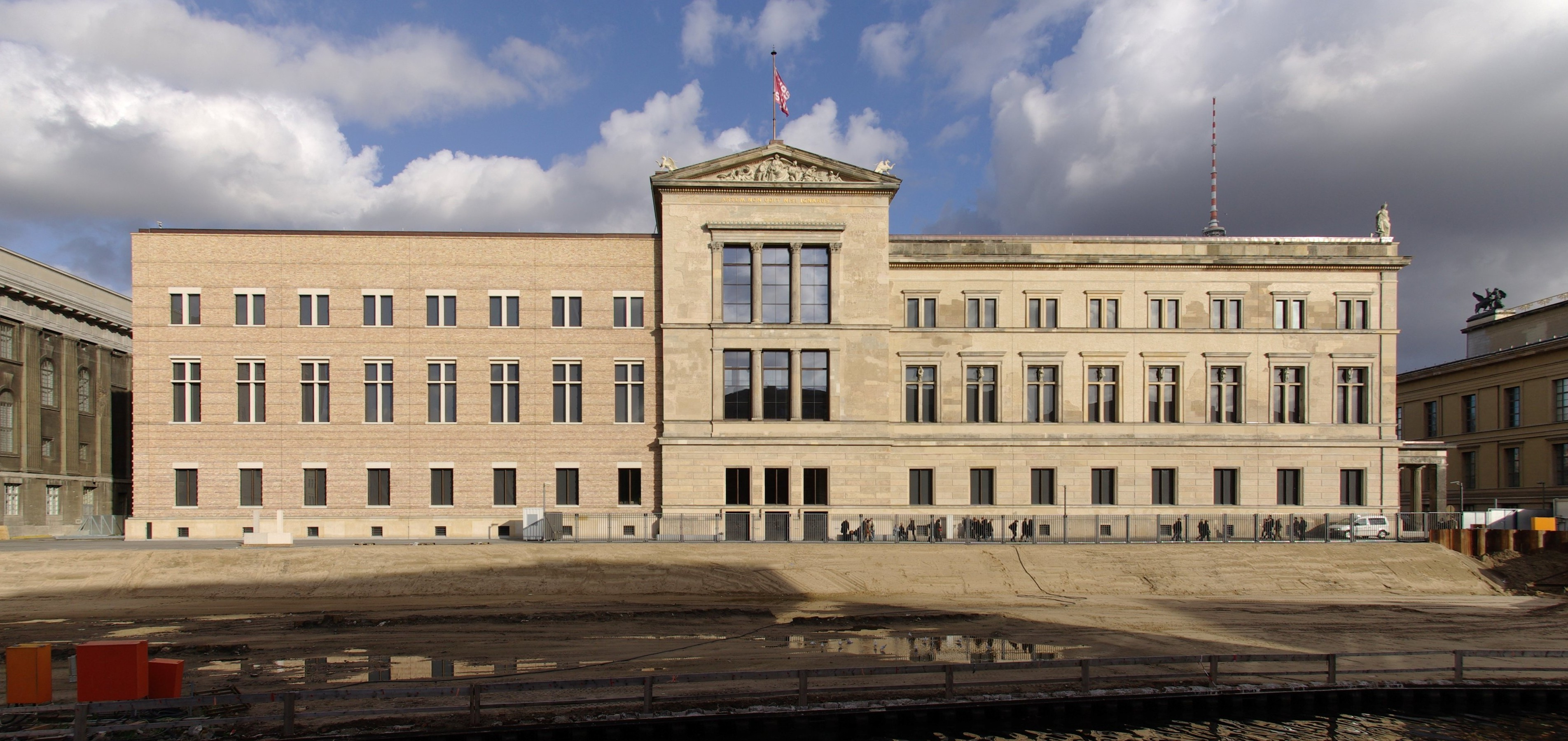
- Location: Museum Island, Berlin
- Website: www.smb.museum/museen-einrichtungen/aegyptisches-museum-und-papyrussammlung/

The Egyptian Museum and Papyrus Collection of Berlin (German: Ägyptisches Museum und Papyrussammlung) is home to one of the world's most important collections of ancient Egyptian artefacts, including the Nefertiti Bust. Since 1855, the collection is a part of the Neues Museum on Berlin's Museum Island, which reopened after renovations in 2009.

== History ==
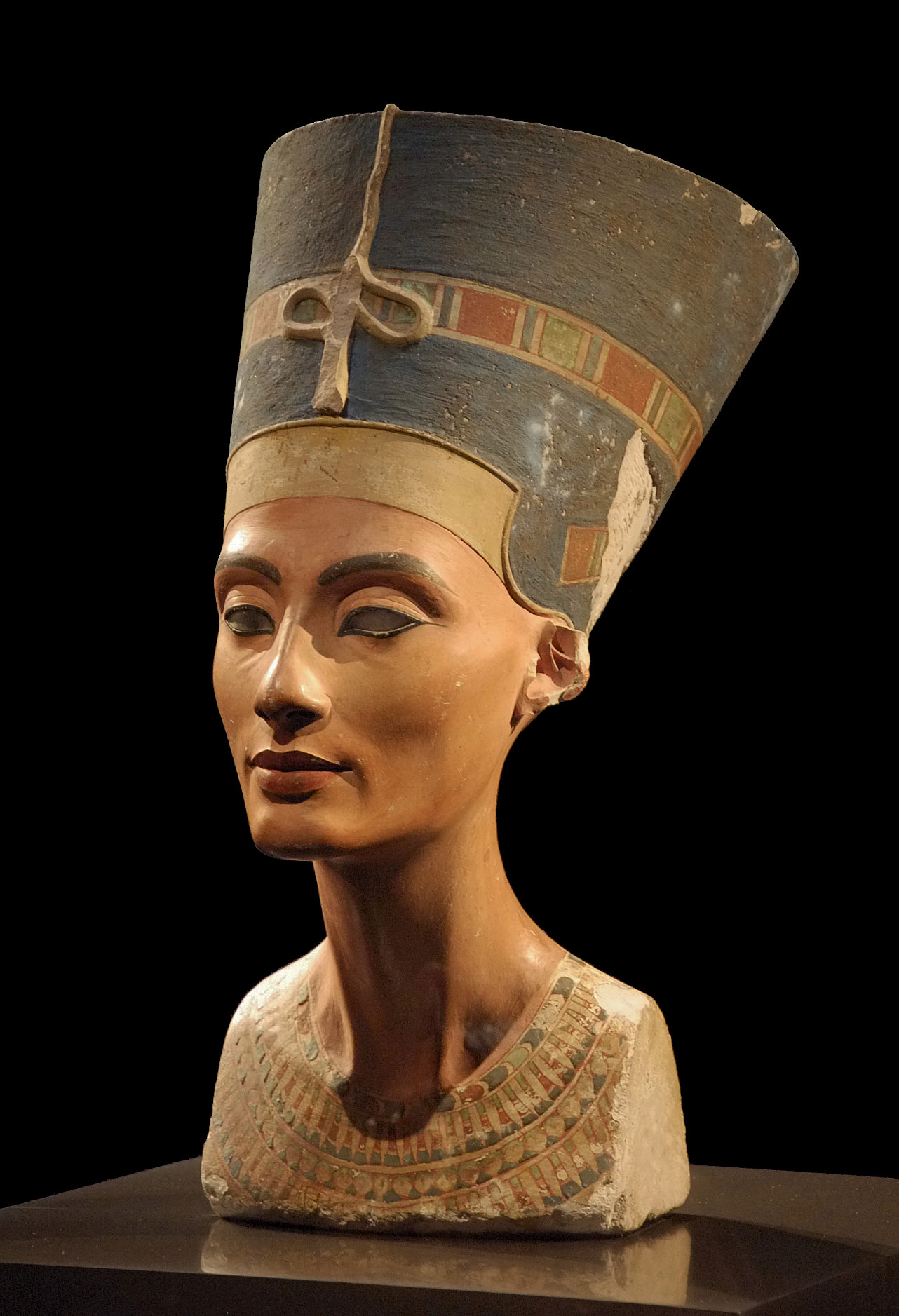
Nefertiti Bust

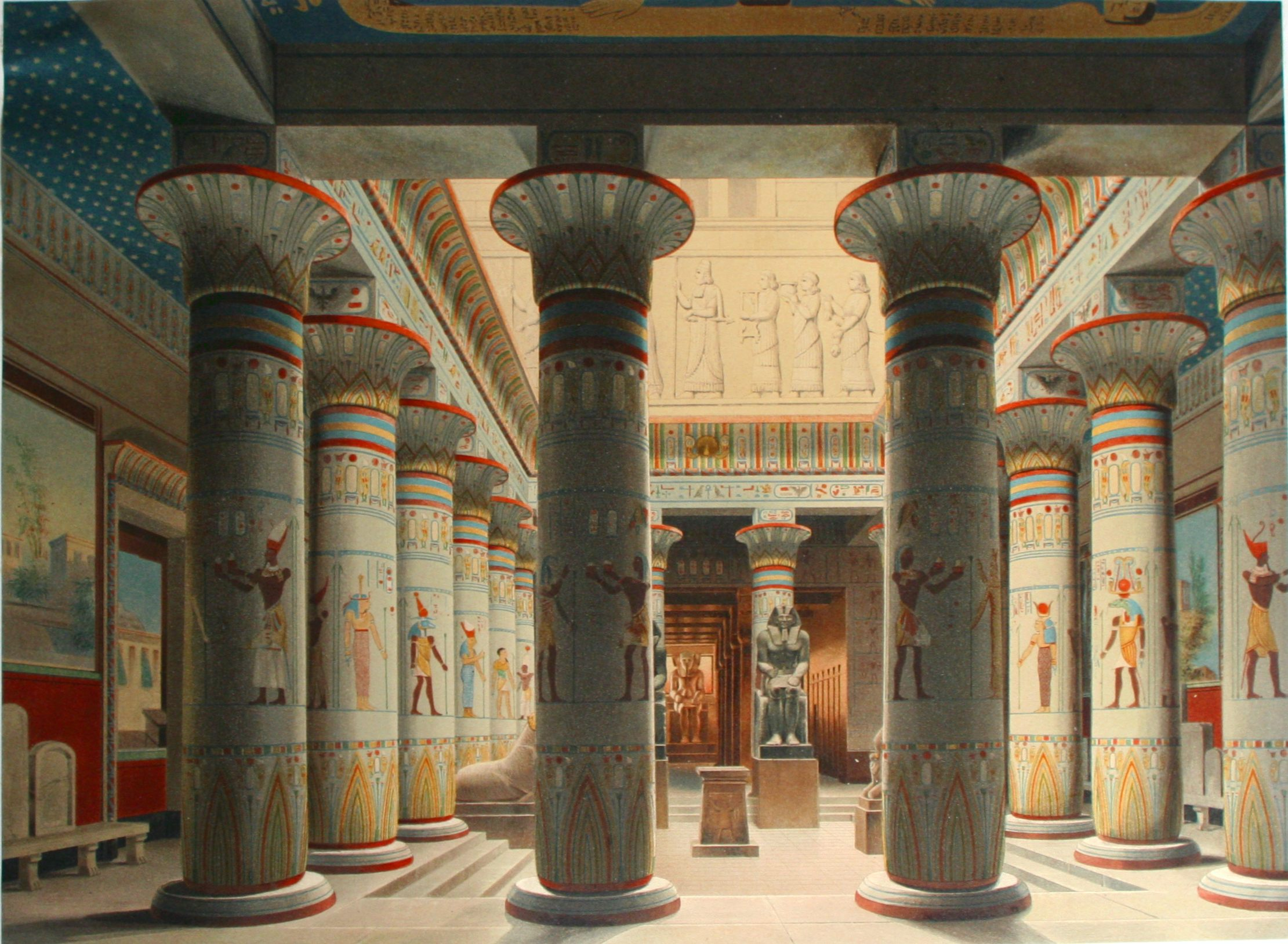
Egyptian courtyard at the Neues Museum, lithograph by Eduard Gaertner (1862)

The museum originated in the 18th century from the royal art collection of the Hohenzollern kings of Prussia. Alexander von Humboldt had recommended that an Egyptian section be created, and the first objects were brought to Berlin in 1828 under King Friedrich Wilhelm III. Initially housed in Monbijou Palace, the department was headed by the Trieste merchant Giuseppe Passalacqua (1797–1865), whose extensive collections formed the basis. A Prussian expedition to Egypt and Nubia led by Karl Richard Lepsius in 1842–45 brought additional pieces to Berlin.

In 1850, the collections moved to its present-day home in the Neues Museum, built according to plans designed by Friedrich August Stüler. The Nefertiti Bust, discovered during the excavations by Ludwig Borchardt in Amarna, was donated to the museum by the entrepreneur Henri James Simon in 1920; it quickly became its best-known exhibit. After World War II, during which the Neues Museum was heavily damaged by strategic bombing, the collections were divided between East and West Berlin. The main part remained in East Berlin and was displayed at the Bode Museum, while those artifacts evacuated to West Germany, including the Nefertiti Bust, returned to West Berlin. From 1967 to 2005, these items were housed vis-à-vis Charlottenburg Palace. The whole collection was reunited again after the Reunification of Germany, when it returned to Museum Island.

== Collection ==
The collection contains artefacts dating from between 4000 BC (the Predynastic era) to the period of Roman rule, though most date from the rule of Akhenaten (around 1340BC).

The most famous piece on display is the exceptionally well preserved and vividly coloured bust of Queen Nefertiti. The collection was moved from Charlottenburg to the Altes Museum in 2005 and was rehoused within the newly reconstructed Neues Museum on Berlin's Museum Island in October 2009.

The museum is home to at least 23 mummified ancient Egyptians. In the 2020s CT scans were performed on the mummies as part of a study into the mummification of hearts. At the same time the CT scans were examined to try and establish the mummified individuals' sex and the age at which they died.

Part of the collection are also three decorated cult chapels of Old Kingdom mastaba (Metjen, Manefer and Merib).

== Gallery ==
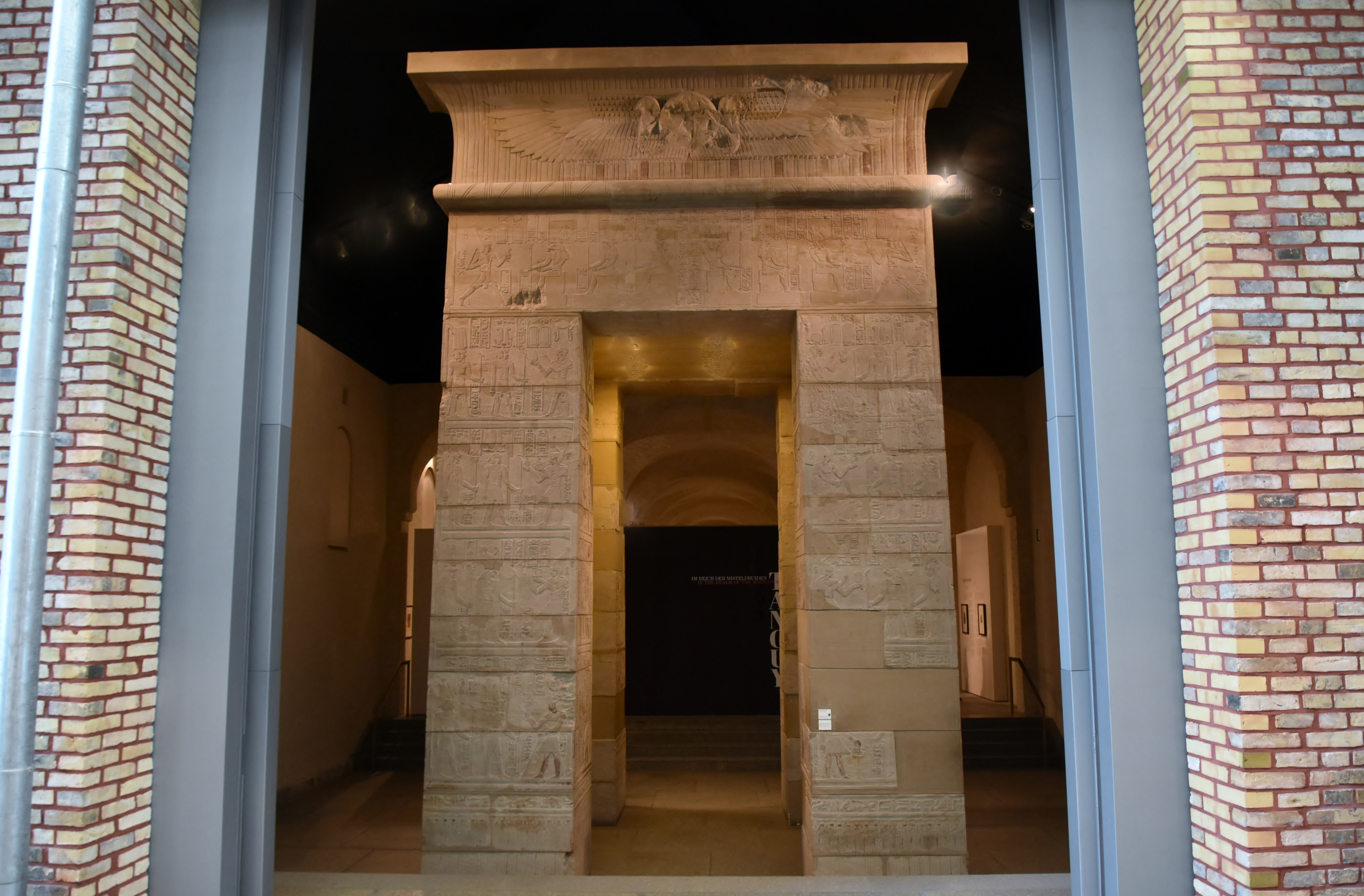
Kalabsha Gate, from the Temple of Kalabsha, donated as part of the International Campaign to Save the Monuments of Nubia

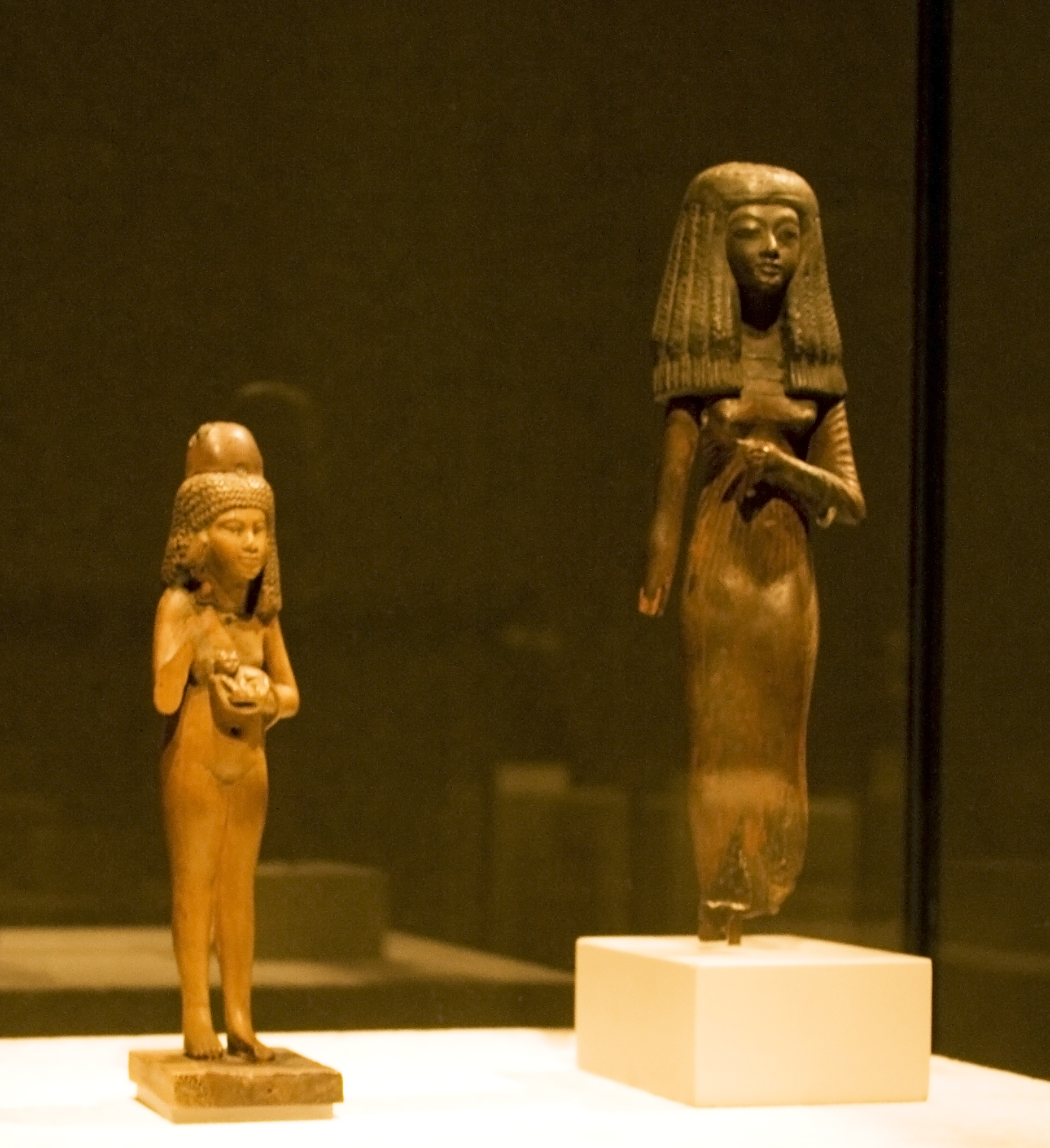
Figure of a girl with a cat and standing figure of a young woman, 18th Dynasty, c. 1380 and 19. Dynasty, Abusir el Meleq and Thebes

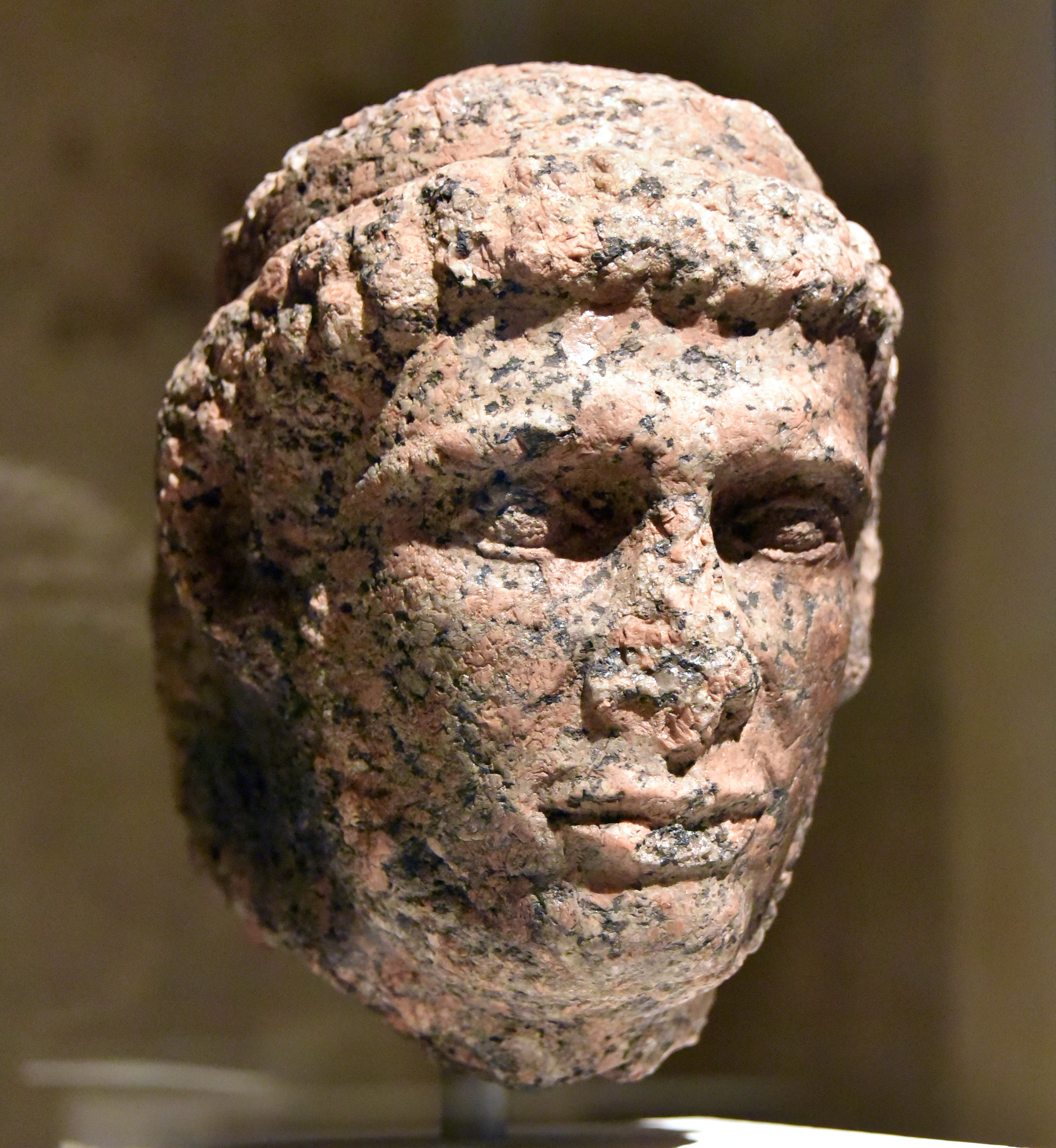
Head of a statue of king Ptolemaios X (reign 110–88 BC)

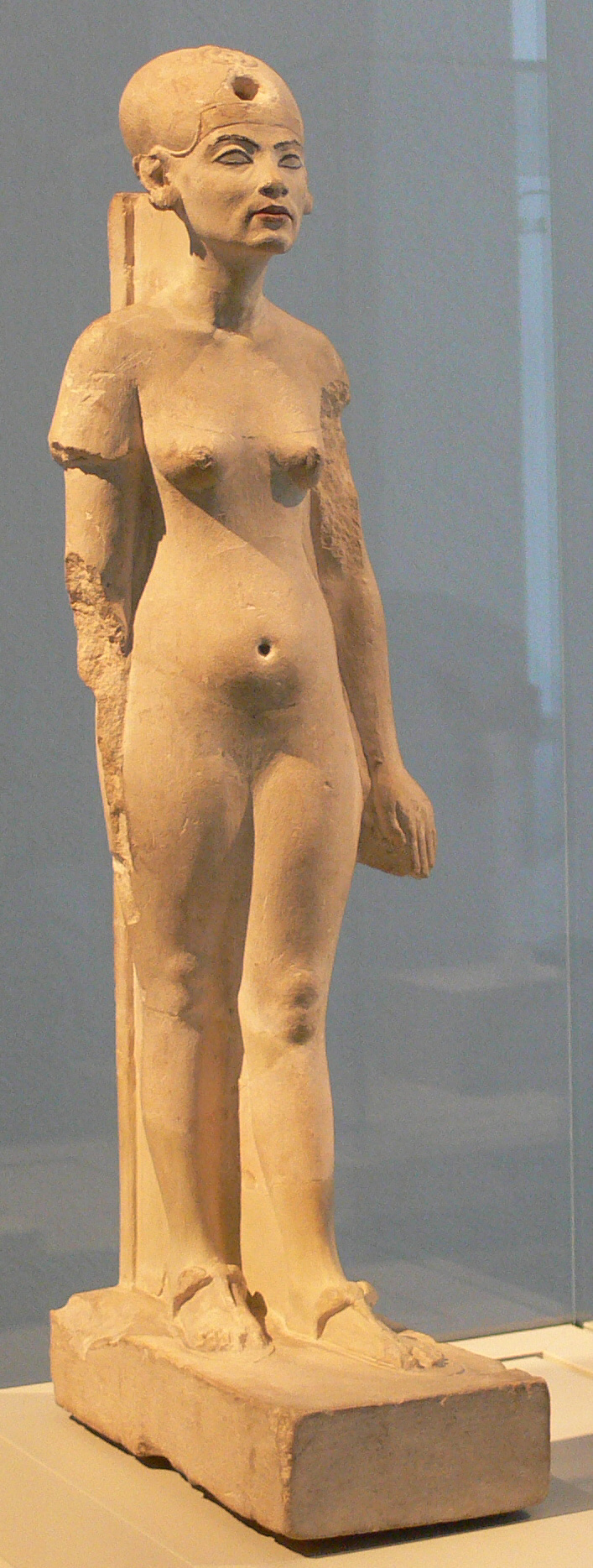
Standing Figure of Nefertiti

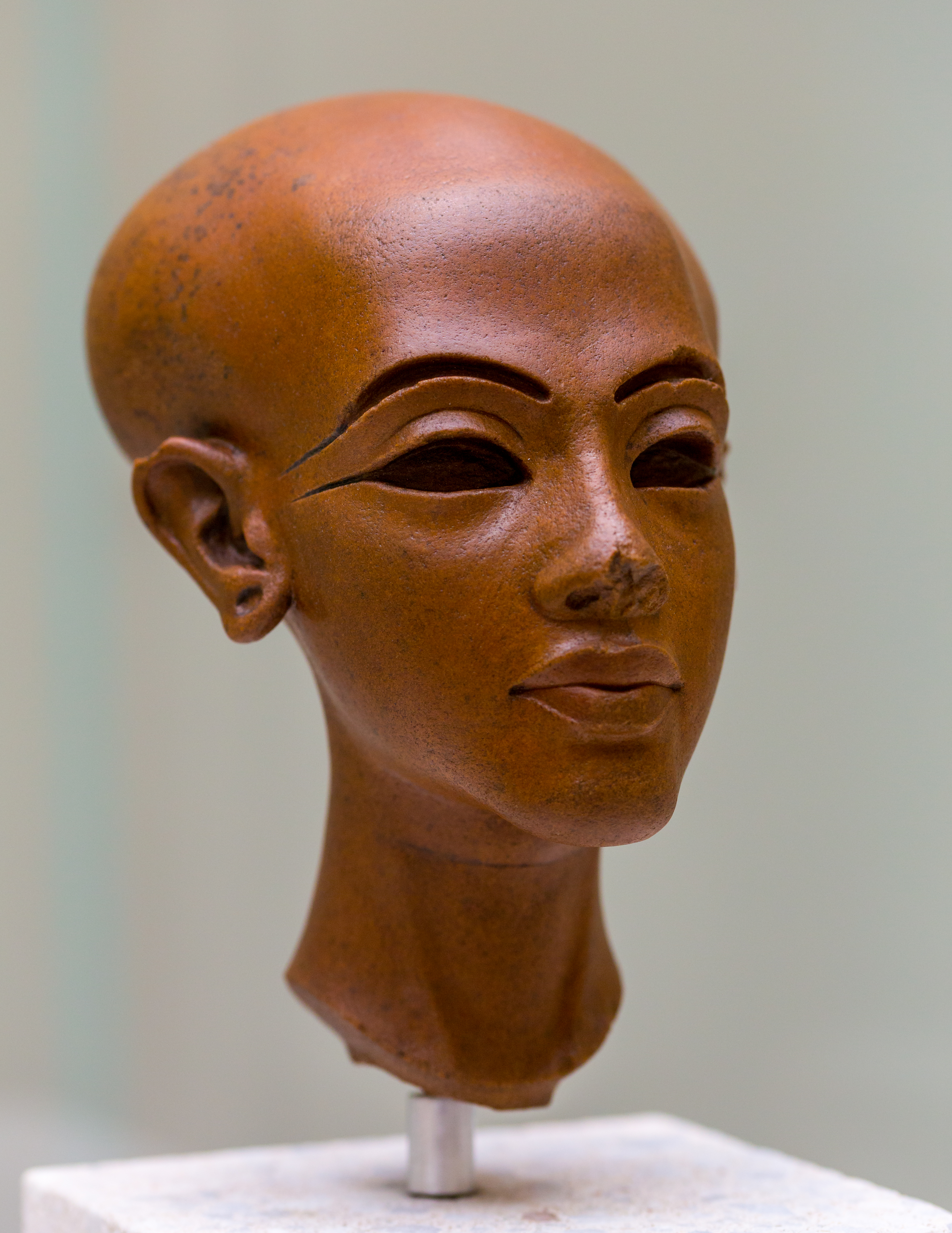
Head of Amarna Princess

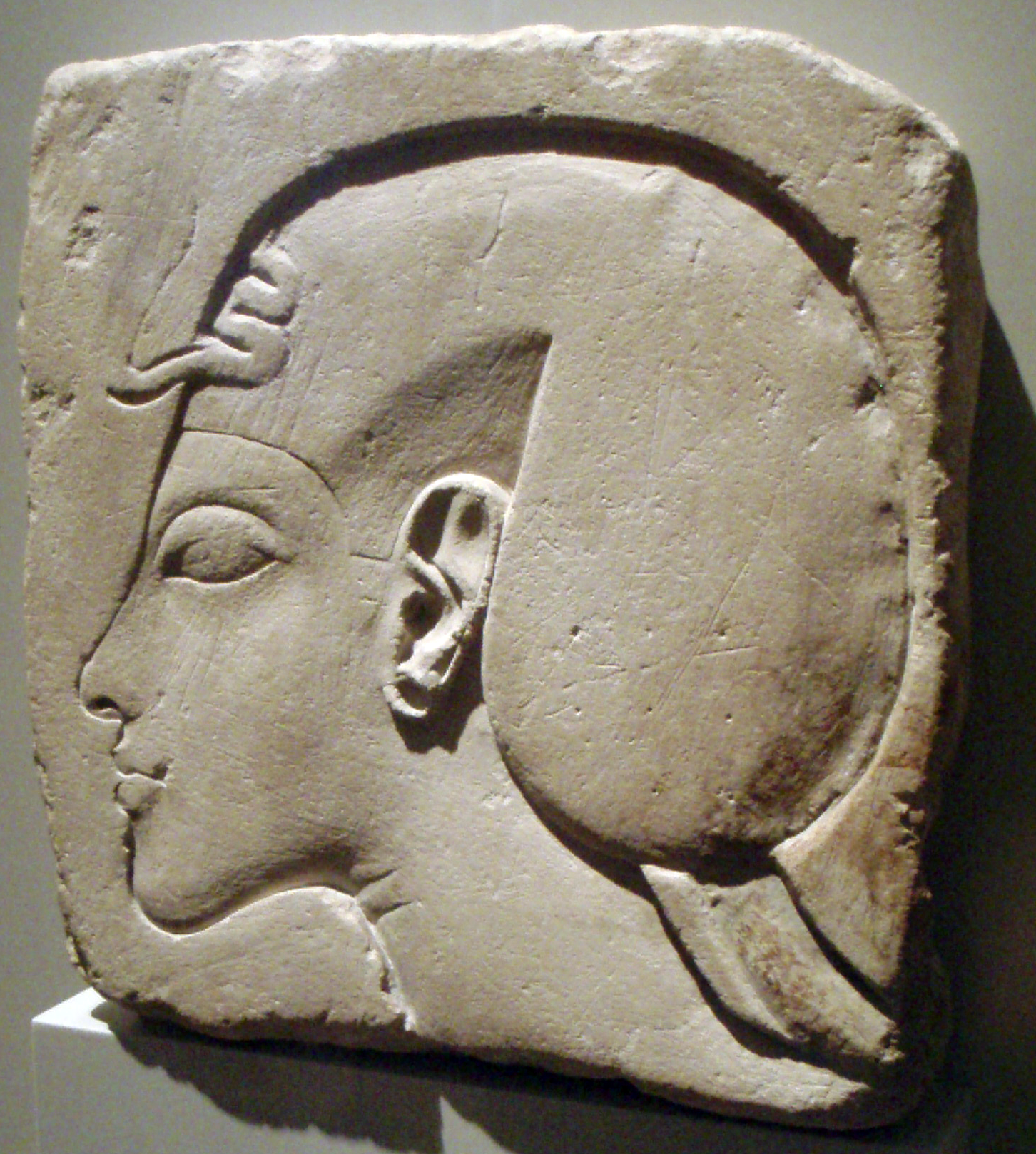
Relief portrait of Akhenaten

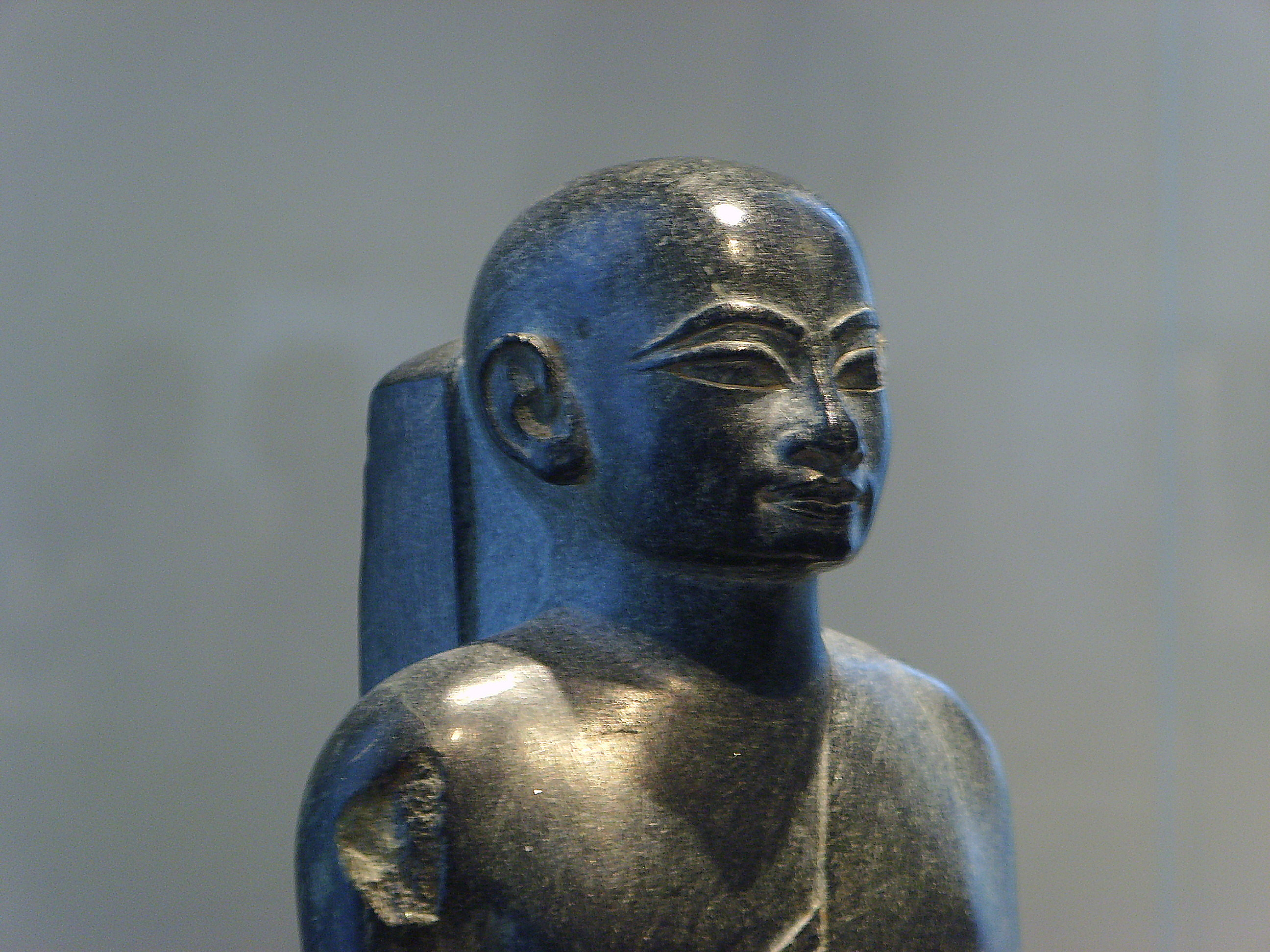
Tai-tai, the Priest. New Kingdom, Eighteenth Dynasty, 1380 BC

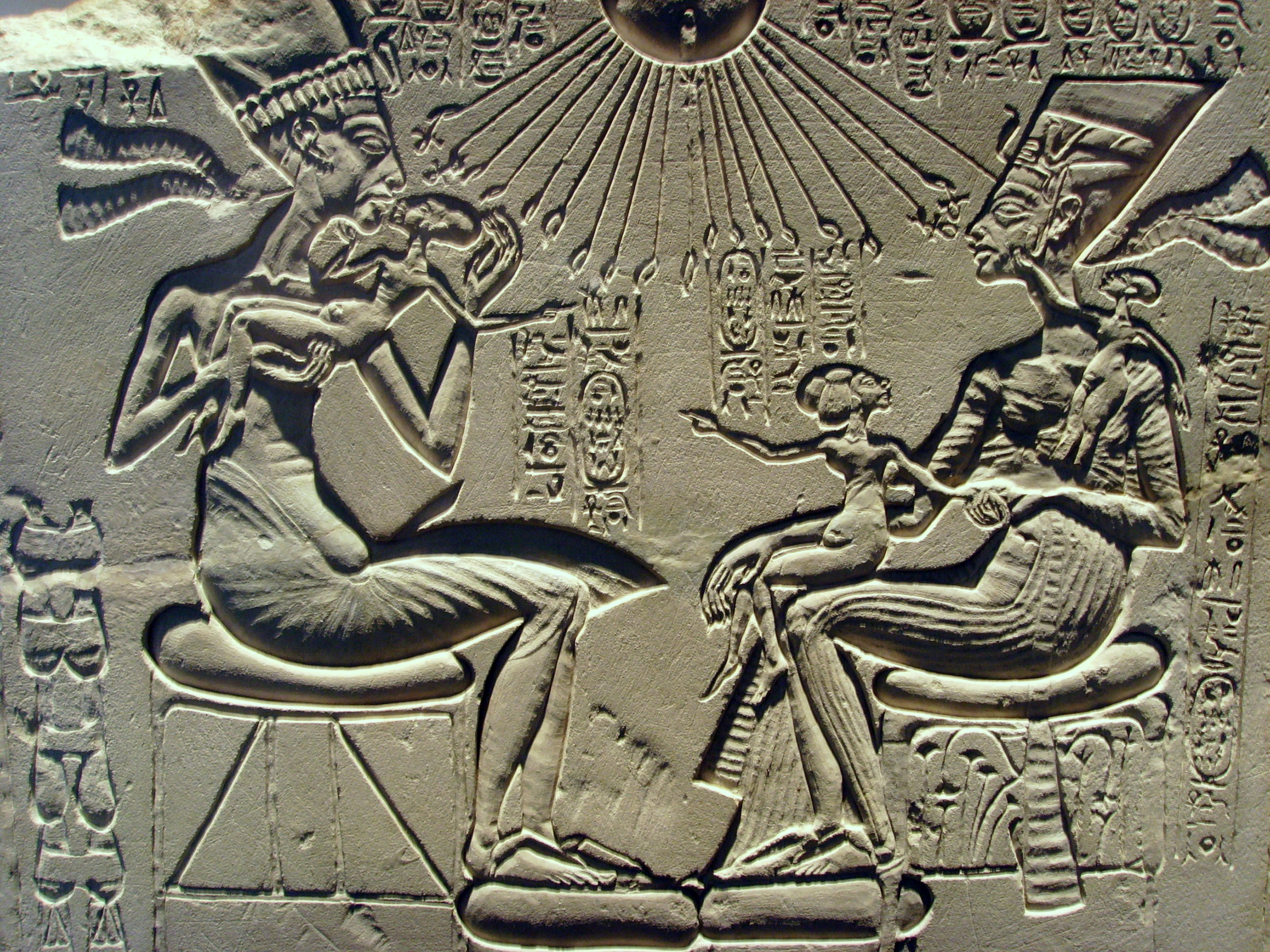
Akhenaten and Nefertiti with their children. Amarna Period, 1350 BC

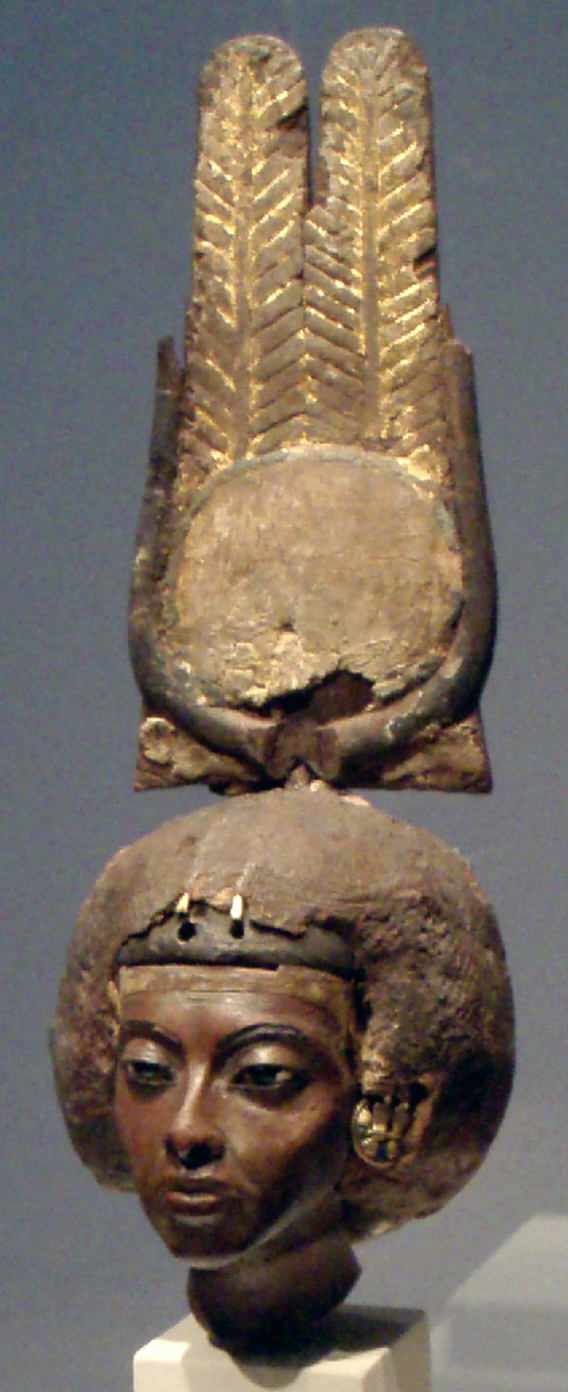
Queen Tiye, Amarna Period, 1355 BC

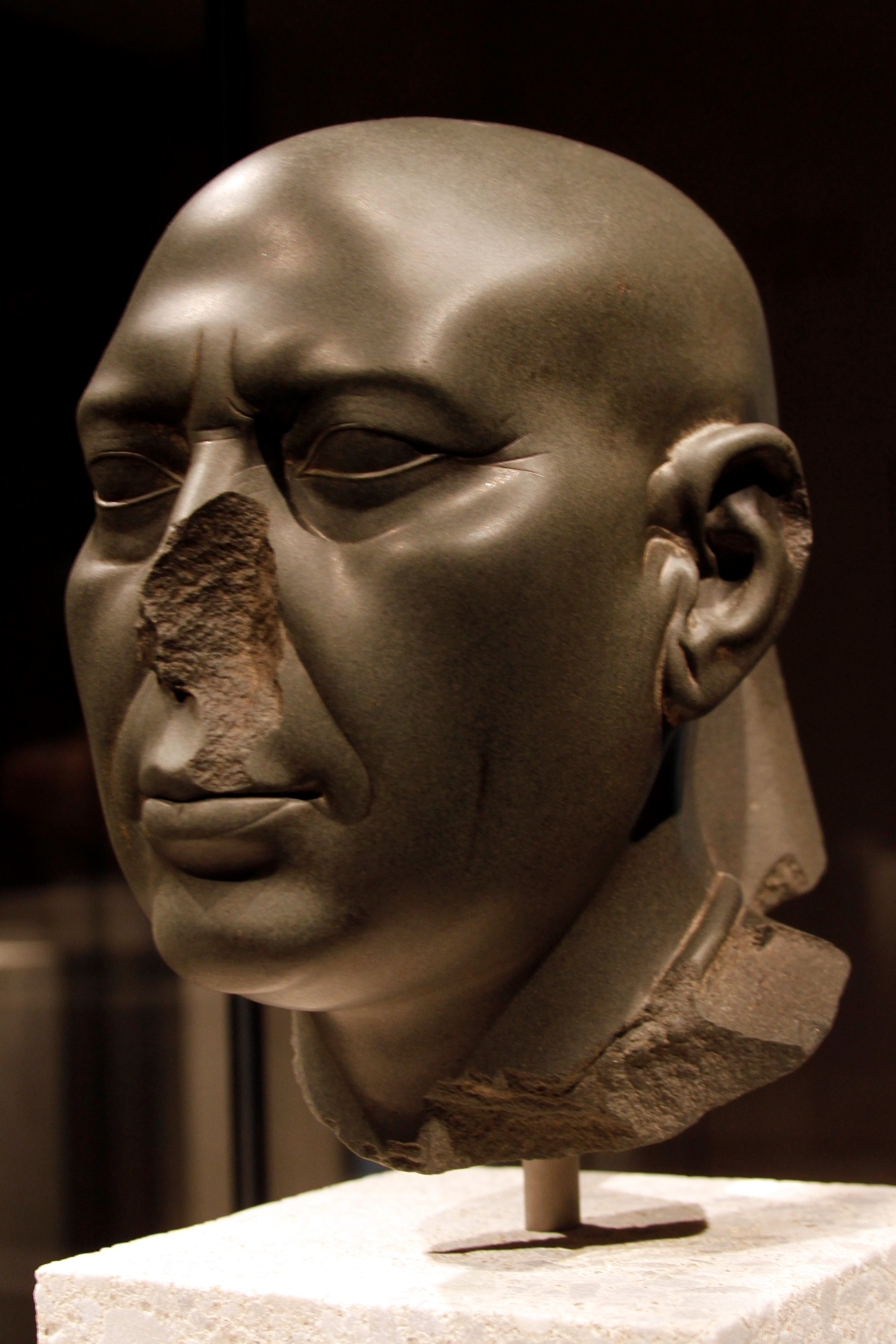
Berlin Green Head, 100-50 BC

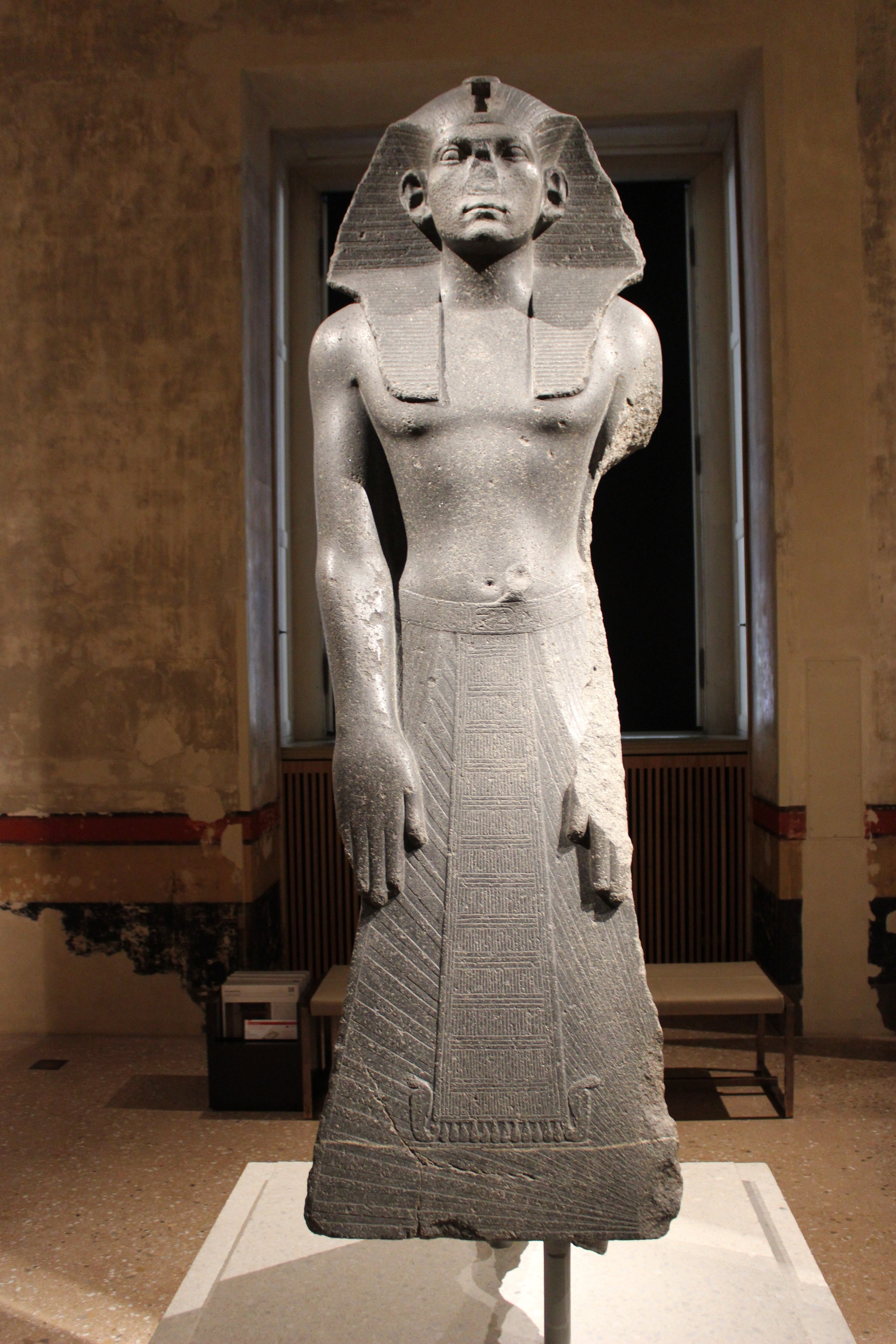
Statue of Amenemhat III (Berlin)

== See also ==
- List of museums of Egyptian antiquities
