= Manefer =

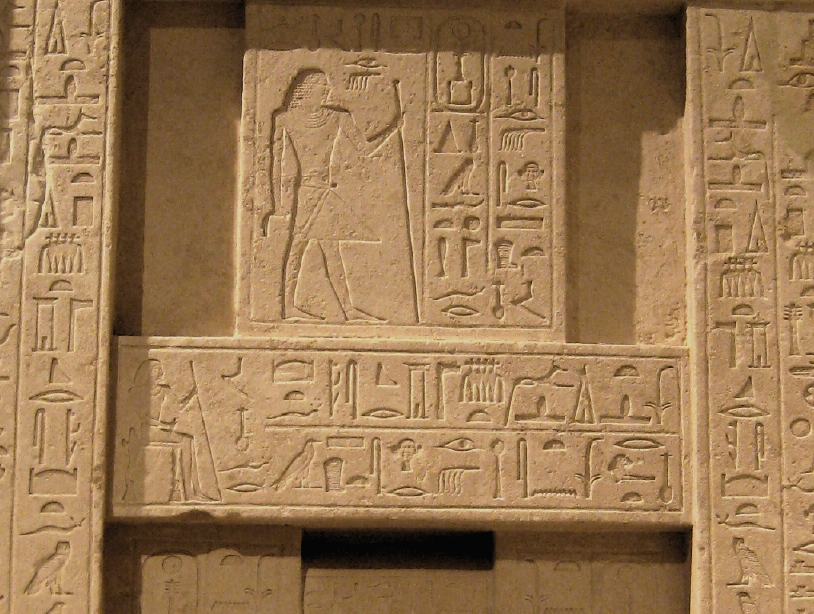
Part of Monofer's false door showng the standing tomb owner

Manefer was member of the Ancient Egyptian court at the end of the 5th or the beginning of the 6th Dynastym around 2400 BC. From his tomb several titles are known, including director of the royal hairdressers and director of the outdiffers of the king ,. He was therefore closely connected to private matters of the king. He was also funerary priest at the pyramid of king Djedkare Isesi and lived therefore under this king or later.

The mastaba of Manefer was known early on but was only fully recorded by the expedition of Karl Richard Lepsius. Tts relief decorated cult chapel was brought to the Egyptian Museum in Berlin. The cult chapel is decorated with a false door showing Manefer. It's inscriptions list his titles. The other walls of the chamber show rows of servants bringing offerings to Manefer.

== Literature ==
- Karl Richard Lepsius] (1849)ː Denkmaeler aus Aegypten und Aethiopien nach den Zeichnungen der von Seiner Majestät dem Koenige von Preussen, Friedrich Wilhelm IV., nach diesen Ländern gesendeten, und in den Jahren 1842–1845 ausgeführten wissenschaftlichen Expedition auf Befehl Seiner Majestät. 13 vols. Berlin: Nicolaische Buchhandlung, 1849, volume II, pls 65-78 (Lepsius tomb 17)
- Jones, Dilwyn (2000). An Index of Ancient Egyptian Titles, Epithets and Phrases of the Old Kingdom. Oxford: Archaeopress. ISBN 978-1841710716.
