= Anthony Charles Harris =

British antiquarian

Anthony Charles Harris (1790–1869) was a collector of ancient Egyptian papyri. As antiquary, merchant, and official supplier of the army he was based in Alexandria, Egypt for the last four decades of his life. He made many journeys on the Nile to Upper Egypt where he acquired papyri and artefacts. An amateur, he had a good understanding of hieroglyphs, as was acknowledged by Heinrich Karl Brugsch.

His collection included

- The Great Harris Papyrus, also known as Papyrus Harris I, mostly lists of temple endowments by Ramses III, but also some historical writings, which Harris acquired in 1855
- The Papyrus Harris II
- The Papyrus Harris 500, a literary papyrus containing two tales and poetry
- The Papyrus Harris 501 which contained a magical text

Selima Harris, his natural daughter, offered his collection for sale in 1871 for £10,000; and it was bought by Samuel Birch of the British Museum in 1872.

Father and daughter are buried in the British Protestant Cemetery near the demolished Rosetta Gate in Alexandria, Egypt.
