= The Taking of Joppa =

Ancient Egyptian tale

"The Taking of Joppa" is an ancient Egyptian tale describing the conquest of the Canaanite town of Yapu (Joppa) by Thutmose III's general Djehuty. The extant copy of the text is on the verso of Papyrus Harris 500.

This tale is traditionally regarded as a purely literary account of the conquest set in the wake of Thutmose III's campaigning in Syria. There was, however, a troop commander named Djehuty who served under Thutmose III.

== Synopsis ==
(The beginning of the tale is lost.) Djehuty invites the prince of Joppa to a party in his camp outside the town. He knocks him out, hides two hundred of his soldiers in sacks which he has loaded onto pack animals, and sends a charioteer to announce to the town that the Egyptians have surrendered and are sending tribute. Introduced into the city the hidden Egyptian soldiers emerge and conquer it.

== Comparative literature ==
The tactic of deception used in the Trojan Horse tale in the Odyssey and "Ali Baba and the Forty Thieves" in One Thousand and One Nights are reminiscent of the tactic of deception used by Djehuty in the Taking of Joppa story. The ancient Egyptian Taking of Joppa predates the Odyssey's literary setting by more than 200 years and predates the Arabian story by multiple millennia.

== History ==
Despite the literary tradition and the character of its telling, the excavators of Jaffa have recently argued that a Late Bronze Age destruction of the Egyptian garrison, dated to between 1456 and 1400 BC, may have formed the historical basis of this tale. This proposal is supported by the publication of an extensive site-wide destruction level containing Egyptian vessels dated to the mid-Eighteenth Dynasty, including vessels of types attested in the reign of Amenhotep II. Together these and Cypriot ceramics suggest a date in the late 15th century BC, connected perhaps with the insurgency at Aphek quelled in the seventh year of Amenhotep II, 1418 BC. The excavators would attribute the destruction to the Canaanite insurgency during which the Egyptians lost their fortress within a short time after Thutmose III established the garrison. The story therefore relates the events of the retaking of Jaffa probably immediately preceding the campaign against Aphek and not Thutmose III's conquest or taking of the site as some have argued.

== Bibliography ==
- Burke, Aaron Alexander. "Early Jaffa: From the Bronze Age to the Persian Period," in The History and Archaeology of Jaffa 1, edited by M. Peilstöcker and A. A. Burke, pp. 63–78. The Jaffa Cultural Heritage Project 1. Monumenta Archaeologica 26, A. A. Burke and M. Peilstöcker, general editor, Cotsen Institute of Archaeology, Los Angeles.
- Burke, Aaron Alexander, and Krystal V. Lords. "Egyptians in Jaffa: A Portrait of Egyptian Presence in Jaffa during the Late Bronze Age." Near Eastern Archaeology Vol. 73, No. 1 (2010), pp. 2–30.
- Fritz Hintze, "Untersuchungen zu Stil und Sprache neuagyptischer Erzahlungen", in Journal of Near Eastern Studies, Vol. 11, No. 3 (Jul., 1952), pp. 227–230
- William Matthew Flinders Petrie, Egyptian Tales: Translated from the Papyri, London 1895
