= Head of Young Nefertiti =

Ancient Egyptian sculptural portrait

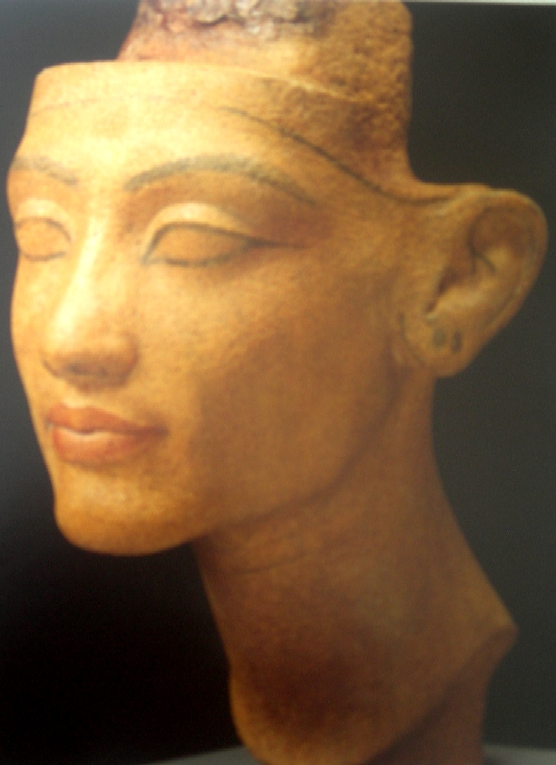
- Artist: Workshop of Thutmose
- Year: c. 14th century BC
- Catalogue: AE 21220
- Dimensions: 29 cm (11 in)
- Location: Neues Museum, Berlin

Head of Young Nefertiti ("Head of the Queen", "The Beauty") is an unfinished sculptural portrait of Queen Nefertiti, made of sandstone. It was discovered in 1912 in the suburbs of Akhetaten by an expedition of the German Oriental Society led by the German Egyptologist Ludwig Borchardt. Along with other valuables, the sculpture was taken from Germany to the USSR during World War II. Until 1958, it was kept in the State Hermitage Museum, after which it was returned to the Egyptian Museum of Berlin, where it is currently housed.

== Discovery history ==
The sculpture was discovered at Tel el-Amarna during excavations of the ancient city of Akhetaten, conducted under the auspices of the German Oriental Society by an archaeological expedition led by Ludwig Borchardt. It was found in one of the rooms of the house of the ancient Egyptian sculptor Thutmose, together with dozens of other works, including the famous Bust of Nefertiti and sculptures depicting Pharaoh Akhenaten and his entourage.

== Description ==
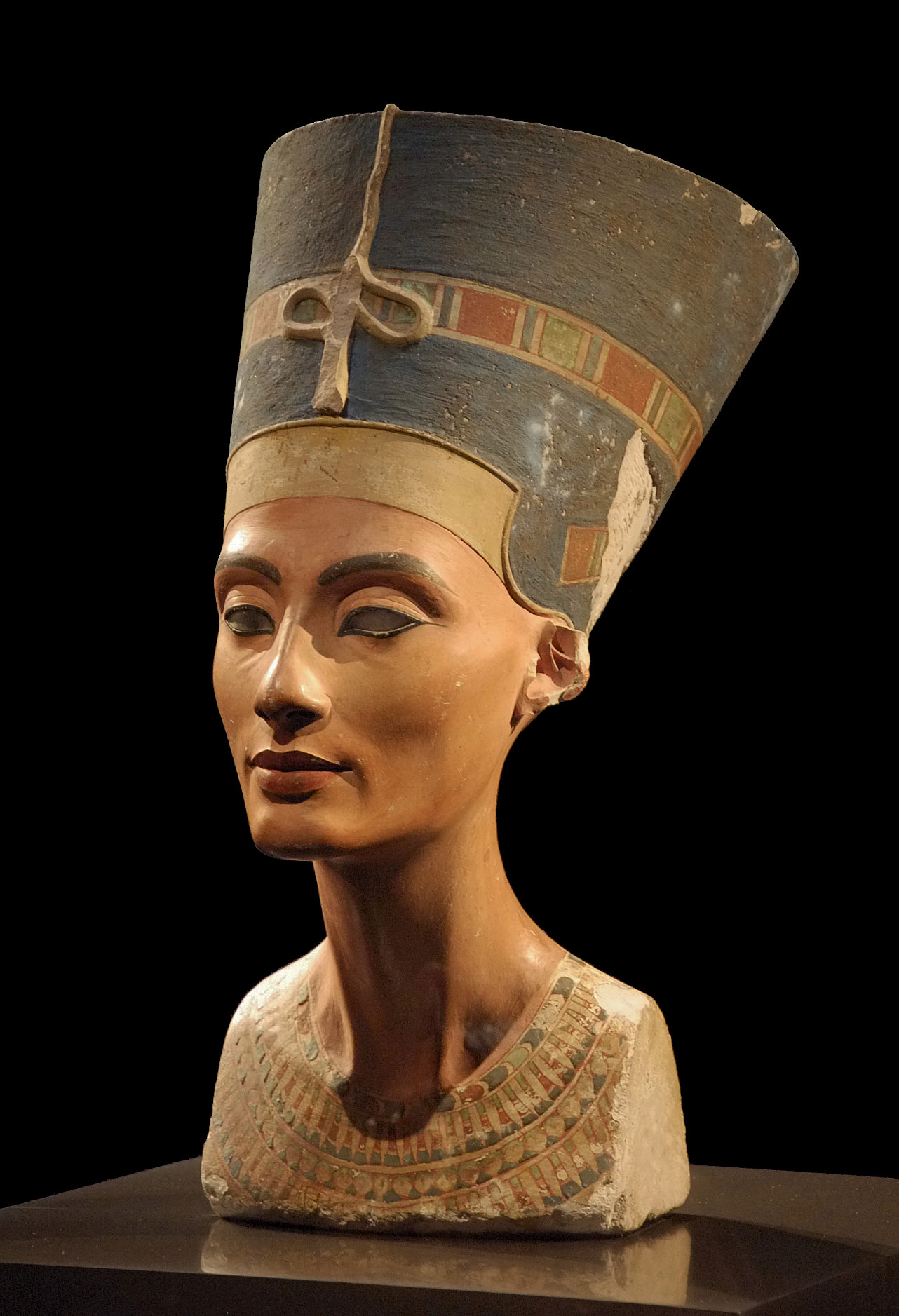
Bust of Nefertiti. Neues Museum, Berlin (inv. AM 21300)

The Head of Young Nefertiti is made of crystalline sandstone. Its dimensions are 29 × 14.9 × 16.5 cm. The work is unfinished: the ears have not been completed, the eyes were never inlaid, and the surface of the stone was not fully worked. Nevertheless, the sculpture is painted: the eyes and eyebrows are outlined, and a curved band of the same color used for the eyebrows is visible on the forehead and ears. The rounded projection at the top of the sculpture suggests that a headdress or crown was once attached to it.

The Head of Young Nefertiti is close in style and execution to the Bust of Nefertiti (see illustration on the right), which suggests that both were created by the same sculptor. The Soviet Egyptologist and specialist in the Amarna period, Yuri Perepyolkin, comparing the two works, noted:

One head is of limestone, painted, with a tall blue crown, with refined facial features in which calm friendliness is almost overshadowed by an expression of aloofness. The other head is of sandstone, in its natural color... with a face of serene tenderness, with an extraordinary smile, infinitely quiet and restrained.

== The Sculpture in Russia ==
The sculpture is considered a looted art. During World War II, it was taken from Germany to the Soviet Union as part of compensatory restitution. Until 1958, it was kept and exhibited in the State Hermitage Museum; later, along with other items—such as the Pergamon Altar, the Sistine Madonna, and others—it was returned to Germany. In a letter dated May 27, 1955, the Hermitage director Mikhail Artamonov proposed to the USSR Minister of Culture Nikolai Mikhailov that a number of objects from the Amarna period, including this sculpture, should not be returned but retained in the Hermitage. However, his request was not granted.

It is currently housed in the Egyptian Museum of Berlin (inventory number AE 21220).

In 2009, the sculpture temporarily returned to Russia for the exhibition "The Beautiful Has Come: Masterpieces of Portraiture from the Egyptian Museum in Berlin", held at the State Hermitage Museum from June 23 to September 20.
