= German Oriental Society =

German Oriental Society may refer to:

- Deutsche Morgenländische Gesellschaft, established in Leipzig in 1845 as a scholarly organization dedicated to studies of Asia
- Deutsche Orient-Gesellschaft, established in Berlin in 1898 for archaeological research
