= James Simon (art collector) =

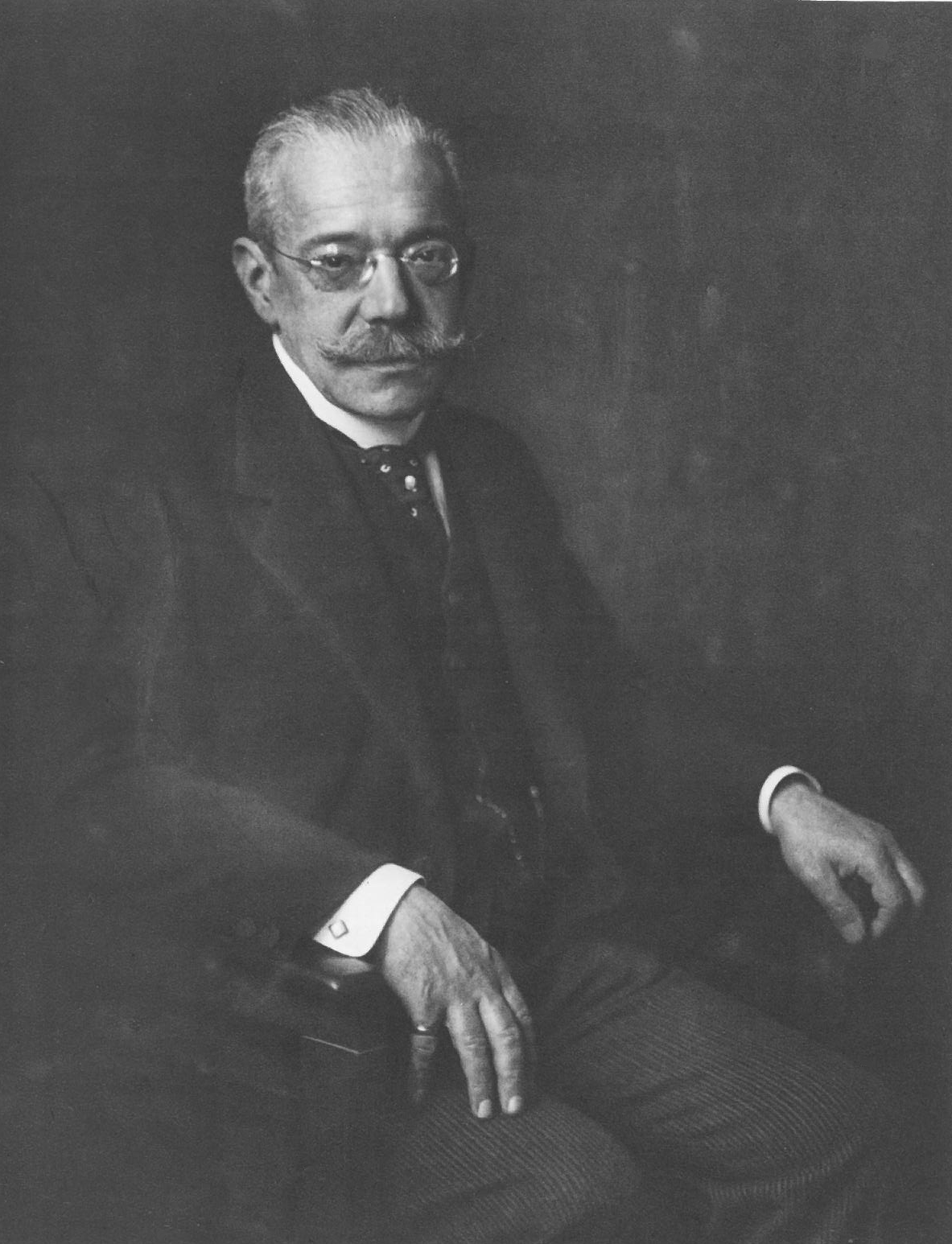
James Simon, about 1895

Henri James Simon (17 September 1851 – 23 May 1932) was a German-Jewish entrepreneur, art collector, philanthropist and patron of the arts during the Wilhelmine period. He donated most of his significant collections to the Berlin State Museums, including the famous Nefertiti Bust.

== Biography ==
Henri James Simon was born in Berlin, the son of a well-off Jewish cotton merchant. He attended the Berlinisches Gymnasium zum Grauen Kloster and received a six-month traineeship at Bradford, then a centre of textile manufacture, before he became a partner with his father in 1876. Though a reserved man, he played an influential role in the German society, especially by his participation at a regular roundtable with Emperor Wilhelm II. Simon and other invitees like Albert Ballin and Carl Fürstenberg as well as Emil and Walther Rathenau discussed economic life and tried to give the emperor an understanding of a Jewish perspective on social issues. Their close relationship with the erratic ruler was criticized by Zionist contemporaries and they were later mocked as the "Emperor's Jews" (Kaiserjuden) by Chaim Weizmann.

James Simon died in Berlin and is buried at the Jewish cemetery on Schönhauser Allee in Prenzlauer Berg. Wilhelm II sent a wreath from his Dutch exile. Parts of his collection that were not donated to the state museums were auctioned.

== Art collecting ==
Simon shared an interest for archaeology with Wilhelm II. In 1898, he was one of the founders of the Deutsche Orient-Gesellschaft in collaboration with Wilhelm von Bode. In 1911, Simon provided the financing of Ludwig Borchardt's excavations at Pharaoh Akhenaten's city in Amarna, and many of the found artefacts, which included the sculpted busts of Nefertiti and Tiye from a court sculptor's workshop outside the main tomb area, became his property. This acquisition, which was according to a 1913 partition treaty with the Egyptian Département des antiquités under Gaston Maspero, is still disputed. They were taken to his villa on Tiergartenstraße No. 15a with the intention of creating a public collection. In his later years, he placed various parts of his collection on permanent loan, first to the Kaiser-Friedrich-Museum, which opened in 1904, and then to the Egyptian Museum in 1920.

A new building designed by David Chipperfield was added and named for him on Museum Island in Berlin, Germany.

== Philanthropy ==
Simon was one of early donors to the Technion – Israel Institute of Technology in Haifa. He helped to underwrite Jewish German societies, and funded Germany's first public swimming pool.

== See also ==
- James Simon Gallery
