= Deutsche Orient-Gesellschaft =

German organization for Near Eastern studies

The Deutsche Orient-Gesellschaft (German: [ˈdɔʏtʃə ˈoːʁi̯ɛnt ɡəˈzɛlʃaft], German Oriental Society), abbreviated DOG, is a German voluntary association based in Berlin dedicated to the study of the Near East.

The DOG was officially founded in January 1898 to foster public interest in oriental antiquities, and to promote related archaeological research. It competed with similar organizations in France and England, and reflected an increased enthusiasm to learn about the Bible lands in the late 19th century. DOG focused on the cultures of the Middle East from early times to the Islamic period.

The founders of the DOG included a number of well-connected members of German society, including Henri James Simon and banker Franz von Mendelssohn. Their wealth enabled the DOG to undertake expensive excavations in the Middle East. Kaiser Wilhelm II developed an interest in archaeology and took the DOG under his protection from 1901, funding excavations with grants from Imperial funds. It was officially a subsidiary of the German museum administration, so its finds automatically belonged to the Prussian state. Further, its activities were aided by friendly relations established between the German and Ottoman Empires.

The DOG's activities were interrupted by the World Wars. The DOG was reestablished in 1947, and celebrated its centennial at the Pergamon Museum in Berlin in 1998.

== Excavations ==
DOG undertook excavations in Babylon from 1899 to 1917, directed by Robert Koldewey, uncovering the Ishtar Gate, the palaces of Nebuchadnezzar, and the Hanging Gardens of Babylon. Koldewey also claimed to have discovered the Tower of Babel.

Ludwig Borchardt led DOG excavations in Egypt in 1902 at the Ancient Egyptian necropolis of Abusir and then, from 1911 to 1914, at the ruins of Tell el-Amarna, where the famous bust of Nefertiti, now in Berlin's Ägyptisches Museum, was discovered among other sculptural artefacts in the workshop of the sculptor Thutmose.

Walter Andrae led DOG excavations at Assyrian capital of Assur from 1903 to 1914, and Hugo Winckler excavated at Boğazköy in Turkey from 1906 to 1911, uncovering the capital of the Hittite Empire, Hattuša. Other excavations before the First World War took place at sites at across the Fertile Crescent - in Mesopotamia, Turkey, Palestine and Egypt - including Megiddo, Capernaum, Borsippa, Hatra, Jericho, Kar-Tukulti-Ninurta, and Uruk, but the outbreak of the First World War in August 1914 terminated DOG's excavations.

After the DOG was reestablished following the Second World War, more recent excavations have taken place at Habuba Kabira from 1969 to 1975, at Tall Munbāqa (also Ekalte (Mumbaqat) in northern Syria from 1969 to 2012, near Bogazköy from 1996 to 1999, Sarissa in 1995, Urkesh in 1998, and Qatna in 1999.

The DOG produces the annual publications, Mitteilungen der Deutschen Orient-Gesellschaft (MDOG) and Alter Orient aktuell.

== Gallery ==
Some artifacts excavated by the German Oriental Society at Tell el-Amarna, Egypt, 1911-1914:

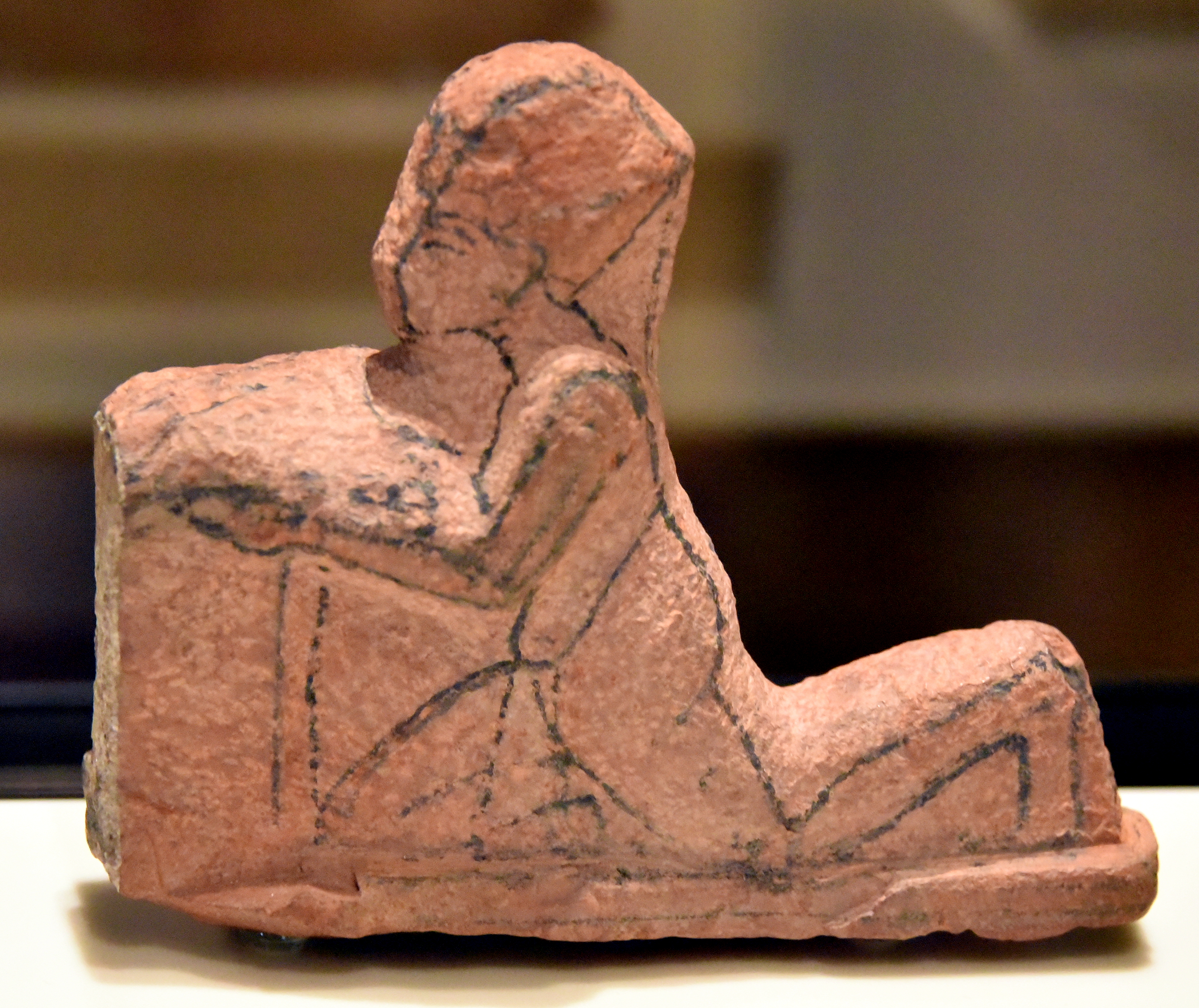
Unfinished figurine of a kneeling Egyptian pharaoh holding a table. From Amarna, House P47.1, Room 5. Neues Museum, Berlin

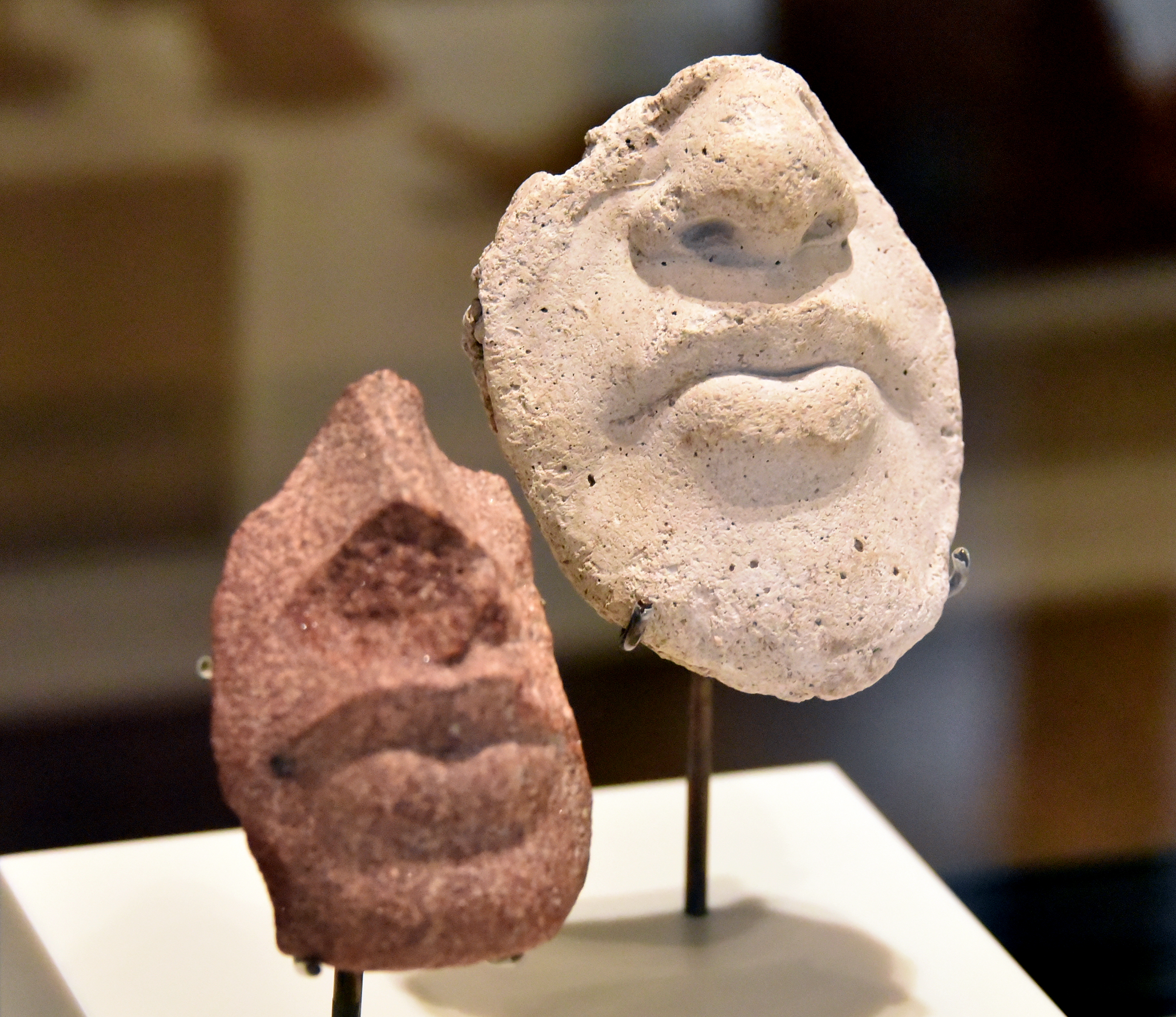
Fragments of a royal portrait, templet of nose and lips. From Egypt, Amarna, Neues Museum, Berlin

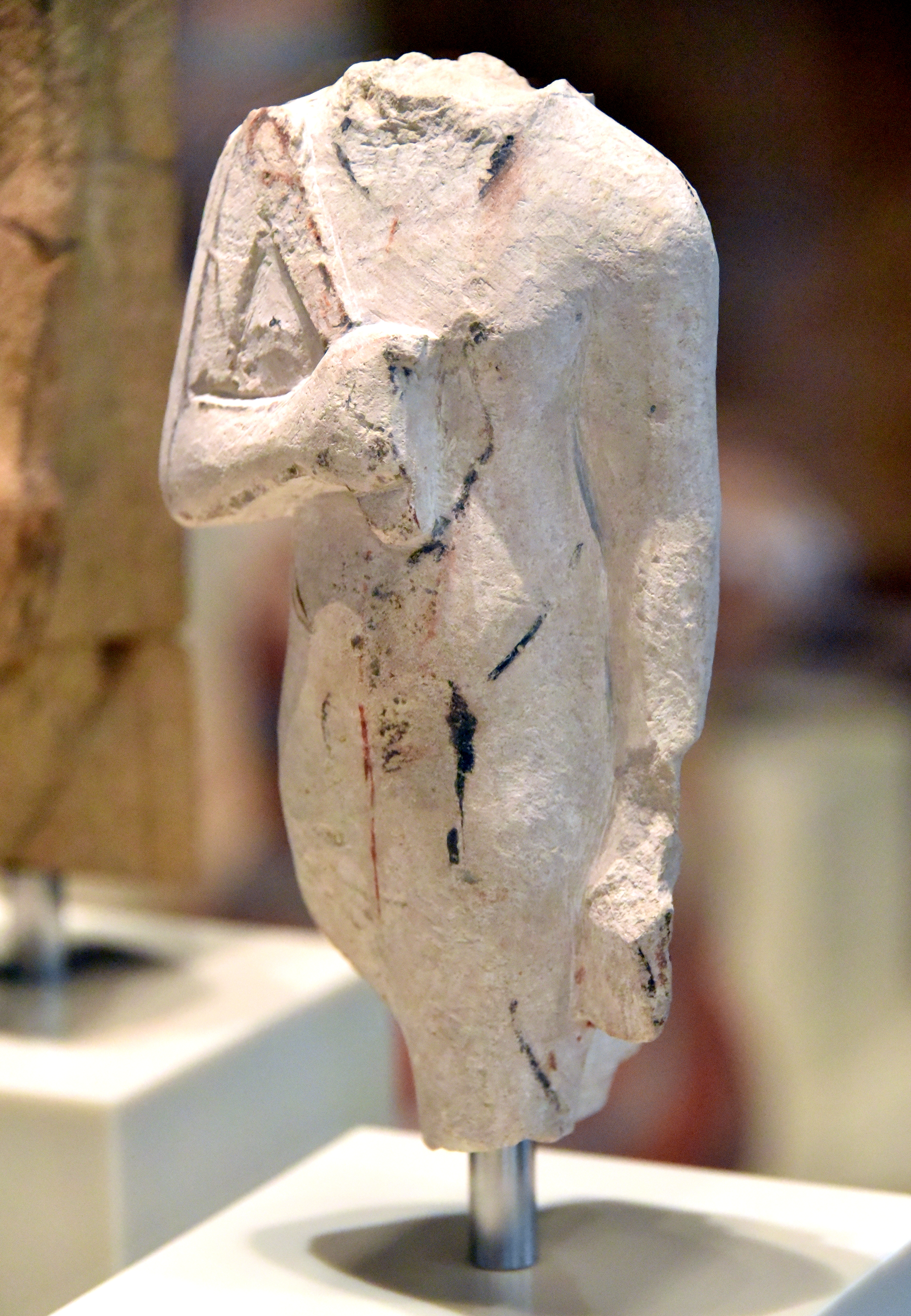
Unfinished statuette of an Amarna pharaoh. From Egypt, Amarna, House P47.2, Neues Museum, Berlin

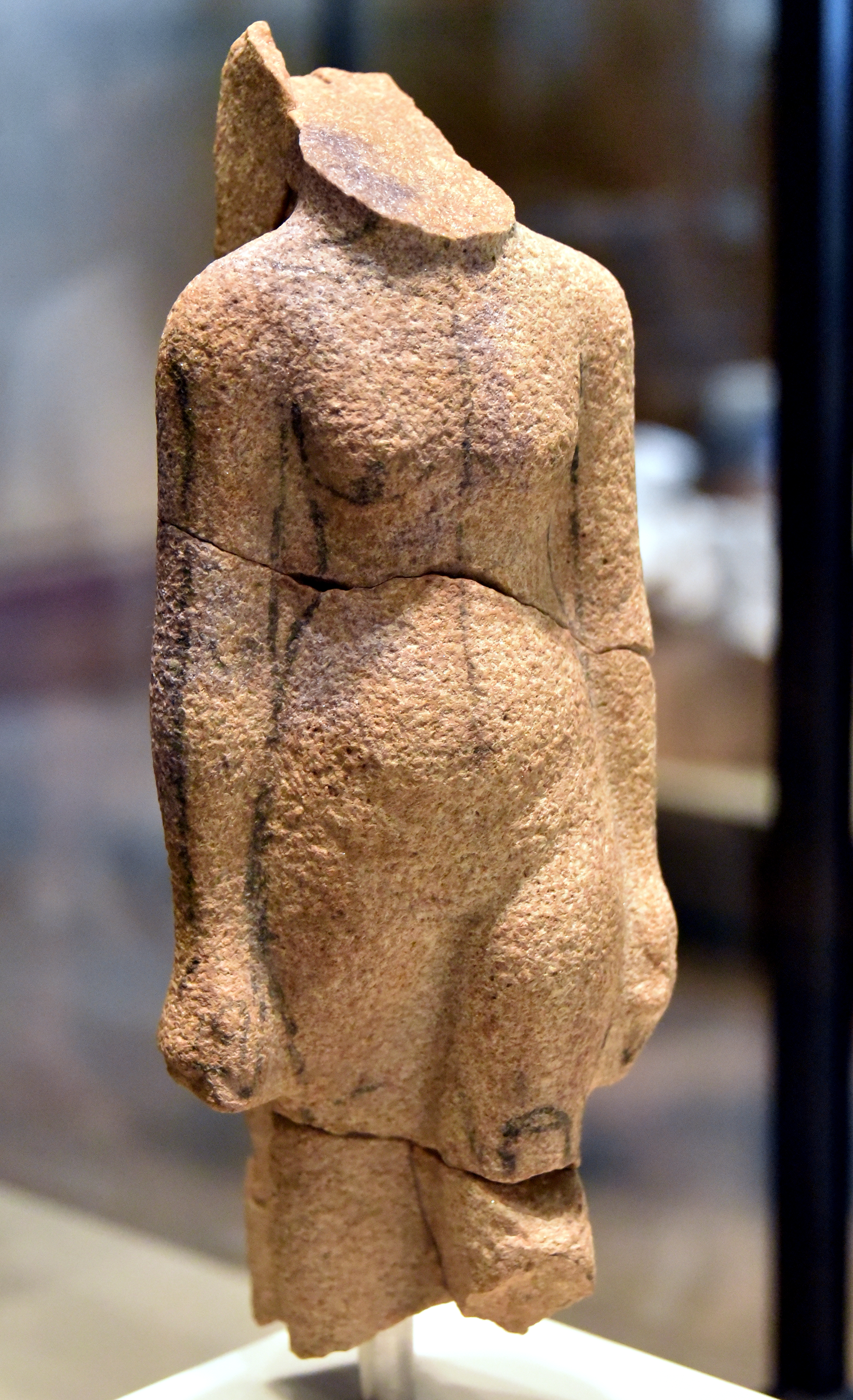
Unfinished statuette of an Amarna Queen or Princess. From Egypt, Amarna, House P47.2, Room 5. Neues Museum, Berlin

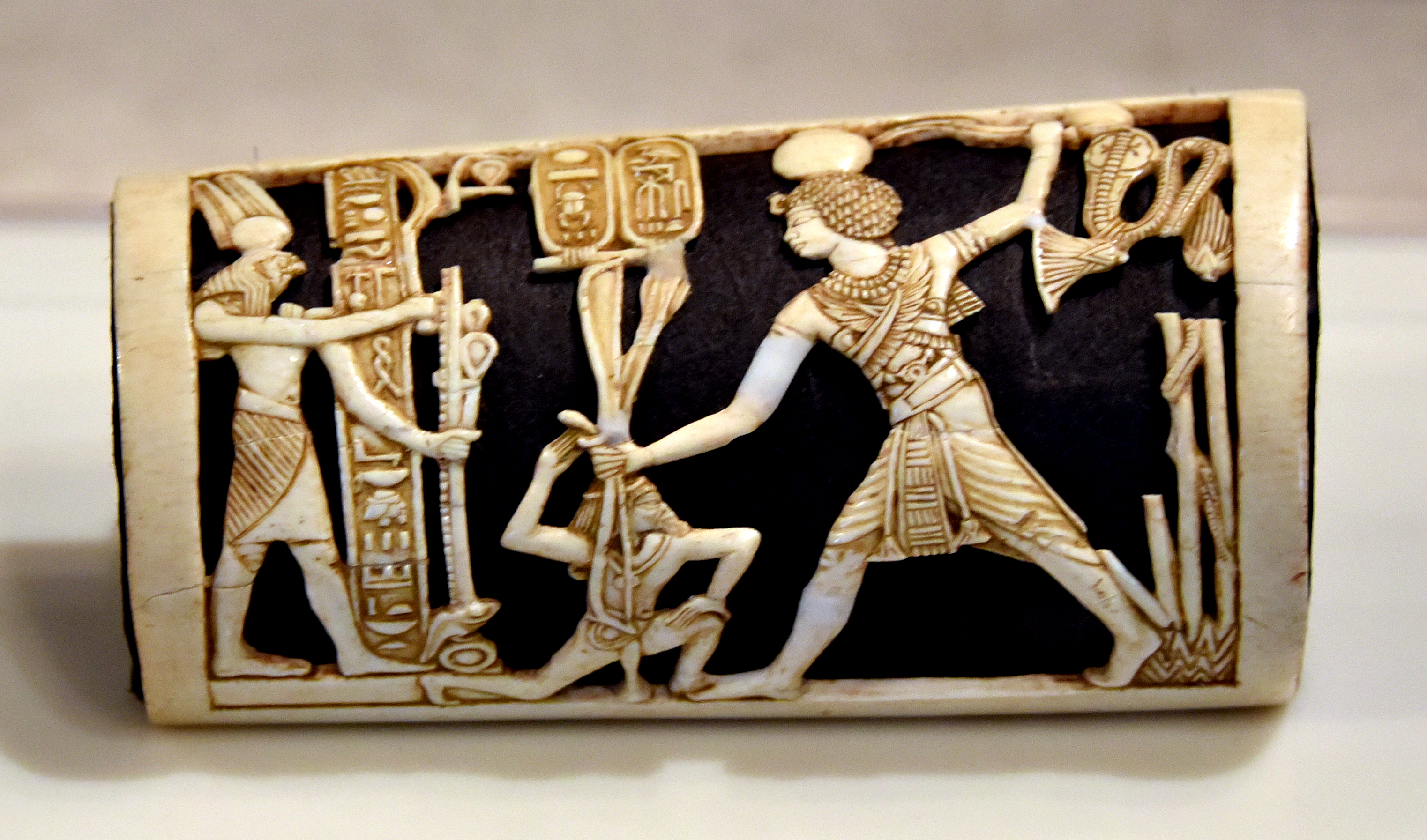
Bracer of Pharaoh Thutmose IV. From Amarna, House P 48.1, Egypt. 1397-1388 BCE. Neues Museum, Berlin
