= Gustave Lefebvre =

French Egyptologist

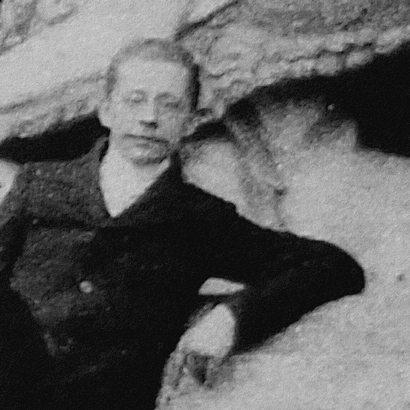
In 1901

Gustave Lefebvre (17 July 1879 – 1 November 1957) was a French Egyptologist.

During the 1910s he worked as an inspector of antiquities for the Sultanate of Egypt and approved the controversial export of the Nefertiti Bust to Germany. His works included two books on the history of the High Priests of Amun, and one on ancient Egyptian medicine.
