= Nefertiti Bust =

Ancient sculpture from Egypt

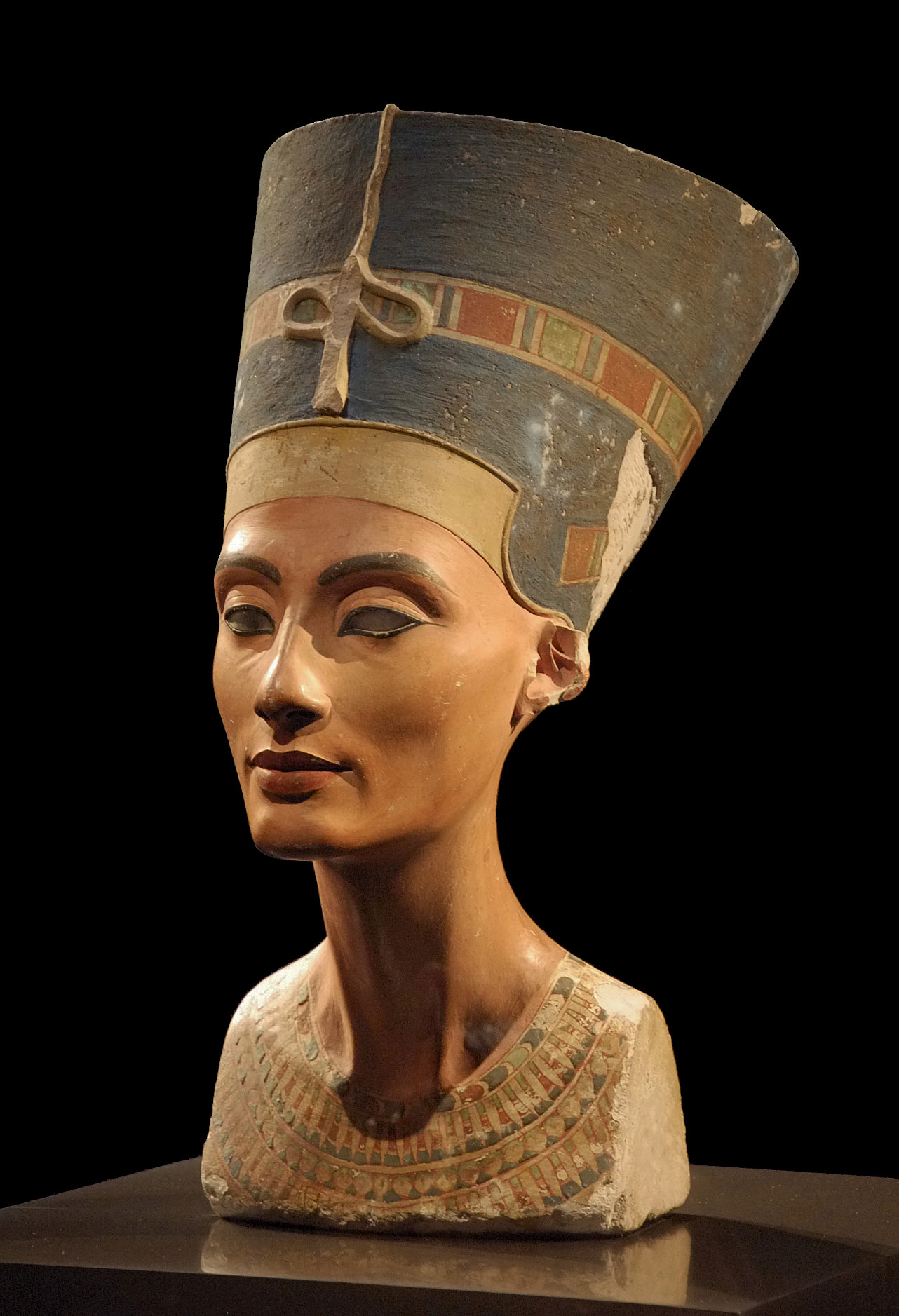
- The bust of Nefertiti is part of the Egyptian Museum of Berlin collection.
- Material: Limestone and stucco
- Height: 48 centimetres (19 in)
- Weight: 20 kilograms (44 lb)
- Created: 1345 BC; Thutmose, Ancient Egypt
- Discovered: 6 December 1912; Amarna, Egypt
- Discovered by: German Oriental Society
- Present location: Neues Museum; Berlin, Germany
- Identification: ÄM 21300
- 3D model (click to interact)

The Nefertiti Bust is a painted stucco-coated limestone bust of Nefertiti, the Great Royal Wife of Egyptian pharaoh Akhenaten. It is on display in the Neues Museum of Berlin.

The work is believed to have been crafted in 1345 BC by Thutmose because it was found in his sculpture workshop in Tell-el Amarna, Egypt. It is one of the most-copied works of ancient Egypt. Nefertiti has become one of the most famous women of the ancient world and an icon of feminine beauty.

A German archaeological team led by Ludwig Borchardt discovered the bust in 1912 during an excavation of the sculptor's workshop. It has been kept at various locations in Germany since its discovery, including the cellar of a bank, a salt-mine in Merkers-Kieselbach, the Dahlem museum, the Egyptian Museum of Berlin and the Altes Museum. It is displayed at the Neues Museum in Berlin, where it was originally displayed before World War II. Egypt has called for the return of the bust, citing provisions that prohibited any items of great archaeological value from leaving Egypt. Egypt accuses Borchardt of "wrapping the bust to conceal its value and smuggling it out of the country".

It has been the subject of an argument between Egypt and Germany over Egyptian demands for its repatriation, which began in 1924, once the bust was first displayed to the public, and more generally it fuelled discussions over the role museums play in undoing colonialism. Today, Egypt continues to demand the repatriation of the bust, whereas German officials and the Berlin Museum assert their ownership by citing an official protocol, signed by the German excavators and the French-led Egyptian Antiquities Service at the time of the excavation.

== History ==
=== Background ===
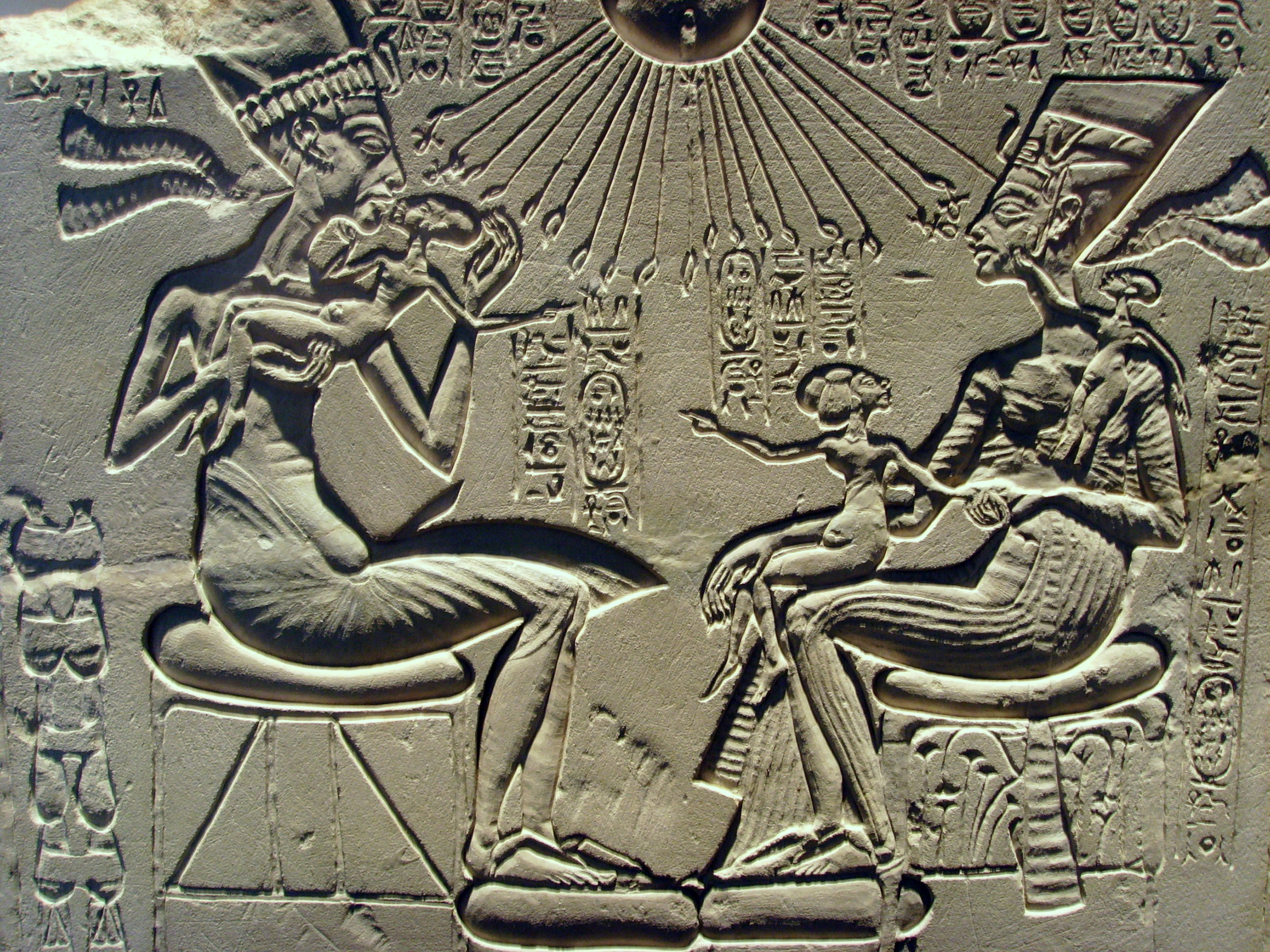
A "house altar" (c. 1350 BC) depicting Akhenaten, Nefertiti and three of their daughters. Nefertiti is shown wearing a crown similar to that depicted on the bust.

Nefertiti (meaning "the beautiful one has come forth") was the 14th-century BC Great Royal Wife (chief consort) of the Egyptian Pharaoh Akhenaten of the Eighteenth Dynasty of Egypt. Akhenaten initiated a new monotheistic form of worship called Atenism dedicated to the Sun disc Aten. Little is known about Nefertiti. Theories suggest she could have been an Egyptian royal by birth, a foreign princess or the daughter of a high government official named Ay, who became pharaoh after Tutankhamun. She may have been the co-regent of Egypt with Akhenaten, who ruled from 1352 BC to 1336 BC. Nefertiti bore six daughters to Akhenaten, one of whom, Ankhesenpaaten (renamed Ankhesenamun after the suppression of the Aten cult), married Tutankhamun, Nefertiti's stepson. While it was once thought that Nefertiti disappeared in the twelfth year of Akhenaten's reign because of her death or because she took a new name, she was still alive in the sixteenth year of her husband's reign according to a limestone quarry inscription found at Deir Abu Hinnis "on the eastern side of the Nile, about ten kilometres [6 miles] north of Amarna", in today's Al-Minya Governorate Nefertiti may have become a pharaoh in her own right for a short time after her husband's death.

The bust of Nefertiti is believed to have been crafted about 1345 BC by the sculptor Thutmose. The bust does not have any inscriptions, but can be certainly identified as Nefertiti by the characteristic crown, which she wears in other surviving (and clearly labelled) depictions, for example the "house altar".

=== Discovery and removal from Egypt ===
The bust was found on 6 December 1912 at Amarna by an archaeological team funded by the German Oriental Company (Deutsche Orient-Gesellschaft – DOG), a voluntary association founded by one of the wealthiest men in Prussia, James Simon, who exported more than 20,000 artefacts from Egypt and Iraq. The team was led by German archaeologist Ludwig Borchardt. The bust was found in what had been the workshop of the sculptor Thutmose, along with other unfinished busts of Nefertiti. Borchardt's diary provides the main written account of the find; he remarks, "Suddenly we had in our hands the most alive Egyptian artwork. You cannot describe it with words. You must see it."

A 1924 document found in the archives of the German Oriental Company recalls a 20 January 1913 meeting between Borchardt and a senior Egyptian official to discuss the division of the archeological finds of 1912 between Germany and Egypt. According to the secretary of the German Oriental Company (who was the author of the document and who was present at the meeting), Borchardt "wanted to save the bust for us", referring to Germany.

While Philipp Vandenberg describes the acquisition as "adventurous and beyond comparison", Time magazine lists it among the "Top 10 Plundered Artifacts". Borchardt showed Egypt's French chief antiques inspector, Gustave Lefebvre, a photograph of the bust "that didn't show Nefertiti in her best light". When Lefebre inspected the artifacts found in the investigation, the bust was already wrapped up in a box sitting in a dimly lit room. It is unknown whether Lefebre "went to the trouble of lifting the bust out of the box". Borchardt also wrongly claimed the bust was made of gypsum, instead of limestone. The German Oriental Society maintains that the finds of the dig were divided fairly, noting that Nefertiti was at the top of the exchange list and that "the inspector could have looked at everything closely at the time".

== Description and examinations ==
The bust is 48 centimetres (19 in) tall and weighs about 20 kilograms (44 lb). It is made of a limestone core covered with painted stucco layers. The face is completely symmetrical and almost intact, but the left eye lacks the inlay present in the right. The iris of the right eye is of inserted quartz with black paint and is fixed with beeswax. The background of the eye-socket is unadorned limestone. Nefertiti wears her characteristic blue crown known as the "Nefertiti cap crown" with a golden diadem band looped around like horizontal ribbons and joining at the back, and an Uraeus (cobra), which is now broken, over her brow. She also wears a broad collar with a floral pattern. The ears have suffered some damage. Gardner's Art Through the Ages suggests that "With this elegant bust, Thutmose may have been alluding to a heavy flower on its slender sleek stalk by exaggerating the weight of the crowned head and the length of the almost serpentine neck."

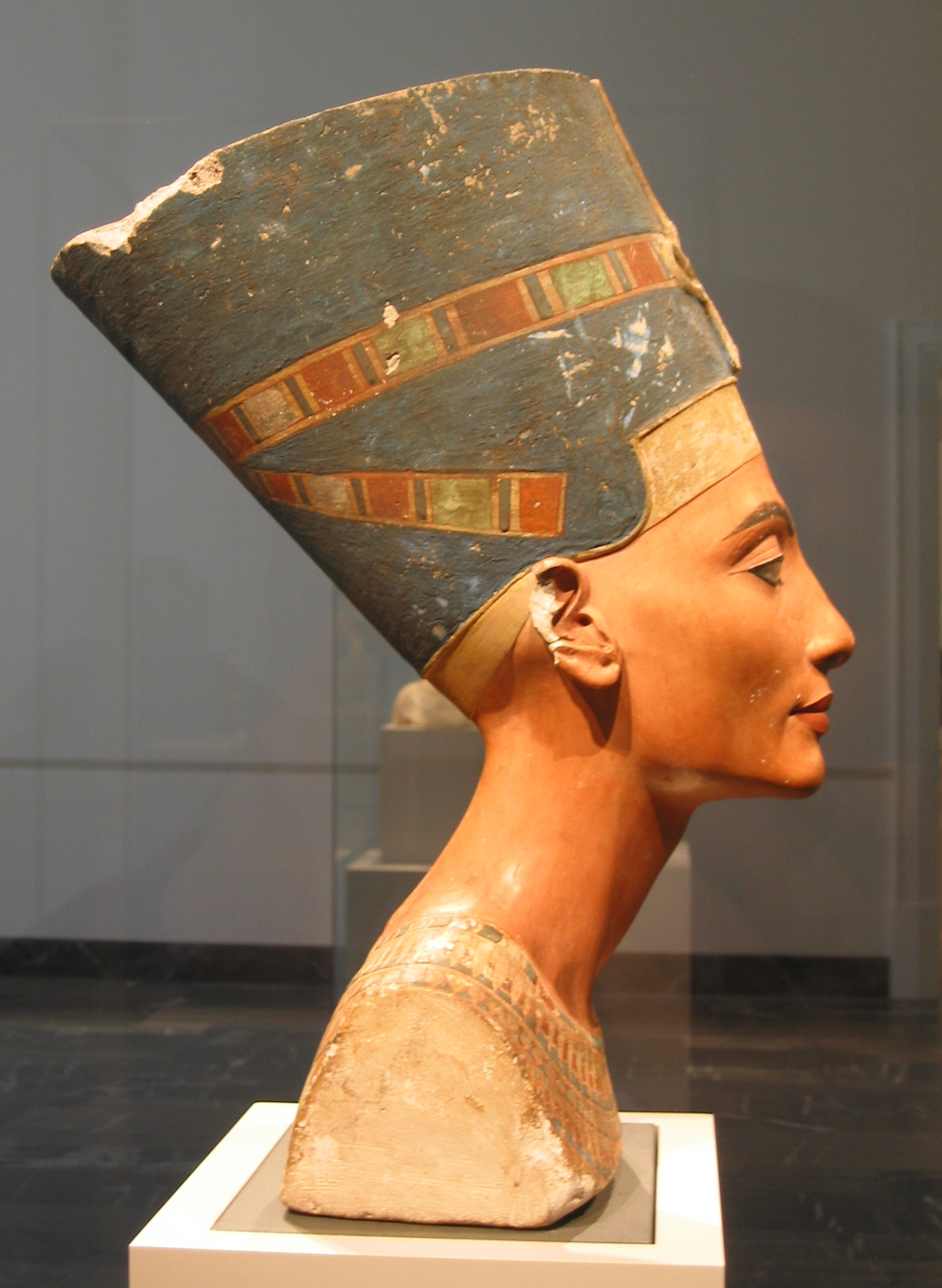
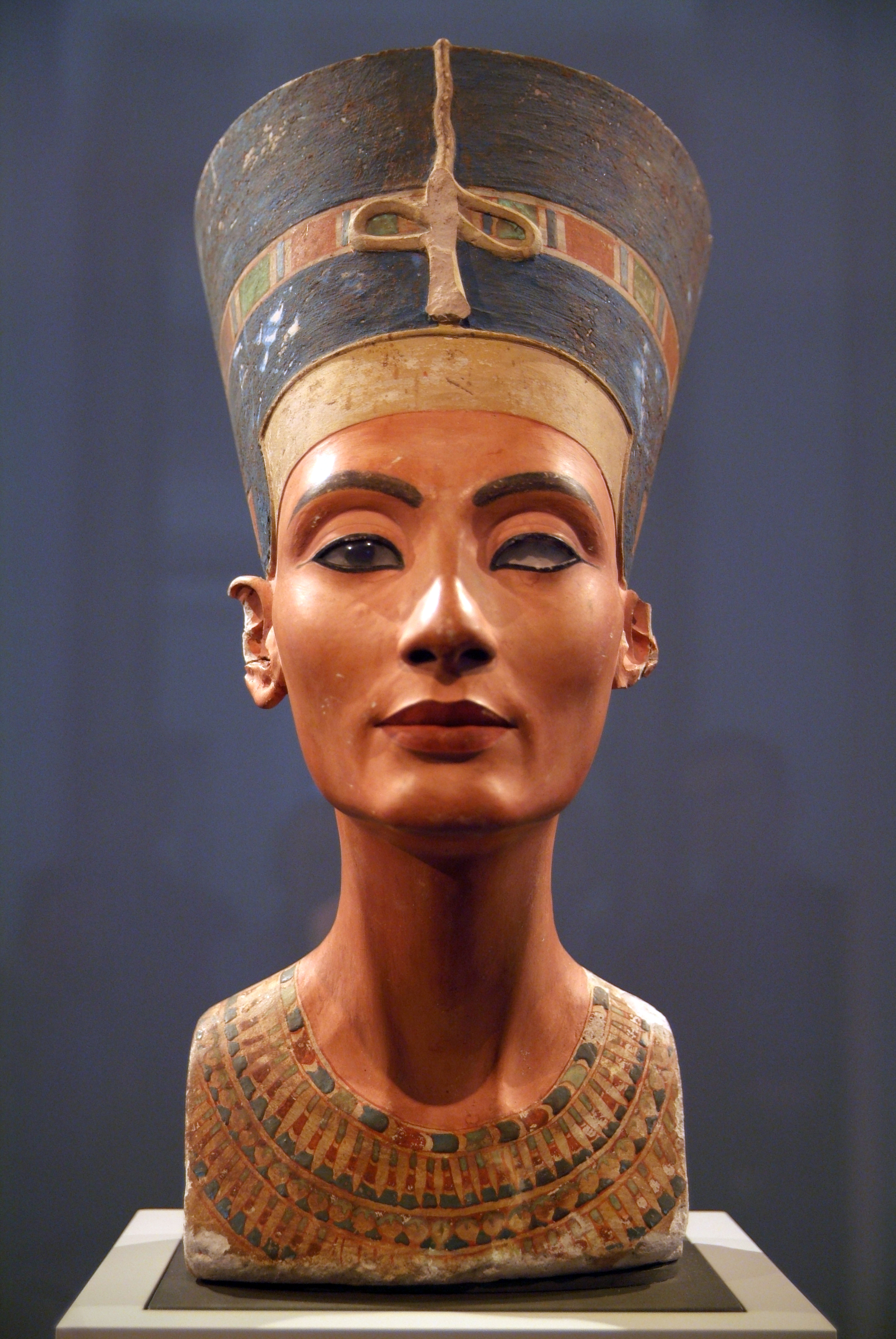
Right profile and front
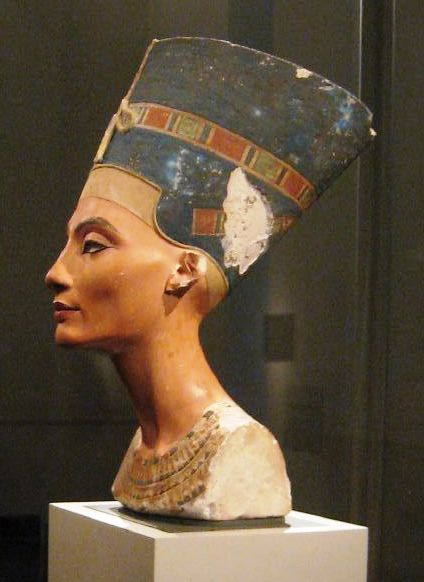
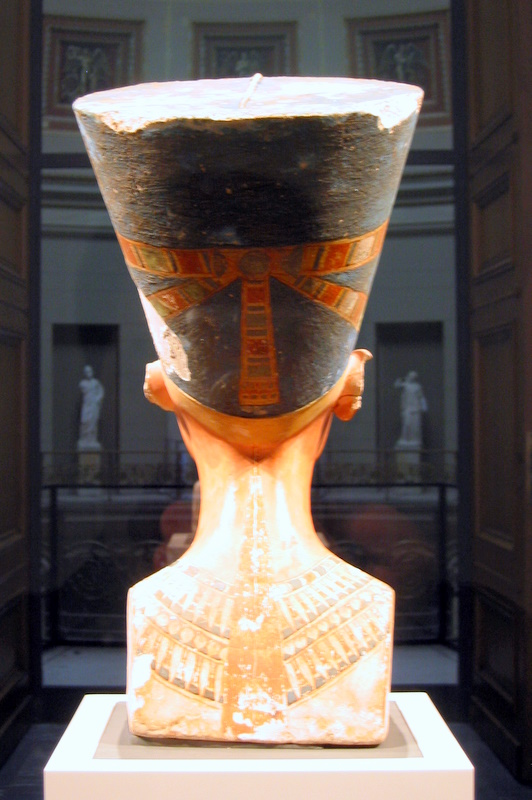
Left profile and back

According to David Silverman, the bust reflects the classical Egyptian art style, deviating from the "eccentricities" of the Amarna art style, which was developed in Akhenaten's reign. The exact function of the bust is unknown, though it is theorized that the bust may have been a sculptor's modello to be used as a basis for other official portraits, kept in the artist's workshop.

=== Colours ===
Borchardt commissioned a chemical analysis of the coloured pigments of the head. The result of the examination was published in the book Portrait of Queen Nofretete in 1923:

- Blue: powdered frit, coloured with copper oxide
- Skin colour (light red): fine powdered lime spar coloured with red chalk (iron oxide)
- Yellow: orpiment (arsenic sulfide)
- Green: powdered frit, coloured with copper and iron oxide
- Black: coal with wax as a binding medium
- White: chalk

=== Missing left eye ===
When the bust was first discovered, no quartz to represent the iris of the left eyeball was present as in the other eye, and none was found despite an intensive search and a then significant reward of £1000 being put up for information regarding its whereabouts. Borchardt assumed that the quartz iris had fallen out when Thutmose's workshop fell into ruin. The missing eye led to speculation that Nefertiti may have suffered from an ophthalmic infection and lost her left eye, though the presence of an iris in other statues of her contradicted this possibility.

Dietrich Wildung proposed that the bust in Berlin was a model for official portraits and was used by the master sculptor for teaching his pupils how to carve the internal structure of the eye, and thus the left iris was not added. Gardner's Art Through the Ages and Silverman present a similar view that the bust was deliberately kept unfinished. Zahi Hawass, former Egyptian Minister of State for Antiquities Affairs, suggested that Thutmose created the left eye, but that it was later destroyed.

=== CT scans ===
The bust was first CT scanned in 1992, with the scan producing cross sections of the bust every five millimetres (0.20 in). In 2006, Dietrich Wildung, director of Berlin's Egyptian Museum, while trying a different lighting at the Altes Museum, where the bust was then displayed, observed wrinkles on Nefertiti's neck and bags under her eyes, suggesting the sculptor had tried to depict signs of aging. A CT scan confirmed Wildung's findings; Thutmose had added gypsum under the cheeks and eyes in an attempt to perfect his sculpture.

The CT scan in 2006, led by Alexander Huppertz, director of the Imaging Science Institute in Berlin, revealed a wrinkled face of Nefertiti carved in the inner core of the bust. The results were published in the April 2009's Radiology. The scan revealed that Thutmose placed layers of varying thickness on top of the limestone core. The inner face has creases around her mouth and cheeks and a swelling on the nose. The creases and the bump on the nose are leveled by the outermost stucco layer. According to Huppertz, this may reflect "aesthetic ideals of the era". The 2006 scan provided greater detail than the 1992 one, revealing subtle details just 1–2 millimetres (0.04–0.08 in) under the stucco.

== Later history ==
The bust has become "one of the most admired, and most copied, images from ancient Egypt", and the star exhibit used to market Berlin's museums. It is seen as an "icon of international beauty." "Showing a woman with a long neck, elegantly arched brows, high cheekbones, a slender nose and an enigmatic smile played about red lips, the bust has established Nefertiti as one of the most beautiful faces of antiquity." It is described as the most famous bust of ancient art, comparable only to the mask of Tutankhamun.

Nefertiti has become an icon of Berlin's culture. Some 500,000 visitors see her every year. The bust is described as "the best-known work of art from ancient Egypt, arguably from all antiquity". Her face is on postcards of Berlin and 1989 German postage stamps.

=== Locations in Germany ===
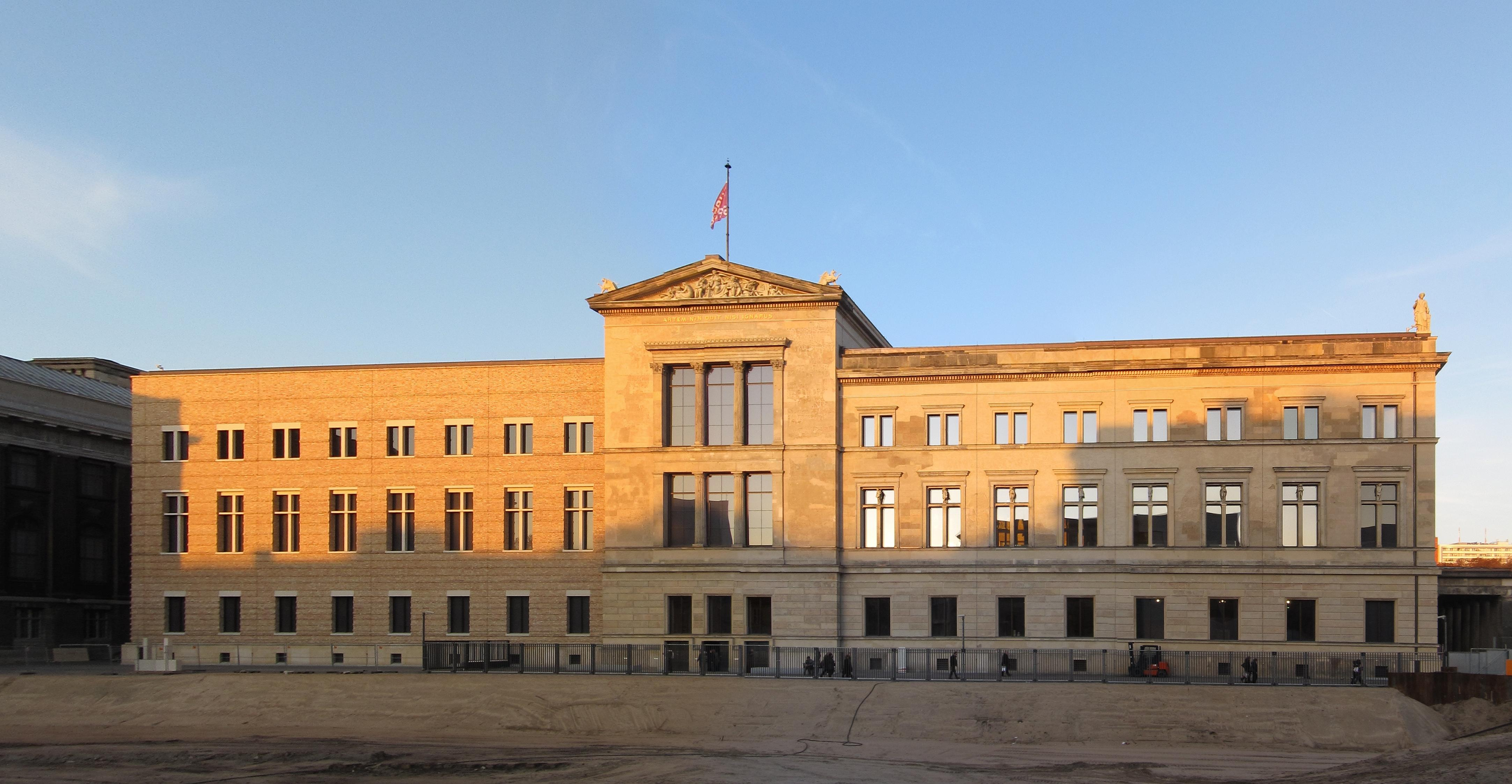
Neues Museum, Berlin is the present location of the Nefertiti bust

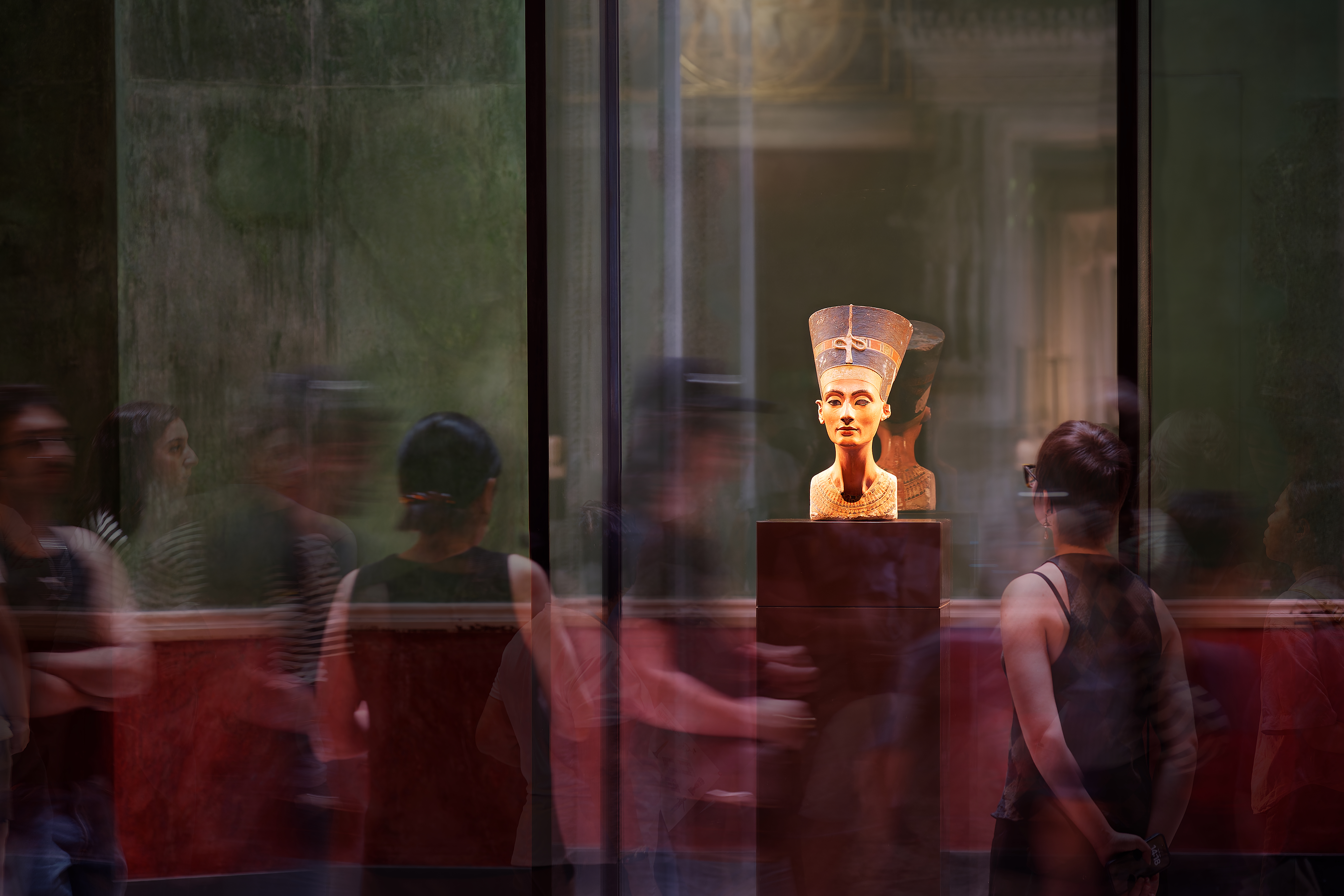
Nefertiti bust in the North Dome Room of the Neues Museum, at the climax of the recommended tour

The bust has been in Germany since 1913, when it was shipped to Berlin and presented to James Simon, a wholesale merchant and the sponsor of the Amarna excavation. It was displayed at Simon's residence until 1913, when Simon lent the bust and other artifacts from the Amarna dig to the Berlin Museum. Although the rest of the Amarna collection was displayed in 1913–14, the bust was kept secret at Borchardt's request. In 1918, the museum discussed the public display of the bust, but again kept it secret at the request of Borchardt. It was permanently donated to the museum in 1920. In 1923, the bust was revealed to the public in Borchardt's writings; in 1924, it was displayed to the public as part of the Egyptian Museum of Berlin. The bust created a sensation, swiftly becoming a world-renowned icon of feminine beauty and one of the most universally recognised artifacts to survive from Ancient Egypt. The bust was displayed in Berlin's Neues Museum on Museum Island until the museum was closed in 1939; with the onset of World War II, Berlin museums were emptied and artifacts moved to secure shelters for safekeeping. Initially stored in the cellar of the Prussian Governmental Bank, the bust was moved in the autumn of 1941 to Zoo Tower, a flak bunker in Berlin. The Neues Museum suffered bombings in 1943 by the Royal Air Force. On 6 March 1945, the bust was moved to a German salt mine at Merkers-Kieselbach in Thuringia.

In March 1945, the bust was found by the American Army and given over to its Monuments, Fine Arts and Archives branch. It was moved to the Reichsbank in Frankfurt and shipped in August to the U.S. Central Collecting Point in Wiesbaden, where it was put on public display beginning in 1946. It remained on display at the Museum Wiesbaden for ten years before being transferred in 1956 to West Berlin, where it was exhibited at the Dahlem Museum. As early as 1946, East Germany (German Democratic Republic) pressed for the return of the bust to Museum Island in East Berlin, where it had been displayed before the war. In 1967, the bust was moved to the Egyptian Museum in the Charlottenburg borough of Berlin and remained there until 2005, when it was moved to the Altes Museum. The bust returned to the Neues Museum as its centerpiece when the museum reopened in October 2009.

== Controversies ==
External videos
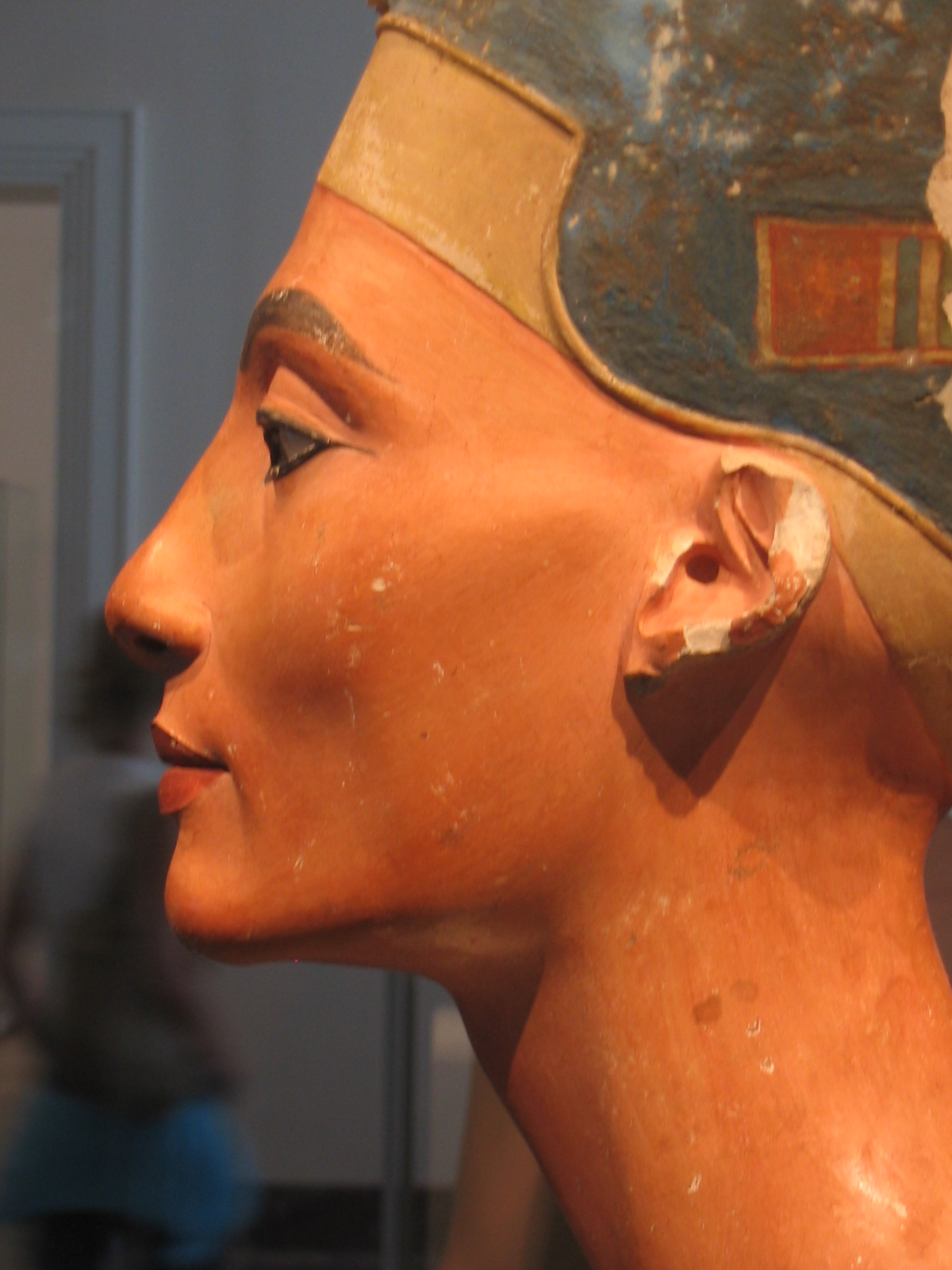
- Thutmose's Bust of Nefertiti (Amarna Period), Smarthistory

=== Requests for repatriation to Egypt ===
Since the official unveiling of the bust in Berlin in 1924, Egyptian authorities have demanded its return to Egypt. In 1925, Egypt threatened to ban German excavations in Egypt unless the bust was returned. In 1929, Egypt offered to exchange other artifacts for the bust, but Germany declined.

Although Germany had previously strongly opposed repatriation, in 1933 Hermann Göring considered returning the bust to King Fuad I of Egypt as a political gesture. Hitler opposed the idea and told the Egyptian government that he would build a new Egyptian museum for Nefertiti. "In the middle, this wonder, Nefertiti, will be enthroned," Hitler said. "I will never relinquish the head of the Queen." While the bust was under American control, Egypt requested the United States to hand it over; the US refused and advised Egypt to take up the matter with the new German authorities. In the 1950s, Egypt again tried to initiate negotiations, but there was no response from Germany. In 1989, Egyptian President Hosni Mubarak viewed the bust and announced that Nefertiti was "the best ambassador for Egypt" in Berlin.

Egyptian archaeologist, Egyptologist, and former Minister of State for Antiquities Affairs, Zahi Hawass believed that the bust belongs to Egypt and that it was taken out of Egypt illegally and should therefore be returned. He maintained the stance that Egyptian authorities were misled over the acquisition of the bust in 1913 and demanded that Germany prove that it was exported legally. According to Kurt G. Siehr, another argument in support of repatriation is that "Archeological finds have their 'home' in the country of origin and should be preserved in that country." The repatriation issue sprang up again in 2003 over the Body of Nefertiti sculpture. In 2005, Hawass requested that UNESCO intervene to return the bust.

In 2007, Hawass threatened to ban exhibitions of Egyptian artifacts in Germany, if the bust was not lent to Egypt, but to no avail. He also requested a worldwide boycott of loans to German museums to initiate what he called a "scientific war". Hawass wanted Germany to lend the bust to Egypt in 2012 for the opening of the new Grand Egyptian Museum near the Great Pyramids of Giza. Simultaneously, a campaign called "Nefertiti Travels" was launched by cultural association CulturCooperation, based in Hamburg, Germany. They distributed postcards depicting the bust with the words "Return to Sender" and wrote an open letter to German Culture Minister Bernd Neumann supporting the view that Egypt should be given the bust on loan. In 2009, when the bust was moved back to the Neues Museum, the appropriateness of Berlin as its location was questioned.

Several German art experts have attempted to refute all the claims made by Hawass, pointing to the 1924 document discussing the pact between Borchardt and French authorities in Egypt. German authorities have also argued the bust is too fragile to transport and that legal arguments for repatriation were insubstantial. According to The Times, Germany may be concerned that lending the bust to Egypt would mean its permanent departure from Germany.

In December 2009, Friederike Seyfried, director of Berlin's Egyptian Museum and Papyrus Collection, presented to the Egyptians documents held by the museum regarding the discovery of the bust, which include a protocol signed by the German excavator and the French-run Egyptian Antiquities Service. In the documents, the bust was listed as a painted plaster bust of a princess, but in his diary, Borchardt clearly referred to it as the head of Nefertiti. "This proves that Borchardt wrote this description so that his country can get the statue," Hawass said. "These materials confirm Egypt's contention that (he) did act unethically with intent to deceive." However, Hawass said Egypt did not consider the bust to be a looted antiquity. "I really want it back," he said. His statement also said that the authority to approve the return of the bust to Egypt lies with the Prussian Cultural Heritage Foundation and the German culture minister.

=== Allegations over authenticity ===
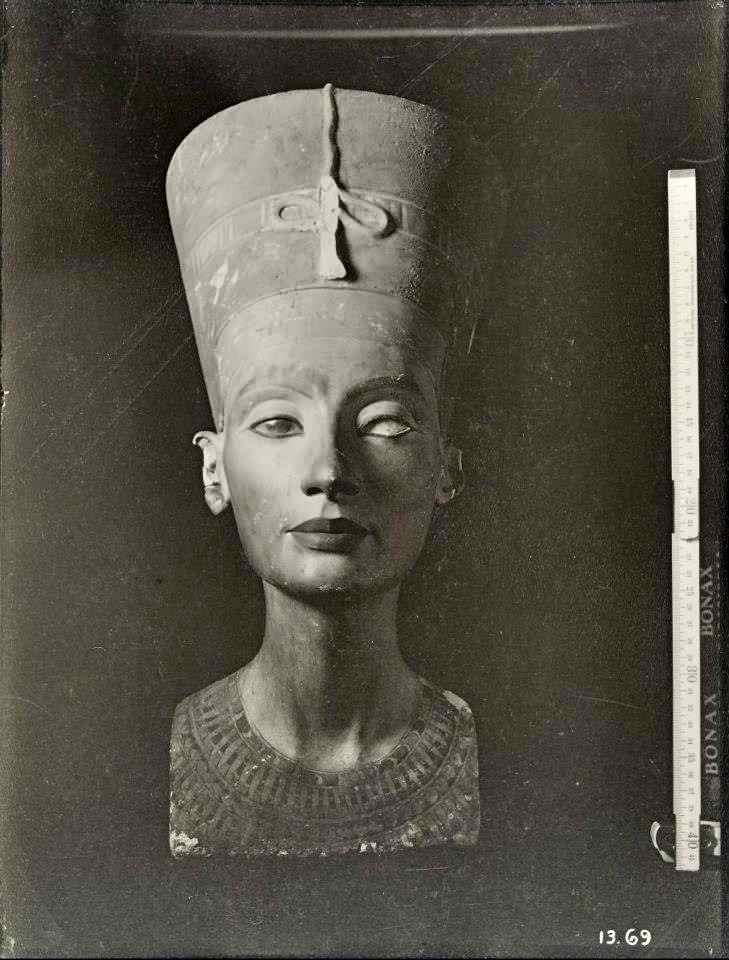
Photo of the Nefertiti Bust taken in 1912

The French language book Le Buste de Nefertiti – une Imposture de l'Egyptologie ? (The Bust of Nefertiti – a Fraud in Egyptology?) by Swiss art historian Henri Stierlin and the book Missing Link in Archaeology by Berlin author and historian Erdogan Ercivan both claimed that the bust was a modern fake. Stierlin claims that Borchardt may have created the bust to test ancient pigments and that when the bust was admired by Prince Johann Georg of Saxony, Borchardt pretended it was genuine to avoid offending the prince. Stierlin argues that the missing left eye of the bust would have been a sign of disrespect in ancient Egypt, that no scientific records of the bust appear until 1923, 11 years after its supposed discovery, and while the paint pigments are ancient, the inner limestone core has never been dated. French archaeologists present at the site as well never mentioned the finding and neither did written accounts of the digs. Stierlin remarked that the archaeologist "didn't even bother to supply a description, which is amazing for an exceptional work found intact". Ercivan suggests Borchardt's wife was the model for the bust and both authors argue that it was not revealed to the public until 1924 because it was a fake. Another theory suggested that the existing bust was crafted in the 1930s on Hitler's orders and that the original was lost in World War II.

Scientists who have studied the sculpture discovered that the pigments used on the bust have been matched to those used by ancient Egyptian artisans. The chemical analysis on the dyes and pigments was initially done by Friedrich Rathgen, presented in Borchardt's book Portrait of Queen Nofretete (1923). They matched the ones in the 18th dynasty paintings, and a later analysis by the Swiss Federal Institute of Technology confirmed the results in 1982. The bust also bears resemblance to other unfinished, but recognizable, busts of Queen Nefertiti.

A 2006 CT scan that discovered the "hidden face" of Nefertiti proved, according to Science News, that the bust was genuine.

In 2009, director of Berlin's Egyptian Museum, Dietrich Wildung, dismissed the claims of forgery. He stated they were a publicity stunt, adding that radiological tests, detailed CT computer tomography and material analysis support its authenticity.

Egyptian authorities also dismissed Stierlin's theory, with Hawass remarking that "Stierlin is not a historian. He is delirious." Although Stierlin had argued "Egyptians cut shoulders horizontally" and Nefertiti had vertical shoulders, Hawass said that the new style seen in the bust is part of the changes introduced by Akhenaten, the husband of Nefertiti. Hawass also claimed that Thutmose had created the eye, but it was later destroyed.

=== Body of Nefertiti ===
In 2003, the Egyptian Museum in Berlin allowed the Hungarian artist duo Little Warsaw, András Gálik and Bálint Havas, to place the bust atop a nearly nude female bronze for a video installation to be shown at the Venice Biennale modern art festival. The artists said the project, called Body of Nefertiti, was an attempt to pay homage to the bust. According to Wildung, it showed "the continued relevance of the ancient world to today's art." Egyptian cultural officials proclaimed it to be a disgrace to "one of the great symbols of their country's history" and banned Wildung and his wife from further exploration in Egypt. The Egyptian Minister for Culture, Farouk Hosny, declared that Nefertiti was "not in safe hands" and although Egypt had not renewed their claims for restitution "due to the good relations with Germany," this "recent behaviour" was unacceptable.

=== 3D scan of the Bust ===
In 2016 a freedom of information request was made to the Egyptian Museum for access to a full colour scan of the bust that had been made by the museum 10 years prior. The museum declined the request citing impact on gift shop revenue. Eventually the Prussian Cultural Heritage Foundation which oversees the museum released the file, which is now available (not directly from the museum), however controversially attached a copyright to the work, which is in the public domain.

=== The Nefertiti bust and the Ceiling of King Ramses IV's tomb ===
In 2023, images circulating on social media showed the ceiling of King Ramses IV's tomb as resembling the back of the bust of Nefertiti statue. These images are altered and do not represent the actual ceiling of any king tombs by patterns or designs as suggested by the fake images.

== Cultural significance ==
In 1930, the German press described the bust as their new monarch, personifying it as a queen. As the "'most precious ... stone in the setting of the diadem' from the art treasures of 'Prussia Germany'", Nefertiti would re-establish the imperial German national identity after 1918. Hitler described the bust as "a unique masterpiece, an ornament, a true treasure", and pledged to build a museum to house it. By the 1970s, the bust had become an issue of national identity to both German states, East Germany and West Germany, created after World War II. In 1999, the bust appeared on an election poster for the green political party Bündnis 90/Die Grünen as a promise for a cosmopolitan and multi-cultural environment with the slogan "Strong Women for Berlin!" According to Claudia Breger, another reason that the bust became associated with German national identity was its place as a rival to Tutankhamun, found by the British who then effectively controlled Egypt.

The bust became an influence on popular culture, with Jack Pierce's make-up work on Elsa Lanchester's hairstyle in the film Bride of Frankenstein being inspired by it.
