= Henri Stierlin =

Swiss journalist and writer (1928–2022)

Henri Stierlin (2 April 1928 – 10 September 2022) was a Swiss journalist and writer of popular works on art and architectural history.

== Education ==
Stierlin was born in Alexandria, Egypt. He studied Classics with Law at the Universities of Lausanne and Zurich. He achieved Bachelor of Arts (Law) whilst at Lausanne in 1954. He also studied Theory of Art History, at Grenoble University in 1977–1978, writing a dissertation on the Symbolic Nature of the Persian Mosque.

== Journalistic career ==
Stierlin was a columnist in art-history, and editor at the Swiss newspaper Tribune de Geneve from 1955 to 1962, and a radio journalist at Radio Suisse in 1957 (cultural programs.) An editor for Rizzoli. In 1963 he became general editor of the Swiss magazine Radio-TV and architectural editor of the journal Werk-Œuvre in 1972. He was made a Knight of the Legion of Honour in 2004.

In his 2009 book Le buste de Néfertiti : Une imposture de l'égyptologie? (The Bust of Nefertiti – an Egyptology Fraud?) he argued that the famous Nefertiti bust in Berlin is a fake.

== Books and publications ==
- Living architecture: ancient Mexican (1968) 192 pages
- Encyclopaedia of world architecture volume 2 (1978) 499 pages
- The pre-Colombian [sic] civilizations: the world of the Maya, Aztecs, and Incas (1979) 95 pages
- Art of the Maya : from the Olmecs to the Toltec-Maya (1981) 211 pages
- Art of the Aztecs (1982) 36 pages
- The cultural history of pre-Columbian America (1984)
- Art of the Incas and its origins (1984) 240 pages
- Ma'yan (1994) 192 pages
- Angkor and Khmer art (1997) 96 pages
- The art of Islam in the East, from Isfahan to the Taj Mahal, Grund, Paris, 2002.
- L'architecture de l'Islam : Au service de la foi et du pouvoir, coll. « Découvertes Gallimard » (nº 443), série Arts. Paris: Gallimard, 2003 Deus ex Machina, Infolio, Gollion, 2004
- The Roman Empire: from the Etruscans to the decline of the Roman Empire (2004) 240 pages
- The art of Mediterranean Islam, from Damascus to Cordoba, Grund, Paris, 2005
- The photographic vision of architecture: An itinerary in the image, Infolio, Gollion, 2005. 128p. Splendors of the Persian Empire, Grund, Paris, 2006.
- The Gold of the Pharaohs (2007) 235 pages
- The Pharaohs master builders (2008) 255 pages
- Greece : from Mycenae to the Parthenon (2009) 224 pages
- Le buste de Néfertiti : Une imposture de l'égyptologie?, Infolio, Gollion, 2009
- Teotihuacán : La cité des Dieux, coll. « Découvertes Gallimard Hors série », 2009
- Rituals and mysteries of the deified kings (2010) 224 pages

=== with Anne Stierlin ===
- Splendour of an Islam World (1997) 219 pages
- Hindu India: from Khajuraho to the temple city of Madurai (1998) 237 pages
- Turkey: from the Selçuks to the Ottomans (1998) 237 pages
- Islamic art and architecture (2002) 319 pages

=== Joint ===
- Pedro Ramirez Vasquez - Living architecture: Mayan (1964) 192 pages
- Hiroshi Daifuku, Philipe Stern, Ta-kuan Chou, Madeleine Giteau, Son Soubert, Luc Ionesco - S.O.S. Angkor (1971) 42 pages
- Karl Gerstner - The Spirit of colors: the art of Karl Gerstner : nine picture chapters and selected essays (1981) 225 pages
- Octavio Autpaz; Iris Barry; Daniele Lavallee; Jean Paul Barbier; Conceicao, G. Correa (2000) - Pre-Columbian America: Ritual Arts of the New World Henri Stierlin;

== See also ==
- Persepolis
- Achaemenid
- Islamic Art
- Sassanid architecture
