= Ludwig Borchardt =

German Egyptologist (1863–1938)

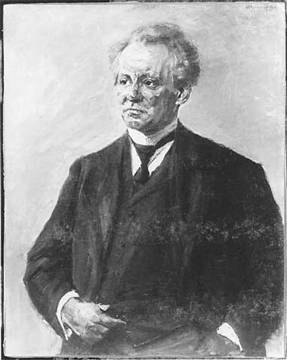
- Born: 5 October 1863; Berlin, Prussia
- Died: 12 August 1938 (aged 74); Paris, France

Ludwig Borchardt (5 October 1863 – 12 August 1938) was a German Egyptologist. He is best known for finding a famous bust of Nefertiti at Amarna.

== Life ==
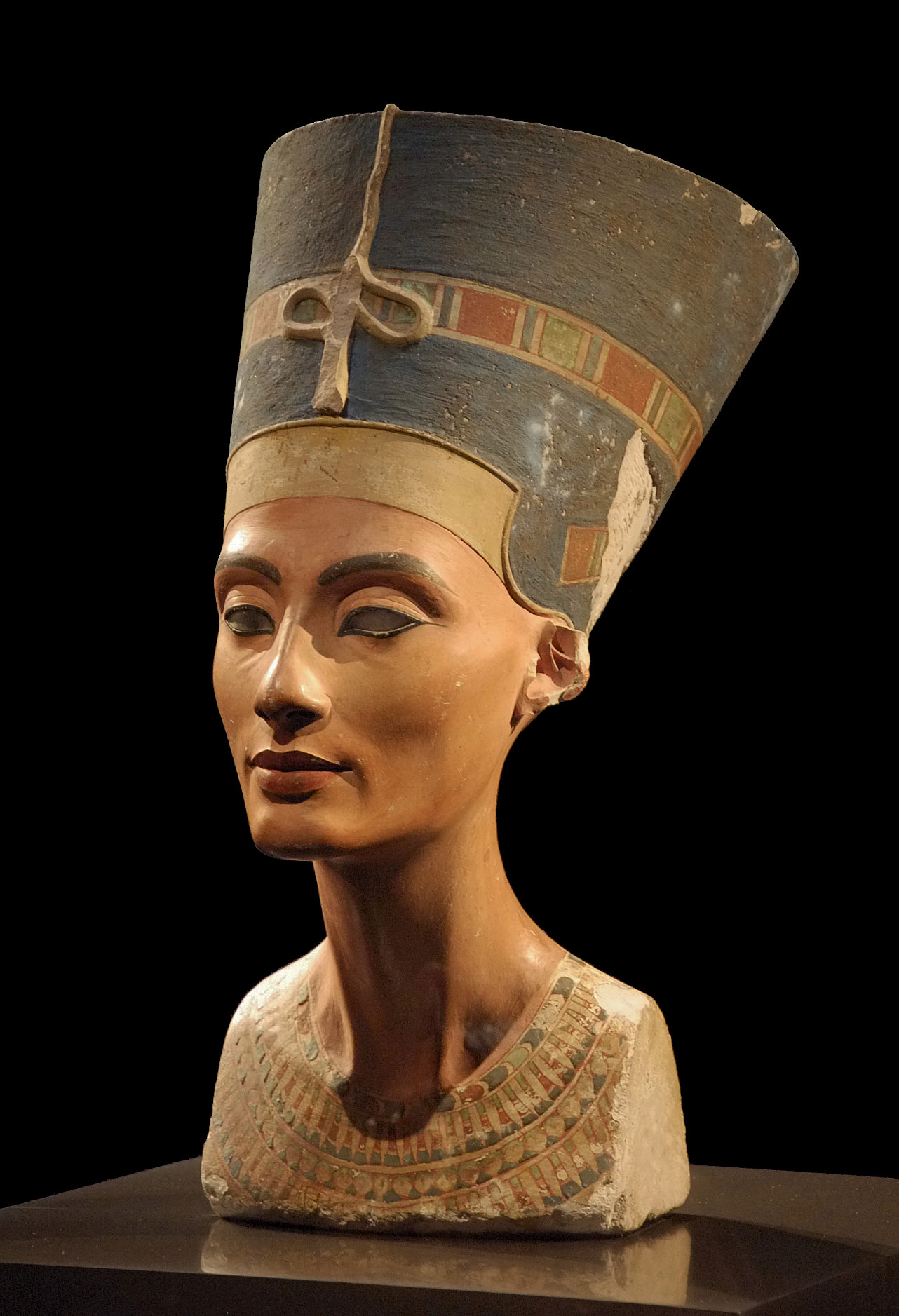
The Nefertiti Bust is the best known find of Ludwig Borchardt

Born in Berlin in 1863 into a well-established Jewish family, Borchardt was the second-oldest of six children of the merchant Hermann Borchardt (1830–1890) and Bertha, née Levin (1835–1910). Also known as Herbert, Borchardt initially studied Architecture and later Egyptology under Adolf Erman. In 1895, he journeyed to Cairo and produced, with Gaston Maspero, the Catalogue of the Egyptian Museum (Catalogue Général du Musée du Caire).

His main focus was Ancient Egyptian architecture. He began excavations in Amarna, where he discovered the workshop of the sculptor Thutmose. Amongst its contents was the famous bust of Nefertiti (now in the Neues Museum in Berlin). From 1902 until 1908, he undertook extensive excavations of the Pyramid of Sahure, exploring the entire mortuary complex. He published his discoveries in a two-volume study Das Grabdenkmal des Konigs Sahure, "The Funerary Monument of the King Sahure", which is still considered the standard work on Sahure's complex.

Borchardt married Emilie (Mimi) Cohen, one of the daughters of Eduard Cohen and Ida Kuhn. In 1903, Mimi received an inheritance from her grandfather Abraham Kuhn of 150,000 Marks, a considerable fortune equal to 53.7 kilograms of gold, and spent most of it on buying a villa in Cairo.

In 1907, Borchardt founded the German Archaeological Institute (Deutsches Archäologische Institut) in Cairo, and remained its director until 1928. While based in Cairo, he also directed the excavations in Heliopolis and the noble tombs of the Old Kingdom in Abu Gorab. He was also a member of the Egyptology Committee that was in charge of the antiquities administration service in Egypt.

He was forced to resign from all his archaeological positions when the Nazi Party came to power in 1933. Borchardt then went into self-imposed exile in Paris, where he died on 12 August 1938. His brother Georg Hermann, a well-regarded writer, was murdered by the Nazis in Auschwitz on 19 November 1943.

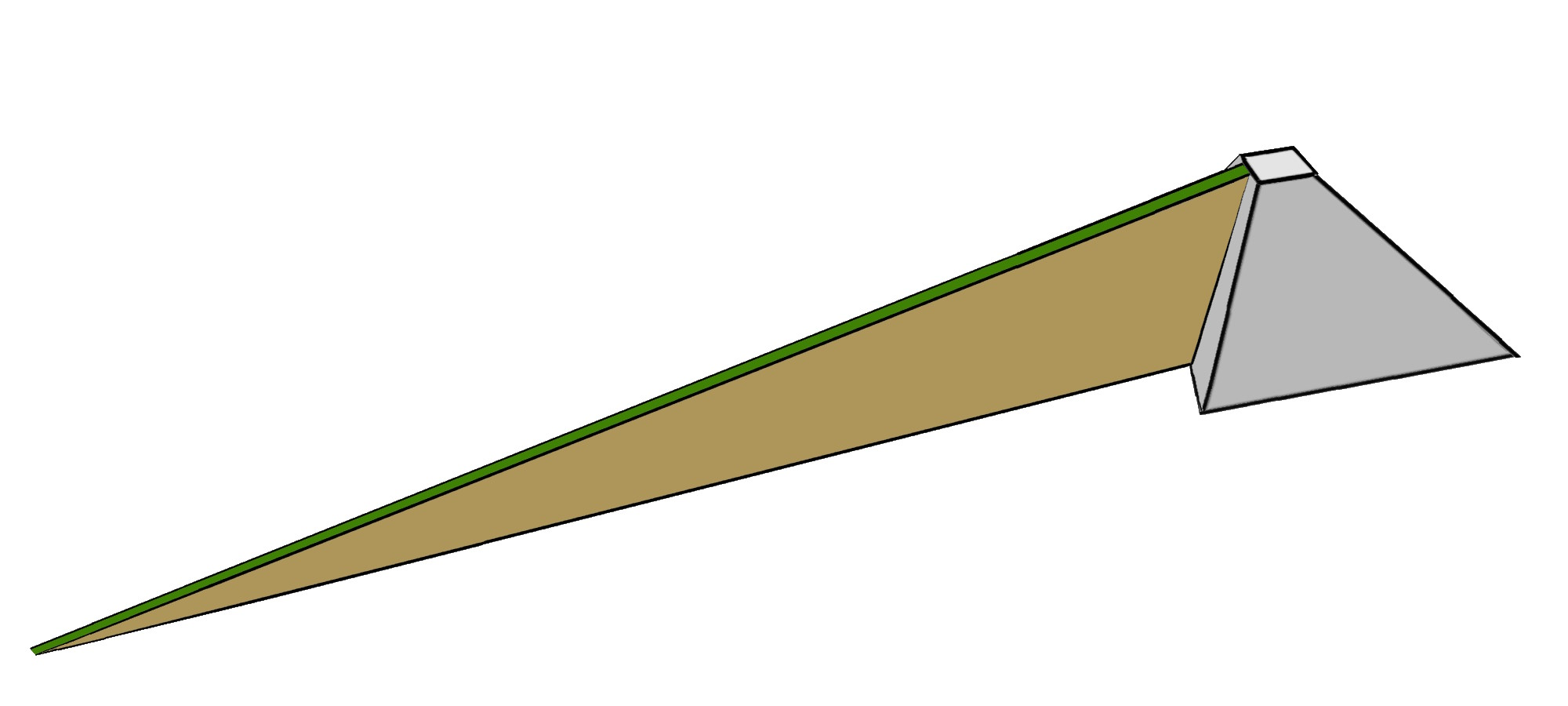
Ramp model by Ludwig Borchardt

Recently, controversy has arisen with the assertion that Borchardt smuggled the bust of Nefertiti out of Egypt by reporting it as an artifact made of gypsum. However, the Swiss art historian Henri Stierlin has claimed that the bust is a copy dating from 1912.

In 1928, he published a proposal for the construction of the Great Pyramid. It uses an outside straight ramp that runs vertically towards the pyramid and grows with the height of the pyramid.

== Publications ==
- Baugeschichte des Amontempels von Karnak (1905)
- Die Annalen und die zeitliche Festlegung des Alten Reiches der ägyptischen Geschichte (1917)
- Quellen und Forschungen zur Zeitbestimmung der Ägyptischen Geschichte, 3 volumes (1917–1938)

== See also ==
- List of Egyptologists
