= Little Warsaw =

Little Warsaw is the collective name for artists András Gálik (born 1970) and Bálint Havas (born 1971). They were both born and grew up in Budapest through the 1970s and 1980s. After they finished their academic training of visual arts in the mid-1990s they set up the Little Warsaw initiative as a self-developed umbrella unit for their collaborative activities.

Little Warsaw have exhibited at the Venice Biennial, the Berlin Biennial, Stedelijk Museum, GFZK, ApexArt Gallery, and Manifesta. Their work is featured in Art After Conceptual Art published by MIT Press.
