= Thutmose (sculptor) =

Ancient Egyptian sculptor

- Years active: c. 1345 BC
- Notable work: Nefertiti Bust

Thutmose, also known as "The King's Favourite and Master of Works, the Sculptor Thutmose" (also spelled Djhutmose, Thutmosis, and Thutmes; fl. c. 1345 BC) was an Ancient Egyptian sculptor in the Amarna style. He is thought to have been the official court sculptor of the Egyptian pharaoh Amenhotep IV in the latter part of his reign. A German archaeological expedition digging in Amenhotep IV's deserted city of Akhetaten, known today as Amarna, found a ruined house and studio complex (labeled P47.1-3) in early December 1912; the building was identified as that of Thutmose based on an ivory horse blinker found in a rubbish pit in the courtyard inscribed with his name and job title. Since it gave his occupation as "sculptor" and the building was clearly a sculpture workshop, the determination seemed logical and has proven to be accurate.

== Recovered works ==
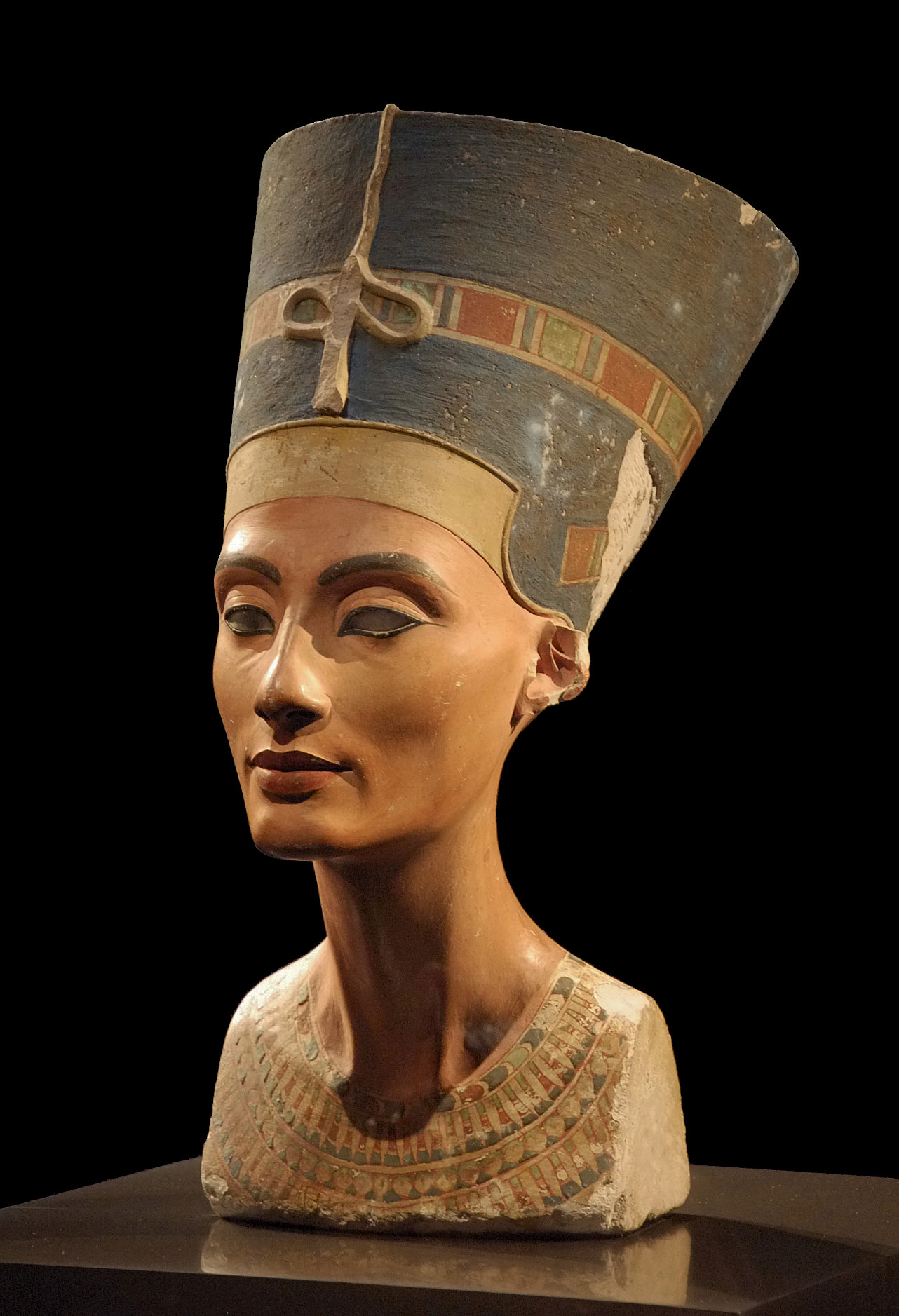
The Nefertiti Bust by Thutmose on display at the Neues Museum

Among many other sculptural items recovered at the same time was the polychrome Nefertiti Bust, apparently a master study for others to copy, which was found on the floor of a storeroom. In addition to this now-famous bust, twenty-two plaster casts of faces—some of which are full heads, others just the face—were found in Rooms 18 and 19 of the studio, with an additional one found in Room 14. Eight of these have been identified as various members of the royal family, including Amenhotep IV, his other wife Kiya, his late father Amenhotep III, and his eventual successor Ay. The rest represent unknown individuals, presumably contemporary residents of Amarna.

A couple of the pieces found in the workshop depict realistic images of older noblewomen, something rare in Ancient Egyptian art, which more often portrayed women in an idealized manner as always young, slender, and beautiful. One of the plaster faces depicts an older woman, with wrinkles at the corner of her eyes, bags under them, and a deeply lined forehead. This piece has been described as showing "a greater variety of wrinkles than any other depiction of an elite woman from ancient Egypt" It is thought to represent the image of a wise, older woman. A small statue of an aging Nefertiti also was found in the workshop, depicting her with a rounded, drooping belly, thick thighs, and a curved line at the base of her abdomen showing that she had borne several children, perhaps intended to project an image of fertility.

Examples of his work recovered from his abandoned studio may be viewed at the Egyptian Museum of Berlin, the Egyptian Museum in Cairo, and the Metropolitan Museum of Art in New York City. Upon the death of Amenhotep IV, the seat of government was returned from Amarna to Thebes and the associated bureaucratic and professional industries followed.

== Tomb ==
In 1996, the French Egyptologist Alain Zivie discovered at Saqqara the decorated rock cut tomb of the "head of the painters in the place of truth", Thutmose. The tomb dates to the time shortly after the Amarna Period. Although the title of the Thutmose in Saqqara is slightly different from the title of the Thutmose known from Amarna, it seems likely that they refer to the same person and that the different titles represent different stages in his career.

An extensive article by Zivie in the July–August 2018 edition of Biblical Archaeology Review provides great detail and many images of artifacts recovered in an adjacent tomb, discussion of many aspects of several topics regarding Ancient Egyptian research and identification, as well as information about the sculptor, Thutmose.

== Gallery of images ==
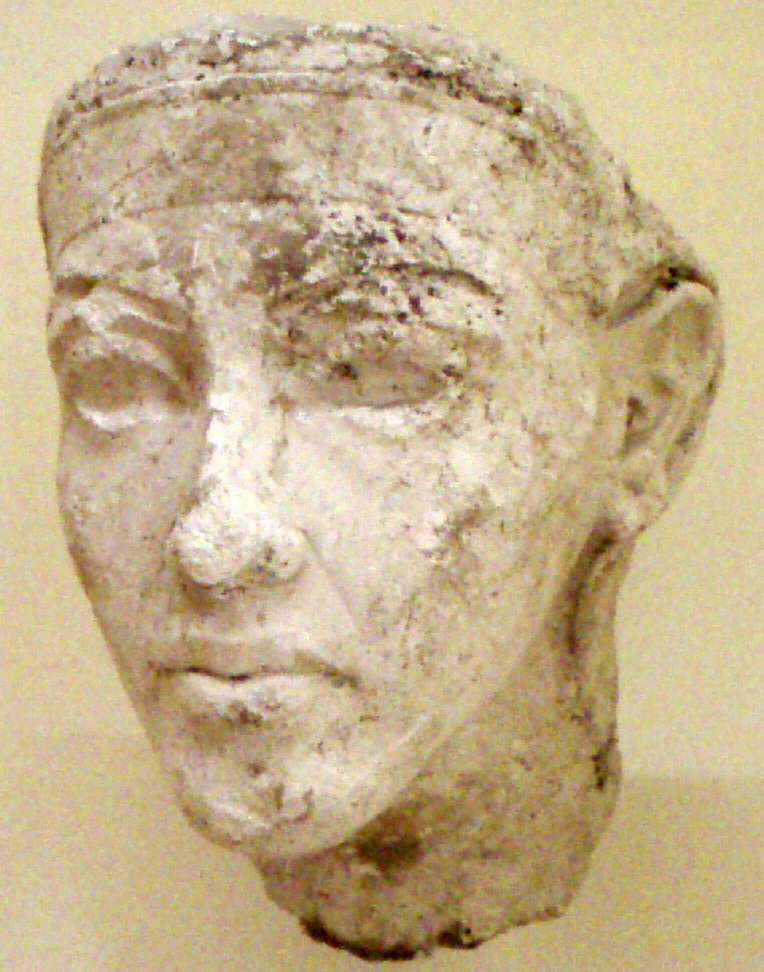
A plaster portrait of Amenhotep IV (or possibly his successor Smenkhkare) from the workshop of the sculptor Thutmose, on display at the Egyptian Museum of Berlin

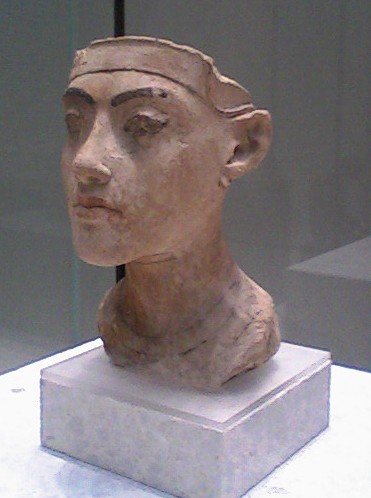
A plaster portrait of Tutankhamun, Amenhotep IV's successor, from the workshop of the sculptor Thutmose, on display at the Altes Museum

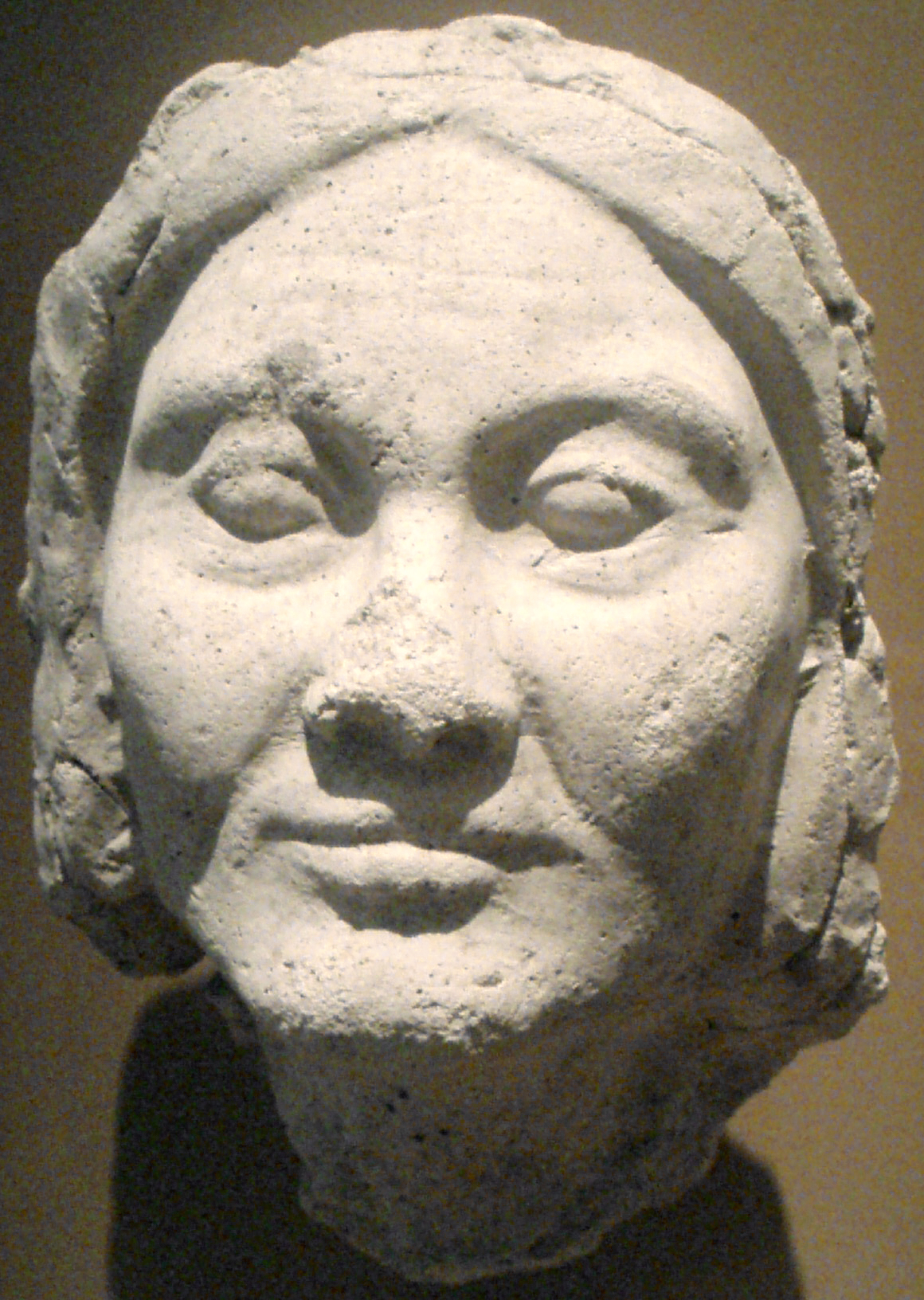
Plaster face of an older Amarna-era woman, from late in Amenhotep IV's reign, years 14–17, from the workshop of the sculptor Thutmose, on display at the Ägyptisches Museum

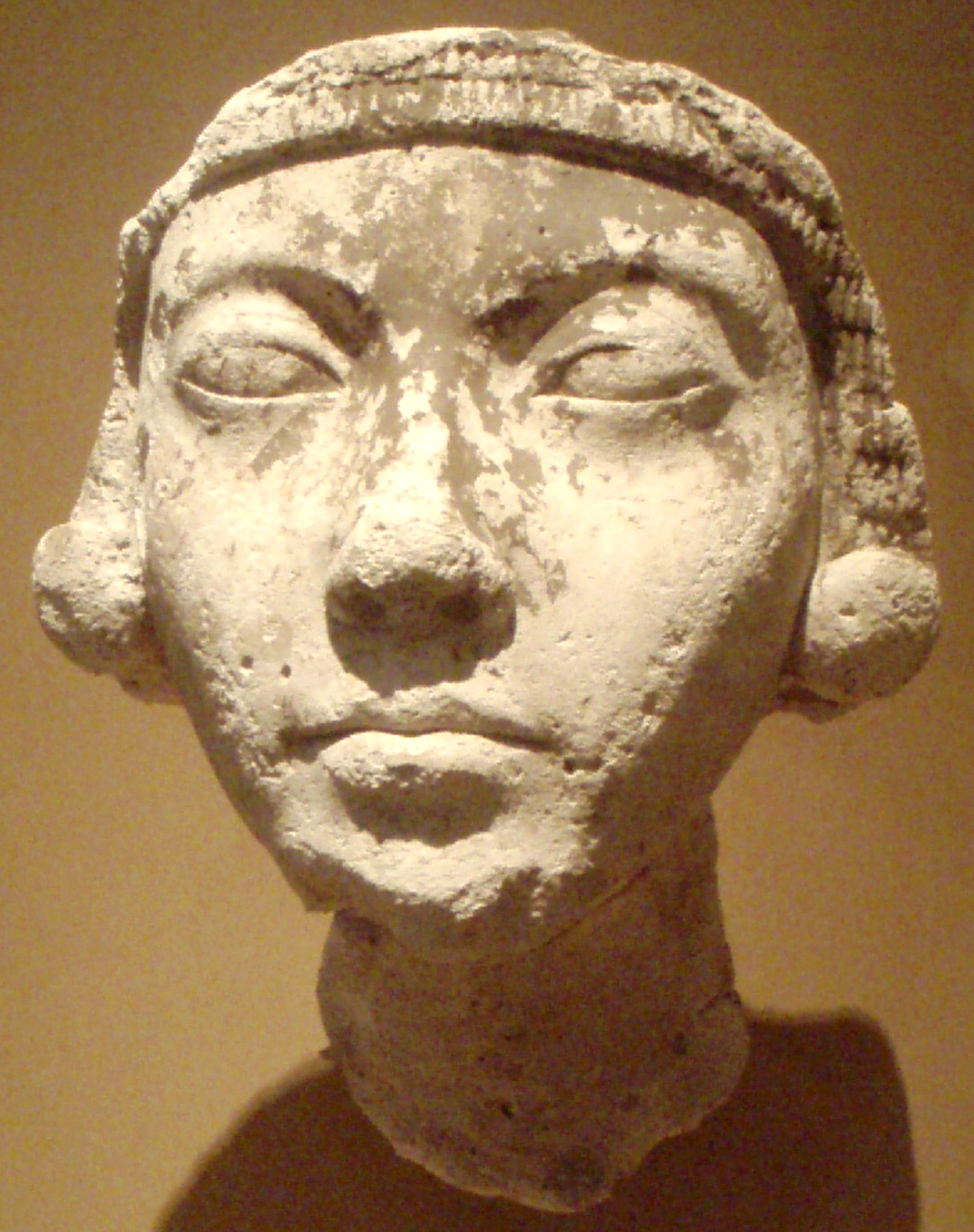
Plaster face of a young Amarna-era woman, (thought by many to represent Kiya, one of Amenhotep IV's wives), from late in Amenhotep IV's reign, years 14–17, from the workshop of the sculptor Thutmose, on display at the Metropolitan Museum of Art

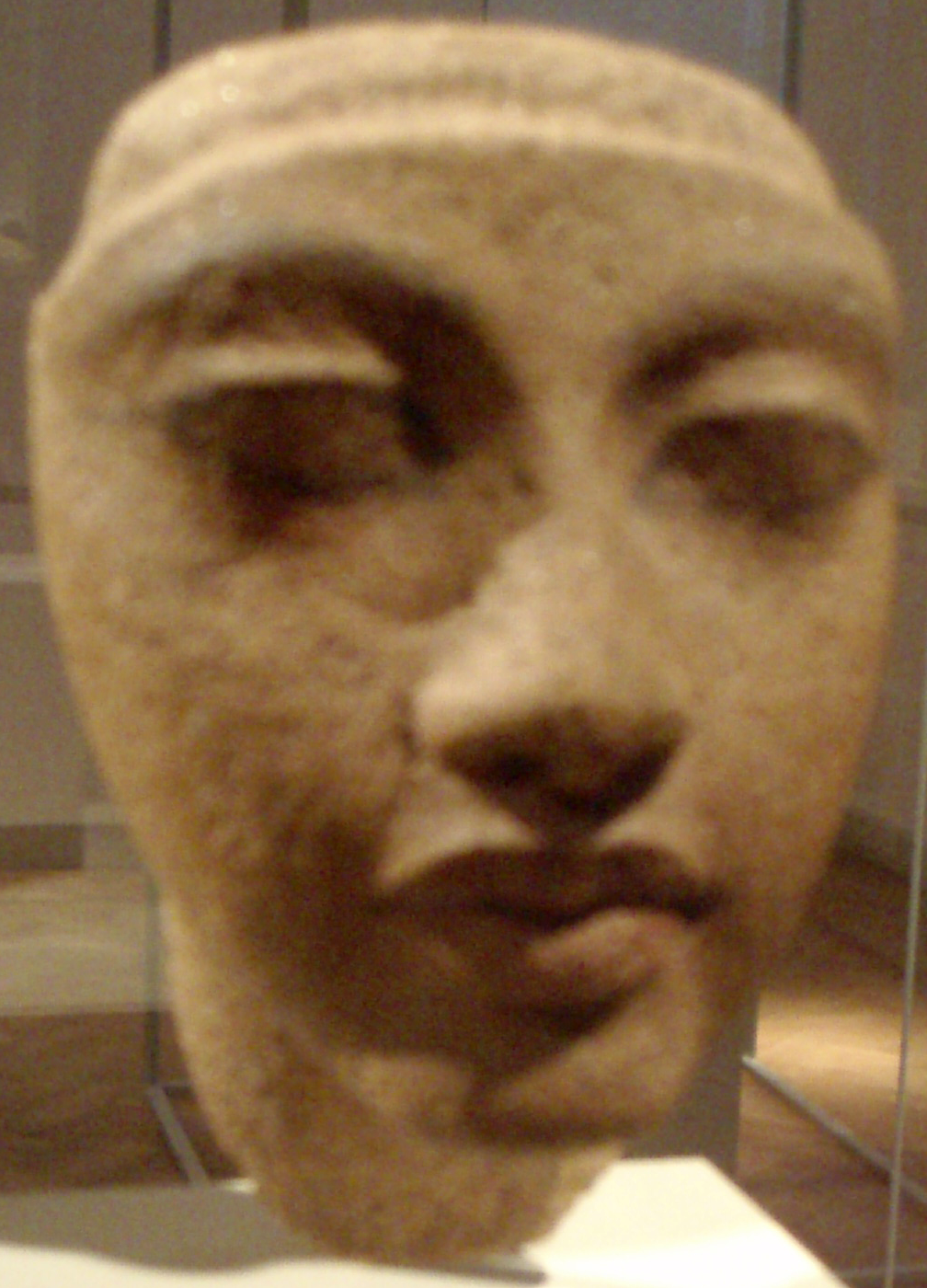
Portrait study thought to represent Kiya, a secondary wife to the pharaoh Amenhotep IV, discovered within the workshop of the royal sculptor Thutmose at Amarna, now part of the Egyptian Museum of Berlin collection

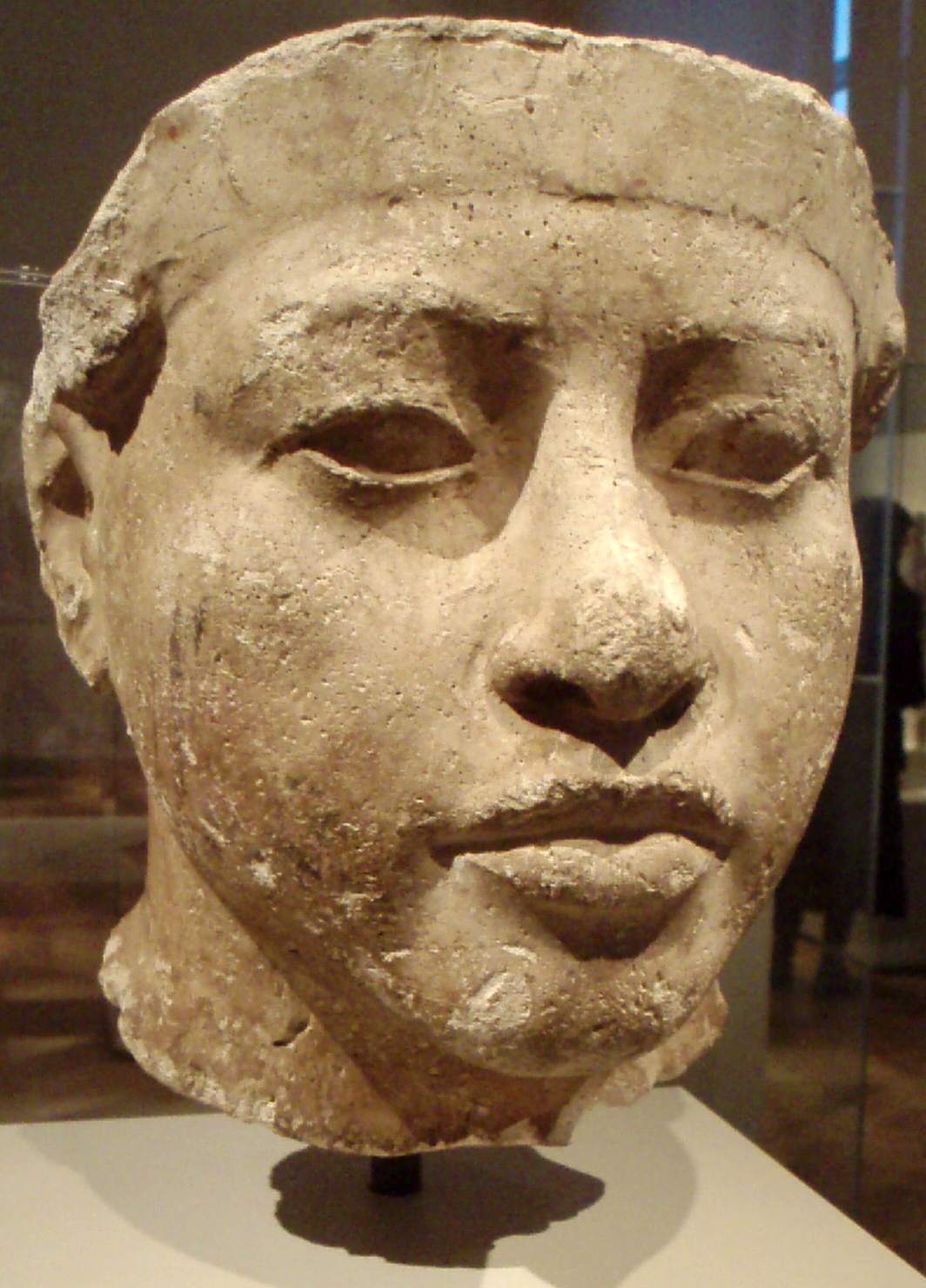
Portrait study thought to represent Amenhotep III, the father of pharaoh Amenhotep IV, discovered within the workshop of the royal sculptor Thutmose at Amarna, now part of the Egyptian Museum of Berlin collection

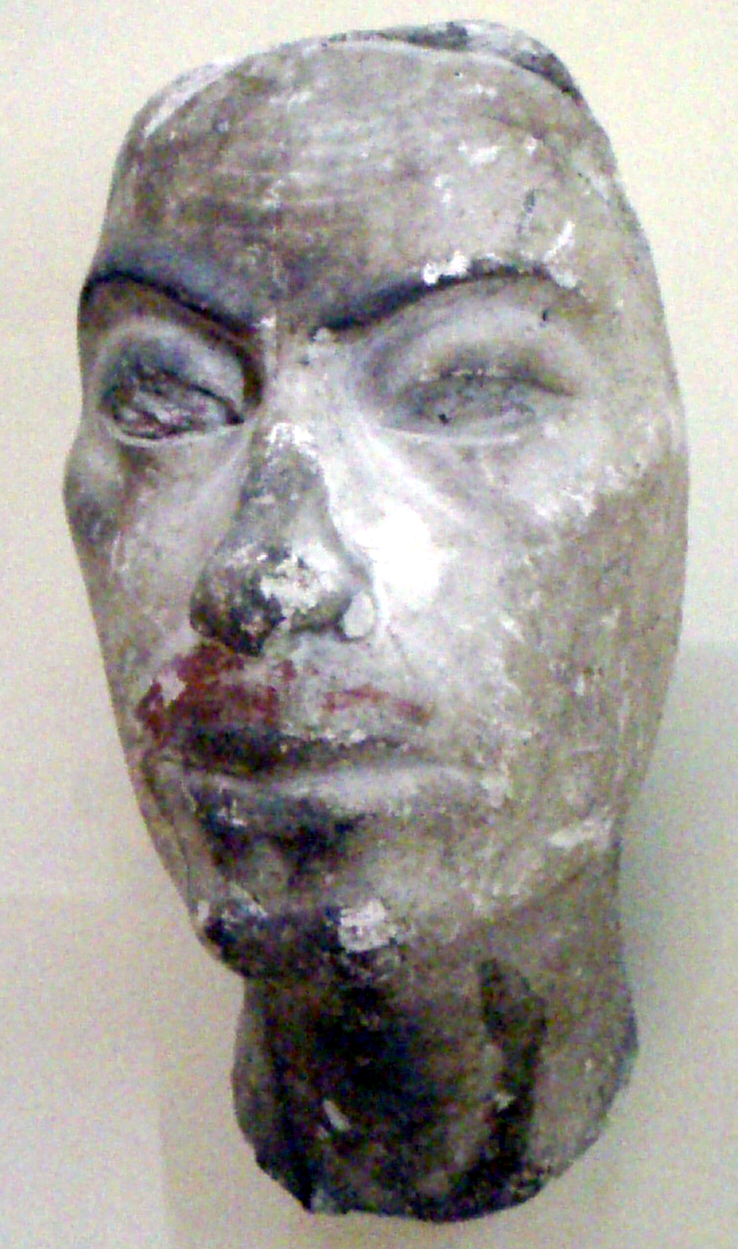
Plaster portrait study thought to represent the later successor pharaoh Ay, part of the Egyptian Museum of Berlin collection

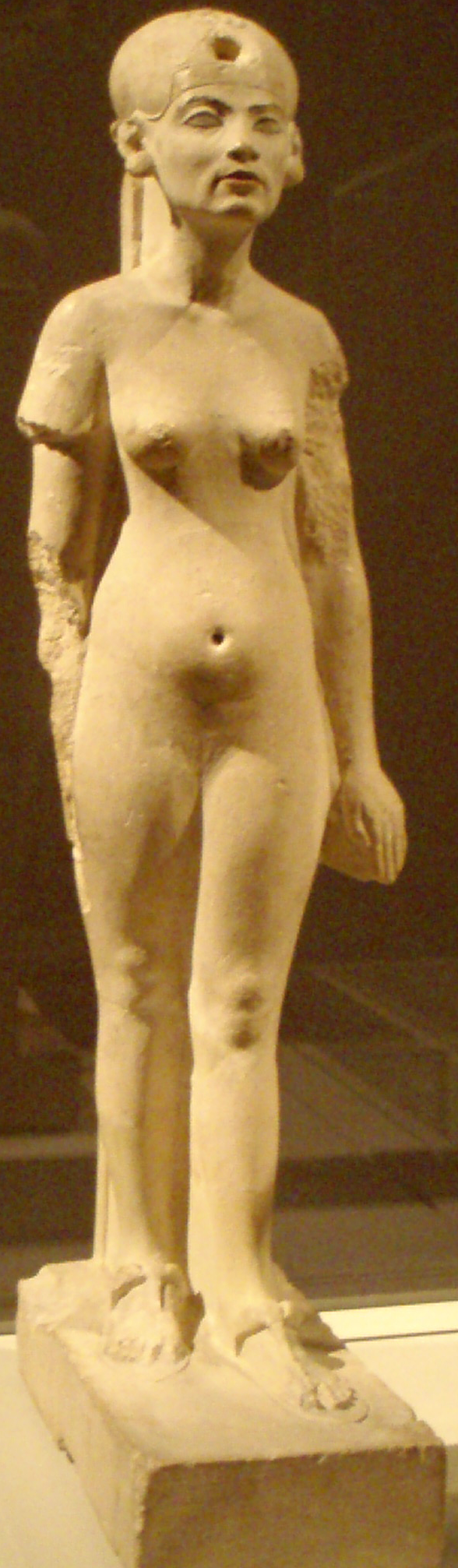
Statuette of Queen Nefertiti rendered in limestone from the workshop of the sculptor Thutmose, on display at the Egyptian Museum of Berlin.

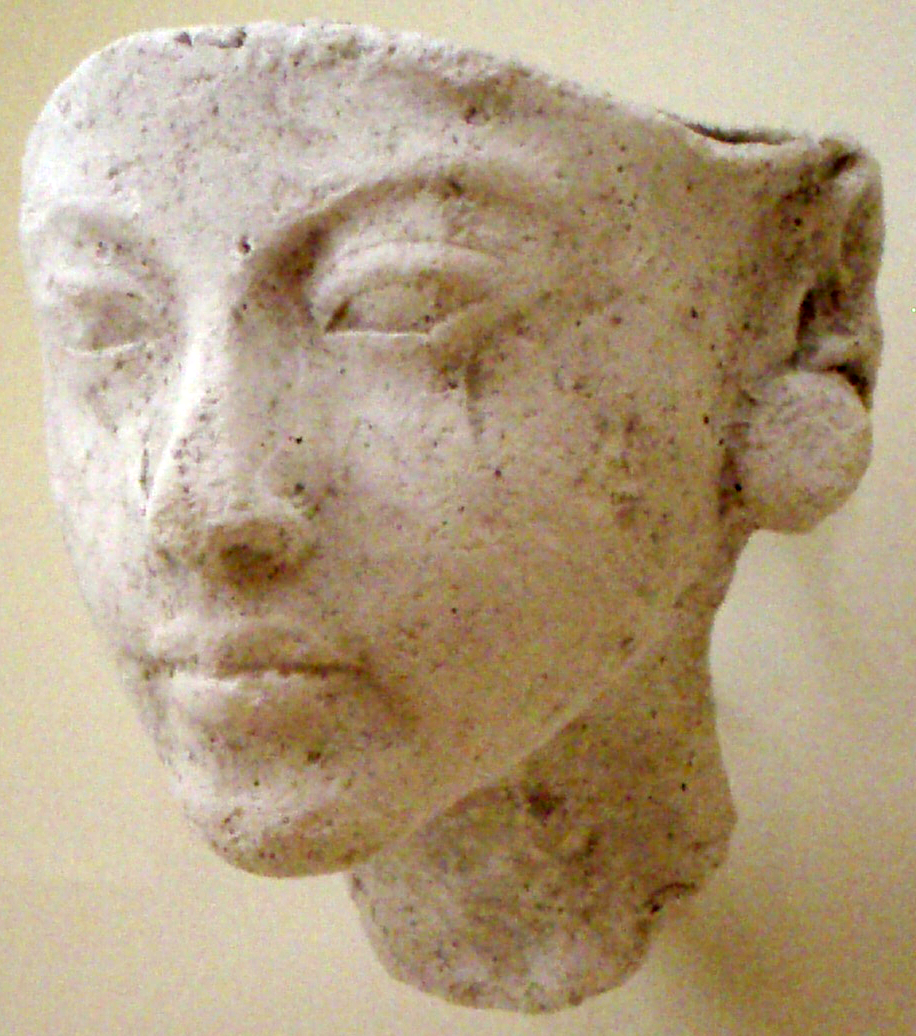
Plaster portrait study thought to represent Queen Nefertiti, primary wife of the pharaoh Amenhotep IV, discovered within the workshop of the royal sculptor Thutmose at Amarna, now part of the Egyptian Museum of Berlin

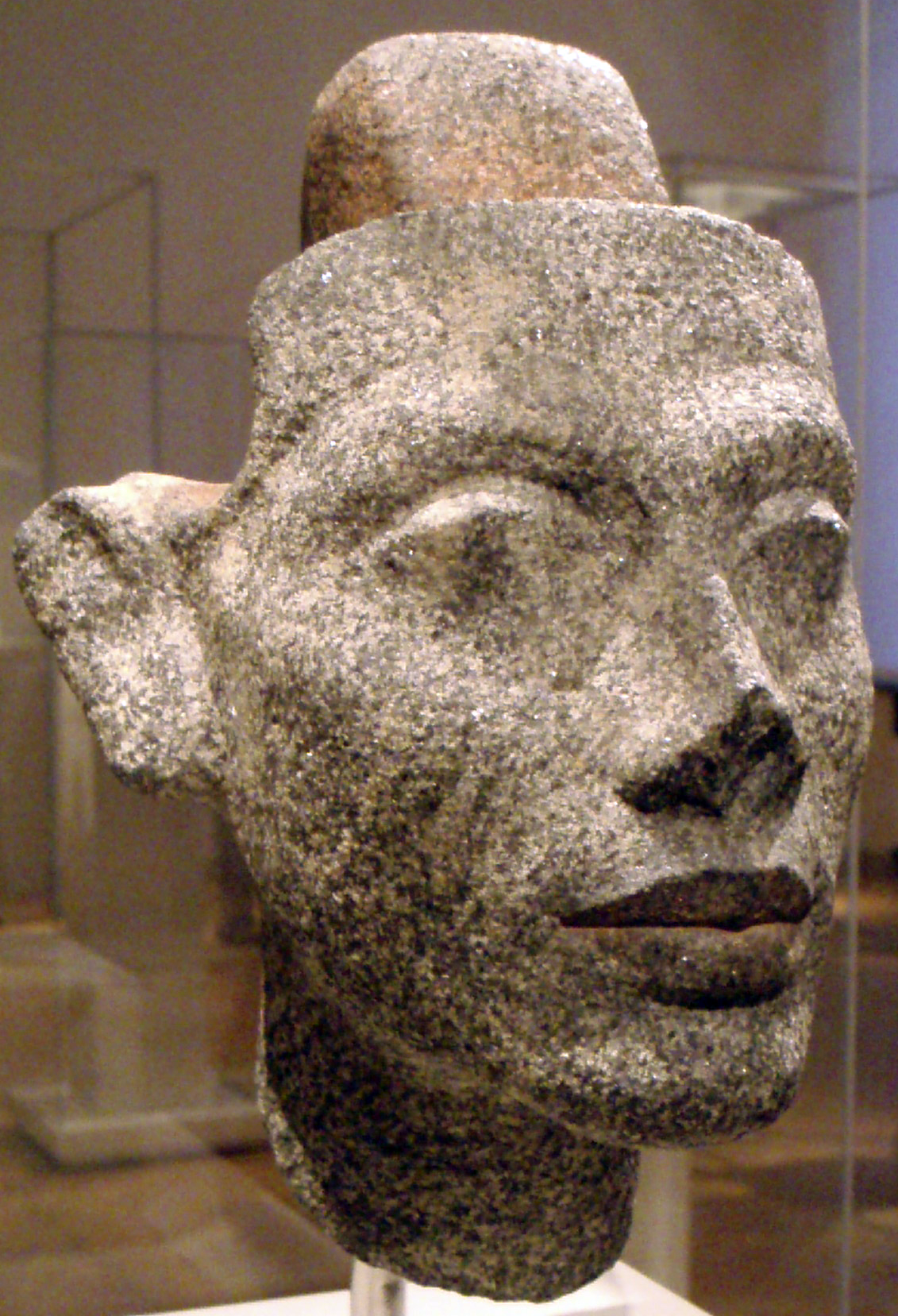
Granite statue of the head of Queen Nefertiti, from the workshop of the sculptor Thutmose, on display at the Egyptian Museum of Berlin

== Footnotes ==
=== Bibliography ===
- Aldred, Cyril (1988). Akhenaten: King of Egypt. Thames and Hudson. pp. 59.
- Dodson, Aidan (2009). Amarna Sunset: Nefertiti, Tutankhamun, Ay, Horemheb, and the Egyptian Counter-Reformation. The American University in Cairo Press. ISBN 978-977-416-304-3.
- Rita E. Freed, Yvonne J. Markowitz, Sue H. D'Auria, Pharaohs of the Sun: Akhenaten - Nefertiti - Tutankhamen (Museum of Fine Arts, 1999), pp. 123–126.
- Krauss, Rolf (2008). "Why Nefertiti Went to Berlin". Kmt. 19 (3): 44–53.
- Nicholas Reeves (2005). "Akhenaten: Egypt's False Prophet"
- Tyldesley, Joyce (2006). Chronicle of the Queens of Egypt. Thames & Hudson. ISBN 0-500-05145-3.
- Sweeney, Deborah (2004). "Forever Young? The Representation of Older and Ageing Women in Ancient Egyptian Art". Journal of the American Research Center in Egypt. 41. American Research Center in Egypt: 67–84. doi:10.2307/20297188. JSTOR 20297188.
- Ägyptisches Museum und Papyrussammlung Berlin, Friederike Seyfried (Hrsg.): Im Licht von Amarna: 100 Jahre Fund der Nofretete; [Katalog zur Ausstellung vom 07. Dezember 2012-13. April 2013: 100 Jahre Fund der Nofretete]. Imhof, Petersberg 2012, Seite 170 ff. Friederike Seyfried. Der Werkstattkomplex des Thutmosis.
