= Papyrus Bingen 45 =

1st-century BC manuscript

- Berlin Papyrus Collection
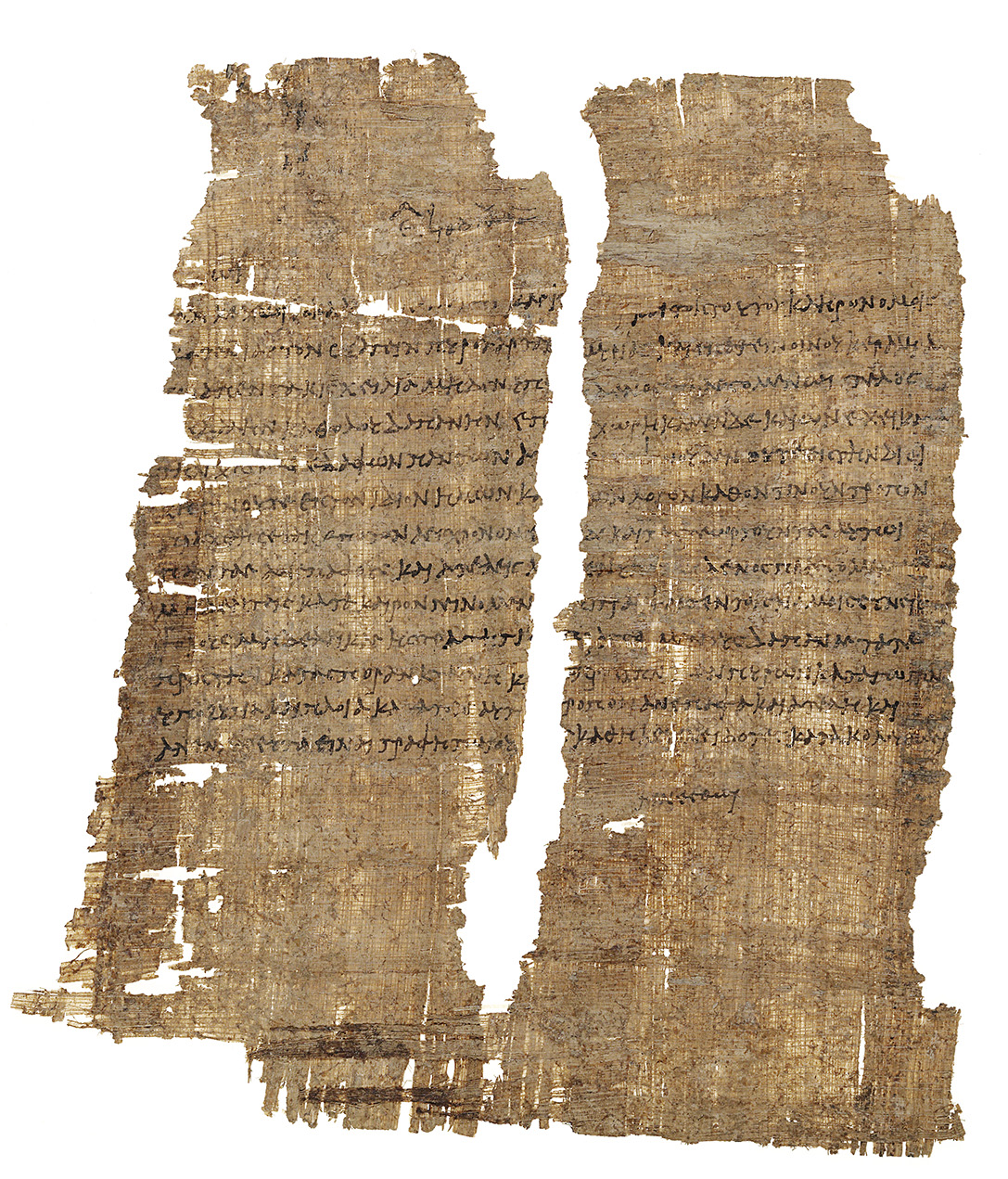
- Scan of the papyrus
- Also known as: P.Bingen 45, Papyrus Berlin 25239 or Cleopatra Papyrus
- Type: Tax exemption
- Date: Before 23 February 33 BC
- Place of origin: Abusir el-Meleq
- Language: Koine Greek
- Material: Papyrus
- Size: 24.2 x 21 cm; 16 lines
- Accession: 25239

Papyrus Bingen 45 (also known as Papyrus Berlin 25239 or the Cleopatra Papyrus) is a 1st-century BC manuscript in Koine Greek, which is now part of the Berlin Papyrus Collection and displayed in the Neues Museum, Berlin.

Being an official ordinance, it mainly grants certain tax exemptions for wine and wheat to a Roman citizen, whose identity is disputed; some scholars argue it is Publius Canidius Crassus, the commander of Mark Antony's land forces in the Battle of Actium (31 BC).

The papyrus is the last extant dated ordinance of a Ptolemaic monarch. It is well known because since 2000 some historians have argued that its concluding subscription "γινέσθωι" (ginésthōi; lit. 'so be it' or 'make it happen') is an autograph of Cleopatra, the last queen of the Ptolemaic Kingdom of Egypt. The papyrus would thus contain the only surviving autograph of a major figure from antiquity.

There exist, however, many points of ongoing scholarly contention regarding the papyrus – including the authorship of its concluding subscription.

== Description and content ==
=== Description ===
The manuscript measures 24.2 cm × 21 cm (9.5 in × 8.3 in) with handwriting in Koine Greek on one side. According to the American scholar Steve Reece, the main body of the text was written "rather carelessly in the large, straight book hand" of a court scribe. The text starts with the date of its receipt (year 19 [of Cleopatra's reign] = year 4 [of the new era], (Note: Bennett's The Egyptian Royal Genealogy Project notes that a new era began when Cleopatra was "granted rule of territories in Phoenicia, Syria, and Cilicia by Antony in late 37 or early 36 = year 16 = year 1 of a new era". The "4" thus corresponds with year 4 of that era (cf. Käppel 2021 on pages 448 and 449). A different view is also voiced by Käppel 2021 on page 156, namely that the "4" corresponds with year 4 of the reign of Ptolemy XIV Philopator.) Meshir 26 [i.e. 23 February 33 BC]) and the name of the recipient follows, but it is not legible. Notably, the receipt date was written by a different person than the main body of the text. The manuscript does not name its author.

=== Content and context ===
Scholarly consensus sees Papyrus Bingen 45 as a prostagma, an official ordinance of a Ptolemaic monarch, the rulers of the Ptolemaic Kingdom, a polity (305–30 BC) in Ancient Egypt during the Hellenistic period.

The ordinance grants extensive relief from taxes and costs to a beneficiary, whose identity is disputed, with some scholars identifying Publius Canidius Crassus while others read Quintus Cascellius (see below). The ordinance exempts him and his heirs from all taxes related to

- the annual exportation of 10,000 artabas of wheat (= 300,000 kg [661,385 lb]),
- the annual importation of 5,000 Coan amphorae of wine (= 130,000 litres [28,595 imp gal; 34,340 US gal] (Note: This conversion into litres is disputed as Käppel 2021 points out that "Coan amphoras" is an unspecified unit.)),
- all lands owned in Egypt and
- all his tenants, animals and boats.

The manuscript is viewed as a letter of one or multiple Ptolemaic rulers (see below) and as the last extant Ptolemaic official ordinance (prostagma). The date of its receipt (23 February 33 BC) places it in the final years of the Ptolemaic Kingdom. It attests to the deep Roman interconnection with Egypt not only within the political but also within the economic realm.

=== Text and translation ===
The papyrus has been translated into English multiple times, inter alia by the American scholars Roger S. Bagnall and Peter Derow in 2004 and Reece in 2017. A German translation was provided by the German scholar Eva Christina Käppel in 2021. According to the Duke Databank of Documentary Papyri, the papyrus can be transcribed as follows (the Leiden Conventions are used); the translation is the one by Reece with minor adaptations to match the transcription:

[Hand 1] ἔλ(αβον) (ἔτους) ιθ δ Μεχ(εὶρ) κ̣ϛ

[Hand 2] [...]ωι σ̣υνκεχωρήκαμ̣[εν] Π̣ο̣π̣λ̣ίωι Κανιδ̣[ίω]ι (Note: The editio princeps reads "Π̣ . . . ιωι Κασιώ̣[τη]ι" (a man from Kasios), van Minnen 2001, pp. 74–75 reads "Π̣ο̣π̣λ̣ίωι Κανιδ̣[ίω]ι" (Publius Canidius [Crassus]; used here), Zimmermann 2002, pp. 133–135 reads "Ḳο̣ί̣ν̣τ̣ωι Καϲκ[ελίω]ι̣" (Quintus Cascellius).) καὶ τοῖς τούτου κληρονόμοις κατʼ ἐνιαυτὸν ἐξάγειν πυροῦ ἀρτάβ[ας] μυρίας καὶ εἰσάγειν οἴνου κεράμια Κ̣ῷα πεντακισχείλια (Note: Usually spelled "πεντακισχίλια" (DDbDP).) μηδὲν ὑπὸ [μ]η̣δενὸς π̣ρ̣ασσομένωι τέλος [μ]ηδʼ ἄλην (Note: Usually spelled "ἄλλην" (DDbDP).) καθόλου δαπάνην· ἐπ[ικε]χωρήκαμεν δὲ καὶ ὧν ἔχει κατ̣ὰ̣ τὴν χώρ̣α̣ν̣ ἐδαφῶν πάντων ἀτ̣[έλει]α̣[ν ἐ]φ' ᾡ (Note: The edition princeps reads "ἀ[νε]π̣[ά]φῳ", van Minnen 2001, p. 74 reads "ἀτ̣[έλει]α̣[ν ἐ]φ' ᾧ" (used here).) · οὐδὲν οὔτε εἰς τὴν διοίκησιν οὔτε εἰς τὸν ἴδιον ἡμῶν κα[θ’ ὅλ]ων (Note: The editio princeps reads "κα[τοίκ]ων", van Minnen 2001, p. 74 reads "κα[ὶ τέκν]ων" ("and children"), Zimmermann 2002, pp. 135–136 reads "κα[ὶ ὑ]μῶν" ("and of you [plural]"), van Minnen 2018, p. 292 reads "κα[θ᾽ ὅλ]ων" (used here).) λόγον καθʼ ὁντινοῦν τρόπον πραχθήσεται ἐπὶ τὸν ἀεὶ χρόνον· ε[ἶναι] (Note: The editio princes read "ἔ[τι]", van Minnen 2001, p. 74 reads "ε[ἶναι]" (used here).) δὲ καὶ τοὺς γεωργοῦντας αὐτῶι πάντας ἀνεπάφους καὶ ἀτελεῖς μ[ηδ]ὲν ὑπ̣ὸ̣ μ̣η̣δενὸς πρασσομέν[ο]υς̣ μηδʼ ἐν ταῖς κατὰ καιρὸν γεινομέν[αις] (Note: Usually spelled "γινομέν[αις]" (DDbDP).) [ἐ]πιγραφαῖς ἐν τοῖς νομοῖς συνεισ- φόρους μηδὲ λαϊκὰς ἢ στρατηγικ̣[ὰς] πρασσομένους δαπάνας· τά τε πρὸς τὴν̣ κατασπορὰν κτήνη κα[ὶ τ]ὰ̣ πρὸς τὴν τ̣ῶν πυρῶν καταγωγὴν ὑποζύγια καὶ πλοῖα κατ̣ὰ τὸν αὐτ[ὸν] τ̣ρόπον ἀνέπαφα καὶ ἀτελῆ καὶ ἀνενγ̣άρευτα (Note: Usually spelled "ἀνεγγάρευτα" (DDbDP).) εἶναι· γραφήτωι (Note: Usually spelled "γραφήτω" (DDbDP).) οὖ[ν οἷ]ς καθήκει (Note: The edition princeps reads "ὡ]ς καθήκει", van Minnen 2001, p. 74 reads "οἷ]ς καθήκει" (used here).), ἵνʼ εἰδότες κατακολουθῶσι·

[Hand 3 (disputed)] γινέσθωι (Note: The editio princeps reads "γενέσθωι", van Minnen 2001, p. 74 reads "γινέσθωι" (used here).)
[Hand 1] Received year 19 = year 4, month of Mecheir, day 26

[Hand 2] To [...]. We have granted permission to Publius Canidius (Crassus) and to his heirs each year to export ten thousand artabas of wheat and to import five thousand Coan amphoras of wine, being exempt from any tax from anyone and from any other cost whatsoever. We have also granted that for all the properties that he owns throughout the land [...] he shall be exempt from everything, both for the government administration and for the private account of us and [...] in any manner for all time. His agricultural workers too shall be exempt from all mandatory service and taxes levied by anyone, even from any occasional special levies in the nomes and from civilian and military expenses. His animals used for agricultural work, and his draught animals and boats used for the transport of wheat, shall in the same manner be exempt from personal service, taxes, and seizure. Let it be written to whomever it is a concern in order that they may know and obey.

[Hand 3 (disputed)] So be it.

== History ==
=== Excavation ===
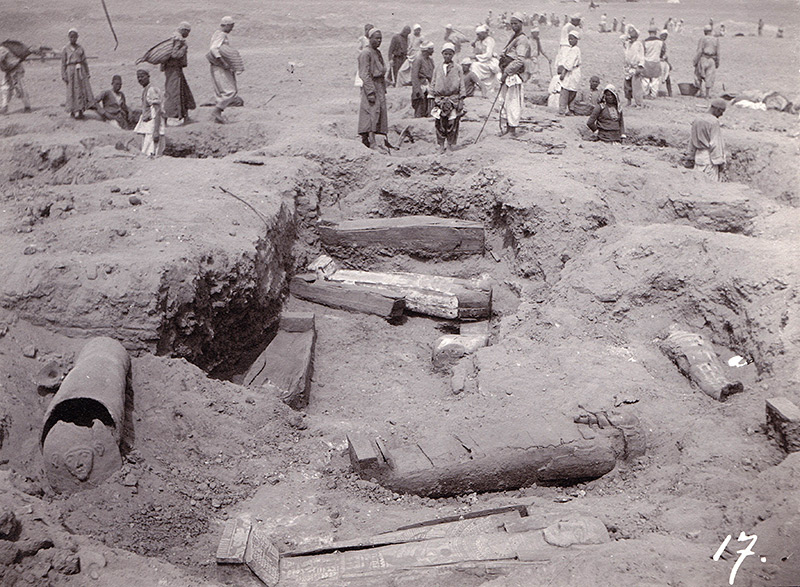
Excavations led by Rubensohn in Abusir el-Meleq in 1903

Papyrus Bingen 45 was found between 1903 and 1905 during excavations led by Otto Rubensohn in Abusir el-Meleq. An ancient cemetery was excavated and large quantities of mostly documentary papyri from the second half of the 1st century BC were found that had been re-used as mummy cartonnage in the 1st century AD. Old office papers found during the excavations stem from Alexandria and have been published in part in Berliner griechische Urkunden Volume IV (BGU IV).

=== Publication and autograph discussion ===
The papyrus was not edited or published until 2000 and until then remained in storage at the Egyptian Museum of Berlin still attached to mummy casing. In 2000, the Greek scholar Panagiota Sarischouli published the editio princeps of the papyrus in a Festschrift for the Belgian papyrologist Jean Bingen, thereby naming the document Papyrus Bingen 45 (or P.Bingen 45). Sarischouli did not, however, associate the document with Cleopatra and interpreted the manuscript as a private contract rather than an official ordinance (prostagma).

The view that the papyrus was an official ordinance and contains an autograph by Cleopatra was put forward first in 2000 by the American historian Peter van Minnen in the journal Ancient Society. The fact that the papyrus arguably contains an autograph of Cleopatra was announced to the public on 22 October 2000 in The Sunday Times and on 24 October 2000 in the Frankfurter Allgemeine Zeitung.

A special exhibition of the papyrus commenced on 26 October 2000 in the Egyptian Museum of Berlin. The papyrus was later part of the exhibition "Cleopatra of Egypt: From History to Myth" at the Palazzo Ruspoli in Rome, at the British Museum in London and the Field Museum in Chicago. In 2010, the exhibition "Cleopatra: The Search for the Last Queen of Egypt" featured the papyrus again in the United States.

== Points of contention ==
Partly due to the lacunae of the manuscript, several points of contention exist regarding it with no clear scholarly consensus:

=== Cleopatra autograph ===
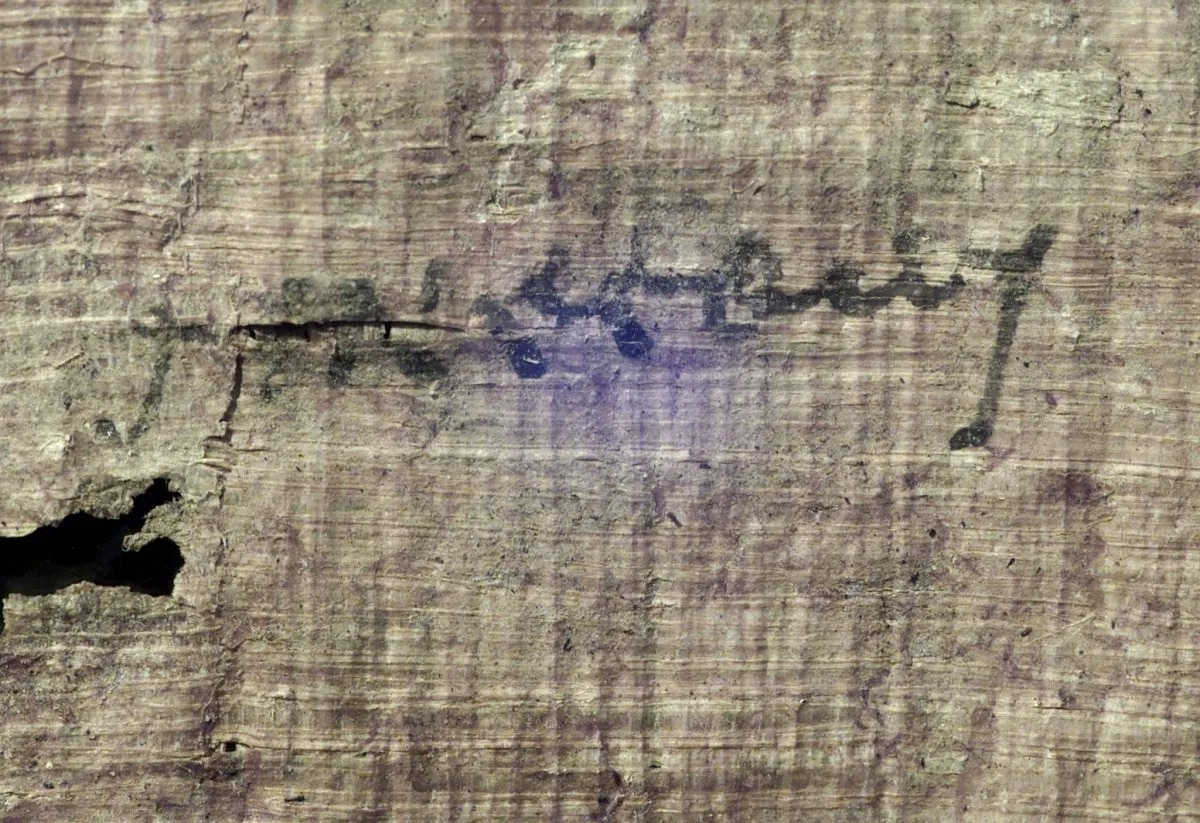
Close-up of the disputed γινέσθωι subscription

The papyrus ends with the subscription "γινέσθωι" (ginésthōi; lit. 'so be it' or 'make it happen'), arguably written by a different person. Van Minnen sees this subscription as an autograph of Cleopatra. This would be remarkable as no other autograph of a major figure from antiquity exists. He argues that "[o]nly a ruler can sign a text into law. To leave that to a trusted scribe would be an open invitation to bribe that scribe." Furthermore, he contendes that "power must be based on an exclusive prerogative," asserting that Ptolemaic monarchs held the sole right to subscribe official documents issued in their name.

The view that Cleopatra is the author of this subscription is shared by the American classicist Margaret M. Miles and the German historian Klaus Zimmermann. Duane W. Roller, the American archeologist, also supports it with the argument that countersigning documents was a known practise of monarchs of the Ptolemaic Kingdom.

Antonia Sarri, a professor at the National and Kapodistrian University of Athens, disputes this. She sees no change of hand between the subscription (γινέσθωι) and the main body of the text; in her view the subscription was authored by the same person as the text above it. She points out that the density of the ink remains the same, suggesting that the pressure on the pen did not change, and furthermore that the personal characteristics of the handwriting do not vary between the subscription and the main body of the text. The American historians Roger S. Bagnall and Peter Derow also see the authorship of Cleopatra as "less likely". The French historian Bernard Legras is skeptical as well and considers a high-ranking Alexandrian official as its more likely author.

In her study of the prostagma of the Ptolemaic rulers, the German scholar Eva Christina Käppel joins the view that no change of hand happened between the concluding "γινέσθωι" and the main body of the text. In her view, the letters of the subscription are indeed smaller, but displaying the same idiosyncrasies as the main body of the text: a slightly angular epsilon, a left-facing serif at the bottom of the iota and a superfluous iota adscript (Note: An extensive study of the superfluous iota adscript is provided by Reece 2017.) in the imperative, which also appears one line earlier in the main body of the text (γραφήτωι).

=== Monarch attributed as sender ===
There is academic consensus that the official ordinance must be attributed to a Ptolemaic monarch, as they had the sole authority to grant tax relief. There exists, however, dispute on whether Cleopatra alone or her together with her son Caesarion – the only biological son of Julius Caesar and co-ruler in 33 BC – are the rulers the ordinance is to be attributed to. Van Minnen argues that Cleopatra is the only monarch attributed, focussing on the fact that the double date on top of the papyrus (year 19 = 4) refers exclusively to Cleopatra, and the use of the first-person plural should thus also refer only to her. Käppel disagrees and sees the letter as attributed to Cleopatra and Caesarion together, because both were nominally co-equal rulers and should thus only be authorised together to issue ordinances.

=== Beneficiary ===
The identity of the beneficiary of the extensive tax relief is also contested. Scholarly consensus holds that the beneficiary was male and one person and that his name starts with "Κα-". Van Minnen argues that the well-known Publius Canidius Crassus, the commander of Mark Antony's land forces in the Battle of Actium (31 BC), was the beneficiary. Roller supports this reading.

Zimmermann disputes this view and has identified the name Quintus Cascellius (Κοίντος Κασκέλιος, occurring in the text in the dative case as Ḳο̣ί̣ν̣τ̣ωι Κασκ[ελίω]ι̣) in a close reading of the papyrus; a person otherwise unknown to history. This view is shared by Bagnall and Derow. Käppel also sees Quintus Cascellius as the beneficiary; she identifies the form found in the text as Κ̣ο̣ί̣ν̣τωι Κασκ[ελίω]ι̣, (Note: For consistency reasons "σ" is used here. Zimmermann 2002, pp. 133–135 and Käppel (2021), p. 158 read a lunate sigma ("ϲ") here.) arguing that even though the lower curve of the sigma in the name has almost completely faded, the kappa still seems sufficiently clear to her.

=== Addressee ===
A further point of contention is the addressee of the papyrus, meaning not the beneficiary of the ordinance but the person to whom the letter is nominally directed. Zimmermann sees Caesarion as its addressee. His argument for this mainly rests on his reading of lines 7 and 8 dealing with the tax accounts from which the beneficiary should be exempt.

Legras and van Minnen contest this, the latter arguing that an unknown high-ranking official was the addressee. Käppel also rejects this view, noting that the concluding imperative "γινέσθωι" seems entirely unfitting for a letter addressing a co-ruler.

=== Place of origin ===
Finally, the place of origin of the manuscript is in dispute. Van Minnen has argued that many of the papyri found in Abusir el-Melek stem from Alexandria and thus sees this city as the origin of the papyrus. Käppel disagrees, arguing that the mummy cartonnage found in the immediate vicinity of the papyrus in the same sarcophagus stem from Heracleopolis. She thus sees the letter not as the original from the capital Alexandria but as copy sent to an authority in Heracleopolis.
