= Papyrus Berlin =

Papyrus Berlin may refer to several papyri kept in the Berlin Papyrus Collection of the Egyptian Museum of Berlin, including:

- Papyrus Berlin 3027 or the Erman Papyrus, a medical papyrus
- Papyrus Berlin 3033 or the Westcar Papyrus, a storytelling papyrus
- Papyrus Berlin 3038 or the Brugsch Papyrus, a medical papyrus
- Papyrus Berlin 6619, a mathematical papyrus
- Papyrus Berlin 6774 or Papyrus 79, a copy of the New Testament in Greek
- Papyrus Berlin 8502 or Berlin Codex, a Coptic manuscript of biblical apocrypha
- Papyrus Berlin 8683 or Papyrus 8, a copy of the New Testament in Greek
- Papyrus Berlin 11529, an unidentified Greek mathematical text
- Papyrus Berlin 11765 or Uncial 0189, a parchment manuscript of the New Testament
- Papyrus Berlin 13447 or Behistun papyrus, an Aramaic-Egyptian fragmentary copy of the Behistun inscription
- Papyrus Berlin 16388 or Papyrus 25, an early copy of the New Testament in Greek
- Papyrus Berlin 17213, a Koine Greek fragment of the Septuagint, dated to the 3rd century CE
- Papyrus Berlin 25239 or Papyrus Bingen 45, a Papyrus arguably containing an autograph of Cleopatra
