= Berlin Papyrus Collection =

Papyrus collection

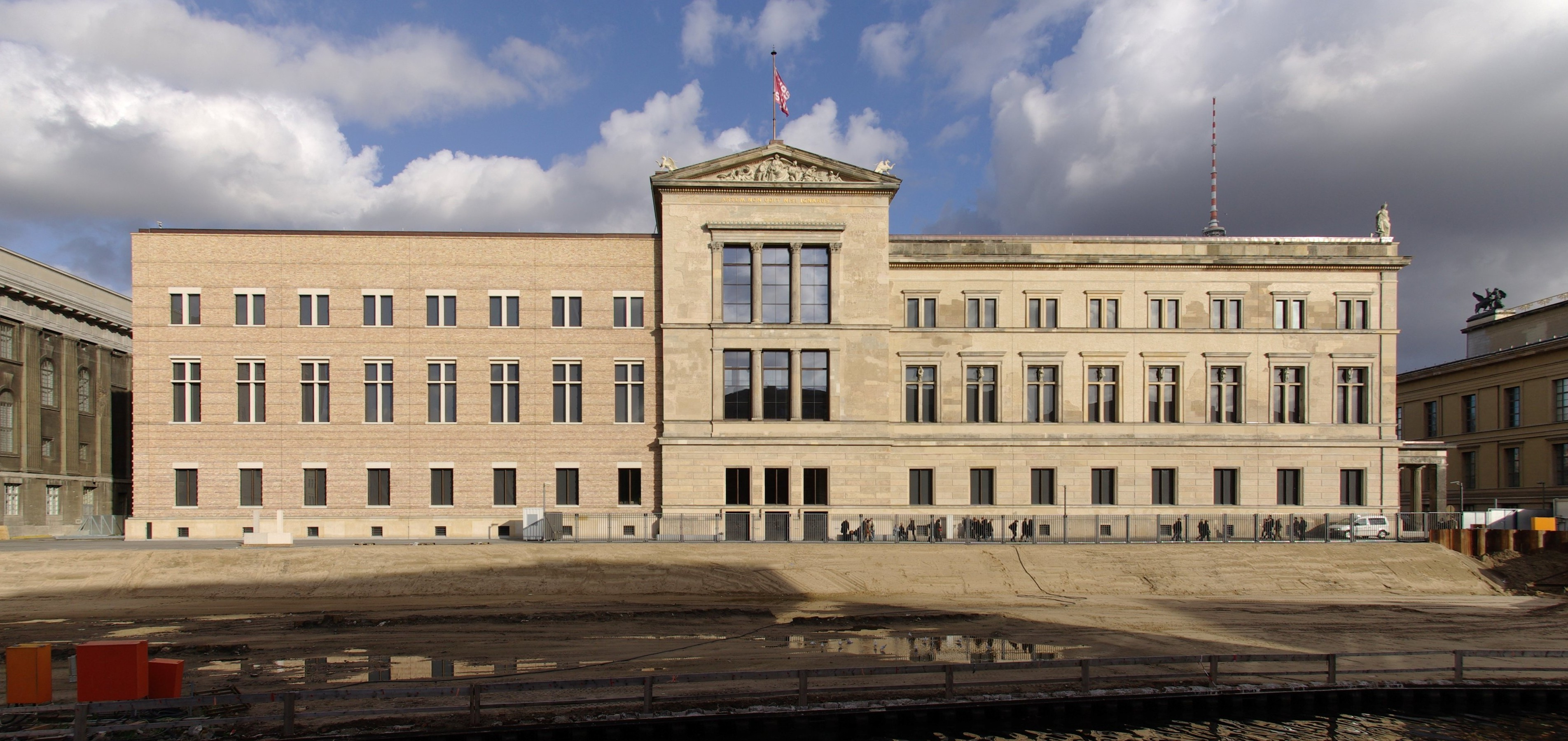
- Exterior of the Neues Museum
- Housed at: Neues Museum, Berlin, Germany
- Website: berlpap.smb.museum/sammlung

The Berlin Papyrus Collection (German: Papyrussammlung Berlin) of the Staatliche Museen zu Berlin is the oldest and foremost collection of papyri in Germany and one of the five largest collections worldwide.

It is mainly housed in the Neues Museum and is part of the Egyptian Museum and Papyrus Collection of Berlin. It comprises tens of thousands of papyri alongside 7,000 ostraka and further inscribed items. The texts appear in a wide range of scripts and languages including hieroglyphs, hieratic, Demotic and Greek.

The collection originated in 1823 and grew through purchases and excavations, especially under the Prussian Papyrus Enterprise (1901–1910) led by Otto Rubensohn and later Friedrich Zucker.

Notable manuscripts include Papyrus Berlin 3022, a manuscript of the Story of Sinuhe, Papyrus Berlin 3033 (the Westcar Papyrus), narrating five miraculous tales and Papyrus Berlin 25239 (Papyrus Bingen 45), which arguably contains an autograph of Cleopatra.

== Collection and important individual papyri ==
=== Overview of the collection ===
The Berlin Papyrus Collection includes tens of thousands of papyri, 7,000 broken pieces of pottery with inscriptions (ostraka), more than 1,000 parchment and around 500 paper items, 200 textiles bearing inscriptions, more than 100 wooden and wax tablets, a number of leather manuscripts and bindings and a small quantity of lead tablets. The items bear inscriptions in Hieroglyphs, Hieratic, Demotic, Coptic, Greek, Latin, Aramaic, Pehlevi, Arabic, Samaritan, Hebrew and Syriac. They stem from the Old Kingdom of Egypt (c. 2700–2200 BC) up to the Middle Ages.

The papyri of the collection are numbered and are usually cited as "Papyrus Berlin [item number]" ("Berlin Papyrus", "pBerlin", "Pap. Berl.", "Berl. Pap." and "P.Berl" are also sometimes used). Famous individual papyri of the collection include:

=== Story of Sinuhe – Papyrus Berlin 3022 ===
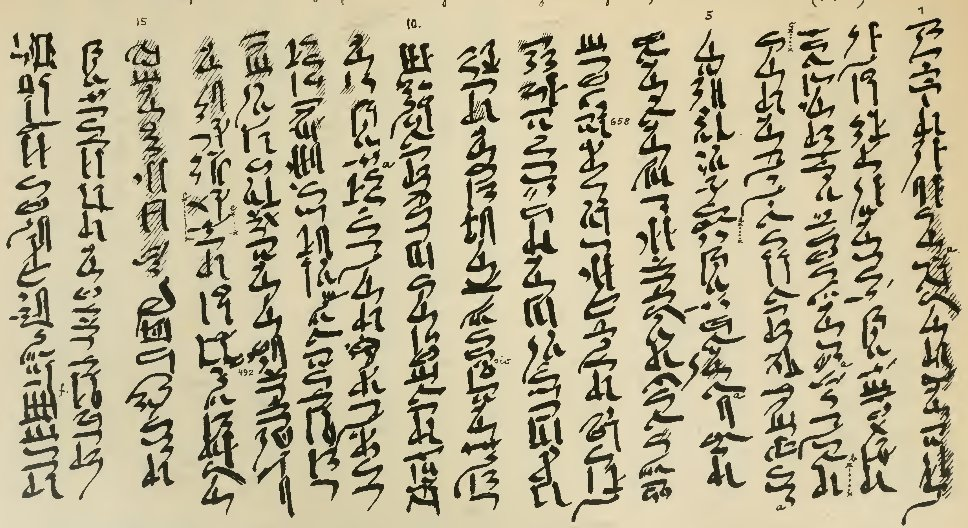
Papyrus Berlin 3022

The collection contains a manuscript (Papyrus Berlin 3022) of the Story of Sinuhe, possibly the best-known literary work of ancient Egypt. The manuscript – a papyrus roll of about 5 m (16 ft) – is written in hieratic on papyrus and stems from c. 1800 BC during the Twelfth Dynasty of Egypt.

=== Westcar Papyrus – Papyrus Berlin 3033 ===
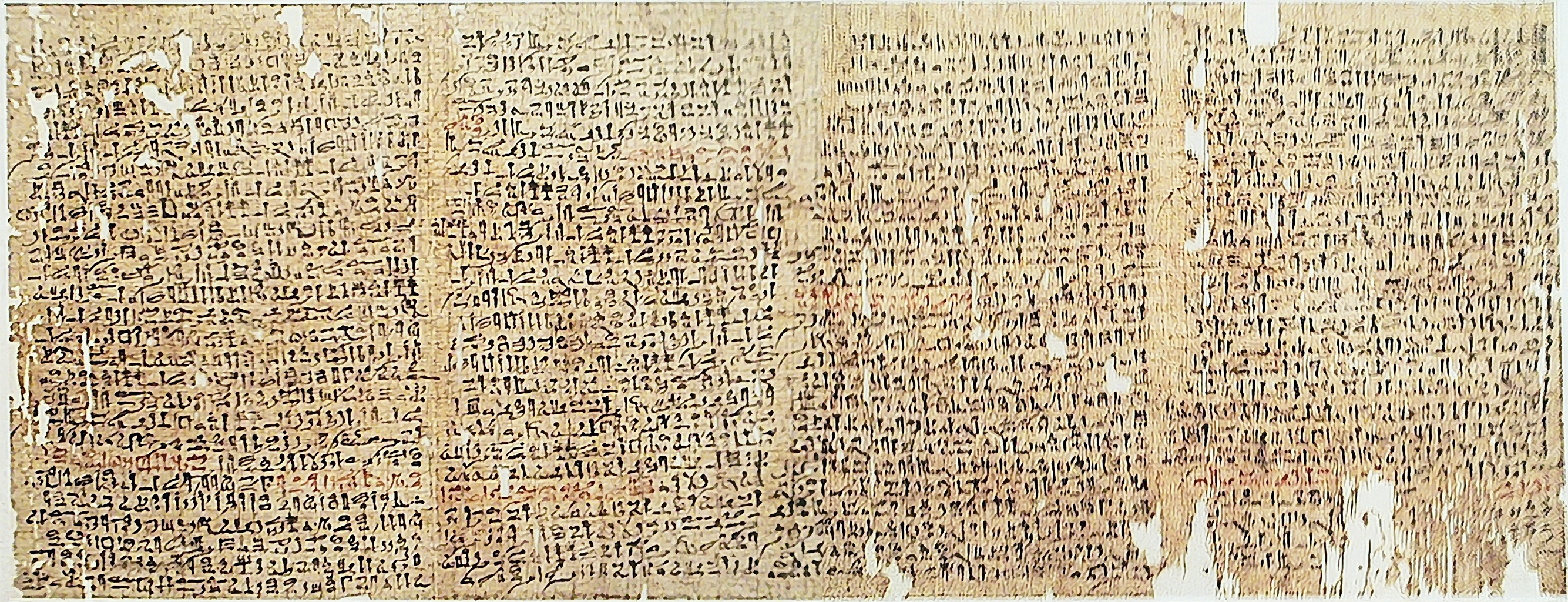
Papyrus Berlin 3033 (Westcar Papyrus)

The Westcar Papyrus (Papyrus Berlin 3033) is a manuscript of the collection containing five stories about miracles. The text is written on papyrus and is dated to the end of the 17th century BC. It is named after Henry Westcar (1798–1868), a British adventurer, who discovered the papyrus in Egypt.

=== The Persians by Timotheus of Miletus – Papyrus Berlin 9875 ===
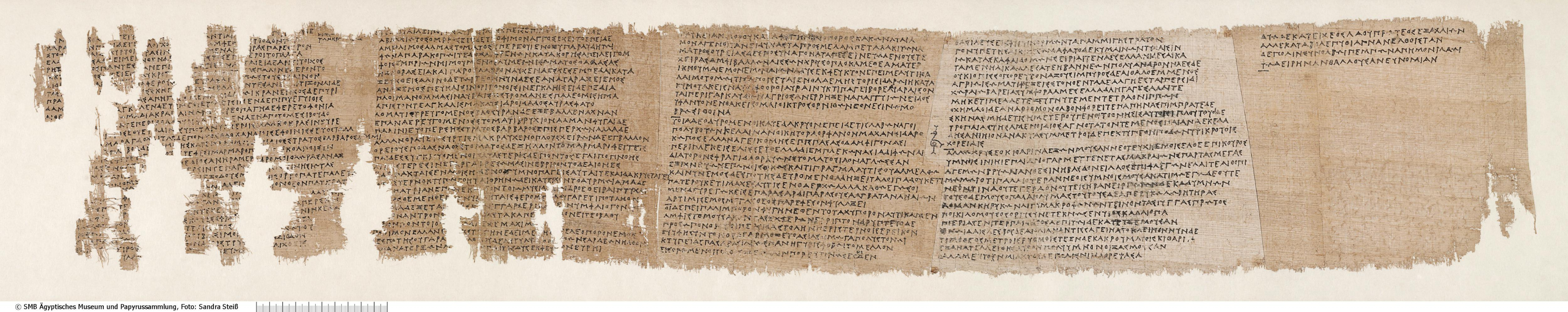
Papyrus Berlin 9875

The Papyrus Berlin 9875 is a manuscript from the 4th century BC containing parts of the poem The Persians by Timotheus of Miletus. It is the oldest known papyrus roll in Greek.

=== Cleopatra Papyrus – Papyrus Berlin 25239 ===
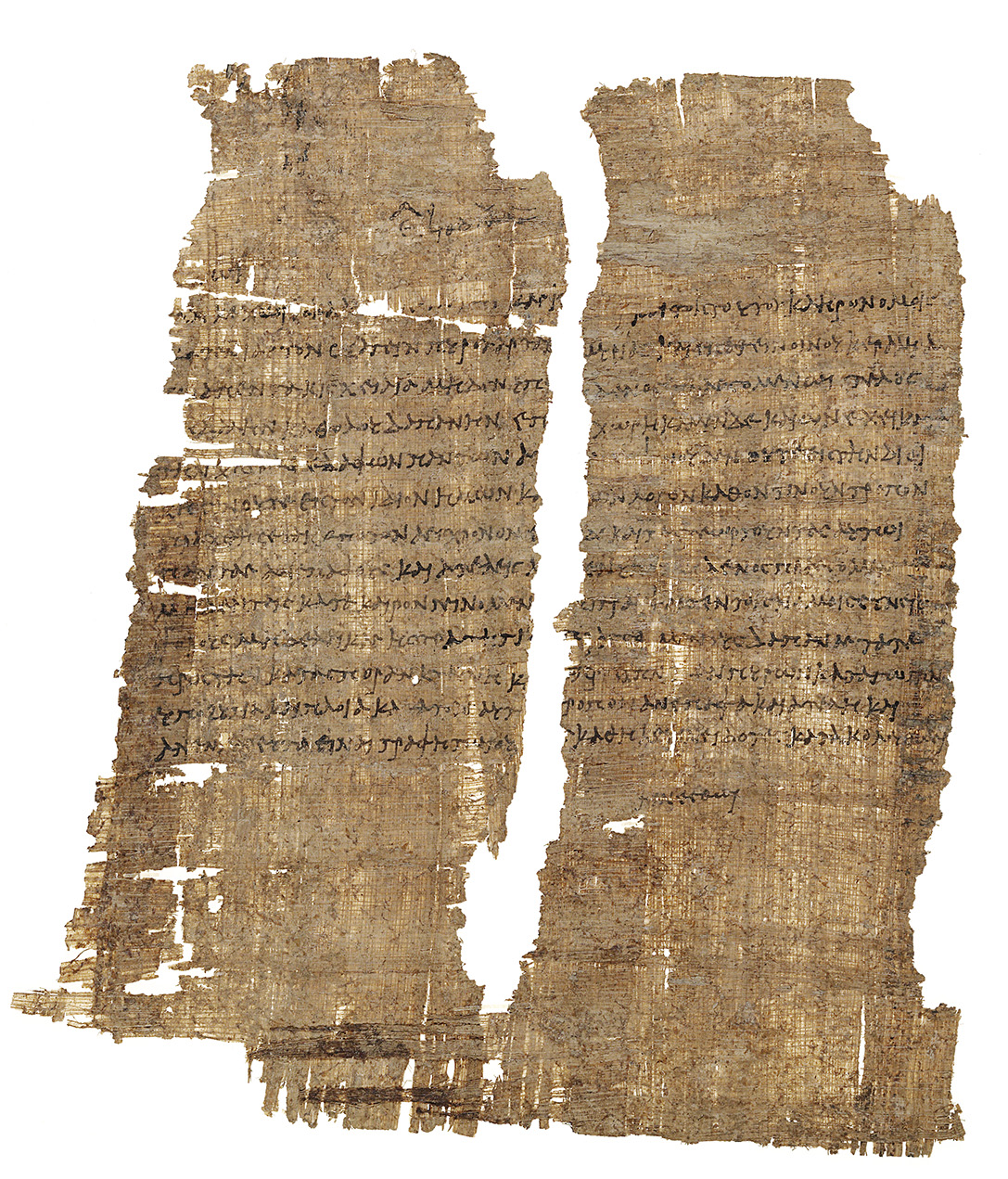
Papyrus Berlin 25239

The Cleopatra Papyrus or the Papyrus Bingen 45 (Papyrus Berlin 25239) is a 1st-century BC manuscript granting certain tax exemptions for wine and wheat to a Roman citizen, whose identity is disputed with some scholars arguing it is Publius Canidius Crassus, the commander of Mark Antony's land forces in the Battle of Actium (31 BC). The papyrus is well known because since 2000 some historians have argued that its concluding subscription "γινέσθωι" (lit. 'so be it' or 'make it happen') is an autograph of Cleopatra, the last queen of the Ptolemaic Kingdom of Egypt.

=== Other individual papyri ===
- Papyrus Berlin 3027 (or Erman Papyrus)
- Papyrus Berlin 3038 (or Brugsch Papyrus)
- Berlin Papyrus 6619
- Papyrus Berlin 6774 (or Papyrus 79)
- Papyrus Berlin 8502 (or Berlin Codex)
- Papyrus Berlin 8683 (or Papyrus 8)
- Papyrus Berlin 11529
- Papyrus Berlin 11765 (or Uncial 0189)
- Papyrus Berlin 13447 (or Behistun papyrus)
- Papyrus Berlin 16388 (or Papyrus 25)
- Papyrus Berlin 17213

== History ==
=== 19th century ===
The Berlin Papyrus Collection grew out of 55 papyri purchased in Egypt in 1823 by the Prussian officer and adventurer Heinrich Menu von Minutoli for the Prussian Academy. In 1837, more papyri were added from the collection of Giuseppe Passalacqua, the director of the Berlin Egyptian Museum, including the important medical papyrus "Collection for Relieving Pains". In the beginning, the papyri were housed in the Monbijou Palace.

Other documents of importance were acquired in 1837 from the collection of Bernardo Drovetti, an Italian diplomat and, explorer. In 1853, the Berlin Papyrus Collection was furthered for the first time not by the purchase of papyri, but by papyri found during excavations at Saqqara headed by Heinrich Karl Brugsch. In 1857, Karl Richard Lepsius, who succeeded Passalacqua as the director of the museum, acquired papyri from the collection of Giovanni Anastasi including two important magical formularies.

In 1877/1878 the purchases of papyri continued. Under the instigation of the German consul Gustav Travers some papyri recently found in Fayum were acquired for the collection, while the main body of the Fayum papyri went to form the basis for the Rainer collection in Vienna.

The Westcar Papyrus was acquired in 1885 from the private collection of Karl Richard Lepsius.

=== 20th century before World War I ===
In 1897, a leading German papyrologist, Ulrich Wilcken, made an appeal during a congress of the precursor of the German Philologists' Association for German excavations of papyri. This appeal together with a Prussian push for new papyri lead to the formation of the Prussian Papyrus Enterprise (Preußische Papyrusunternehmen) in 1901, which was set up to engage in excavations in Egypt; its fruits were added to the Berlin collection. Otto Rubensohn was chosen as its head 1901.

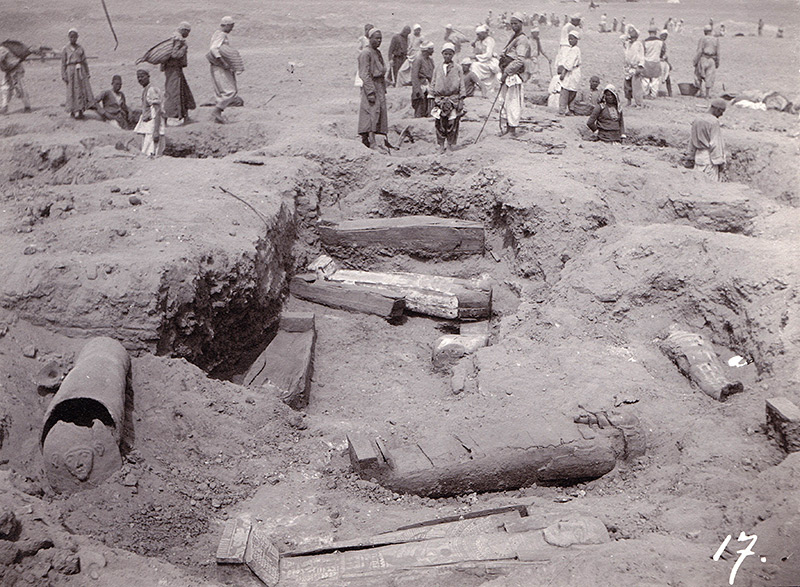
Excavation led by Rubensohn in Abusir el-Meleq

Rubensohn headed excavations for the Prussian Papyrus Enterprise from 1901 to 1907. He started with excavations in 1901/1902 in Fayum, which were not very successful. From 1902 to 1905, Abusir el-Meleq was the place of his explorations. During this successful excavation, the Papyrus Bingen 45 (Papyrus Berlin 25239) was found. From 1903 to 1906, Hermopolis was the place of excavations. These resulted in 30 tin boxes full of papyri. From 1906 to 1907 the Nile island of Elephantine was chosen. Many papyri were found, including the oldest Greek papyri in Egypt, a marriage contract from 310 BC (Papyrus Berlin 13500). Other important papyri include the archive of Jedaniah, son of Gemariah, the head of a Jewish congregation.

Concurrently, at the turn of the century, Prussia wanted to improve the literary part of the collection and established the Commission for the Purchase of Greek literary papyri from Egypt (Commission zur Erwerbung griechisch-litterarischer Papyri aus Egypten). Its aim was to secure the position of Berlin as a leading cultural city especially vis-à-vis London. To achieve this, the purchase of literary papyri was deemed necessary, because Berlin had lots of documentary Greek papyri – from 1895 onwards published in Berliner griechische Urkunden (Berlin Greek Documents, BGU) – but only few literary Greek papyri, for which in 1904 the publication series Berliner Klassiker Texte (Berlin Classics Texts, BKT) was formed.

It was feared, however, that competition from within the German Empire, namely from Leipzig (Leipziger Papyruskommission), from the National Academic Library in Strasbourg, from Ernst Kornemann (capitalised by a rich patron) and from the University of Würzburg, would drive up the prices for papyri in Egypt, therefore a cartel was formed in 1903 (back-dated to 1 October 1902): the Papyrus-Kartel (Papyrus cartel). The cartel had two sections, one for Greek documentary papyri (section A) and one for Greek literary papyri (section B). Because the Berlin collection had already enough documentary papyri the collection was only part of section B of the cartel and managed this section. As it used the Prussian Papyrus Enterprise to facilitate its business, Otto Rubensohn was not only responsible for the excavations but also for the purchases of papyri for the collection.

All the papyri purchased by the cartel for section B were catalogued by the authorities of the Berlin museums and every 6 months (later every 12 months) an index was sent to all members of the cartel, and everyone could choose which papyri they wanted to acquire. If only one cartel member wanted to acquire the papyrus, they had to pay the price for which the papyrus had originally been purchased in Egypt. If more than one member was interested, than the winner was chosen at random.

Otto Rubensohn's time at the Prussian Papyrus Enterprise ended on 31 March 1907 and he was succeeded by Friedrich Zucker. Zucker headed the Prussian Papyrus Enterprise until its demise and the end of excavations in 1910. Important excavations were made by Zucker in Philadelphia (Faiyum) in 1908–1909 and Dimê 1909–1910. In 1912, Berlin left the cartel and with the outbreak of World War I, the cartel ceased to exist.

=== After World War II ===
After the end of World War II, the collection was expanded with the collection of Hugo Ibscher (1962 and 1967), a Coptic evangelium (Papyrus Berlin 22220) in 1967 and the repurchase of documents lost during the war.

== Editions and database ==
=== Editions ===
The Berliner griechische Urkunden (BGU) has been published in 22 volumes since 1895 and is currently published by De Gruyter. The series is devoted to publishing the around 3400 documents in Greek.

The Berliner Klassiker Texte (BKT) is a series devoted to publishing the literary papyri and other documents; its current publisher is also De Gruyter. It has been published since 1904. 10 volumes have been published.

=== Database ===
The Berlin Papyrus Database (Berliner Papyrusdatenbank, BerlPap) is a project of the Egyptian Museum and Papyrus Collection of Berlin sponsored by the German Research Foundation to digitize the papyri of the collection in Greek and Latin and since 2023 also the Coptic literary texts. The digitized papyri can be accessed freely online.

== See also ==
- Papyrus Berlin
