= Chris Bennett =

Chris Bennett may refer to:

- Chris Bennett (admiral) (1937–2021), South African admiral and author
- Chris Bennett (hammer thrower) (born 1989), British hammer thrower
- Chris Bennett (hurler) (born 1996), Irish hurler
- Chris Bennett (musician) (born 1948), American singer, dancer and composer
- Chris Bennett (soccer) (born 1952), former Canadian international and NASL soccer player
- Chris Bennett (egyptologist) (1953–2014), British-born American Egyptologist who founded The Egyptian Royal Genealogy Project
- Christopher L. Bennett, American science fiction author
- Beck Bennett (born Christopher Beck Bennett; born 1984), actor
