= BGU =

BGU may refer to:

- Bakke Graduate University, a United States accredited graduate school of Dallas, TX
- Bangassou Airport, a public use airport located near Bangassou, Mbomou, the Central African Republic
- Bau Geo Umwelt, a department of the Technical University of Munich
- Ben-Gurion University of the Negev in Beersheba, Israel
- Birla Global University in Bhubaneswar, India
- Birregurra railway station, Australia
- Bishkek Humanities University in Kyrgyzstan
- Bishop Grosseteste University, a public university in the city of Lincoln, England
- Border Guard Unit of the Ghana Armed Forces
- Berliner griechische Urkunden, a collection of papyrus documents
