= P79 =

P79 may refer to:

- HMS Vulpine (P79), a submarine of the Royal Navy
- INS Kiltan (P79), a corvette of the Indian Navy
- Northrop XP-79, an American experimental fighter aircraft
- P79 road (Latvia)
- Papyrus 79, a biblical manuscript
