= Slavery in ancient Egypt =

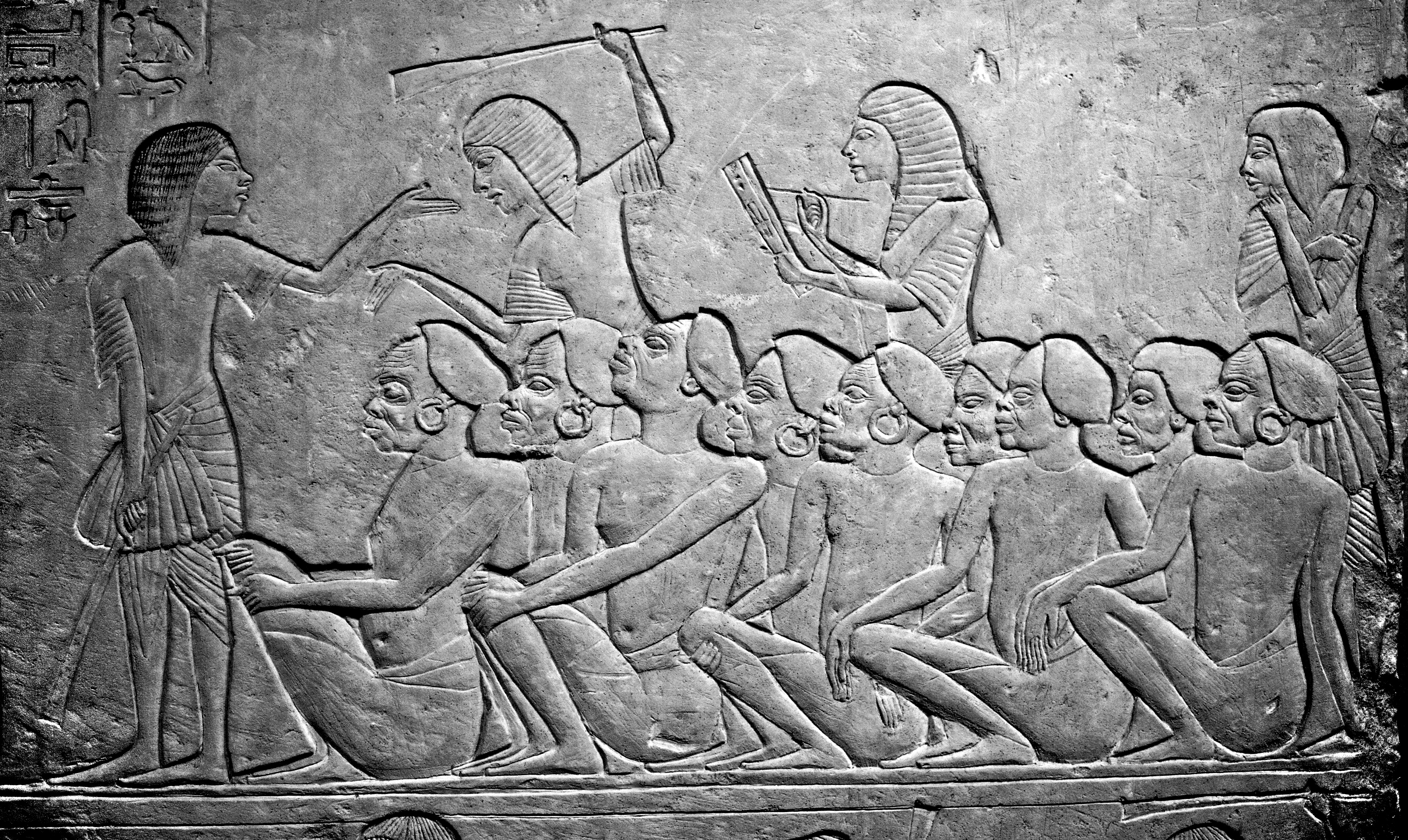
Kushite prisoners of war watched over by Egyptians, waiting to be deported into Egypt. Relief from the tomb of Horemheb in Saqqara.

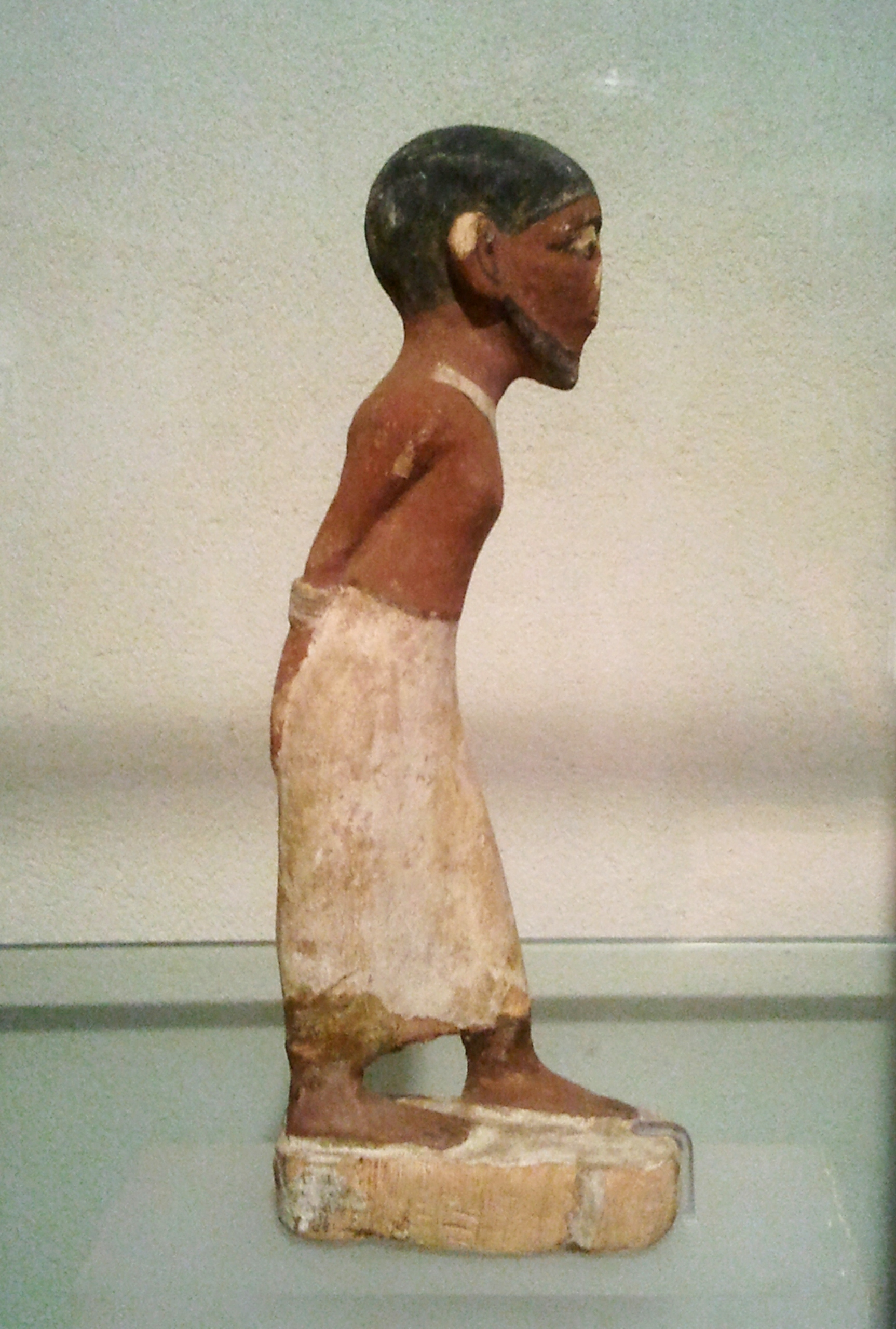
A figurine from Egypt of a Semitic slave

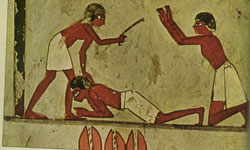
A slave being beaten

Slavery in ancient Egypt existed at least since the Old Kingdom period. Discussions of slavery in Pharaonic Egypt are complicated by terminology used by the Egyptians to refer to different classes of servitude over the course of dynastic history. Interpretation of the textual evidence of classes of slaves in ancient Egypt has been difficult to differentiate by word usage alone. There were three types of enslavement in Ancient Egypt: chattel slavery, bonded labor, and forced labor. Even these seemingly well-differentiated types of slavery are susceptible to individual interpretation. Egypt's labor culture encompassed many people of various social ranks.

The word translated as "slave" from the Egyptian language does not neatly align with modern terms or traditional labor roles. Egyptian texts refer to words 'bꜣk' and 'ḥm' that mean laborer or servant. Some Egyptian language refers to slave-like people as 'sqr-ꜥnḫ', meaning "living prisoner; prisoner of war". Forms of forced labor and servitude are seen throughout all of ancient Egypt. Egyptians wanted dominion over their kingdoms and would alter political and social ideas to benefit their economic state. The existence of slavery not only was profitable for ancient Egypt, but made it easier to keep power and stability of the kingdoms.

== History ==
=== Old Kingdom ===
During the Old Kingdom Period, prisoners of war captured by the Egyptian army were called sqr.w-ꜥnḫ ("living prisoners"; the root meaning of sqr is "strike; hit," thus nominalized as "(one who has been) struck down"). This was not a distinct term for "slave" but for prisoners of war, as already stated. The term, 'ḥm', emerged with at least two distinct usages: 1) "Laborer" and 2) "Servant". Documented evidence exists as early as the reign of Sneferu, in the 26th century BC, war campaigns in the territory of Nubia, in which war-captives would be labeled skrw-ꜥnḫ - and Libyans all of whom would be used to perform labour—regardless of their will otherwise—or – if warranted, would be conscripted into the military.

Reliefs from this period depict captured prisoners of war with their hands tied behind their backs. Nubia was targeted—because of its close geographical proximity, cultural similarity, and competitiveness in imperial dominion, and then the scope of campaigns intended to acquire foreign war captives expanded to Libya and Asia. Local Egyptians also entered into servitude due to an unstable economy and debts. Officials who abused their power could also be reduced to servitude.

=== First Intermediate Period and Middle Kingdom ===
During the First Intermediate Period, slaves were first defined as men with dignity but remained treated as property. When borrowed money owed to wealthier individuals in Egyptian society could not be paid back, family members – especially women – were sold in return into slavery. During the Middle Kingdom, records show that coerced laborers included conscripts (hsbw), fugitives (tsjw), and royal laborers (hmw-nsw). The Reisner Papyrus and El Lahun papyri depict prisoners being employed in state enterprises. Papyrus Brooklyn 35.1446 also shows forced labor being performed on arable state land.

Slaves, especially of Levantine origin were grouped in ghetto camps to perform labor for the state where they lived in harsh conditions, often including beating by their masters. The term for "male Asiatic" in ancient Egyptian language became synonymous with "slave".

If an individual coerced into labor attempted to escape or was absent from their work, they might be condemned to coerced labor for life. One of the Lahun papyri describes an example of this occurring: "Order issued by the Great Prison in year 31, third month of the summer season, day 5, that he be condemned with all his family to labor for life on state land, according to the decision of the court." Military expeditions continued to reduce Asiatics to slavery, and state-owned slaves (royal laborers) shared in the same status as these Asiatic slaves.

Asiatics could often have Egyptian names but sometimes inscriptions or papyri mentioning them would still apply an ethnic qualification, such as one which mentions an "Asiatic Aduna and her son Ankhu". Both Asiatics and state-owned slaves could perform a variety of jobs: "We find royal laborers employed as fieldworkers, house servants, and cobblers; female laborers as hairdressers, gardeners, and weavers." If a household servant failed to adequately perform their job, they could be dismissed from the home they worked at. In some cases, servants appear to have become emotionally important to their household as depicted on the Cairo Bowl.

=== Second Intermediate Period and New Kingdom ===
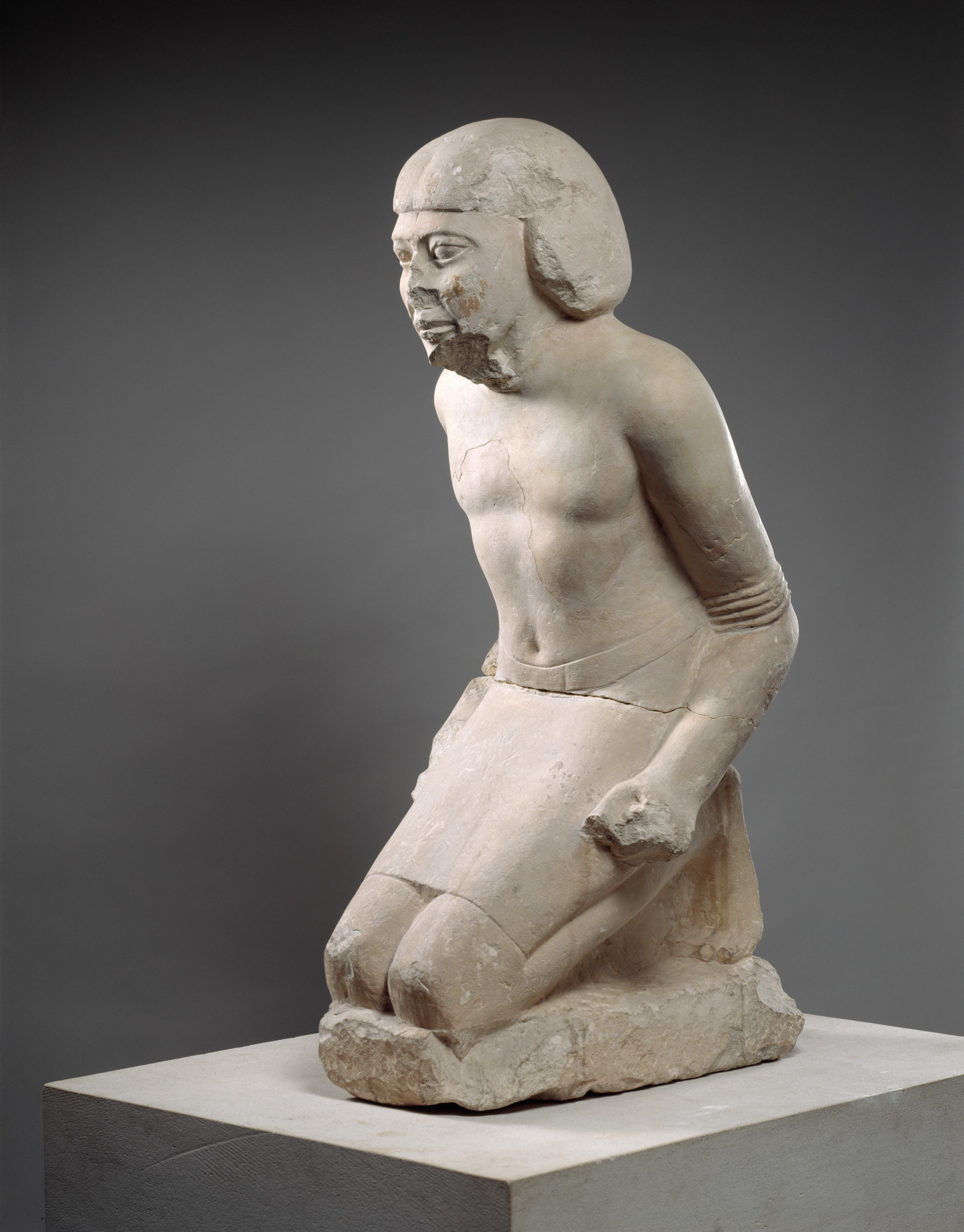
A statue of a kneeling captive in Ancient Egypt, Old Kingdom ca. 2246-2152 a. C

A mummy's soles depicting two Asian prisoners. Between 722 and 332 BC, Late Period of ancient Egypt. Museo Egizio, Turin.

One of the Berlin papyri show that by the time of the Second Intermediate Period, a slave could be owned by both an elite individual (like the king) and a community. In addition, the community had grown in power and now held the capacity to own and administer to public property, including that of slaves, replacing some of the traditional power of the king and his private royal laborers. By this period, slaves could also sometimes become citizens. One method by which this could happen was through marriage.

During the New Kingdom period, the military and its expenses grew and so additional coerced labor was needed to sustain it. As such, the "New Kingdom, with its relentless military operations, is the epoch of large-scale foreign slavery". Many more slaves were also acquired via the Mediterranean slave market, where Egypt was the main purchaser of international slaves. This Mediterranean market appears to have been controlled by Asiatic Bedouin who would capture individuals, such as travelers, and sell them on the market.

The tomb of Ahmose I contains a biographical text which depicts several boasts regarding the capture of foreign Asiatic slaves. Egyptian servants were treated more humanely as employees, whereas foreign slaves were the objects of trade. The foreigners captured during military campaigns are, for example, referred to in the Annals of Thutmose III as "men in captivity" and individuals were referred to as "dependents" (mrj). In reward for his services in the construction of temples across Egypt, Thutmose III rewarded his official Minmose over 150 "dependents".

During and after the reign of Amenhotep II, coerced temple labor was only performed by male and female slaves. At Medinet Habu, defeated Sea Peoples are recorded as having been captured as prisoners of war and reduced to slavery. During this period, slaves could sometimes be rented. One manuscript known as Papyrus Harris I records Ramses III claiming to have captured innumerable foreign slaves:

"I brought back in great numbers those that my sword has spared, with their hands tied behind their backs before my horses, and their wives and children in tens of thousands, and their livestock in hundreds of thousands. I imprisoned their leaders in fortresses bearing my name, and I added to them chief archers and tribal chiefs, branded and enslaved, tattooed with my name, their wives and children being treated in the same way."

In the Adoption Papyrus, the term "slave"/"servant" is contrasted with the term "free citizen (nmhj) of the land of the pharaoh". Often, the phrase nmhj traditionally refers to an orphan or poor. Methods by which slaves could attain their freedom included marriage or entering temple service (being "purified"). The latter is depicted in, for example, the Restoration Stela of Tutankhamen. Ramesside Egypt saw a development in the institution of slavery where slaves could now become objects of private (rather than just public) property, and they could be bought and sold. Slaves themselves could now own some property and had a few legal protections, although they were not many.

=== Ptolemaic Kingdom ===
Slavery in Ptolemaic Egypt was supplied through warfare, purchase, debt enslavement, and birth, though the latter was likely limited. The Zenon papyri indicate that slaves were primarily imported from Syria and Israel, particularly coastal cities such as Tyre and Gaza, which hosted active slave markets. The widespread capture and sale of free Syrians into slavery led Ptolemy II Philadelphus to issue a decree addressing the practice, highlighting its scale and persistence. Prices varied widely in the 3rd century BCE, ranging from about 50 to 300 drachmas for female slaves and roughly 112 to 150 drachmas for males, with higher values in major markets such as Alexandria. The state imposed taxes on slave imports, sales, and manumissions, but there is no clear evidence of a general ownership tax. Slaves could be transferred as debt payments, were carefully described for identification in transactions, and runaway slaves were actively pursued, often with rewards offered for their capture.

=== Roman Egypt ===
Much of what is known about slavery in Roman Egypt comes from papyri documenting slave sales, ownership, and legal disputes. Slave transactions were formally regulated, often including taxes, and guarantees against defects. Buyers and sellers were typically drawn from wealthier urban groups. Although slavery was an established institution, modern scholarship stresses that it coexisted with extensive free labor and should not be viewed as the dominant form of economic production in Roman Egypt.

According to the Periplus of the Erythraean Sea, an anonymous work written at around 60CE, the city of Opone on the Somali coast supplied Roman Egypt with "better-quality slaves, the greater number of which go to Egypt." According to the ancient writer Ptolemy:

"Besides aromatics, slaves of a superior description are exported from Opone, chiefly for the Egyptian markets."

A Roman document from the 6th century CE details the sale of a 12 year old Ethiopian slave-girl named Maura for 4 solidi in Hermopolis Magna.

=== Slaves from the Land of Punt ===
The Land of Punt maintained long-standing trade relations with Ancient Egypt in which a variety of goods were exchanged, including enslaved people. Pharaoh Djedkare is known to have kept a Congoid (pygmy) slave acquired through Punt at his court for entertainment, the young Pharaoh Pepi II was likewise intrigued by another Congoid slave procured through Punt.

== Types of coerced labor ==
=== Chattel slavery ===
The Chattel slaves were mostly captives of war and were brought to different cities and countries to be sold as slaves. All captives, including civilians not a part of the military forces, were seen as a royal resource. The pharaoh could resettle captives by moving them into colonies for labor, giving them to temples, giving them as rewards to deserving individuals, or giving them to his soldiers as loot. Some chattel slaves began as free people who were found guilty of committing illicit acts and were forced to give up their freedom. Other chattel slaves were born into the life from a slave mother.

=== Bonded laborers ===
Ancient Egyptians were able to sell themselves and children into slavery in a form of bonded labor. Self-sale into servitude was not always a choice made by the individuals' free will, but rather a result of individuals who were unable to pay off their debts. The creditor would wipe the debt by acquiring the individual who was in debt as a slave, along with his children and wife. The debtor would also have to give up all that was owned. Peasants were also able to sell themselves into slavery for food or shelter.

Some slaves were bought in slave markets near the Asiatic area and then bonded as war prisoners. Not all were from foreign areas outside of Egypt but it was popular for slaves to be found and collected abroad. This act of slavery increased Egypt's military status and strength. Bonded laborers dreamed of emancipation but never knew if it was ever achievable. Slaves foreign to Egypt had possibilities of return to homelands but those brought from Nubia and Libya were forced to stay in the boundaries of Egypt.

==== The term "Shabti" ====
One type of slavery in ancient Egypt granted captives the promise of an afterlife. Ushabtis were funerary figures buried with deceased Egyptians. Historians have concluded these figures represent an ideology of earthly persons' loyalty and bond to a master. Evidence of ushabtis shows great relevance to a slavery-type system. The captives were promised an afterlife in the beyond if they obeyed a master and served as a laborer. The origin of this type of slavery is difficult to pinpoint but some say the slaves were willing to be held captive in return for entrance into Egypt. Entrance into Egypt could also be perceived as having been given "life". Willingness of enslavement is known as self-sale.

Others suggest that shabtis were held captive because they were foreigners. The full extent of the origins of shabtis is unclear but historians do recognize that women were paid or compensated in some way for their labor whilst men were not. However payment could come in many forms. Although men did not receive monetary wages, shabtis were promised life in the netherworld and that promise could be perceived as payment for them. So Shabtis are associated with bonded labor but historians speculate that there was some sort of choice for the Shabtis.

In the slave market, bonded laborers were commonly sold with a 'slave yoke' or a 'taming stick' to show that the slave was troublesome. This specific type of weaponry to torture the slave has many local names in Egyptian documents but the preferred term is 'sheyba'. Other forms of restraint used in Ancient Egypt slave markets were more common than the shebya, such as ropes and cords.

=== Forced labor ===
Several departments in the Ancient Egyptian government were able to draft workers from the general population to work for the state with a corvée labor system. The laborers were conscripted for projects such as military expeditions, mining and quarrying, and construction projects for the state. These slaves were paid a wage, depending on their skill level and social status for their work. Conscripted workers were not owned by individuals, like other slaves, but rather required to perform labor as a duty to the state. Conscripted labor was a form of taxation by government officials and usually happened at the local level when high officials called upon small village leaders.

== Masters ==
Masters of Ancient Egypt were under obligations when owning slaves. Masters were allowed to utilize the abilities of their slaves by employing them in different manners including domestic services (cooks, maids, brewers, nannies, etc.) and labor services (gardeners, stable hands, field hands, etc.). Masters also had the right to force the slave to learn a trade or craft to make the slave more valuable. Masters were forbidden to force child slaves to harsh physical labor.

== Economy ==
Ancient Egypt was a peasant-based economy and it was not until the Greco-Roman period that slavery had a greater impact. Slave dealing in Ancient Egypt was done through private dealers and not through a public market. The transaction had to be performed before a local council or officials with a document containing clauses that were used in other valuable sales. However Pharaohs were able to bypass this, and possessed the power to give slaves to any they saw fit, usually being a vizier or noble.

== Slave life ==
Many slaves who worked for temple estates lived under punitive conditions, but on average the Ancient Egyptian slave led a life similar to a serf. They were capable of negotiating transactions and owning personal property. Chattel and debt slaves were given food but probably not given wages.

Egyptian slaves, specifically during the New Kingdom era, originated from foreign lands. The slaves themselves were seen as an accomplishment to Egyptian kings' reign, and a sign of power. Slaves or bak were seen as property or a commodity to be bought and sold. Their human qualities were disregarded and were merely seen as property to be used for a master's labor. Unlike the more modern term, "serf", Egyptian slaves were not tied to the land; the owner(s) could use the slave for various occupational purposes. The slaves could serve towards the productivity of the region and community. Slaves were generally men, but women and families could be forced into the owner's household service.

The fluidity of a slave's occupation does not translate to "freedom". It is difficult to use the word 'free' as a term to describe slave's political or social independence due to the lack of sources and material from this ancient time period. Much of the research conducted on Egyptian enslavement has focused on the issue of payment to slaves. Masters did not commonly pay their slaves a regular wage for their service or loyalty. The slaves worked so that they could either enter Egypt and hope for a better life, receive compensation of living quarters and food, or be granted admittance to work in the afterlife. Although slaves were not "free" or rightfully independent, slaves in the New Kingdom were able to leave their master if they had a "justifiable grievance". Historians have read documents about situations where this could be a possibility but it is still uncertain if independence from slavery was attainable. Documentary evidence of escape from slavery is virtually nonexistent before the Ptolemaic Period.

=== Great Pyramids not built by slaves ===
There is a consensus among Egyptologists that the Great Pyramids were not built by slaves. According to noted archeologists Mark Lehner and Zahi Hawass, the pyramids were not built by slaves; Hawass's archeological discoveries in the 1990s in Cairo show the workers were paid laborers rather than slaves. Rather it was farmers who built the pyramids during flooding, when they could not work their lands.

The construction of the pyramids does not appear in the biblical story. The allegation that Israelite slaves built the pyramids was first made by Jewish historian Josephus in Antiquities of the Jews during the first century CE, an account that was subsequently popularized during the Renaissance period. Whilst the idea that the Israelites served as slaves in Egypt features in the Bible, scholars generally agree that the story constitutes an origin myth rather than a historical reality. But the fact that the Bible's depiction of Israelite servitude accords with what it is known about slavery in ancient Egypt has convinced some scholars that the story probably has some historical basis. On the other hand, scholars have noticed that several biblical traditions recall Israel's time in Egypt without reference to slavery and oppression: Ezekiel 20, for example, presents Egypt as the place where God revealed himself to Israel without mentioning slavery, Deuteronomy 23:8 recalls the Egyptians as hosts rather than oppressors, and laws such as Deuteronomy 10:19 and Leviticus 19:34 speak to Israel as sojourners in Egypt, using this memory as the basis for the commandment to love the foreigners residing among them. Other texts even depict Egypt nostalgically, with the people recalling its abundant food (Exod. 16:3; Num. 11:4–5) or describing it as "a land flowing with milk and honey" (Num. 16:13). According to Gili Kugler, such passages preserve alternative traditions in which slavery was absent, suggesting that the motif was introduced gradually into the exodus story as it developed within Israel's cultural memory. The consensus of modern archeologists is that early Israelites were indigenous to Canaan, and if the exodus narrative has any historical basis, it would only account for a small segment of the Israelite population. In their 2001 book, The Bible Unearthed, Archeologists Israel Finkelstein and Neil Asher Silberman wrote, "It is impossible to say whether or not the biblical narrative was an expansion and elaboration of vague memories of the immigration of Canaanites to Egypt and their expulsion from the delta in the second millennium BCE."

Finkelstein expanded on this point in a 2003 interview, saying:

There is no evidence that the Israelites were in Egypt, not the slightest, not the least bit of evidence. There are no clues, either archaeological or historical, to prove that the Israelites built monuments in Egypt, even though the biblical description of the famine in the Land of Israel may be accurate. We know from archaeology that there was a migration of Canaanites to Egypt in the first half of the second millennium BCE, that these migrants built communities in the area of the Nile Delta, and that the Egyptians afterward expelled them from there. Perhaps that is the ancient memory, I don't know. What I can say is that the story, in the form we have it, serves a later situation. It spoke to the exiles in Babylon and to those who returned from the exile. What the story told them is that exile is not the end of the world, it's possible to return, the deserts can be crossed, the land can be reconquered. That gave them hope.

== See also ==
- Slavery in the Bible
