= Papyrus Berlin 17213 =

Papyrus Berlin 17213 (also Rahlfs 995) is Koine Greek fragment of the Septuagint dated to the 3rd century CE.

== Description ==
This is written in papyrus in codex form. P. Berlin 17213 contains fragments of Genesis 19, 11–13, 17–19. Contains a blank space for the name of God apparently, although Emanuel Tov thinks that it is a free space ending paragraph. This fragment is also referred to as number 995 on the list of the manuscripts of the Septuagint according to the classification of Alfred Rahlfs.

== History ==
This manuscript was published by K. Treu, Neue Berliner Septuagintafragmente (New fragment of the Septuaginta of Berlin), APF 20, 1970, pp. 46, 47. It is now stored in the Berlin Papyrus Collection of the Egyptian Museum of Berlin (Papyrus Berlin 17213).

== Bibliography ==
- Ägyptisches Museum und Papyrussammlung. "P. 17213: Septuaginta, Genesis 19, 11–13, 17–19". Berliner Papyrusdatenbank (in German).
- "AfP 20 (1970), p. 46-47 (Treu, Kurt)". Leuven Database of Ancient Books.
