= Papyrus Berlin 11529 =

- Berlin Papyrus Collection
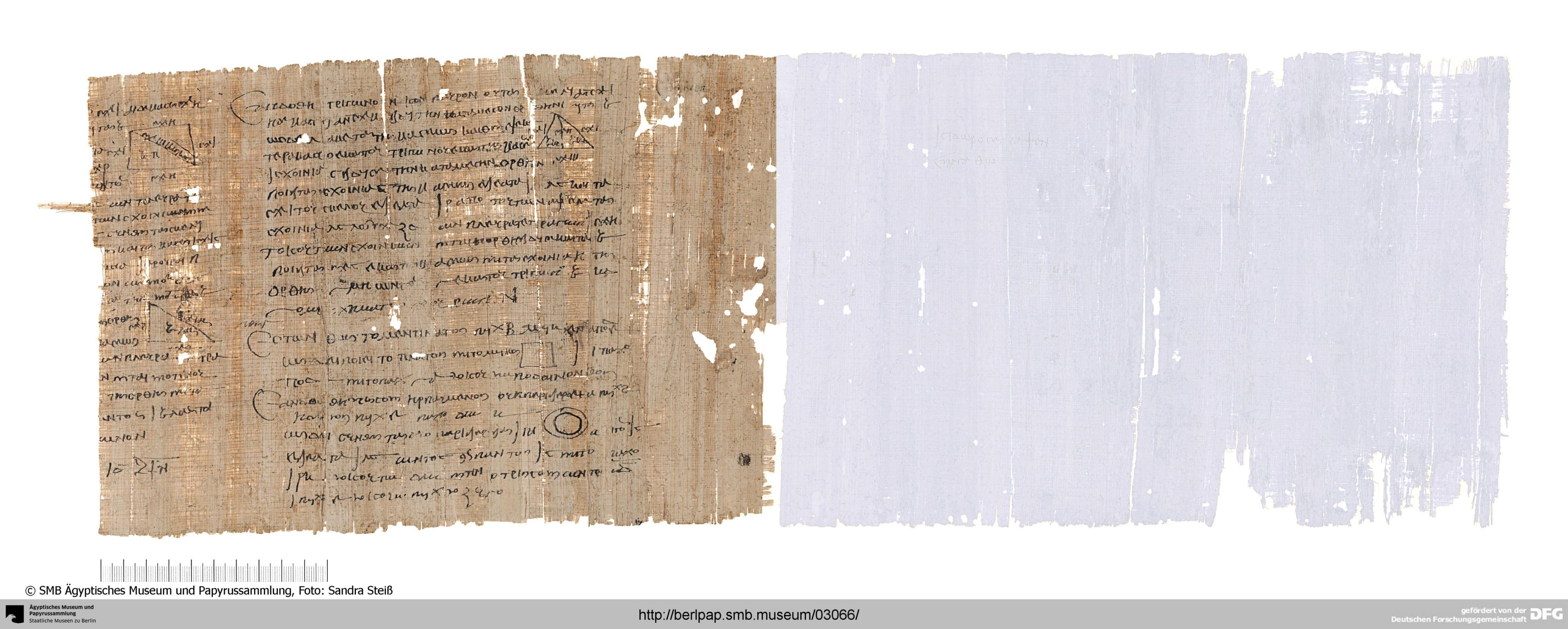
- Verso side of Papyrus Berlin 11529
- Accession: 11529

Papyrus Berlin 11529 is a fragment of 2nd century papyrus manuscript containing on its verso side an unidentified Greek mathematical text and is one of the oldest extant illustrated Greek papyrus roll fragments.

One side of the fragment contains a property deed dated 139 AD. The other side contains two columns of text which consists of a series of geometrical and stereometrical propositions. Each proposition is illustrated with a crudely drawn diagram. Several lines of text in each proposition were left shorter than the remainder of the text lines in order to leave space in the right of the column for the illustrations. The left column has a parallelogram, and two right-angled triangles, while the right has an equilateral triangle, a stone, and two concentric circles.
