= Publius Canidius Crassus =

1st century BC Roman general and consul

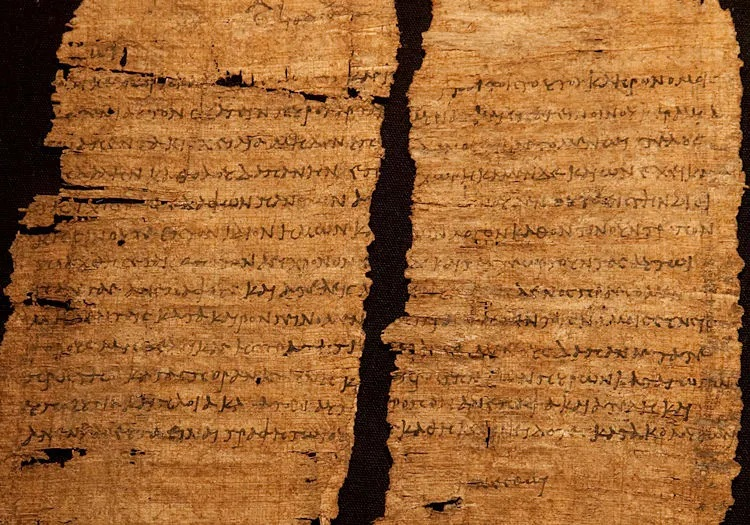
Papyrus Bingen 45, dated 23 February 33 BC, possibly granted Crassus tax exemptions in Ptolemaic Egypt

Publius Canidius Crassus (died 30 BC) was a Roman general and Mark Antony's lieutenant. He served under Lepidus in southern Gallia in 43 BC, and was henceforth allied with Antony. He became suffect consul in 40 BC and then served as a commander in Armenia whence he invaded, in 36 BC, Iberia (Georgia), and forced its king Pharnabazus into alliance against Zober, king of Albania. Having subjugated the Iberians and Albanians, Crassus then joined Antony's campaign against Parthia.

In the Battle of Actium in 31 BC, he commanded Antony's land forces against Octavian, having advised Antony before the battle that it would be more advantageous for their forces, together with those of Cleopatra, to fight on land, where they would have had the advantage over those of Octavian.

After Antony's defeat and flight to Egypt, Crassus was accused of deserting his army. He went to Egypt, where he was executed on Octavian's order.

== See also ==
- Canidia (gens)
- Papyrus Bingen 45, an ancient Egyptian document which may relate to Crassus

Political offices
Preceded by Gnaeus Domitius Calvinus and Gaius Asinius Pollio	Consul of the Roman Republic with Lucius Cornelius Balbus; 40 BC	Succeeded by Lucius Marcius Censorinus and Gaius Calvisius Sabinus
