= Abusir el-Meleq =

Archaeological site in Egypt

Abusir el-Meleq (Ar. أبو صير الملق), also Abusir el-Melek - a town and archaeological site in Egypt, located in Beni Suef (Arabic: بني سويف, romanized: Baniswēf), which is the capital city of the Beni Suef Governorate in Egypt, an important agricultural trade centre on the west bank of the Nile River. Abusir el-Meleq is located 114 km (70.8 miles) south of Cairo. It is home to the Necropolis of Abusir el-Meleq which was the main necropolis for Herakleopolis in the first Millenium BC. Of the many burials discovered here, 151 mummies were used in a 2017 DNA study comparing the mtDNA of Ancient Egyptians and modern Egyptians.

== History ==
The archaeological site Abusir el-Meleq was occupied from at least 3250BCE until about 700CE. It had an active cult to Osiris and is the burial place of many singers and priests Herischef, whose cult center was in Herakleopolis Magna, 20 km away. By the third century BCE Abusir el-Meleq was part of the northern side of the Herakleopolites nome, and had agricultural connections with the Fayum and the Memphite provinces involving cattle-breeding, transporting wheat, and bee-keeping. In the early Roman Period, the site may have been its own district.

The necropolis of Abusir el-Meleq is located north of the Fayum entrance. There are several large tombs in the area with findings dating from the Preydynastic Period to the Islamic Period. A significant section of the Necropolis has a Roman-era cemetery from the 1st -2nd century CE that is unique to the area and not documented anywhere else in Egypt.

In the Roman Period, many non-Egyptian veterans of the Roman army settled in the Fayum area after completing their service and intermarried with the community. There is more evidence of foreigners living in the area as there were people with Greek, Hebrew, or Latin names living there. Greek portraiture was found in the cemetery and Greek statuary was adapted to suit Egyptian burial practices.

== Otto Rubensohn's Excavations ==
Otto Rubensohn was a German Archeologist that discovered the Necropolis of Abusir el-Meleq. He conducted 4 excavation campaigns between 1902 and 1905 in the area. Rubensohn carried out various excavations in Egypt for the Egyptian Museum of Berlin with the main goal of finding papyri; however, his excavations in Abusir el-Meleq also uncovered complete grave furnishings and more than 345 graves with over 700 burials. Despite the many material findings, they are mostly unpublished and 400 individual objects are in Berlin along with another 200 that were distributed to various collections of the then German Empire.

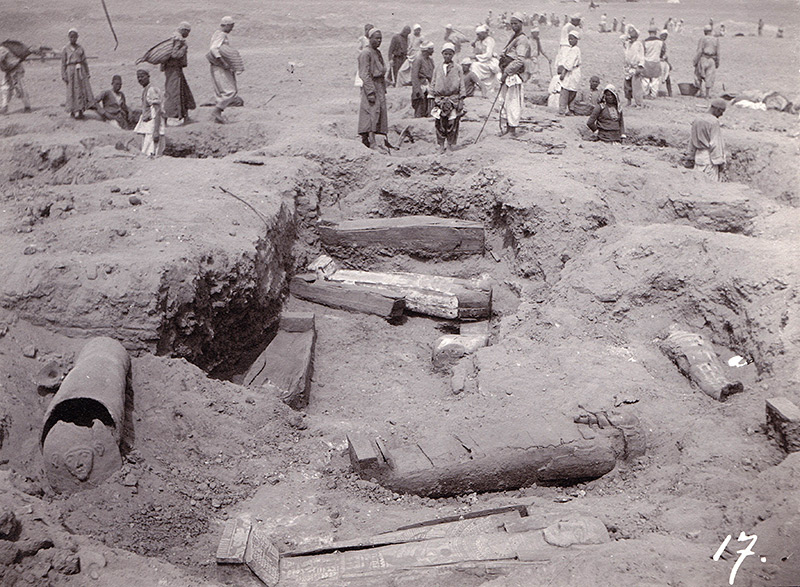
Excavation site at Abusir el-Meleq, 1903

The oldest graves were from the Naqada period (4000-3000 BCE), the later ones were used in Greek period, Roman and from the time of Arab rule (641 CE). Objects from the Third Intermediate Period to the Greco-Roman period make up most of the material findings.

=== Findings ===
The burial of a young girl named Tadja was found in Abusir el-Meleq and was a very well preserved and complete grave compared to the others in the area. Almost 60 individual objects were found in her grave alone. In addition to inner and outer coffins, these include finger rings, amulets, musical instruments, headrests, faience vessels and small female and male sculptures dating from the period of the 25-26th Dynasty.

The coffin of Somtus was found in 1904 alongside 4 other coffins belonging to his family members. Rubensohn numbered the coffins 1 through 5 in his diary; Somtus' wife Ibet was in coffin 1, His daughter's son Horwedja was in coffin 2, Somtus himself was in coffin 3, His daughter Khnemet was in coffin 4, and his son Horwedja was in coffin 5. There were two funerary objects found at the head of Somtus' tomb: an empty canopic chest with a falcon statuette with two feathers on the top and a wooden figure of Ptah-Sokar-Osiris. The sarcophagi were made of rounded limestone and contained wooden coffins, common for the Ptolemaic Period, except for the 4th one which was only the wooden coffin.

== Georg Möller's Excavations ==
The German Oriental Society organized an expedition led by the Egyptologist Georg Möller that took place in 1905 and 1906. The excavations uncovered approximately 150 graves in the southern part of the cemetery. The excavation squares were not systematically arranged, rather each newly dug square would receive the next number in the plan sketches. Some of the graves consisted of shallow round pits with little to no funerary goods, these graves were mainly for children. There was also evidence of Nubians being buried according to Nubian traditions with Nubian Products like black rimmed clay bowls and an alabaster vanity panel.

== Study ==
=== 2017 DNA study ===
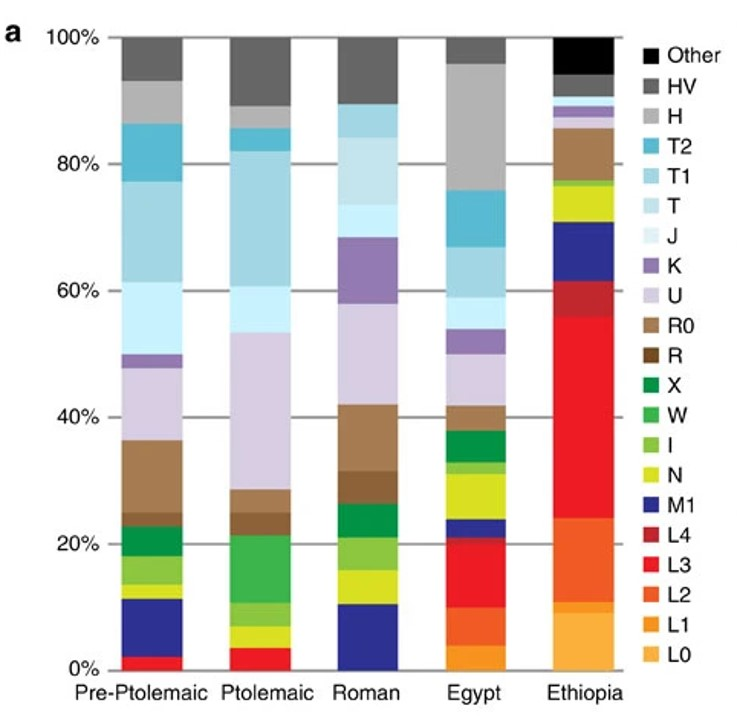
Maternal ancestry variation in Egyptians and Ethiopians.

A study published in 2017 by Schuenemann et al. extracted DNA from 151 Egyptian mummies, whose remains were recovered from Abusir el-Meleq in Middle Egypt. The samples are from the time periods: Late New Kingdom, Ptolemaic, and Roman. Complete mtDNA sequences from 90 samples as well as genome-wide data from three ancient Egyptian individuals were successfully obtained and were compared with other ancient and modern datasets. The study used 135 modern Egyptian samples. The ancient Egyptian individuals in their own dataset possessed highly similar mtDNA haplogroup profiles, and cluster together, supporting genetic continuity across the 1,300-year transect. Modern Egyptians shared this mtDNA haplogroup profile, but also carried 8% more African component. A wide range of mtDNA haplogroups were found including clades of J, U, H, HV, M, R0, R2, K, T, L, I, N, X and W. The three ancient Egyptian individuals were analysed for Y-DNA, two were assigned to West Asian haplogroup J and one to haplogroup E1b1b1 both are carried by modern Egyptians, and also common among Afroasiatic speakers in Northern Africa, Eastern Africa and the Middle East. The researchers cautioned that the examined ancient Egyptian specimens may not be representative of those of all ancient Egyptians since they were from a single archaeological site from the northern part of Egypt. The analyses revealed higher affinities with Near Eastern and European populations compared to modern Egyptians, likely due to the 8% increase in the African component. However, comparative data from a contemporary population under Roman rule in Anatolia, did not reveal a closer relationship to the ancient Egyptians from the Roman period. "Genetic continuity between ancient and modern Egyptians cannot be ruled out despite this more recent sub-Saharan African influx, while continuity with modern Ethiopians is not supported".

The absolute estimates of sub-Saharan African ancestry in these three ancient Egyptian individuals ranged from 6 to 15%, and the absolute estimates of sub-Saharan African ancestry in the 135 modern Egyptian samples ranged from 14 to 21%, which show an 8% increase in African component. The age of the ancient Egyptian samples suggests that this 8% increase in African component occurred predominantly within the last 2000 years. The 135 modern Egyptian samples were: 100 from modern Egyptians taken from a study by Pagani et al., and 35 from el-Hayez Western Desert Oasis taken from a study by Kujanova et al. The 35 samples from el-Hayez Western Desert Oasis, whose population is described by the Kujanova et al. study as a mixed, relatively isolated, demographically small but autochthonous population, were already known from that study to have a relatively high sub-Saharan African component, which is more than 11% higher than the African component in the 100 modern Egyptian samples.

Verena Schuenemann and the authors of this study suggest a high level of genetic interaction with the Near East since ancient times, probably going back to Prehistoric Egypt although the oldest mummies at the site were from the New Kingdom: "Our data seem to indicate close admixture and affinity at a much earlier date, which is unsurprising given the long and complex connections between Egypt and the Middle East. These connections date back to Prehistory and occurred at a variety of scales, including overland and maritime commerce, diplomacy, immigration, invasion and deportation"

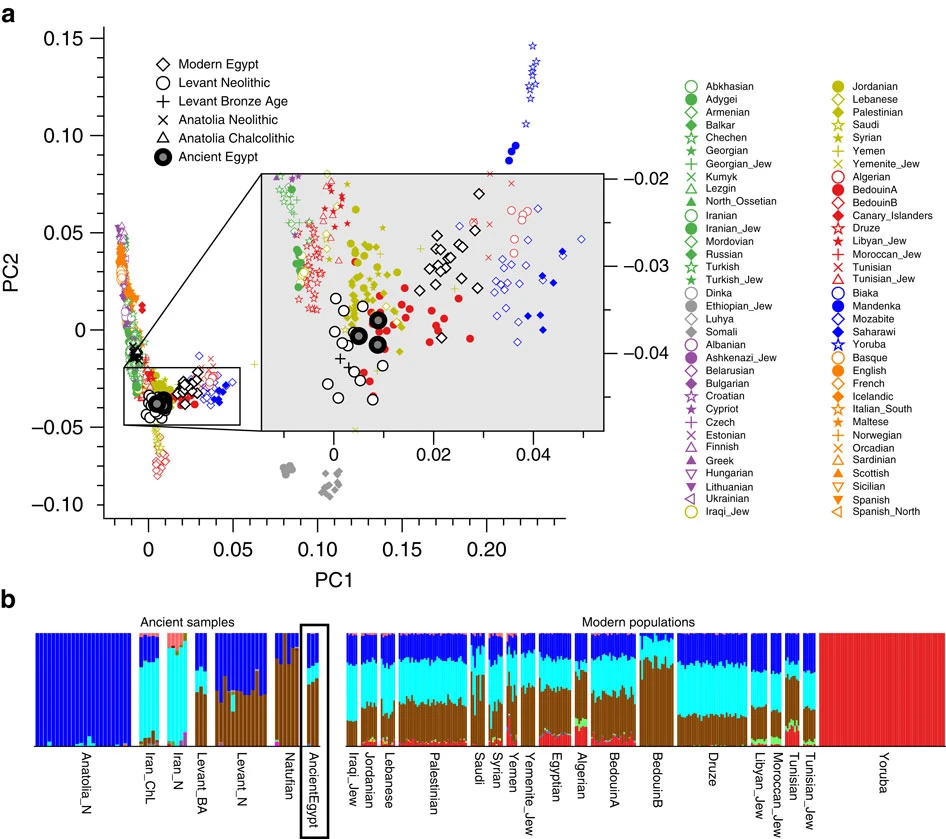
PCA and ADMIXTURE analysis of three ancient Egyptian samples and other modern and ancient populations.

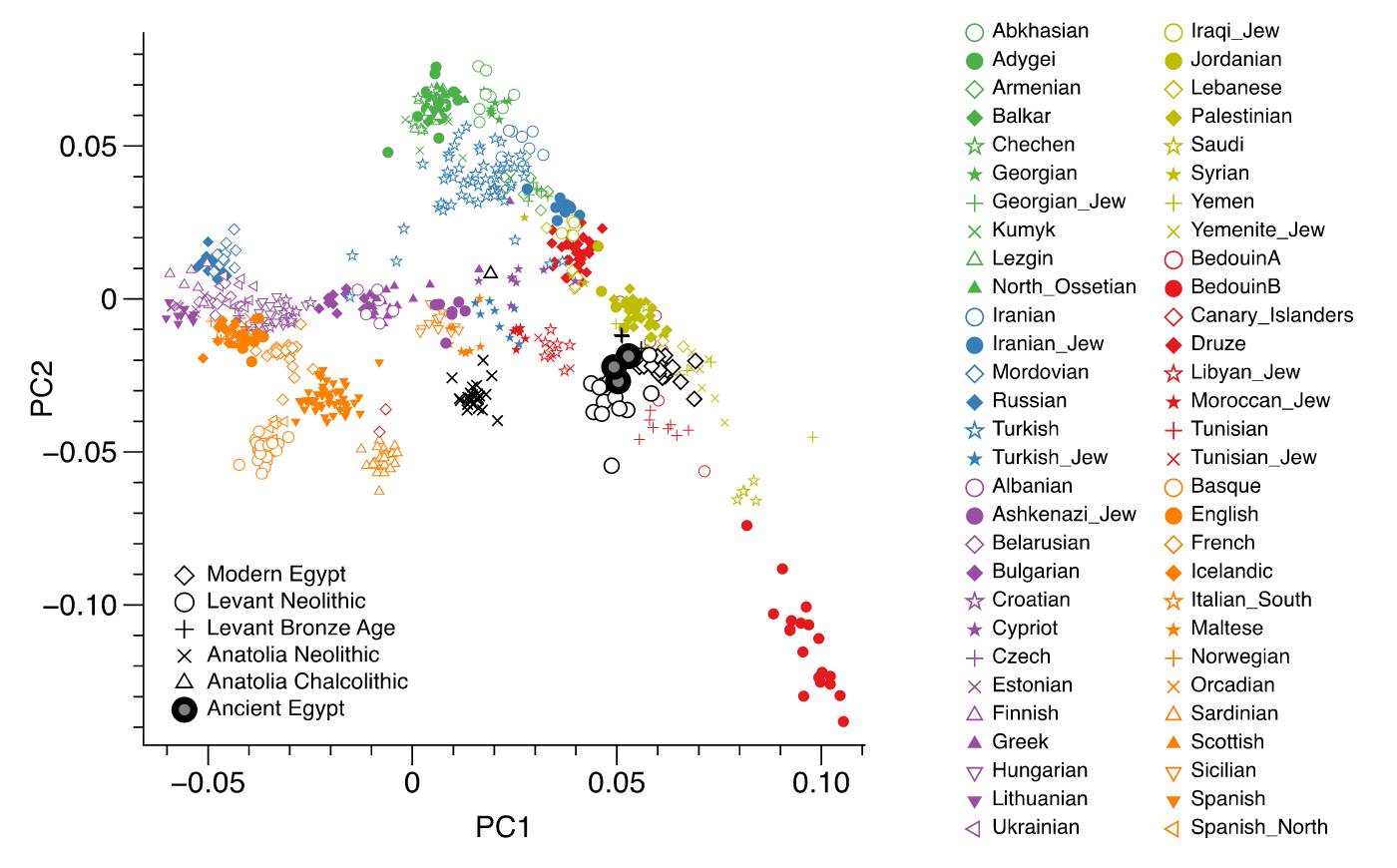
PCA using only European samples based on the nuclear genome-wide data obtained on three ancient Egyptian samples.

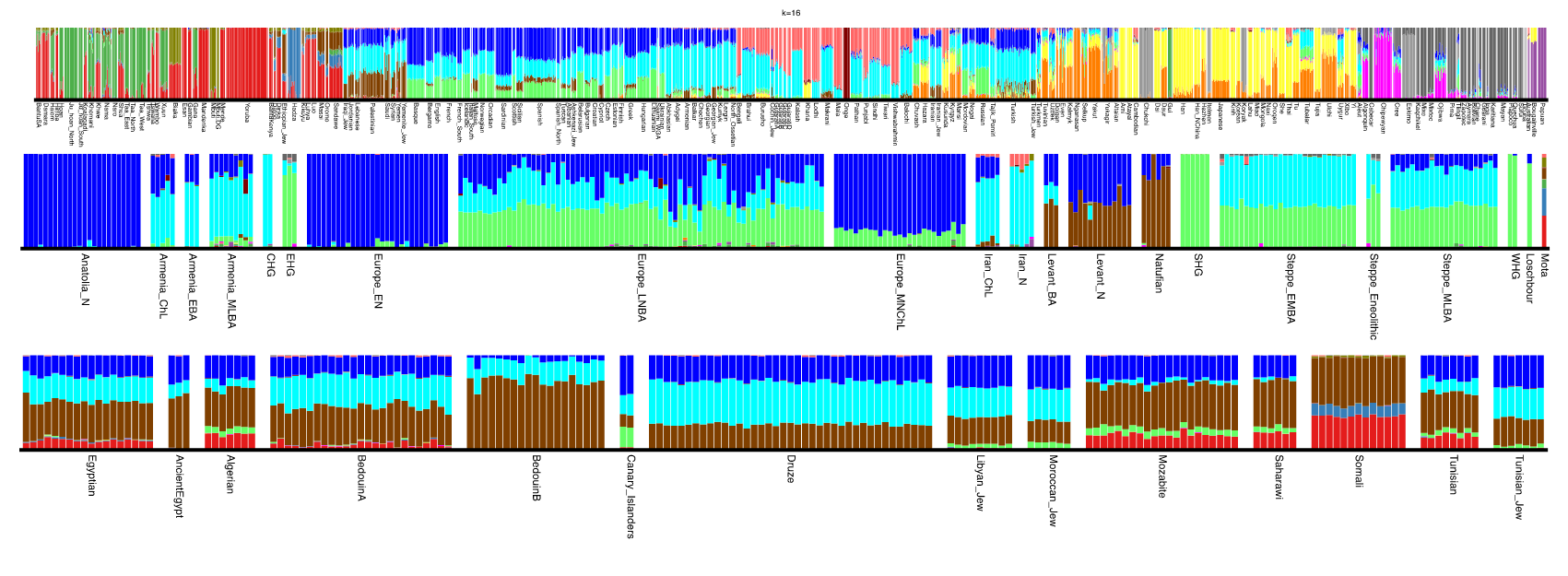
Complete results from the ADMIXTURE analysis using all samples in the merged data set, from the 2017 study by Schuenemann et al.

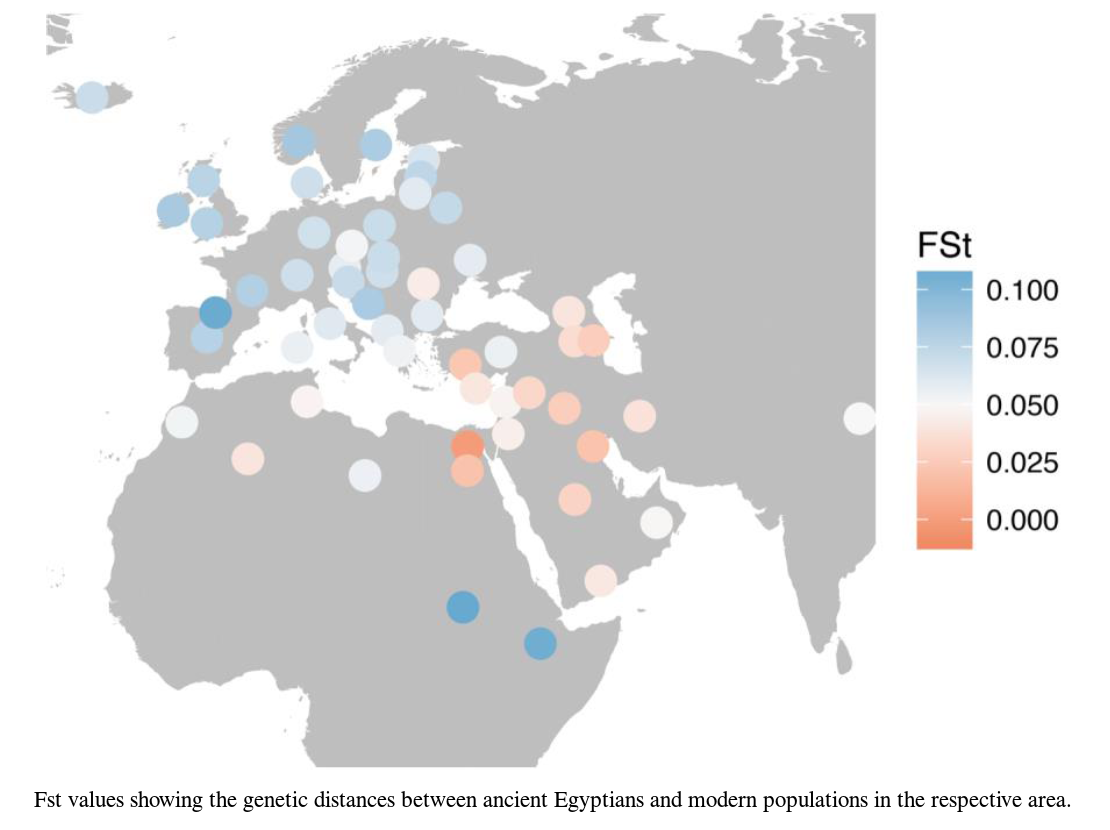
F_{ST} values showing the genetic distances of HVR-1 (mtDNA) between 90 ancient Egyptians and modern populations. Blue values depict higher genetic distances, red values depict lower genetic distances between the ancient Egyptian population and modern populations in the respective area.

==== Criticisms of the 2017 DNA study ====
The 2017 study has generated academic responses from scholars from other related disciplines, remarking on the conclusions of the study from a multi-disciplinary approach.

Gourdine et al. criticised the methodology of the Scheunemann et al. study. They specifically criticised the claim that the increase in the sub-Saharan component in the modern Egyptian samples resulted from the trans-Saharan slave trade (although see below) and claimed that the sub-Saharan "genetic affinities" may be attributed to "early settlers" and "the relevant sub-Saharan genetic markers" do not correspond with the geography of known trade routes".

In 2022, biological anthropologist S.O.Y. Keita argued that there were problems with the study's approaches and conclusions such as overgeneralizations and a failure to consider alternative explanations. Particularly, he raised issues with the comparative samples from West Africa as a proxy group and generalisations about geographical Egypt and population origins from the sample results.

In 2022, archaeologist Danielle Candelora claimed that there were several limitations with the 2017 Scheunemann et al. study such as "new (untested) sampling methods, small sample size and problematic comparative data". Candelora noted that the findings of Scheunemann et al. were based largely on the only three mummies from which genome-wide samples were recovered.

In 2023, Stiebling and Helft acknowledged that the 2017 study had performed the largest study on ancient Egyptians but noted that the findings still derived from a small sample of mummies from one site in Middle Egypt dating to the New Kingdom and later periods. They also stated that this study could not represent earlier populations or Egyptians from Upper Egypt who were geographically closer to Sub-Saharan populations.

In 2023, Christopher Ehret argued that the conclusions of the 2017 study were based on insufficiently small sample sizes, and that the authors had a biased interpretation of the genetic data. Ehret also criticised the study for asserting that there was "no sub-Saharan" component in the Egyptian population. Ehret cited other genetic evidence which had identified the Horn of Africa as a source of a genetic marker "M35 /215" Y-chromosome lineage for a significant population component which moved north from that region into Egypt and the Levant.

UNESCO scholars Augustin Holl and Jean Gourdine both presented similar forms of criticisms, in the General History of Africa Volume IX, of the 2017 Scheunemann study in terms of its geographical coverage, general conclusions on the population of Egypt and methodological approach. Gourdine argued that there were a number of biases in the interpretation and the conclusions conflicted with other analysis such as the Amarna STR analysis, and evidence of identifiable African haplogroups such as E1b1b1, JK2955 (haplogroup L3) and JK2963 (haplogroup M1a1i), which preceded the trans-Saharan slave trade in Egypt.

However other independent studies dated the sub-Saharan admixture in Egypt to 750 years ago and an Old-Kingdom genome lacked such sub-Saharan component. Later peer-reviewed genetic studies supported the findings of Schuenemann et al (2017) and its methods, including studies on a 4000-year old mummy from Upper Egypt and Christian Period Nubia.
