= Papyrus 79 =

Papyrus 𝔓^{79}
- New Testament manuscript
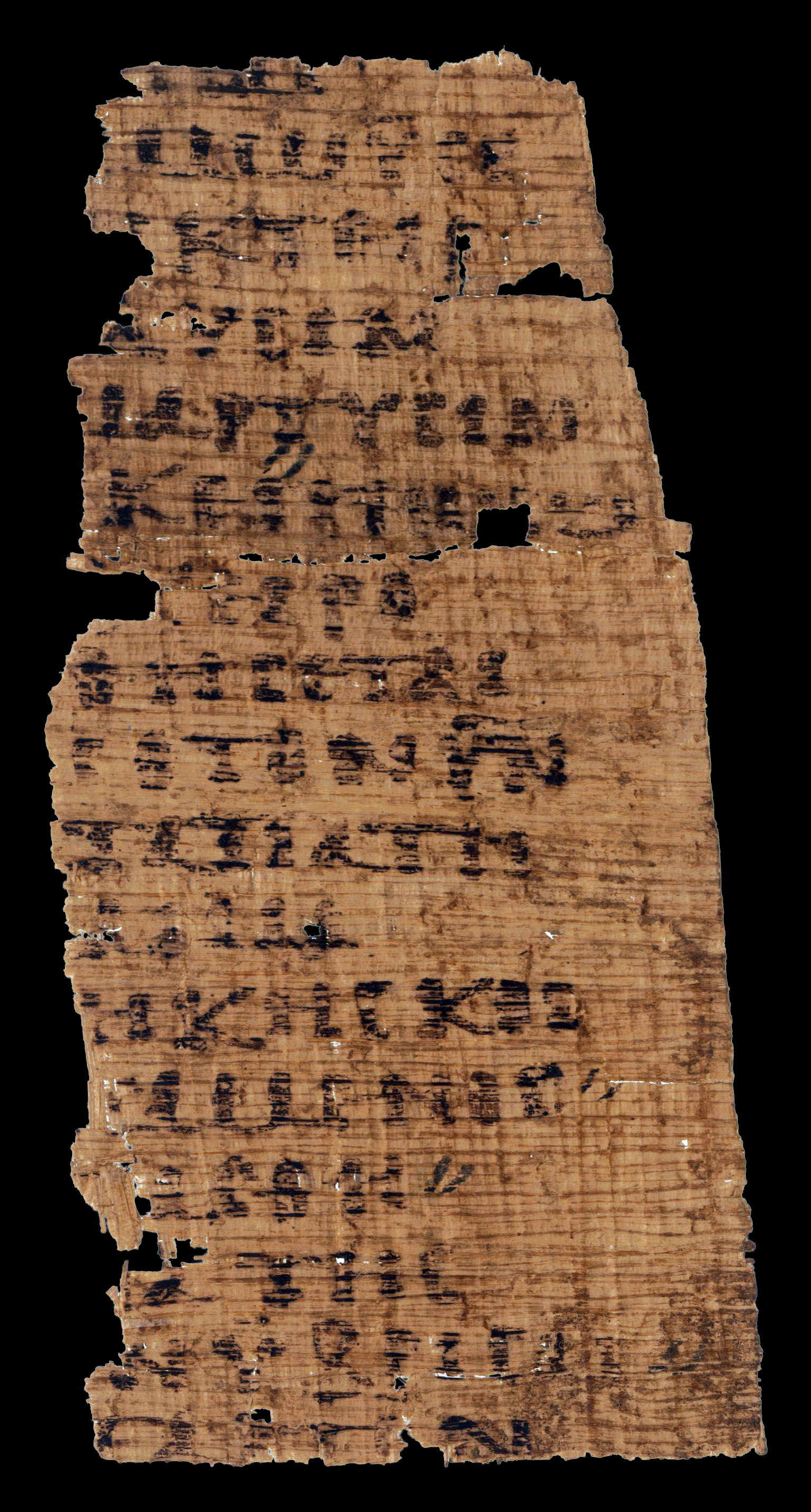
- Recto, Heb 10:28-30
- Text: Epistle to the Hebrews 10 †
- Date: 7th century
- Script: Greek
- Found: Egypt
- Now at: Staatliche Museen zu Berlin
- Cite: K. Treu, Neue neutestamentliche Fragmente der Berliner Papyrussammlung, APF 18 (1966), pp. 37-48.
- Size: 2.9 cm x 5.3 cm
- Type: Alexandrian text-type
- Category: II

Papyrus 79 is a copy of the New Testament in Greek. It is a papyrus manuscript of the Epistle to the Hebrews. It is designated by the siglum 𝔓^{79} in the Gregory-Aland numbering of New Testament manuscripts. The surviving text of Hebrews are verses 10:10-12,28-30.

Using the study of comparative writings styles (palaeography), it has been assigned to the 7th century.

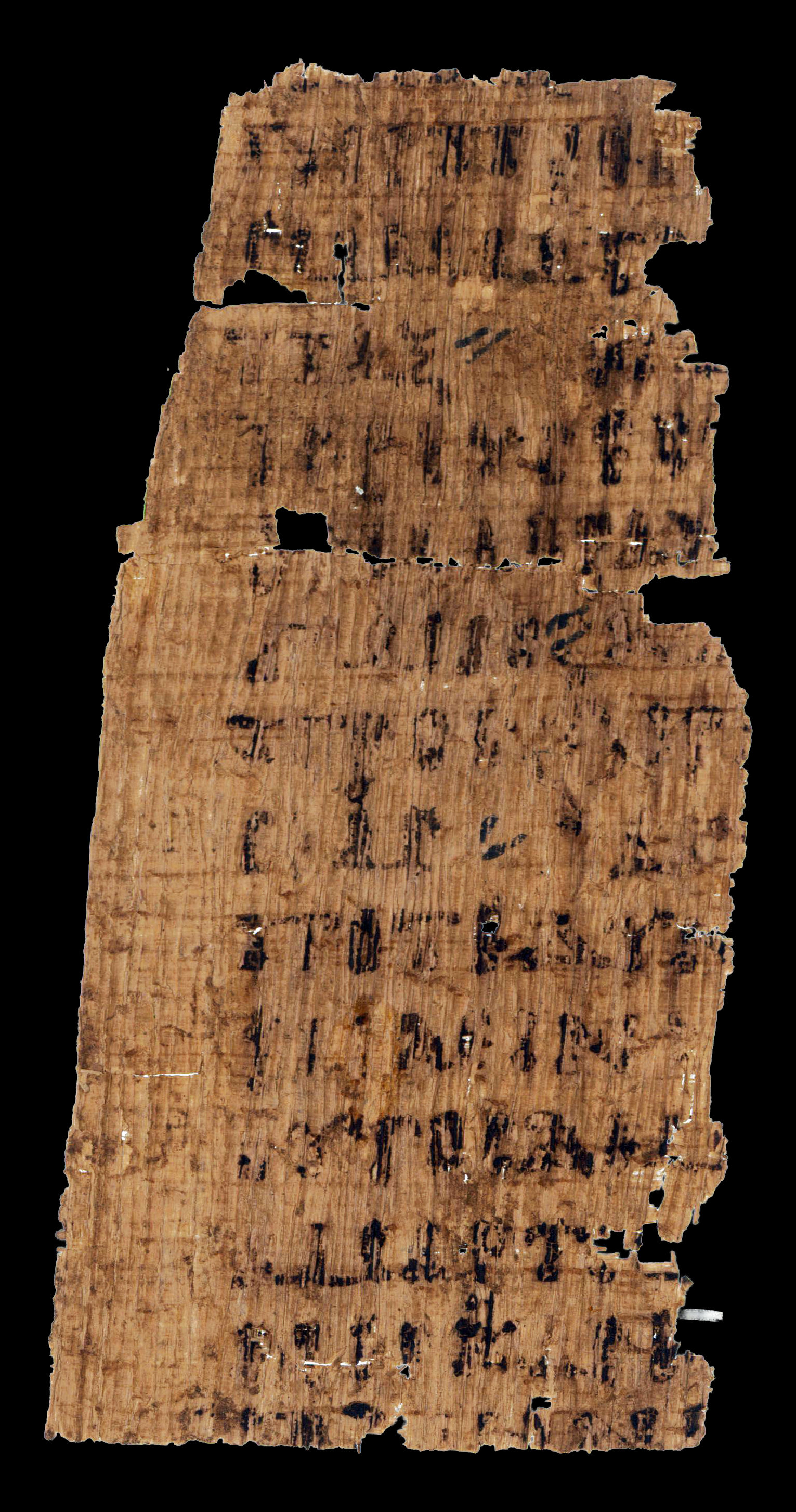
Verso, Hebrews 10:10-12

== Description ==
The manuscript is a codex (precursor to the modern book format), possibly only containing the text of the Epistle to the Hebrews, of which only chapter 10 verses 10-12 and 28-30 have survived in part. The fragment measures 2.9 cm by 5.3 cm. The original page likely measured 26-30cm by 21cm. The text was written in two columns per page, 32 lines in each column, with around 11-15 letters per line. There is a space of 1.5cm between each column. The surviving fragment shows now signs of correction to the text. The letters have a Coptic shape.

Text

The Greek text of this codex is considered to be a representative of the Alexandrian text-type. Biblical scholar and textual critic Kurt Aland placed it in Category II of his New Testament manuscript classification system. Category II manuscripts are described as being manuscripts "of a special quality, i.e., manuscripts with a considerable proportion of the early text, but which are marked by alien influences. These influences are usually of smoother, improved readings, and in later periods by infiltration by the Byzantine text."

Location

It is currently housed at the Staatliche Museen zu Berlin in Germany, and part of the Berlin Papyrus Collection (shelf number Berlin Papyrus 6774).

== See also ==
- List of New Testament papyri

== Images ==
Media related to Papyrus 79 at Wikimedia Commons
