= Otto Rubensohn =

German-Jewish classical archaeologist (1867–1964)

Otto Rubensohn (24 November 1867, Kassel – 9 August 1964, Höchenschwand) was a German-Jewish classical archaeologist.

He received his education at the Universities of Berlin and Strasbourg, Under the supervision of Adolf Michaelis, he earned his doctorate in 1892 with the thesis "Die Mysterienheiligtümer in Eleusis und Samothrake". In 1897–1899 he was associated with the German Archaeological Institute at Athens, and performed excavations of the sanctuaries of Apollo and Asclepius on the island of Paros.

From 1901 to 1907, on behalf of the Prussian Royal Museums of Berlin and the Papyruskommission, he was involved in a number of archaeological excavations in Egypt, which built major parts of the Berlin Papyrus Collection. In 1902–1905 he conducted a series of significant excavations of the necropolis at Abusir el-Meleq. While in Egypt, he also performed excavatory work at Fayum, at Ashmunein and on the island of Elephantine, where he uncovered numerous Aramaic papyri scrolls.

He was later named director of the recently established Pelizaeus Museum in Hildesheim. From 1915 to 1932 he worked as a secondary school teacher in Berlin. In 1939, he emigrated to Switzerland in order to escape Nazi persecution. There he settled in Basel, and at the age of 94 published "Das Delion von Paros", considered to be his most important written effort.

== Selected works ==
- Die Mysterienheiligtümer in Eleusis und Samothrake, 1892 – The mystery sanctuaries in Eleusis and Samothrace.
- Elephantine-Papyri, 1907 (with Wilhelm Schubart; Wilhelm Spiegelberg) – Elephantine papyri.
- Das Grab Alexanders des Grossen in Memphis, 1910 – The grave of Alexander the Great in Memphis.
- Hellenistisches Silbergerät in antiken Gipsabgüssen, 1911 (Pelizaeus-Museum) – Hellenistic silver objects in ancient plaster casts.
- Das Delion von Paros, 1962 – The Delion of Paros.
