= The Egyptian Royal Genealogy Project =

Egyptian Royal Genealogy
- Website type: Historical Research
- Available in: English
- Owner: Chris Bennett
- Creator: Chris Bennett
- Website: www.instonebrewer.com/TyndaleSites/Egypt/ptolemies/ptolemies.htm
- Commercial: No
- Launched: May 2001; 25 years ago
- Current status: Online

The Egyptian Royal Genealogy Project is a research project started by Egyptologist Christopher John "Chris" Bennett in 2001.

== History ==
The internet was meant as the medium for the project, which aimed at discussing new material related to the Ptolemaic dynasty as soon as they appeared, and provide direct access to primary sources for readers, such as inscriptions or papyri. The project was first hosted on the Yahoo! GeoCities with a mirror by Tyndale House. After the closure of GeoCities it became available only at the Tyndale House, which in 2019 moved the material to a sub-website, instonebrewer.com.

Many expressed their hope that the project will find its way to print; the founder, who died on 10 January 2014, stated that although he might think of it, printing is not his aim. The project was praised and recommended by academics, and its entries were cited by many scholars in academic works.

== Selection of academic works citing the project ==
- Jacobus, Helen R. (2015). Zodiac Calendars in the Dead Sea Scrolls and Their Reception: Ancient Astronomy and Astrology in Early Judaism. IJS Studies in Judaica. Vol. 14. Brill. p. 102. ISBN 978-9-004-28406-7. ISSN 1570-1581.
- Penrose Jr., Walter Duvall (2016). Postcolonial Amazons: Female Masculinity and Courage in Ancient Greek and Sanskrit Literature. Oxford University Press. p. 275. ISBN 978-0-191-01950-0.
- Ogden, Daniel (2017). The Legend of Seleucus: Kingship, Narrative and Mythmaking in the Ancient World. Cambridge University Press. p. 250. ISBN 978-1-107-16478-9.
- Van Oppen de Ruiter, Branko F. (2013). "Lagus and Arsinoe: An Exploration of Legendary Royal Bastardy". Historia: Zeitschrift für Alte Geschichte. 62 (1). Franz Steiner Verlag: 80. ISSN 0018-2311.
- Mueller, Katja (2006). Settlements of the Ptolemies: City Foundations and New Settlement in the Hellenistic World. Studia Hellenistica. Vol. 43. Peeters Publishers. p. 10. ISBN 978-9-042-91709-5. ISSN 0779-3448.
- Jacobus, Helen R. (2014). Zodiac Calendars in the Dead Sea Scrolls and Their Reception: Ancient Astronomy and Astrology in Early Judaism. IJS Studies in Judaica: Conference Proceedings of the Institute of Jewish Studies, University College London. Vol. 14. Brill. p. 102. ISBN 978-9-004-28405-0. ISSN 1570-1581.
- Clayman, Dee L. (2014). Berenice II and the Golden Age of Ptolemaic Egypt. Oxford University Press. p. 223. ISBN 978-0-195-37088-1.
- Stern, Sacha (2012). Calendars in Antiquity: Empires, States, and Societies. Oxford University Press. p. 155. ISBN 978-0-191-62622-7.
- Pollini, John (2012). From Republic to Empire: Rhetoric, Religion, and Power in the Visual Culture of Ancient Rome. Oklahoma Series in Classical Culture Series. Vol. 48. University of Oklahoma Press. p. 261. ISBN 978-0-806-18816-4.
