= Chris Bennett (egyptologist) =

British-born American Egyptologist

- Born: March 18, 1953; Manchester, UK
- Died: January 10, 2014 (aged 60); San Diego, California, USA
- Spouse: Anne Jenkins (m. 1996)
- Scientific career
- Fields: Egyptology

Christopher John Bennett (March 18, 1953 - January 10, 2014) was a British-born American Egyptologist who founded The Egyptian Royal Genealogy Project.

== Life ==
Bennett was educated at the Sydney Grammar School (1970), Sydney University (BSc (Hons) 1975), and University College London (PhD (1980) in Computer Science). He married Anne Jenkins in 1996. He died of cancer while serving as a visiting scholar at the University of California, San Diego.

Chris Bennett's website on The Egyptian Royal Genealogy Project was mostly devoted to the Ptolemaic Dynasty. The website is maintained by Tyndale House, which moved its material to a sub-website, Egyptian Royal Genealogy.

== Publications ==
Bennett wrote and published numerous papers on Ancient Egyptian, Ptolemaic and Roman chronology in major journals such as the Journal of the American Research Center in Egypt, Egypt and the Levant and Acta Orientalia.

In 2003, Chris Bennett co-edited and self-published a book titled "A Delta-man in Yebu: Occasional Volume of the Egyptologists Electronic Forum No. 1", and in 2011, he authored a major book titled "Alexandria and the Moon: An Investigation into the Lunar Macedonian Calendar of Ptolemaic Egypt" (Studia Hellenistica 52), published by Peeters Publishers in Leuven.

Finally, in 1996, Chris Bennett published—and later updated—his paper in the Journal of Ancient and Medieval Studies titled "Temporal Fugues" which refuted David Rohl's criticisms of conventional Egyptian chronology which was placed online with permission of 'The Octavian Society' of California, USA.

=== Articles ===
- Bennett, Chris (2006). "Genealogy and chronology of the Second Intermediate Period" (PDF). Egypt and the Levant. 16: 231–243. Archived from the original (PDF) on 2025-07-15.
- Harry Falk and Chris Bennett (2009). "Macedonian Intercalary Months and the Era of Azes". Acta Orientalia . 70: 197–216. ISSN 0001-6438.
- Bennett, Chris (2002). "A Genealogical Chronology of the Seventeenth Dynasty". Journal of the American Research Center in Egypt. 39: 123–155.
- Chris Bennett, Temporal Fugues, Journal of Ancient and Medieval Studies 13 (1996) The link downloads Bennett's article in MS Word format
