= Berliner griechische Urkunden =

Berliner griechische Urkunden (BGU, lit. 'Berlin Greek Documents') is an ongoing publishing program, commenced in 1895 of Ancient Greek documents (mostly papyri) by the Berlin State Museums, primarily from the Berlin Papyrus Collection of the Egyptian Museum of Berlin. The project was originally entitled Ägyptische Urkunden aus den Königlichen Museen zu Berlin; Griechische Urkunden (Royal Museums) but then changed the title to Staatlichen Museen when the museums' status changed. The term "papyrologist" itself was coined in connection with the establishment of the BGU project. The founding editors were Emil Seckel and Wilhelm Schubart.
