= Beauty and cosmetics in ancient Egypt =

Cosmetic and body-care practices in ancient Egypt

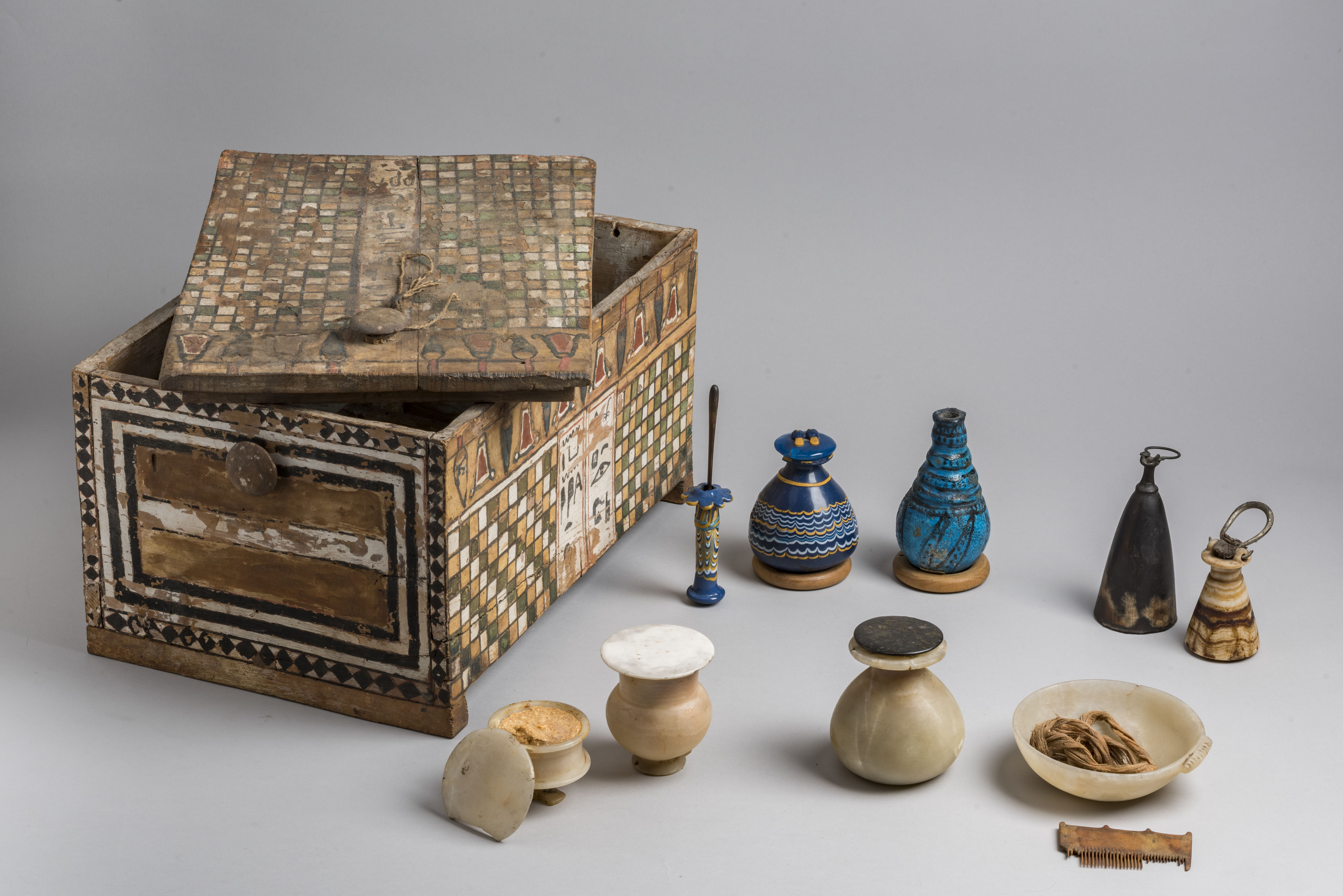
Merit's toilet box from the Tomb of Kha and Merit at Deir el-Medina (Eighteenth Dynasty), with alabaster and colored-glass jars, traces of ointments and fat-based creams, and a kohl tube with a stick applicator. Museo Egizio, Turin (S. 8479).

Beauty and cosmetics in ancient Egypt included pigments for the eyes, face and body, oils, ointments, aromatic resins, and the tools used to prepare, store and apply them. Toilet equipment included cosmetic palettes, jars, kohl tubes, applicators, mirrors, combs, hair accessories and jewellery. These products were used for body care, makeup, scenting, protection of the skin and eyes, and the ritual preparation of the dead. Their ingredients could be mineral, plant-derived or animal-derived. Analysis of twelve residues from eleven containers in the Petrie Museum of Egyptian Archaeology, published in 2022, identified inorganic ingredients based on lead, manganese or silicon together with vegetable oils, animal fats, conifer resin and beeswax, combined in different proportions among the samples.

Men, women and deities were represented with painted eyes, wigs, jewellery and other forms of personal adornment. In the daily service of Egyptian temples, divine statues were washed, dressed, adorned and anointed; cosmetics and ointments formed part of the ritual treatment of the cult image. The Ebers Papyrus preserves prescriptions for the eyes that include locally applied preparations; laboratory tests on some lead compounds found in Egyptian eye cosmetics have shown effects on living cells as well as their use as pigments. The myth of Horus, whose eye was injured and restored, also connected eye makeup with healing and protection.

Many surviving cosmetic objects come from necropolises, where mirrors, combs, jewellery, footwear and cosmetic containers were placed with the dead; their abundance among excavated material also reflects the concentration of many early excavations on cemeteries. Tombs could contain objects used by the deceased during life as well as objects made specifically for burial. During mummification, ointments, resins, bitumen and beeswax were applied to the body to perfume it, soften the skin, seal it or reshape it at different stages of treatment. Cosmetics on the skin, styled hair, wigs and extensions are also preserved on some mummies.

== Religion and funerary rites ==
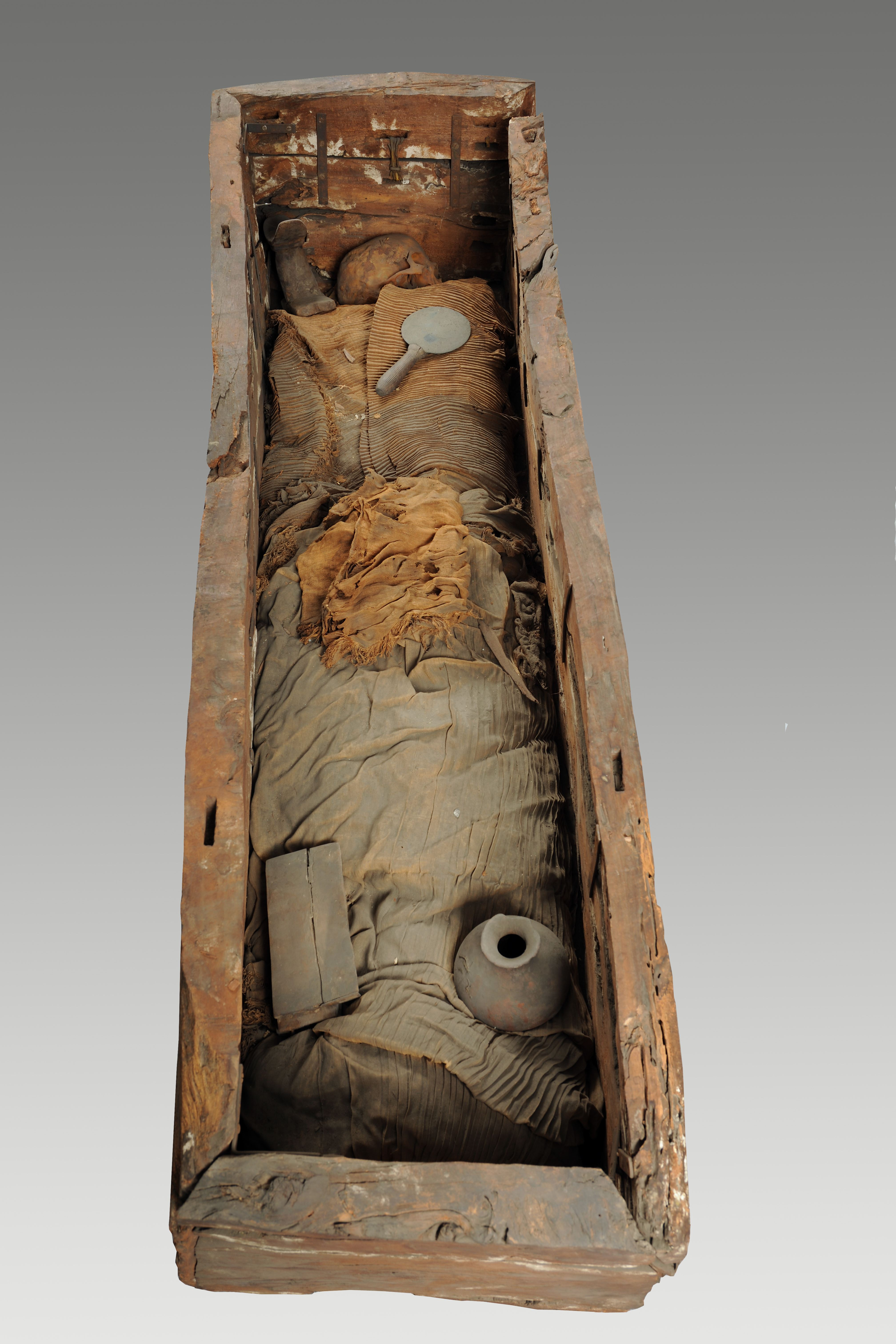
Mummy of a woman with pleated garments and cloths, found with a headrest, box, vessel and mirror at Asyut, Old Kingdom, Sixth Dynasty, 2305–2118 BC. Museo Egizio, Turin (S. 14396/a).

In sanctuaries, the divine statue was washed, dressed, adorned and treated with cosmetics and ointments during the daily ritual service. Egyptian images distinguished people and deities through clothing, ornaments, body shape and other visible attributes rather than relying on portrait-like realism. Eye makeup also had a mythological reference in Horus, whose eye was torn out by Seth and later restored; the healing of the eye was associated with the restoration of cosmic order. The frequency of funerary objects in archaeological collections is partly a result of the history of excavation, since many early excavations concentrated on necropolises. In tombs, mirrors, combs, jewellery, footwear and cosmetic containers could be possessions that had belonged to the deceased or objects made specifically for burial. Funerary preparation also included clothing and ornaments together with treatment of the body. During mummification, ointments were used to soften and perfume the skin, while bitumen, resins and beeswax were used to seal, protect or reshape the body. Cosmetics have been identified on the bodies of some mummies; in other cases styled hair, wigs or extensions survive.

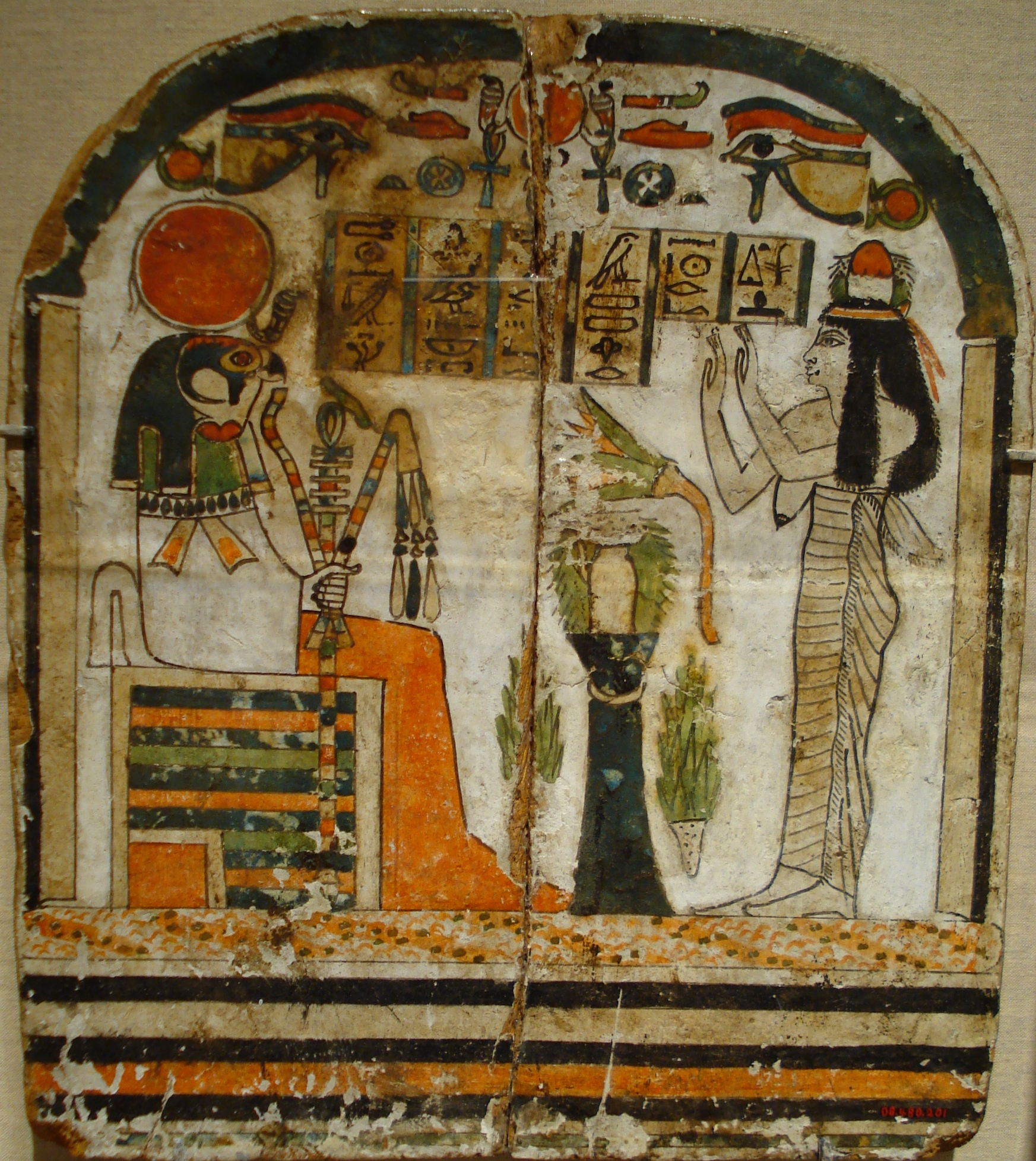
Stela of the woman Takhenemet before Ra-Horakhty, shown with a cone on her head, Third Intermediate Period, probably Twenty-fifth Dynasty, c. 775–653 BC, Brooklyn Museum (08.480.201).

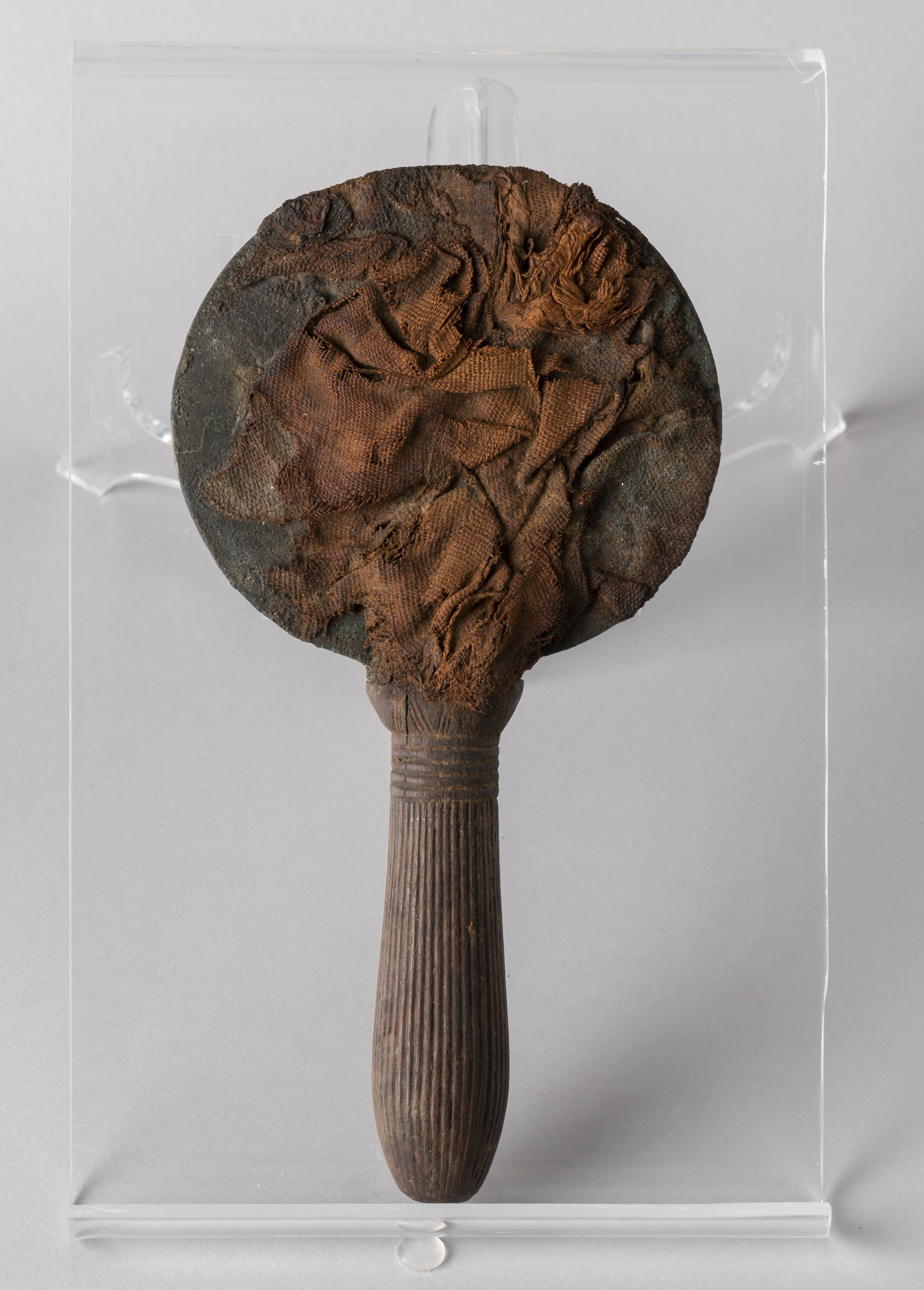
Wood-and-bronze mirror from Asyut, Old Kingdom, Sixth Dynasty, 2305–2118 BC. Museo Egizio, Turin (S. 14397).

== Social, symbolic and medical uses ==
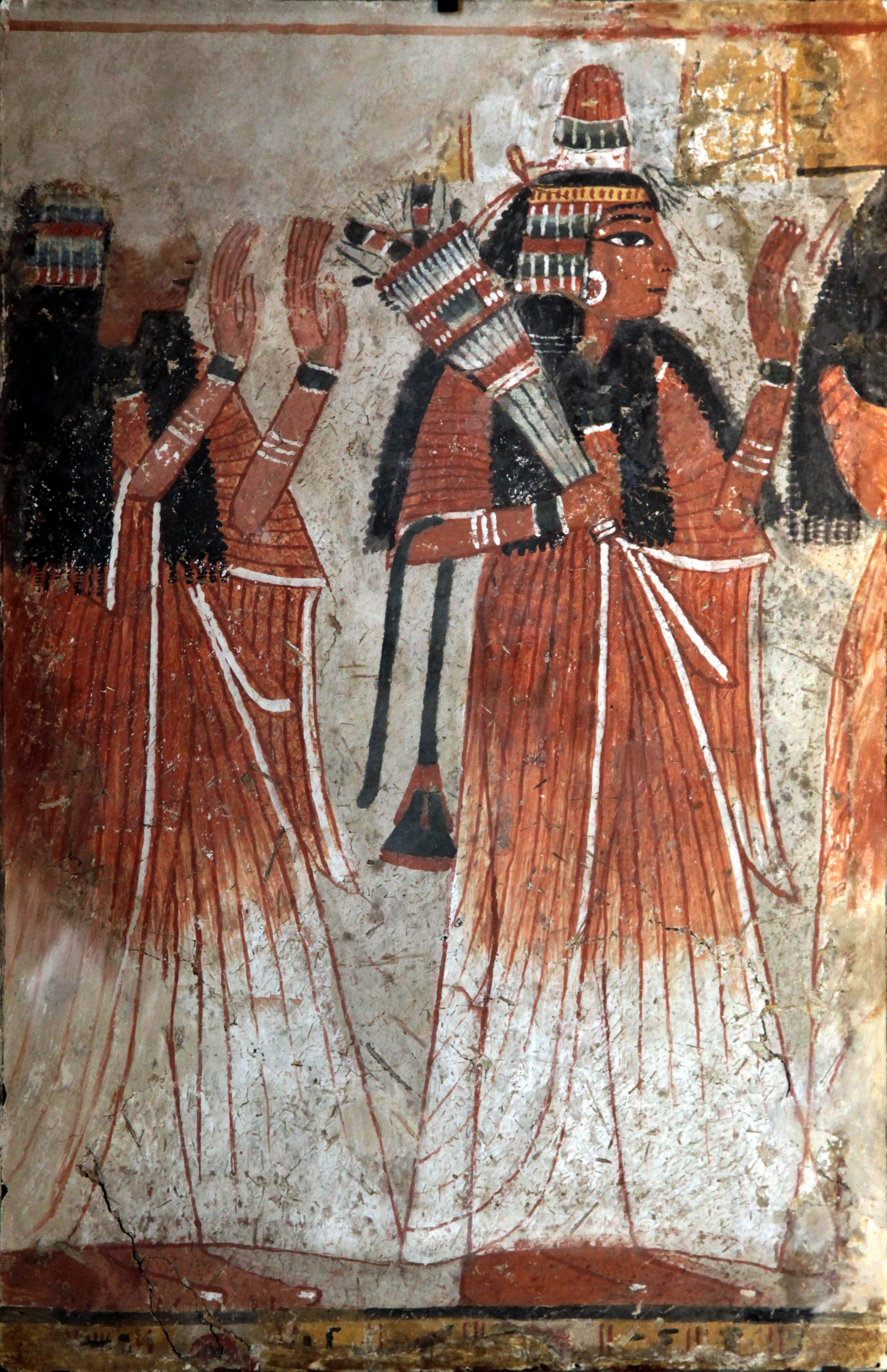
Fragment of a wall painting showing women in ceremonial dress with head cones, from a tomb in the Theban Necropolis, New Kingdom, Louvre (E 13108).

Egyptian representations show men, women and deities with painted eyes, wigs, jewellery, clothing and other adornments. Toilet objects placed in burials could likewise be possessions used during life or objects prepared specifically for the funerary assemblage. Burials of high-ranking people include elaborate boxes, stone, glass or faience containers, mirrors, combs and jewellery; some examples have gold or silver fittings. The box of the royal butler Kemeni from the Middle Kingdom is made of cedar with ebony and ivory veneer and silver fittings; it originally held eight small jars, probably for sacred oils used in funerary rites. Green was associated with vegetation, freshness, regeneration and life, while black could evoke alluvial soil, fertility and rebirth. The myth of the Eye of Horus, injured and then restored, further linked eye makeup with healing, protection and the restoration of cosmic order.

Egyptian medical texts prescribe plant, animal and mineral substances for the skin and eyes, including preparations administered as ointments or eye drops. The Ebers Papyrus contains prescriptions concerning ophthalmology and dermatology; substances applied to the skin, hair or eye area could be used for grooming, protection, ritual or treatment. Its eye recipes include drops, dressings and cosmetics for the eyes and eyelids, and some preparations contained lead compounds such as laurionite and phosgenite. In experiments on keratinocytes, submicromolar concentrations of lead ions, below one micromole per litre, induced an oxidative-stress response accompanied by increased production of nitric oxide. Because nitric oxide participates in innate immune defence, this increase could contribute to protection of the eye; the experiment does not show that ancient Egyptians added laurionite to makeup because they understood antimicrobial action in modern medical terms.

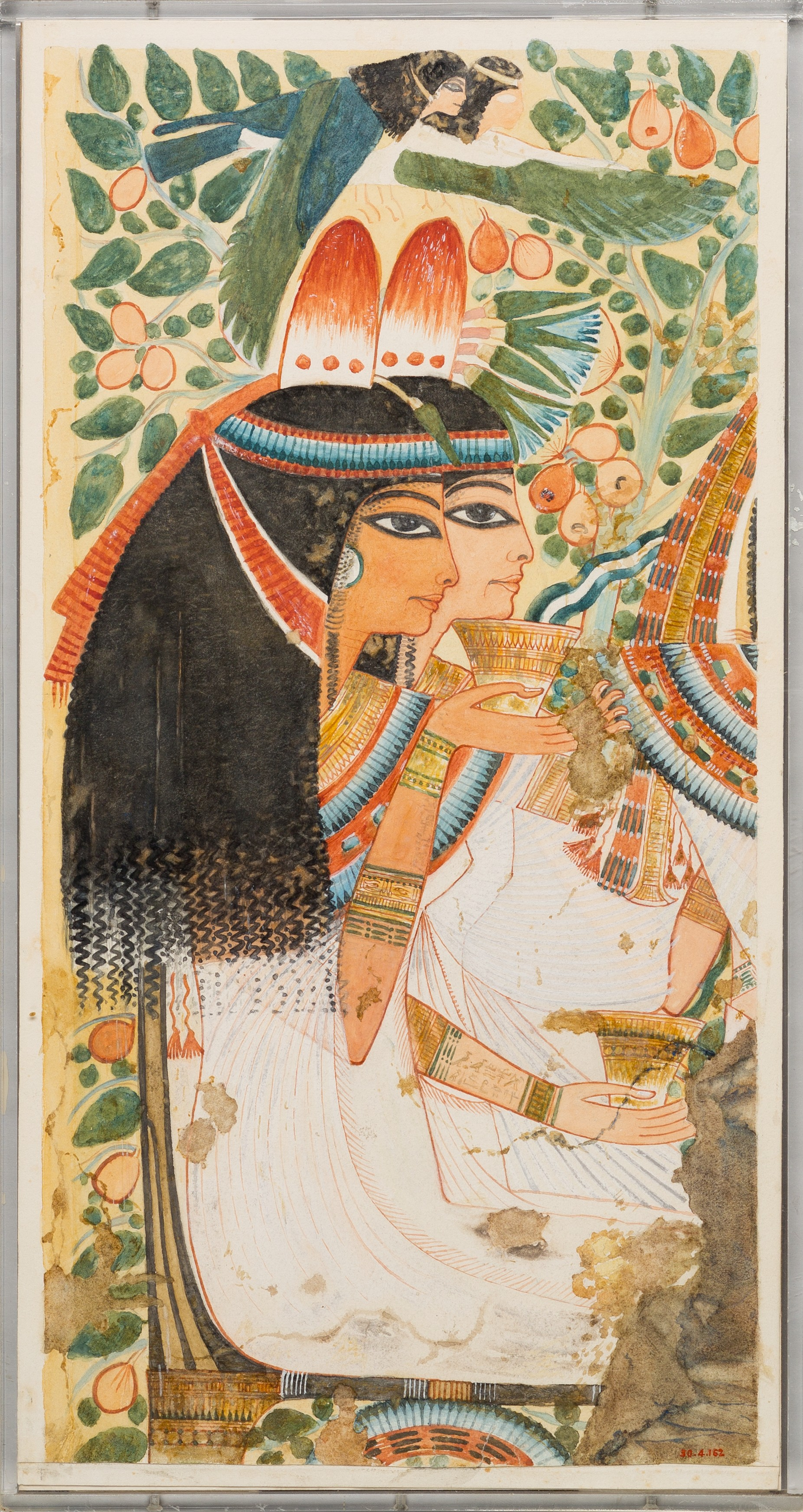
The mother and wife of Userhat, from Userhat's tomb at Thebes, New Kingdom, Eighteenth Dynasty, 1479–1425 BC, Metropolitan Museum of Art (30.4.162).

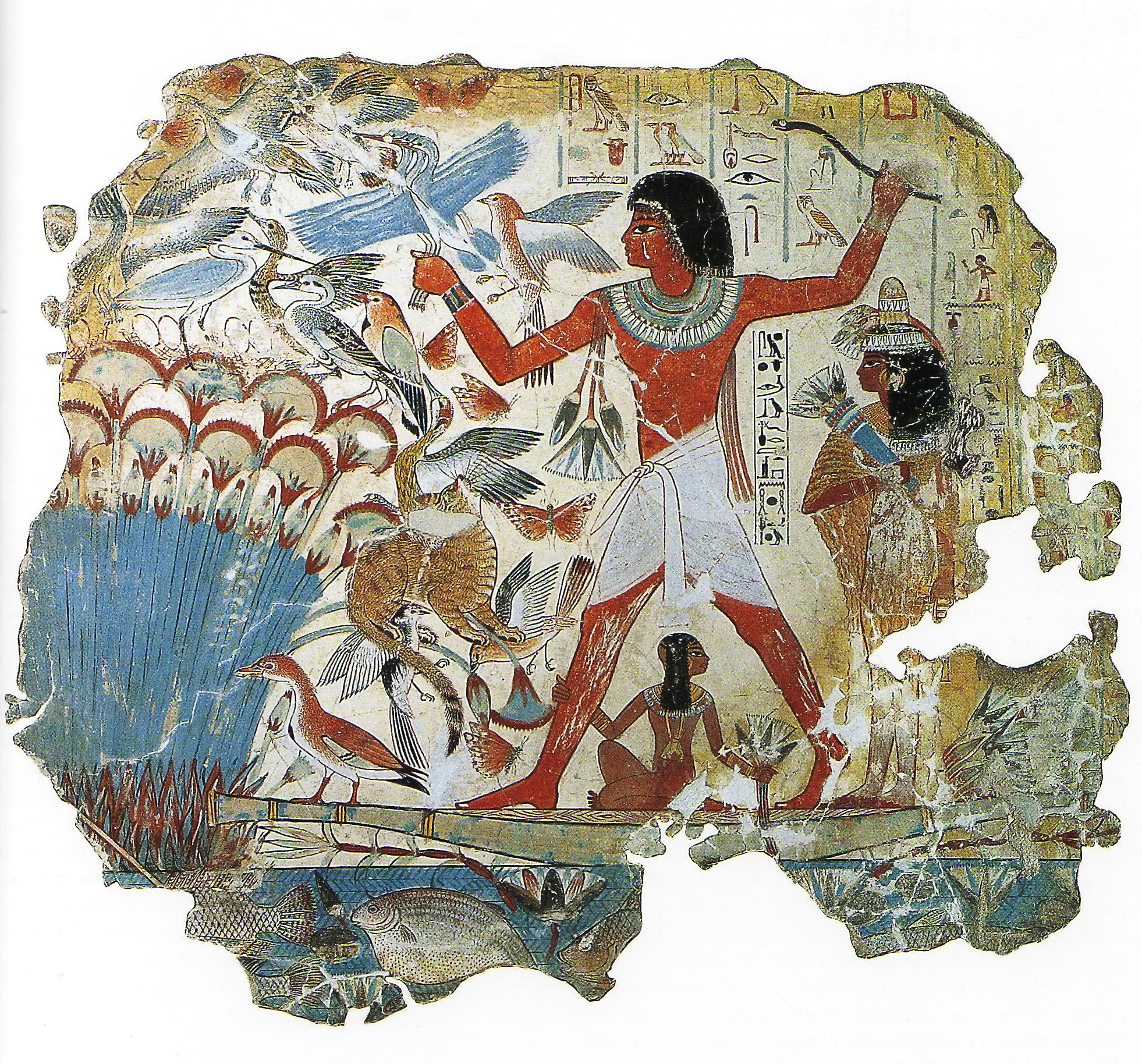
Detail of the banquet scene from the Tomb of Nebamun in the Theban Necropolis, Thebes, New Kingdom, Eighteenth Dynasty, c. 1370 BC, with four female musicians and two dancers; British Museum.

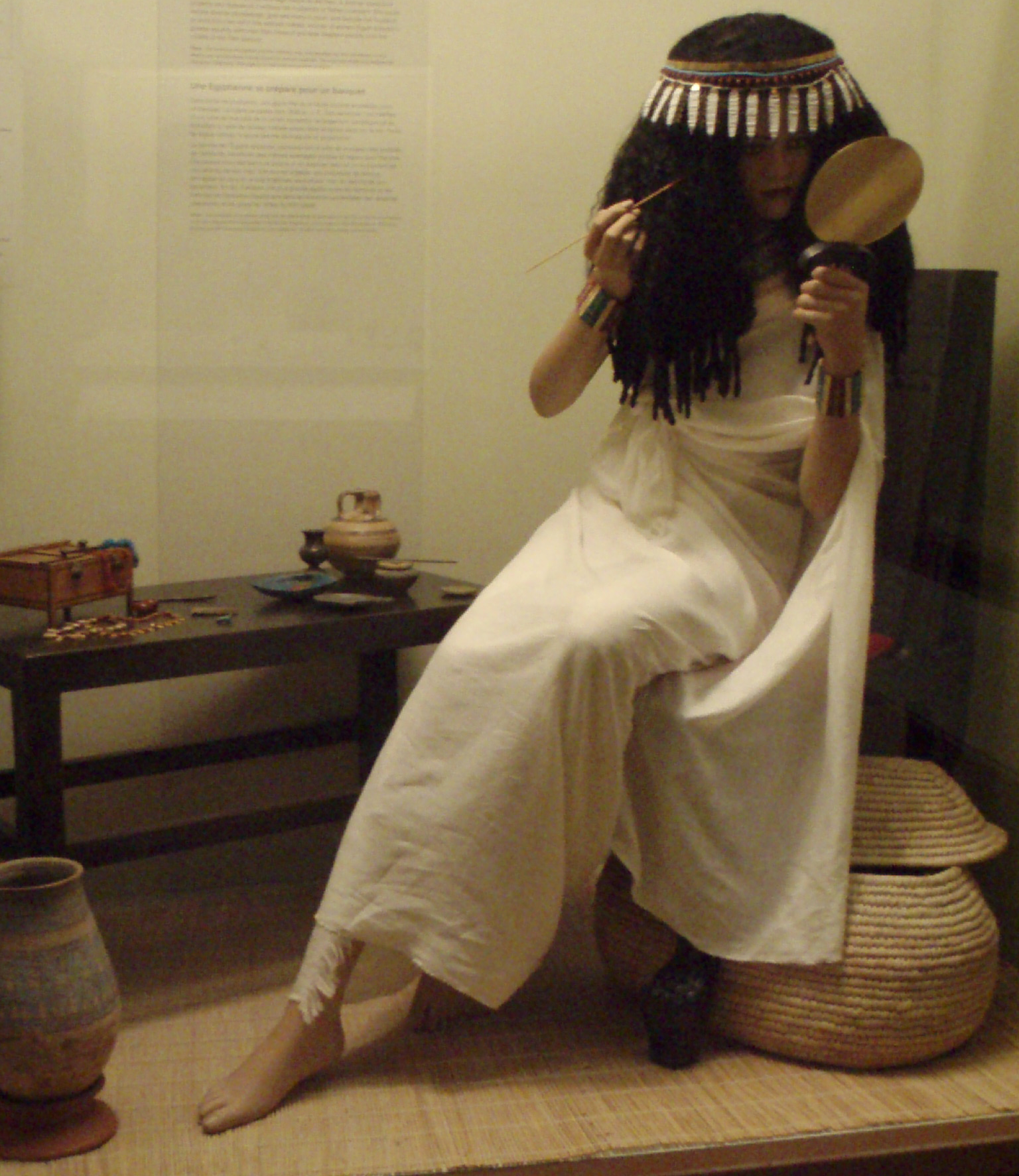
Modern reconstruction of an ancient Egyptian woman applying makeup in a diorama of the Royal Ontario Museum's Egyptian galleries.

== Materials and composition ==
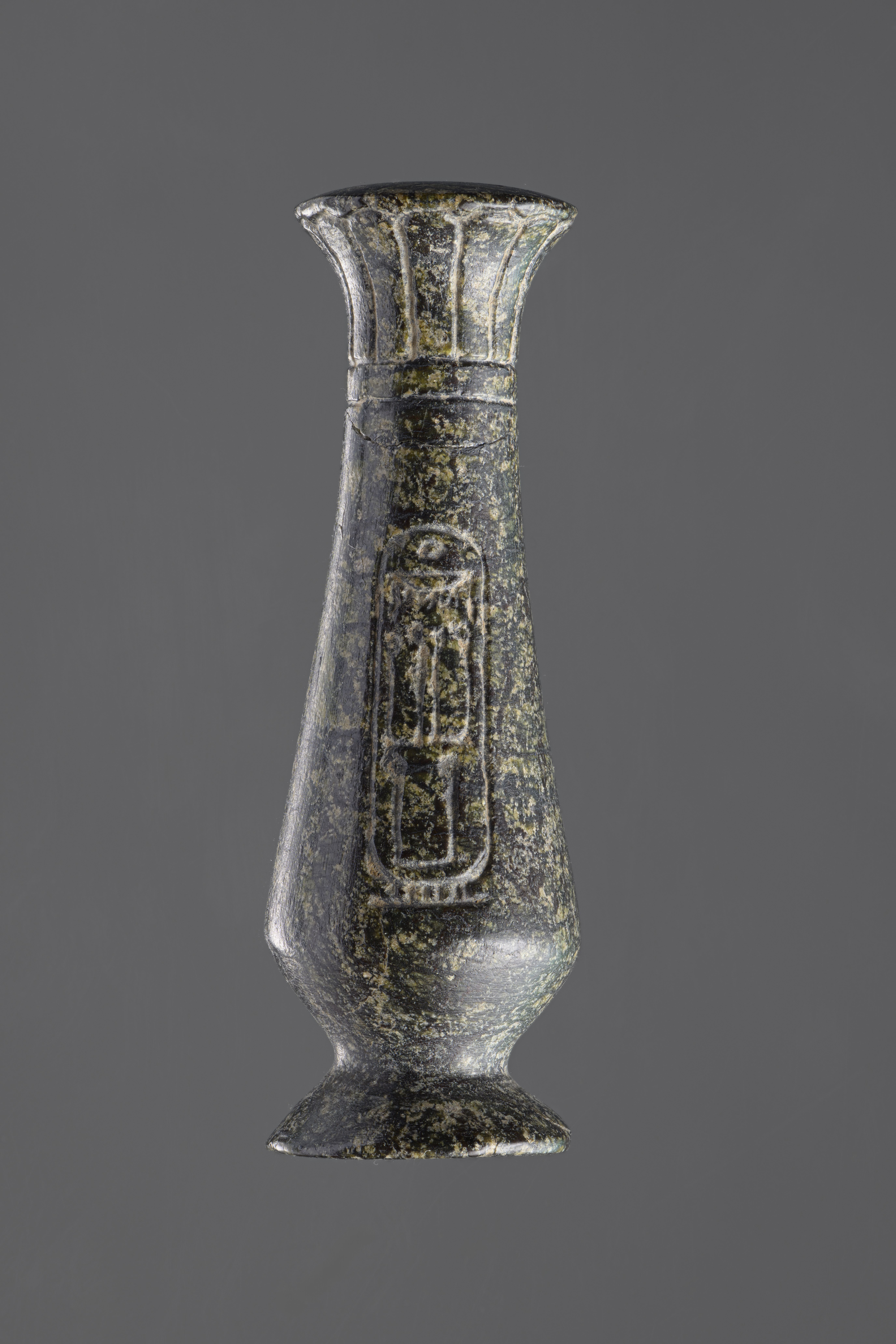
Serpentinite kohl tube bearing the cartouche of Amenemhat II, Middle Kingdom, Twelfth Dynasty, reign of Amenemhat II. Museo Egizio, Turin (S. 1496).

Stone palettes for grinding pigments appear in the Predynastic Period; green malachite was used for eye makeup from the earliest phases, while black galena appears in later Predynastic burials. Malachite continued to be used at least into the Nineteenth Dynasty, while galena continued into the Coptic period. From the Middle Kingdom, containers with a small opening for an applicator became common; elongated tubes for eye cosmetics also appear in the New Kingdom. Raw materials included minerals, plant products and substances of animal origin. Some aromatic resins came from West Asia, while Egyptian sources connect the supply of incense with the Land of Punt and areas of Somalia or South Arabia.

=== Eye pigments ===
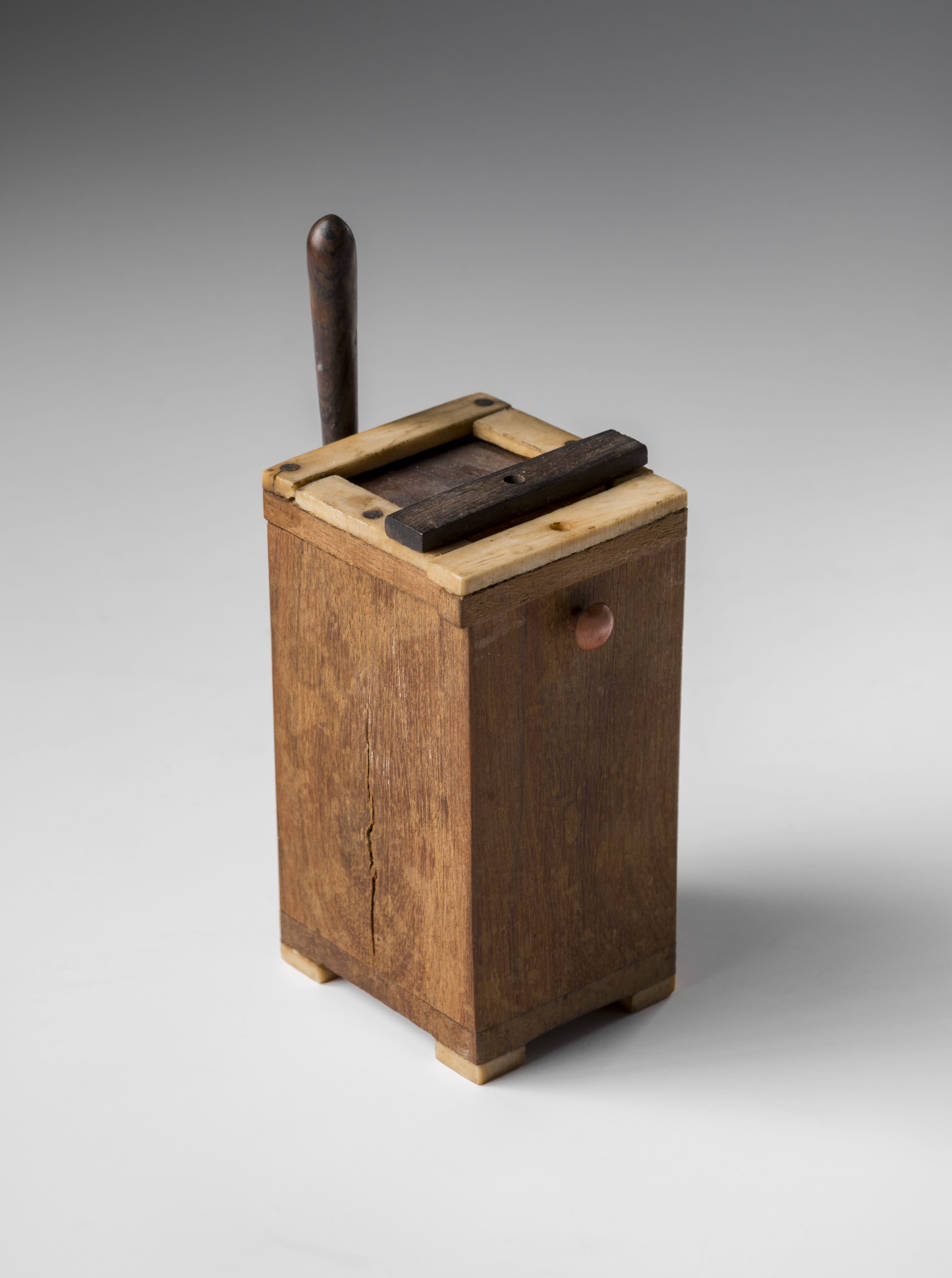
Kohl container with applicator from the Tomb of Kha and Merit at Deir el-Medina, New Kingdom, Eighteenth Dynasty, 1425–1353 BC. Museo Egizio, Turin (S. 8389).

Among eye pigments, green was obtained mainly from malachite, a copper mineral, while galena, a dark grey lead sulfide, became the predominant black pigment. Malachite is known from the Badarian Period and the earliest Predynastic phases at least through the Nineteenth Dynasty; galena appears in the later Predynastic Period and continued in use into the Coptic period. Both minerals have been found as raw pieces, as residues on grinding surfaces, and as prepared powder or compact masses. In Predynastic burials, malachite and galena could be kept in linen or leather bags, while prepared pigment also occurs in shells, sections of hollow reed, plant leaves and small vessels. The minerals were ground on stone palettes with small pebbles to produce a paste for eye makeup. From the Middle Kingdom, containers with a narrow opening accommodated thin applicators; elongated cosmetic tubes are also known from the New Kingdom.

One recorded formulation of kohl was a mixture of carbon black, fat and antimony, applied with a small stick to the eyelids and eyelashes to outline the eyes. When mixed with moisture from the eye, this type of preparation could partly filter sunlight and help counter fungal infections or irritation associated with heat and intense light. Thin applicators were used to take the cosmetic from tubes or jars and place it around the eye, as surviving sets demonstrate.

In a series of 58 analyses, galena was the principal component of 37 samples; the remainder included lead carbonate, black copper oxide, brown ochre, magnetic iron oxide, manganese oxide, antimony sulfide, malachite and chrysocolla. Only one sample consisted principally of an antimony compound, while a few others contained traces interpreted as accidental impurities; identifying Egyptian kohl in general with antimony therefore does not describe most of the samples examined. Archaeometric analysis of twelve residues from eleven containers in the Petrie Museum of Egyptian Archaeology, dating from the Old Kingdom to the New Kingdom, revealed both mineral and organic ingredients. Their inorganic fractions included ingredients based on lead, manganese or silicon; six of the eleven samples subjected to organic analysis consisted mainly of organic material. All but one contained vegetable oils, three also contained animal fats, and conifer resin and beeswax were identified as well.

Analyses of eye cosmetics dating from about 2000 to 1200 BC have identified two chlorinated lead compounds in addition to galena and cerussite: laurionite and phosgenite. Because laurionite and phosgenite did not correspond either to naturally mined minerals or to alteration products of the samples, they were interpreted as substances made artificially through solution-based processes. Analysis of 52 samples from cosmetic containers at the Louvre found galena, cerussite, phosgenite and laurionite as the principal lead compounds. Experimental synthesis reproduced the two chlorides by reacting litharge with salt, sometimes with natron added, in warm water; laurionite and phosgenite precipitated from the solution.

=== Pigments for the face, body and hair ===
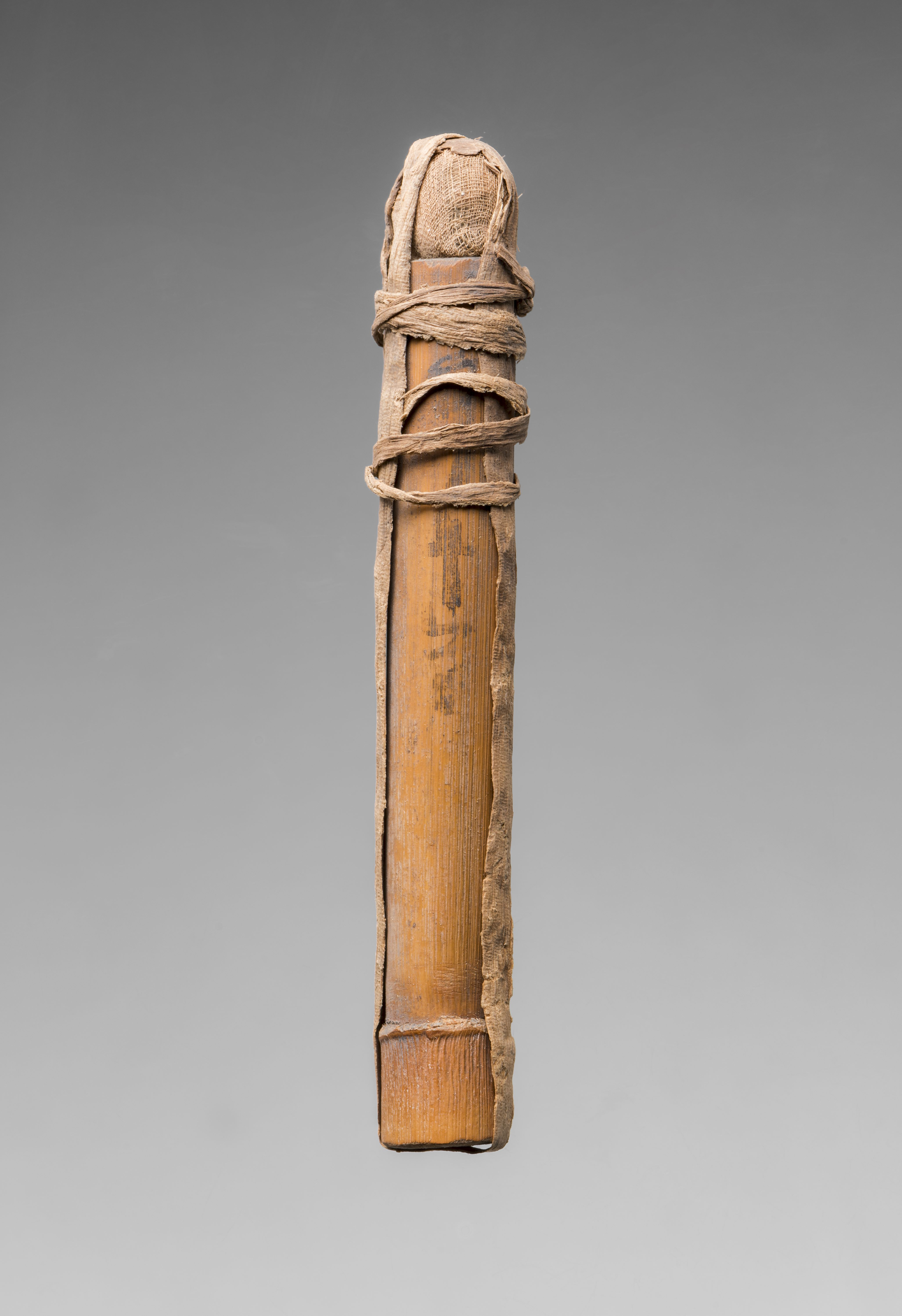
Plant-fibre kohl tube from the Tomb of Kha and Merit at Deir el-Medina, New Kingdom, Eighteenth Dynasty, 1425–1353 BC. Museo Egizio, Turin (S. 8381).

Red ochre occurs on Predynastic cosmetic palettes alongside eye pigments. When associated with palettes or preserved as a stain on grinding stones, it can indicate the preparation of color for other parts of the body; use on the cheeks has been proposed in particular. The material is a natural pigment based on iron oxides, often loosely described as hematite but more accurately classified in the samples concerned as red ochre. Because the same pigment was also used for painting tombs and objects and for writing, its presence in a burial does not by itself prove a cosmetic use. A colored substance on the face or body could have cosmetic, medical or ritual functions, so its purpose cannot always be determined from its location alone. Mineral substances used in remedies included iron oxides, carbon from charred wood, antimony, copper and lead compounds. Ancient sources also mention an Egyptian ointment made from cyprinum, tentatively identified with henna; its leaves, made into a paste, could color the palms, soles, nails and hair. Color visible on mummies does not by itself demonstrate cosmetic treatment, because some discoloration may derive from embalming materials.

=== Ointments, oils, perfumes and incense ===
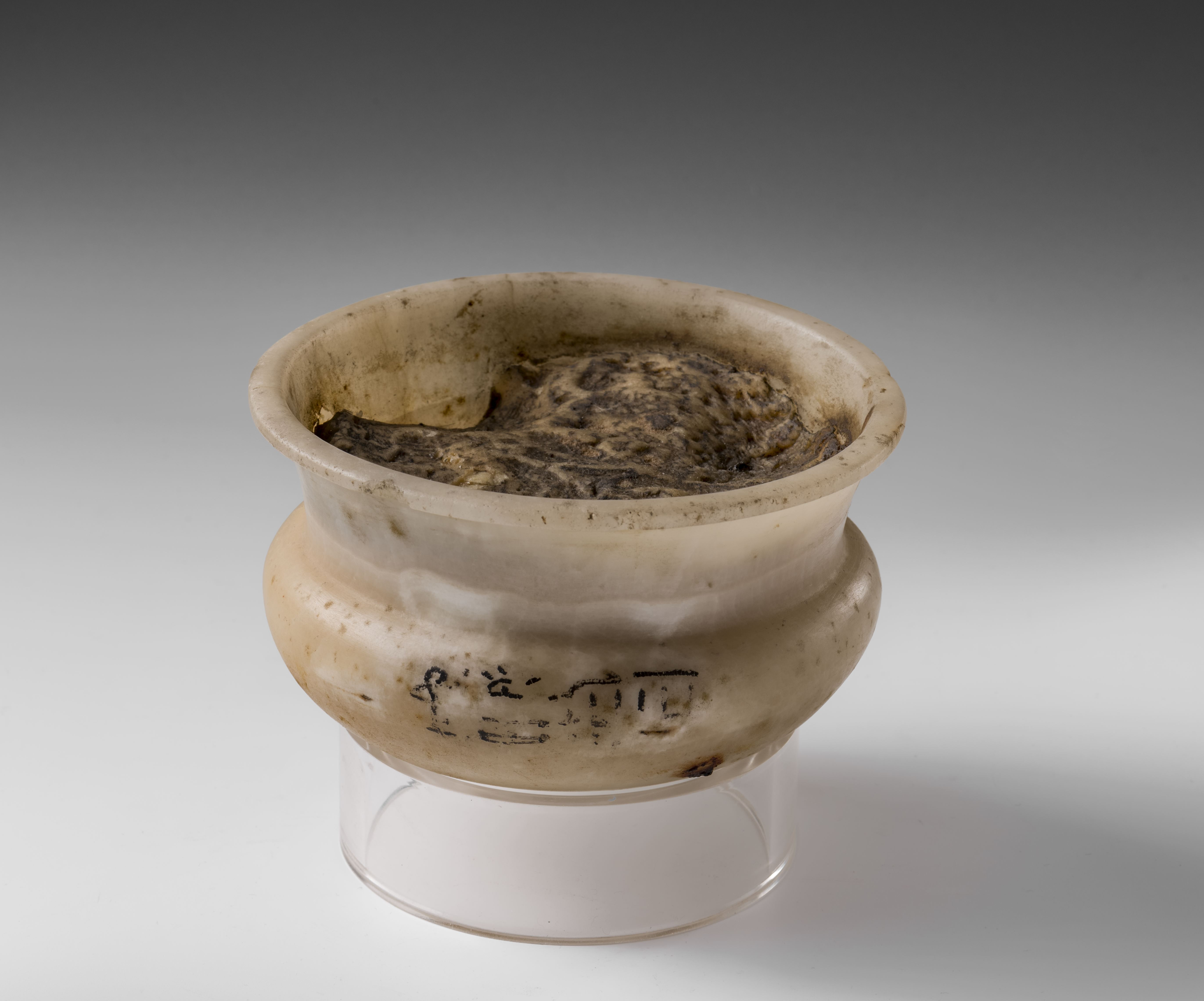
Jar containing remains of a scented ointment, from the Tomb of Kha and Merit at Deir el-Medina, New Kingdom, Eighteenth Dynasty, 1425–1353 BC. Museo Egizio, Turin (S. 8385).

Scented ointments, oils and fatty substances were applied to skin and hair to soften, protect or perfume them, and they also occurred in religious rites and funerary preparation. In Egypt's hot, dry climate, fatty bases could also absorb and retain aromatic materials. Ancient sources mention castor oil among the oils used by poorer people, while solid fats were probably animal-derived. During mummification, ointments were spread on the skin of the dead to soften and perfume it. Other materials, including resins, bitumen and beeswax, were used to seal, protect or reshape the body.

Alcohol-based liquid perfumes do not correspond to the preparations of the earlier pharaonic periods, for which the distillation needed to isolate aromatic essences is not known. Oils and fats could instead absorb aromatic substances from petals or other plant parts left in contact with the fatty base. Greek and Roman sources describe scented preparations made with oils and plants, while several oils appear among the ingredients of Egyptian ointments. Aromatic materials included plant products, resins and gum resins. There is no evidence for the use in pharaonic Egypt of animal-derived scents such as ambergris, civet or musk; resins and gum resins, however, were used to scent oils and fats. Textual expressions translated as "sweet oil of gums" and "ointment of gums" have cautiously been understood as references to aromatic resins or gum resins, since true gums are odorless. A resin generally identified with a species of Pistacia imported from Western Asia was used as incense, in ointments and in mummification; its Egyptian name, sntr, literally meant "to make divine".

Texts, scenes in the Book of the Dead, temples and tombs show the use of incense, while burners and remains of the combustible material have also been recovered from burials. By 1930, written references to incense were known from the Fifth and Sixth Dynasties, together with a burner attributed to the Eighth Dynasty. The earliest material sample described as securely identifiable as incense came from the end of the Eighteenth Dynasty and consisted of small pellets comparable with those represented on monuments. Frankincense, or olibanum, is an aromatic gum resin produced by trees of the genus Boswellia, especially in Somalia and South Arabia. Egyptian sources give regions south of Egypt and Punt as places from which incense was obtained; at least some of these references may concern frankincense.

Fumigations and ointments appear among remedies in Egyptian medical texts; kyphi, known from the Ebers Papyrus and other sources, could be used both as incense and as a medicine. Recipes preserved in the temples of Philae and Edfu have been experimentally reconstructed as a mixture of sixteen ingredients. These included Cymbopogon schoenanthus, cassia, cinnamon, mint, Phoenician juniper, acacia, henna and Cyperus longus. The mixture also included mastic, raisins, wine, honey and myrrh.

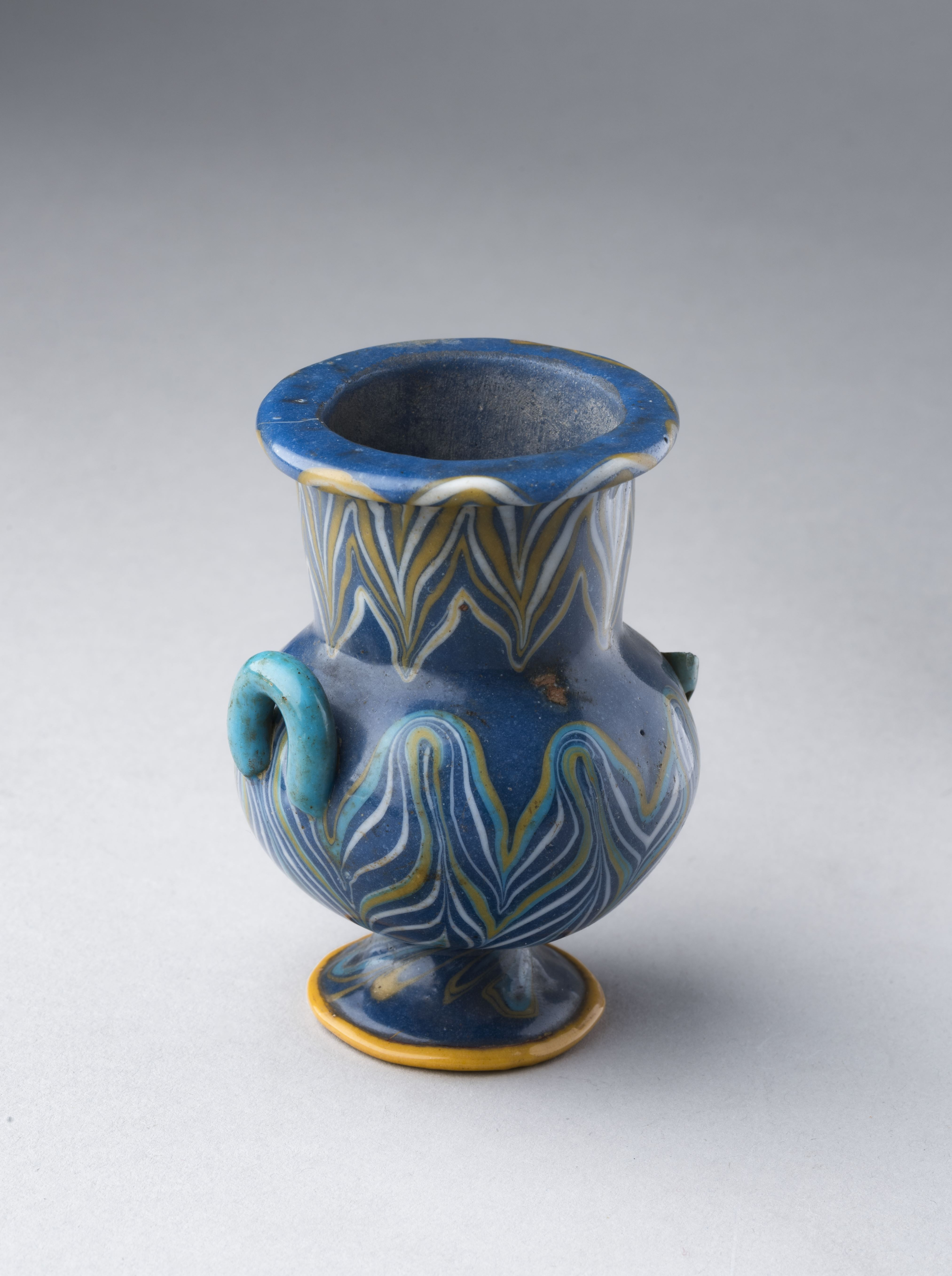
Decorated colored-glass cosmetic jar, Eighteenth Dynasty. Museo Egizio, Turin (Cat. 3402).

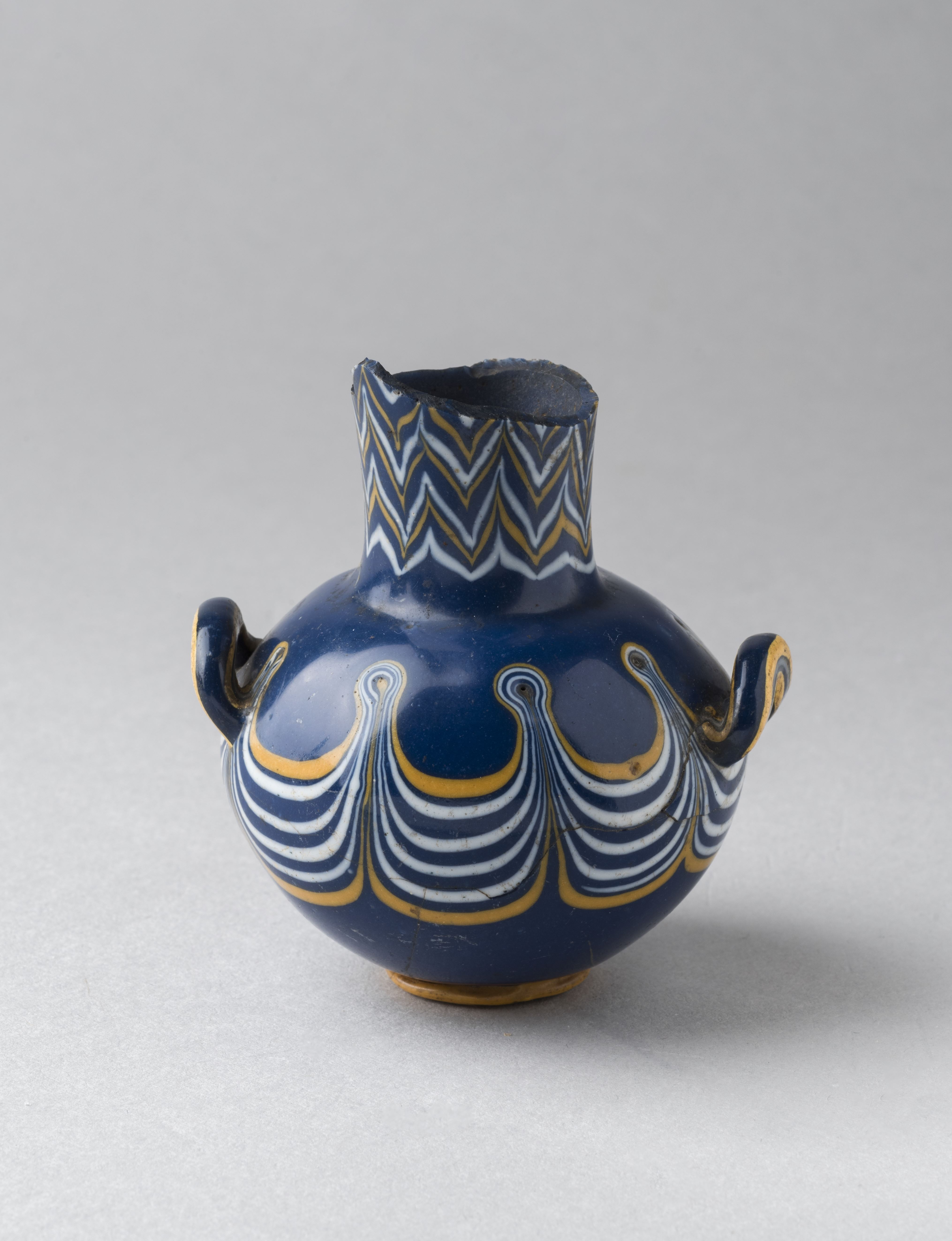
Decorated colored-glass cosmetic jar. Museo Egizio, Turin (Cat. 3403).

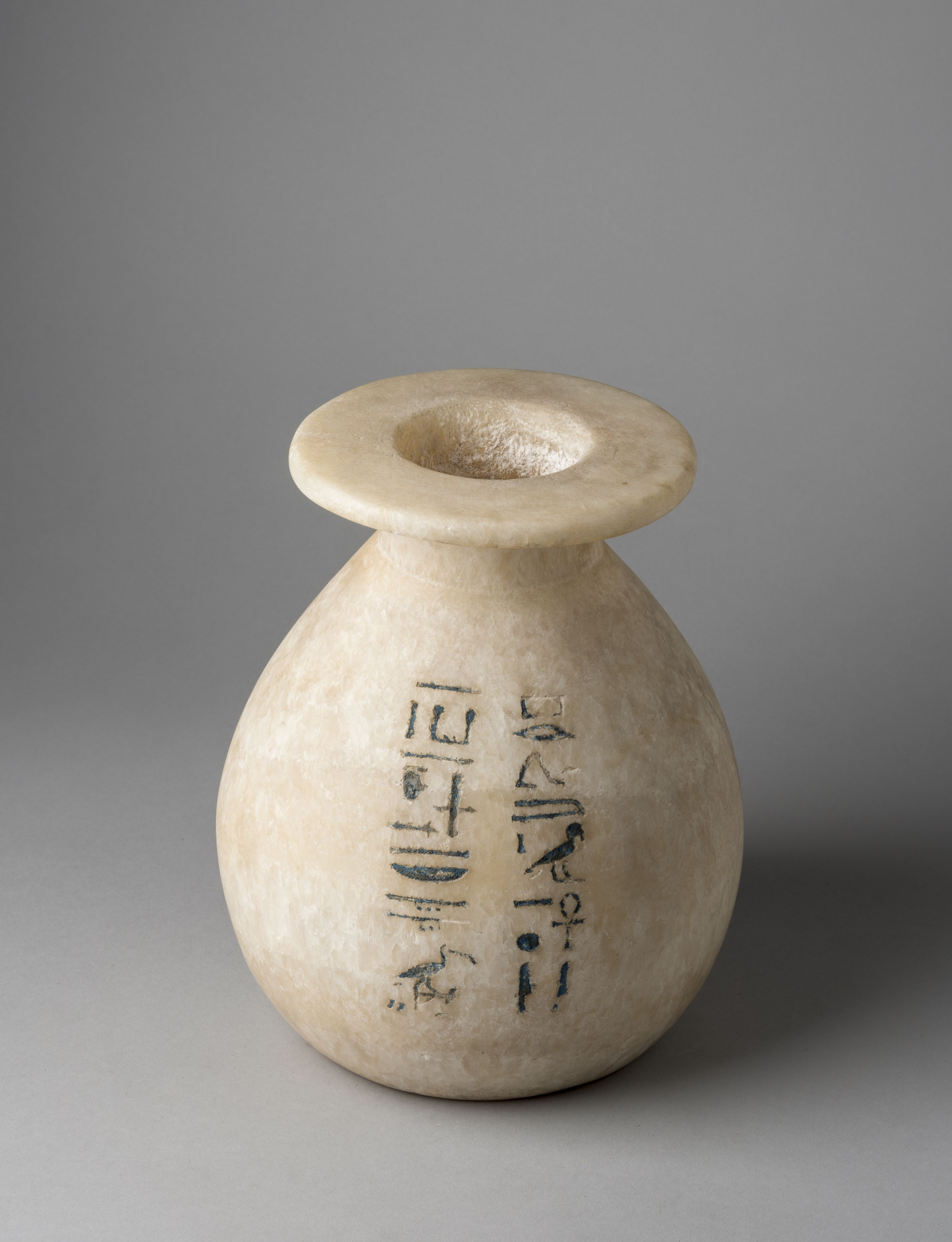
Alabaster ointment jar of Djehuty, Eighteenth Dynasty, 1458–1425 BC. Museo Egizio, Turin (Cat. 3225).

== Tools and containers ==
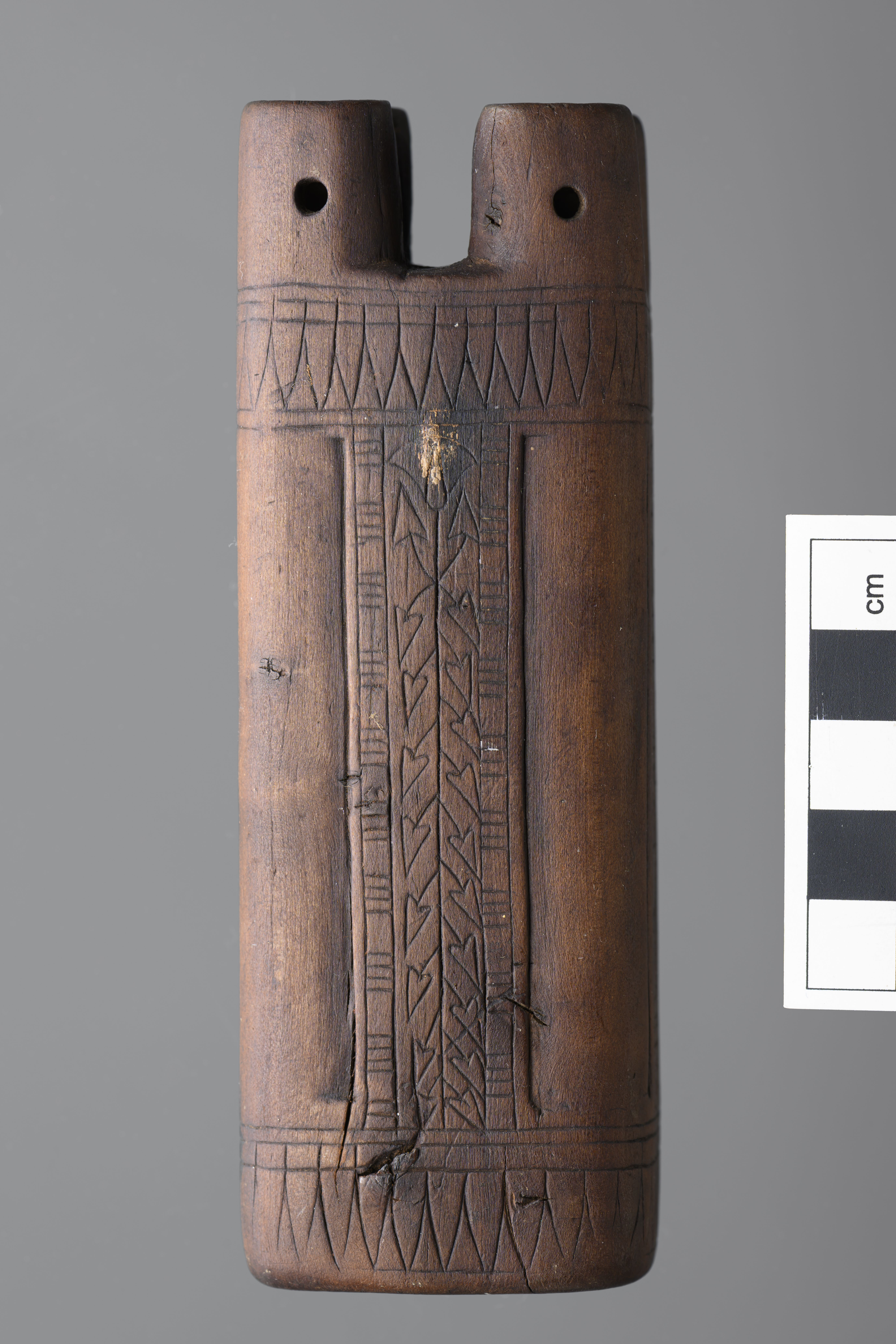
Double kohl case in broad-leaved wood, 1076–664 BC, Third Intermediate Period. Museo Egizio, Turin (Cat. 4929).

=== Cosmetic palettes ===
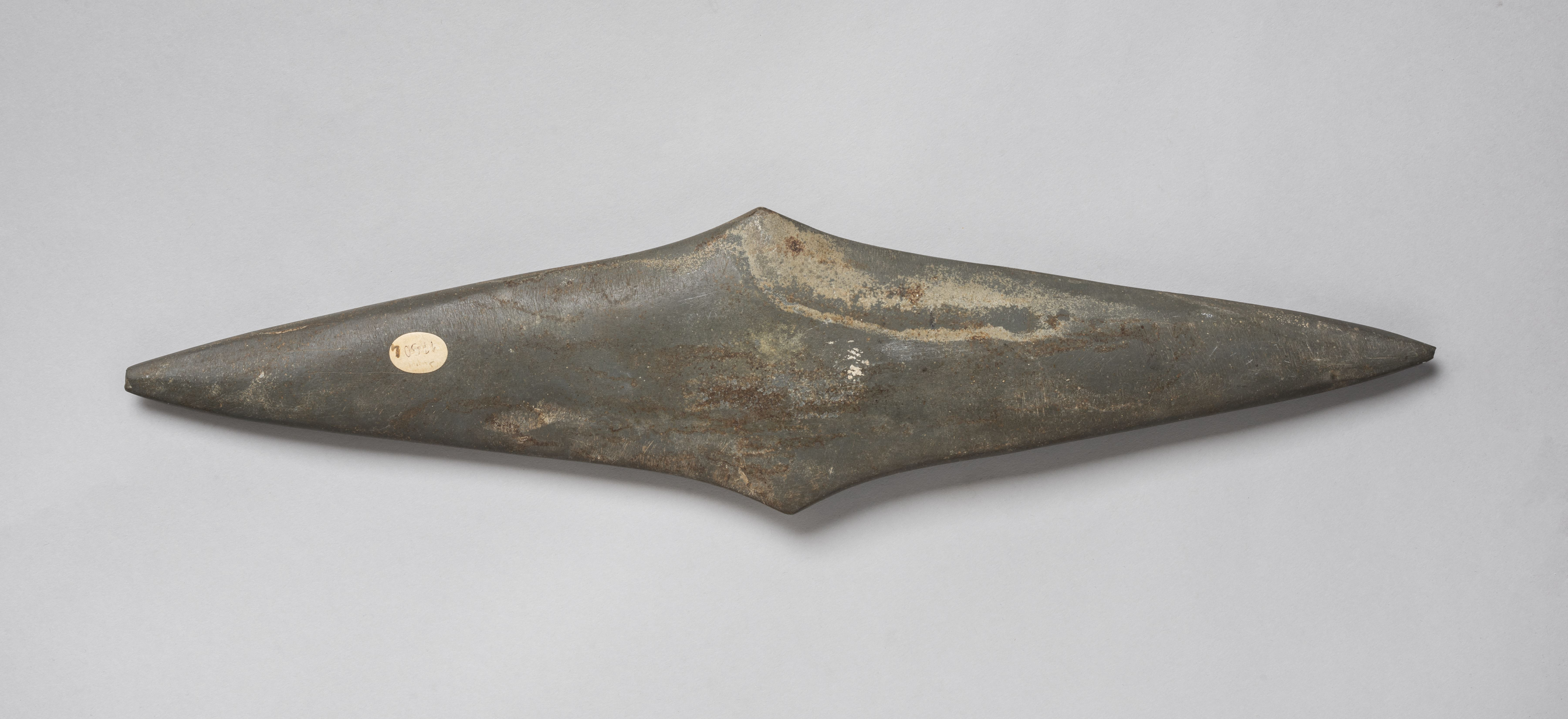
Greywacke cosmetic palette from Gebelein, Predynastic Period, Naqada I. Museo Egizio, Turin (S. 17504).

Predynastic cosmetic palettes were stone surfaces on which minerals were ground with small pebbles into a paste used especially for eye makeup. Many are made of siltstone and have geometric or zoomorphic forms, including fish, birds, turtles and hippopotamuses. Traces of malachite and galena show that green and black eye pigments were ground on them, while red ochre on some surfaces may have been prepared for coloring other parts of the body. The Metropolitan Museum of Art, for example, holds a fish-shaped greywacke palette from Hierakonpolis, dated to Naqada III around 3300–3100 BC. Another fish-shaped Predynastic palette in the Cleveland Museum of Art has a depression at the center of its grinding surface. Alongside practical grinding palettes, large ceremonial examples appeared between the late Predynastic and Early Dynastic periods. The Narmer Palette belongs to this group: it retains the general form and grinding depression of a cosmetic palette, but its large-scale figural decoration and royal imagery distinguish it from everyday tools for preparing makeup.

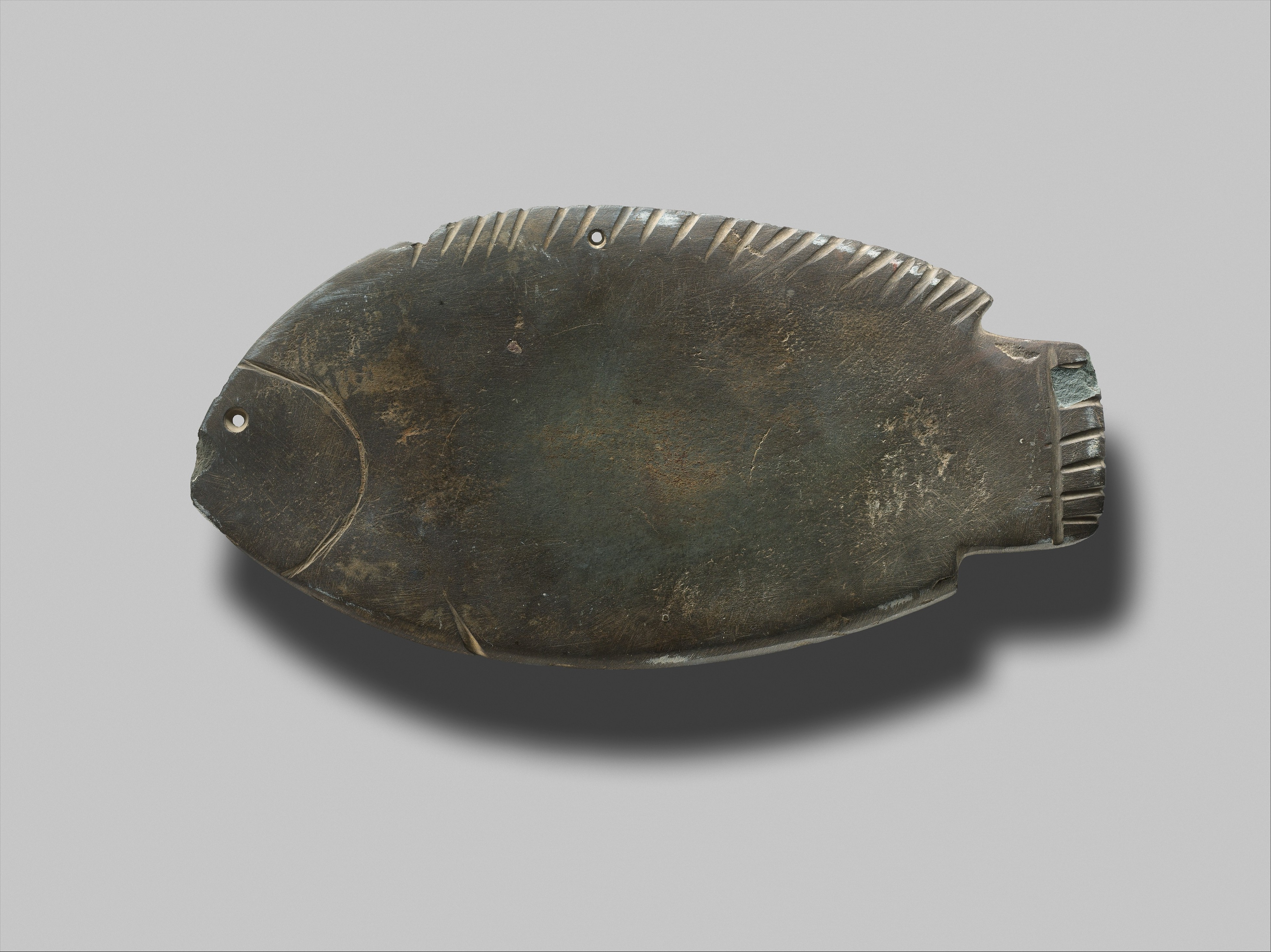
Fish-shaped cosmetic palette from Hierakonpolis, Predynastic Period, Naqada III, 3300–3100 BC, Metropolitan Museum of Art.

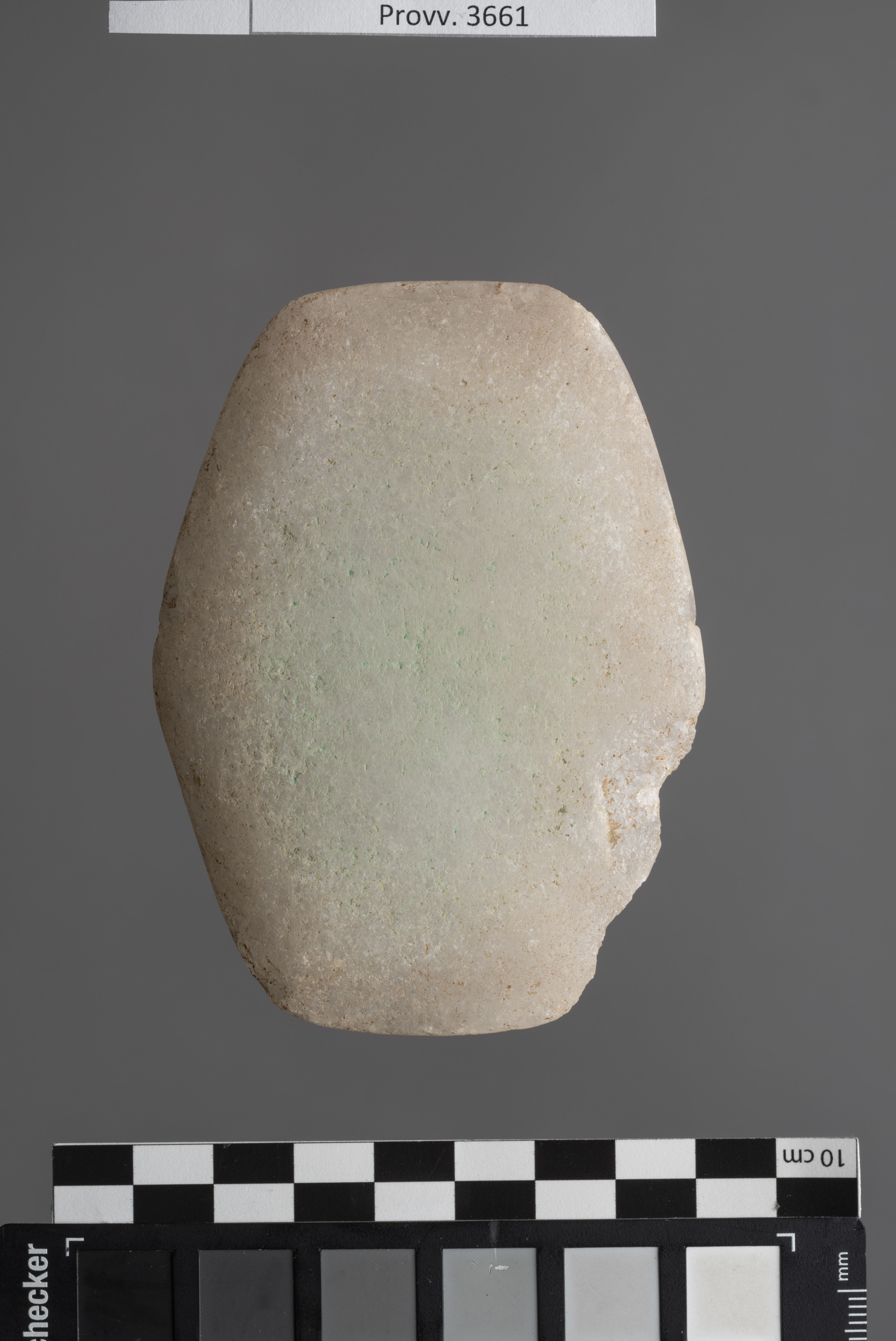
Rectangular quartz cosmetic palette from Tamit, tomb 1, Predynastic Period, late fourth millennium BC, 3600–3000 BC. Museo Egizio, Turin (Provv. 3661).

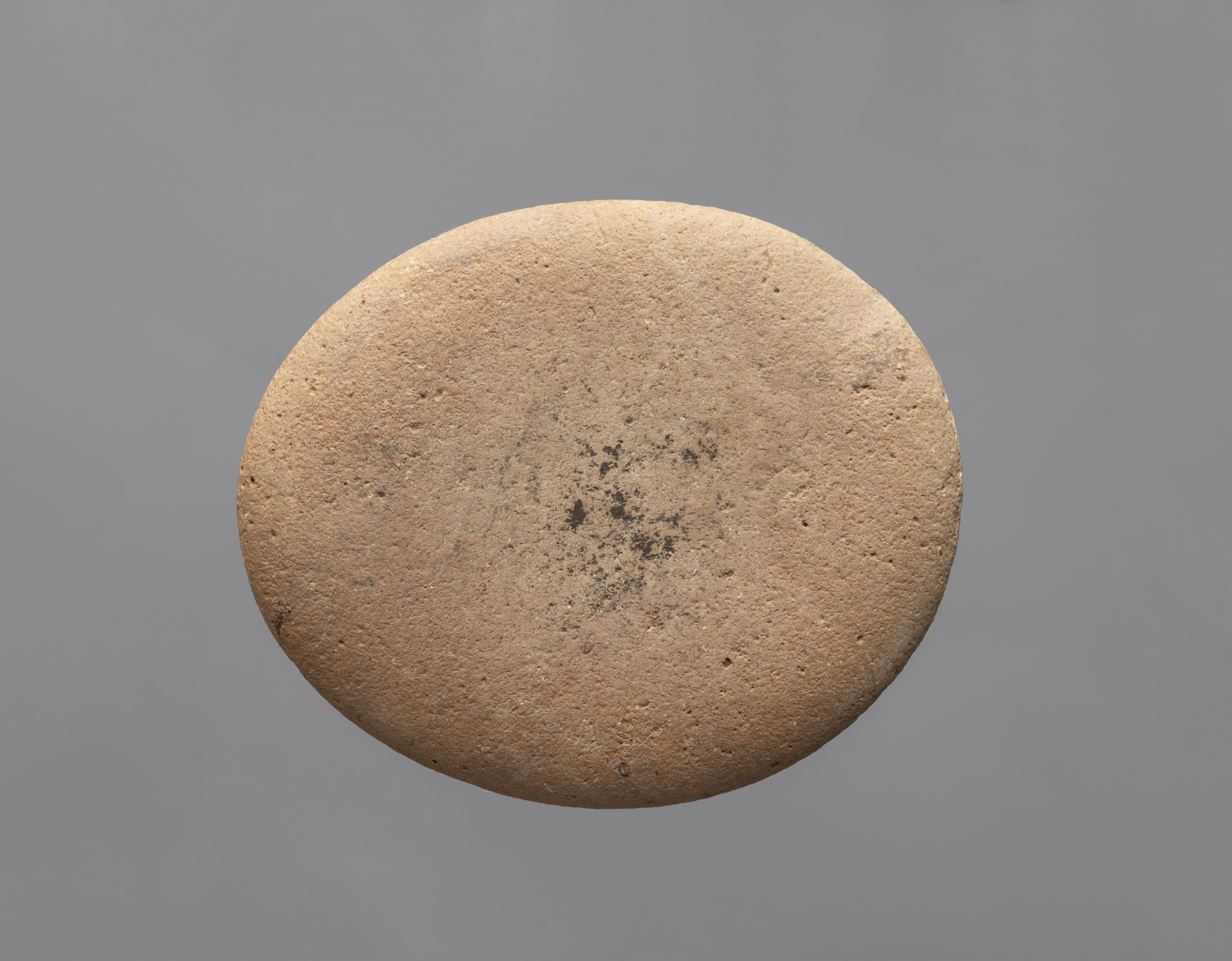
Limestone cosmetic palette from Heliopolis, Predynastic Period, Naqada IIC–IIIA, 3500–3200 BC. Museo Egizio, Turin (S. 4034/01).

=== Boxes, jars and cases ===
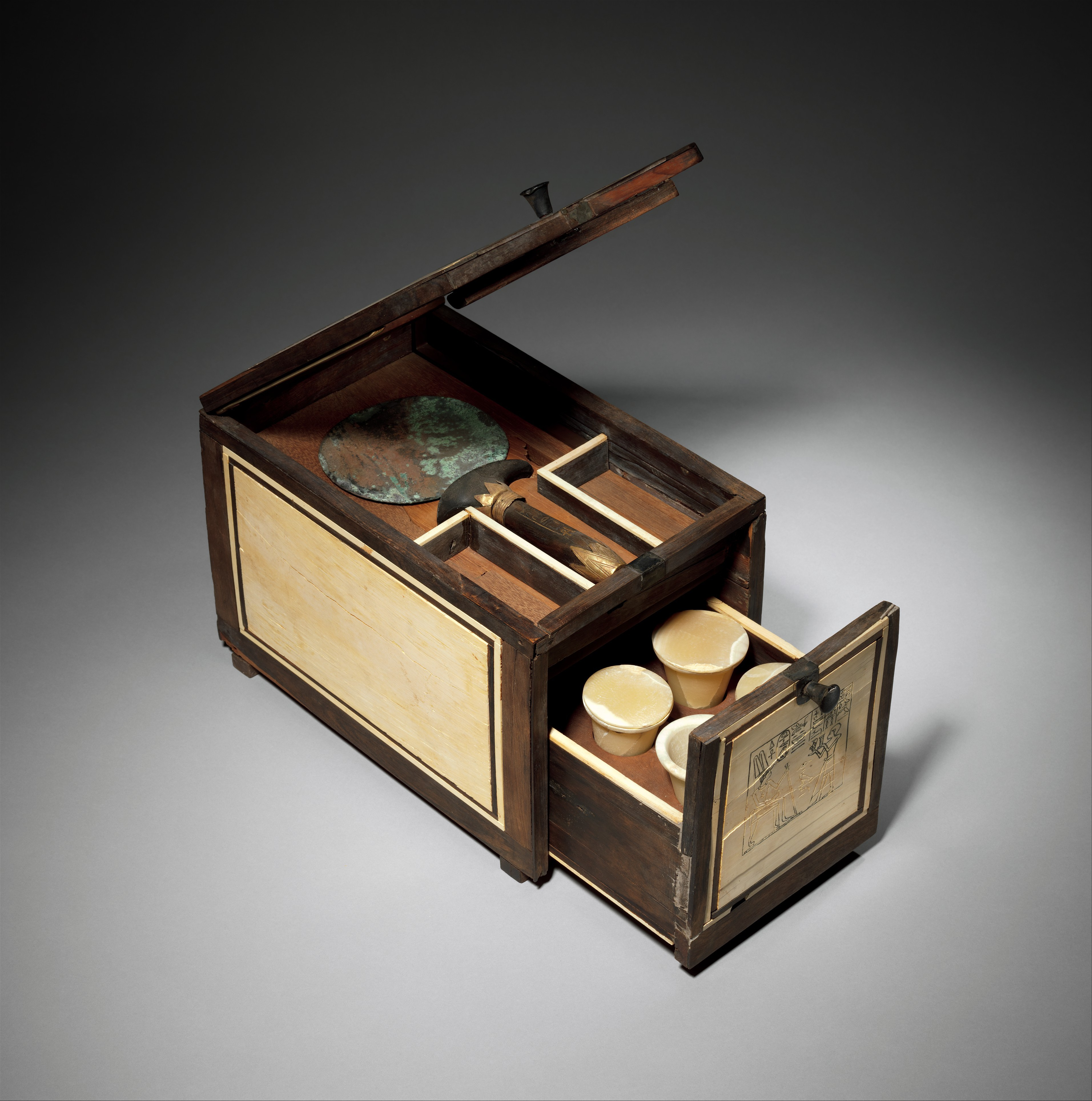
Cosmetic box of the royal butler Kemeni, Middle Kingdom, Twelfth Dynasty, 1814–1805 BC, Metropolitan Museum of Art.

Kohl, oils, ointments and fatty preparations were stored in boxes, jars, cases and tubes; from the Middle Kingdom there are containers designed specifically for eye makeup, with a small opening for a long, thin applicator, while elongated cosmetic tubes also appear in the New Kingdom. Merit's Eighteenth-Dynasty toilet box preserves alabaster and colored-glass jars, residues of ointments and fat-based creams, and a kohl tube with its stick applicator. The Middle Kingdom box of the royal butler Kemeni is made of cedar with ebony and ivory veneer and silver fittings. It originally held eight small jars, probably intended for sacred oils used in funerary rites. Twelve calcite vessels of four types have been associated with the burial equipment of Princess Nbw-m-tḫ, four of them held by the Museo Egizio; a quartzite cosmetic implement belonging to the same group is in the Louvre. A glassy-faience box in the Metropolitan Museum, dated to 664–300 BC and shaped as a composite column capital, has stains inside several compartments showing that they once held ointment.

Merit's toilet box, viewed from above, from the Tomb of Kha and Merit at Deir el-Medina, New Kingdom, Eighteenth Dynasty, 1425–1353 BC. Museo Egizio, Turin (S. 8479).

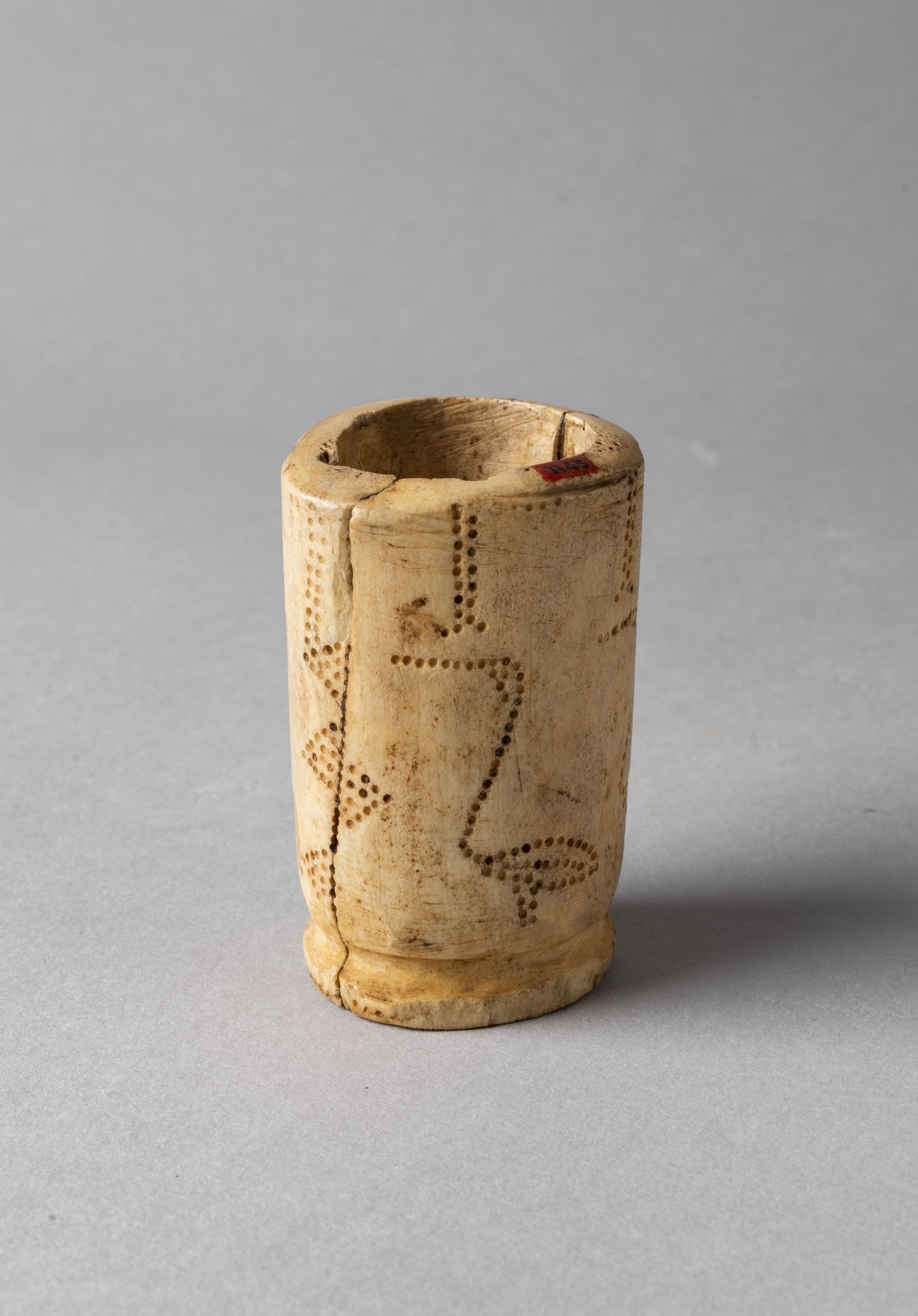
Ivory cosmetic box. Museo Egizio, Turin (S. 1143).

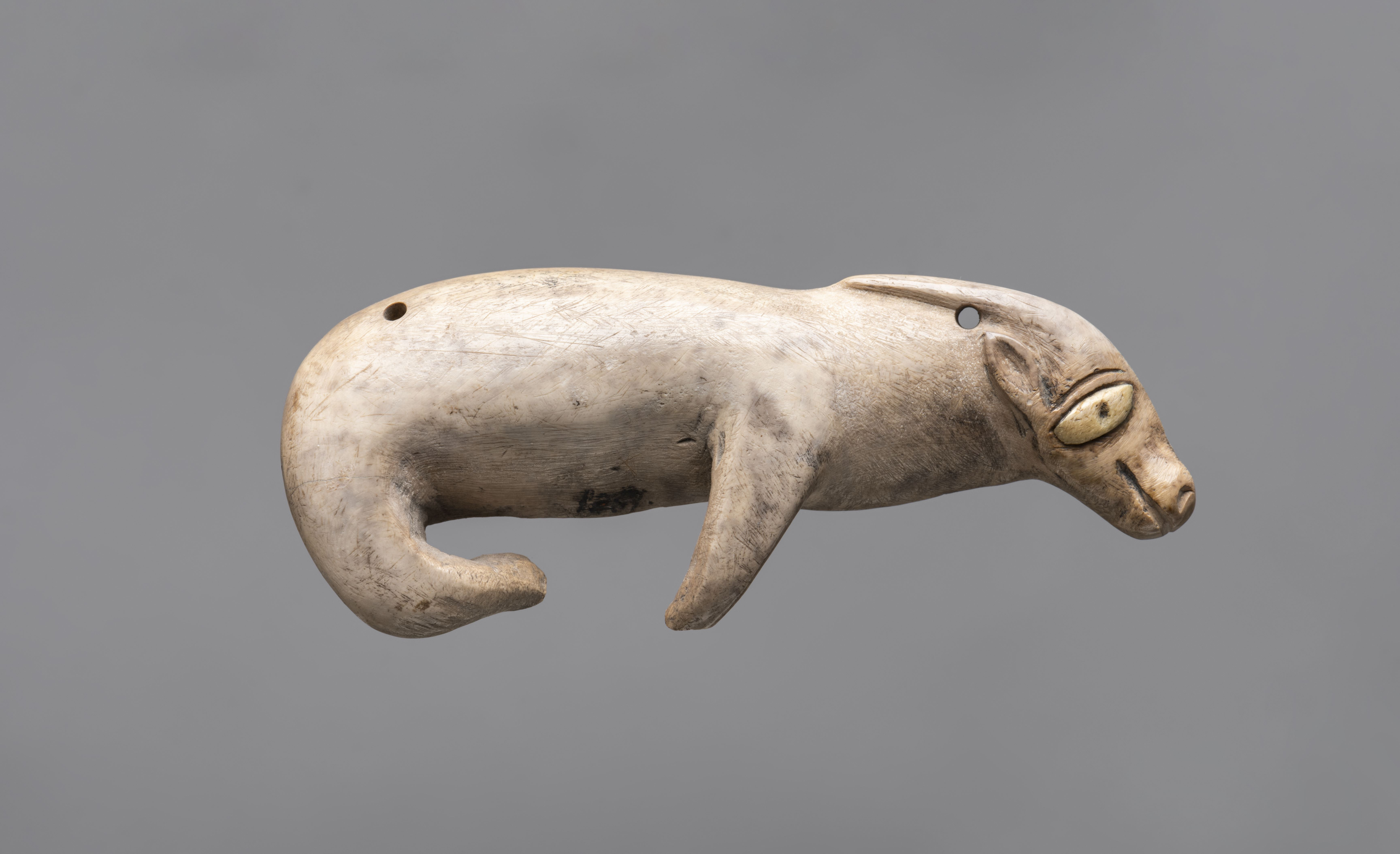
Ivory cosmetic container in the form of an animal, possibly an oryx, provenance unknown, Predynastic Period, 3900–3300 BC. Museo Egizio, Turin (S. 1067).

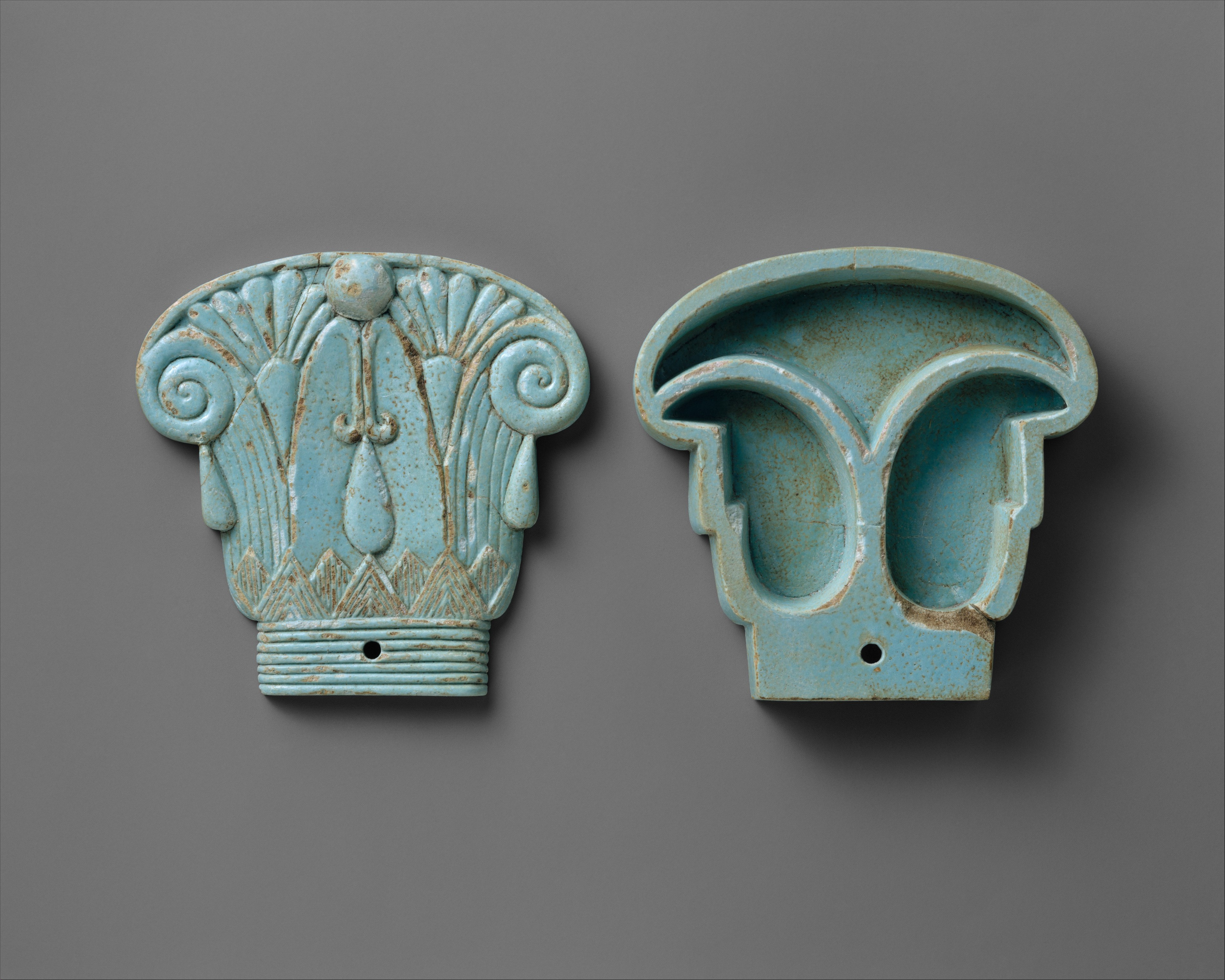
Glassy-faience cosmetic box in the shape of a composite capital, Late Period–Ptolemaic Period, 664–300 BC. Metropolitan Museum of Art (1999.213a, b).

=== Applicators, mirrors and accessories ===
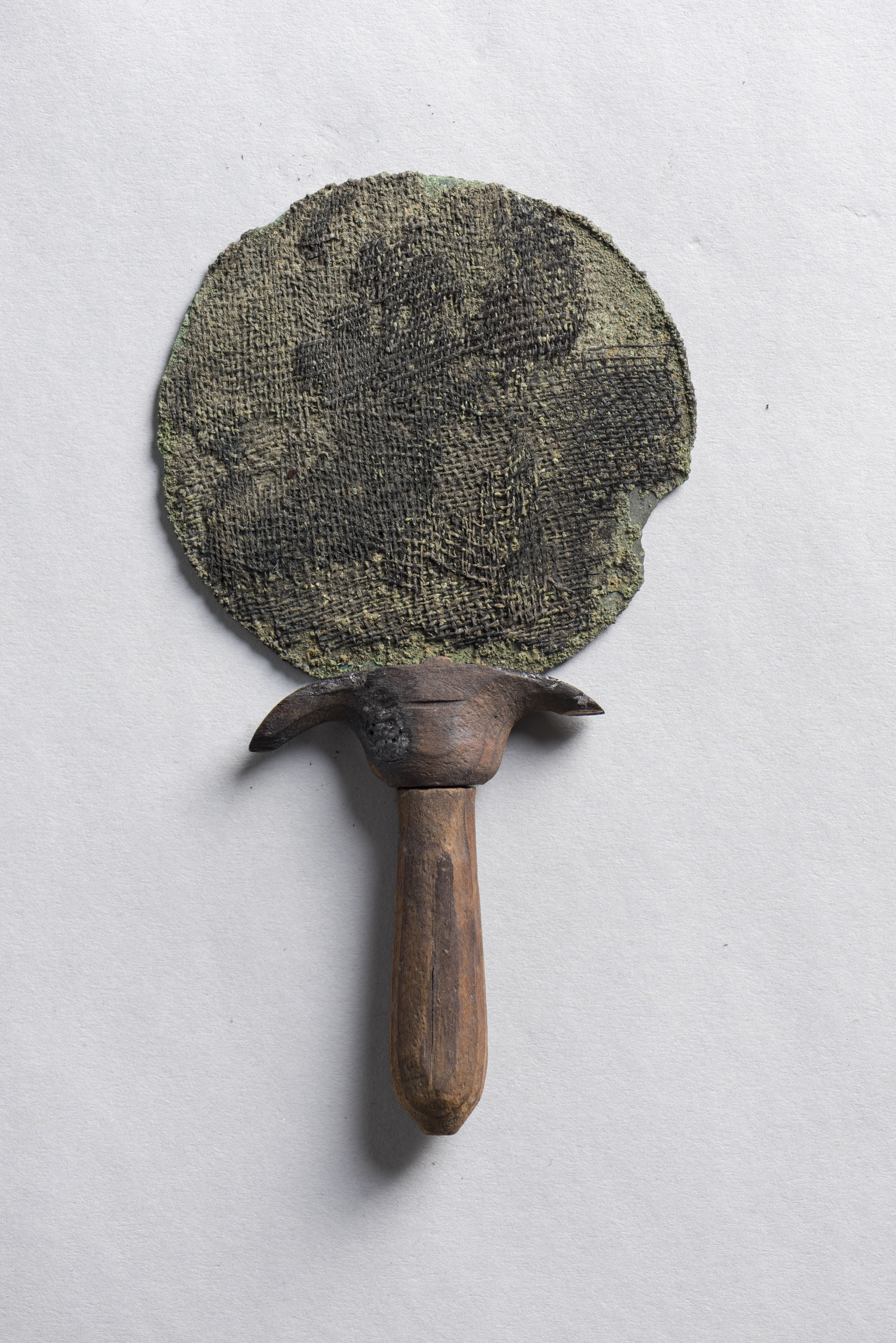
Bronze-and-wood mirror from the Tomb of Iti and Neferu at Gebelein, First Intermediate Period, 2118–1980 BC. Museo Egizio, Turin (S. 13021).

Kohl applicators were slender sticks used to take the cosmetic from tubes or jars and spread it along the outline of the eyes. Surviving examples are made of wood, bone, ivory, reed, glass, copper or copper alloys, and a container and applicator could form a single set. Mirrors used for grooming generally consisted of a polished metal disc, usually copper or bronze, mounted on a handle of wood, ivory, metal or another material. In funerary assemblages, mirrors could lie beside boxes, combs, jars and jewellery; grave goods could include possessions already used during life. Combs, hairpins, razors, tweezers and other grooming accessories occur in male and female burials, often together with wigs, pins and toilet boxes. The Tomb of Kha and Merit, for example, preserves combs, hairpins, razors and toilet containers together with tweezers and other grooming tools.

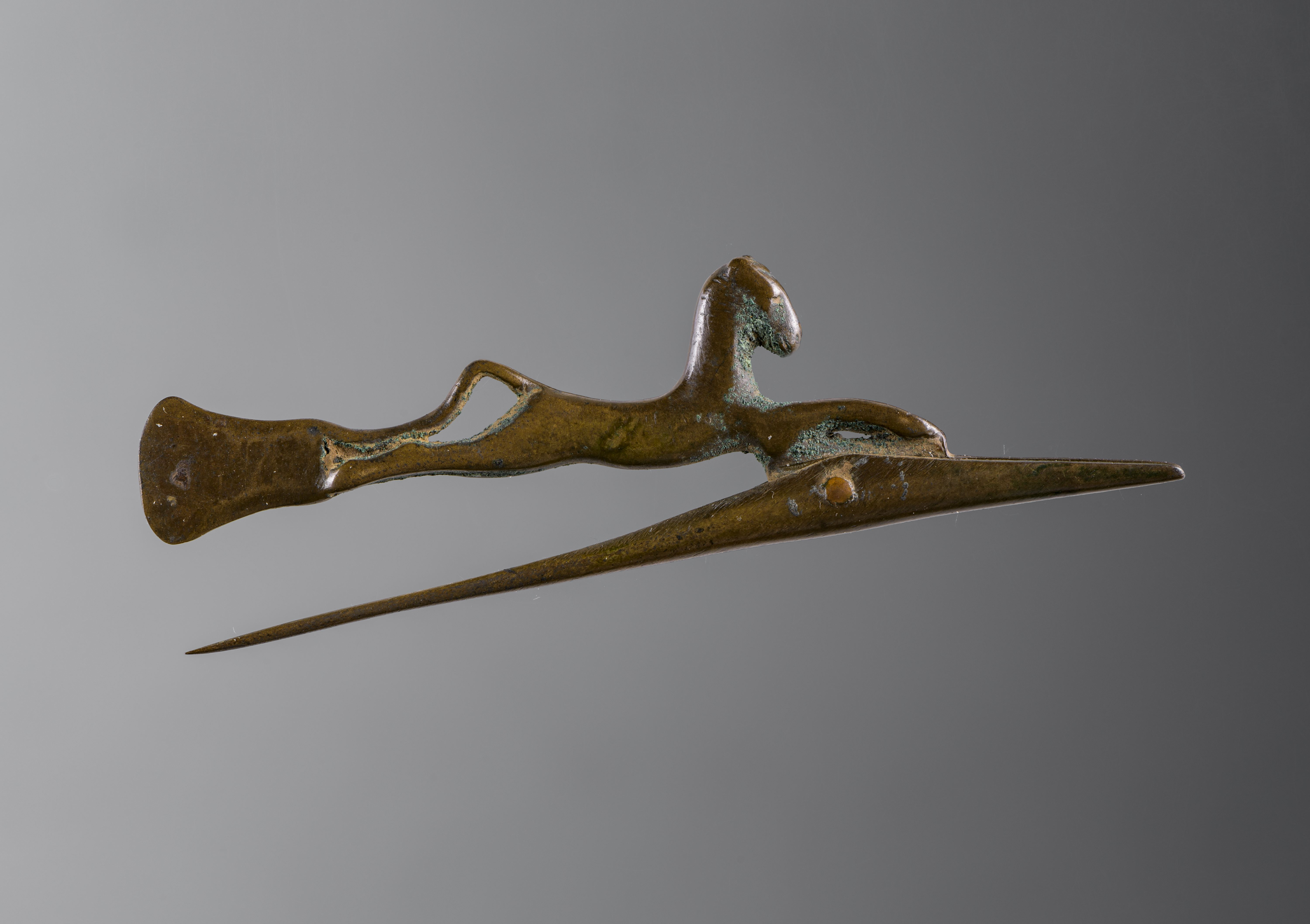
Bronze tweezers or curling tongs from the Tomb of Kha and Merit at Deir el-Medina, New Kingdom, Eighteenth Dynasty, 1425–1353 BC. Museo Egizio, Turin (S. 8376).

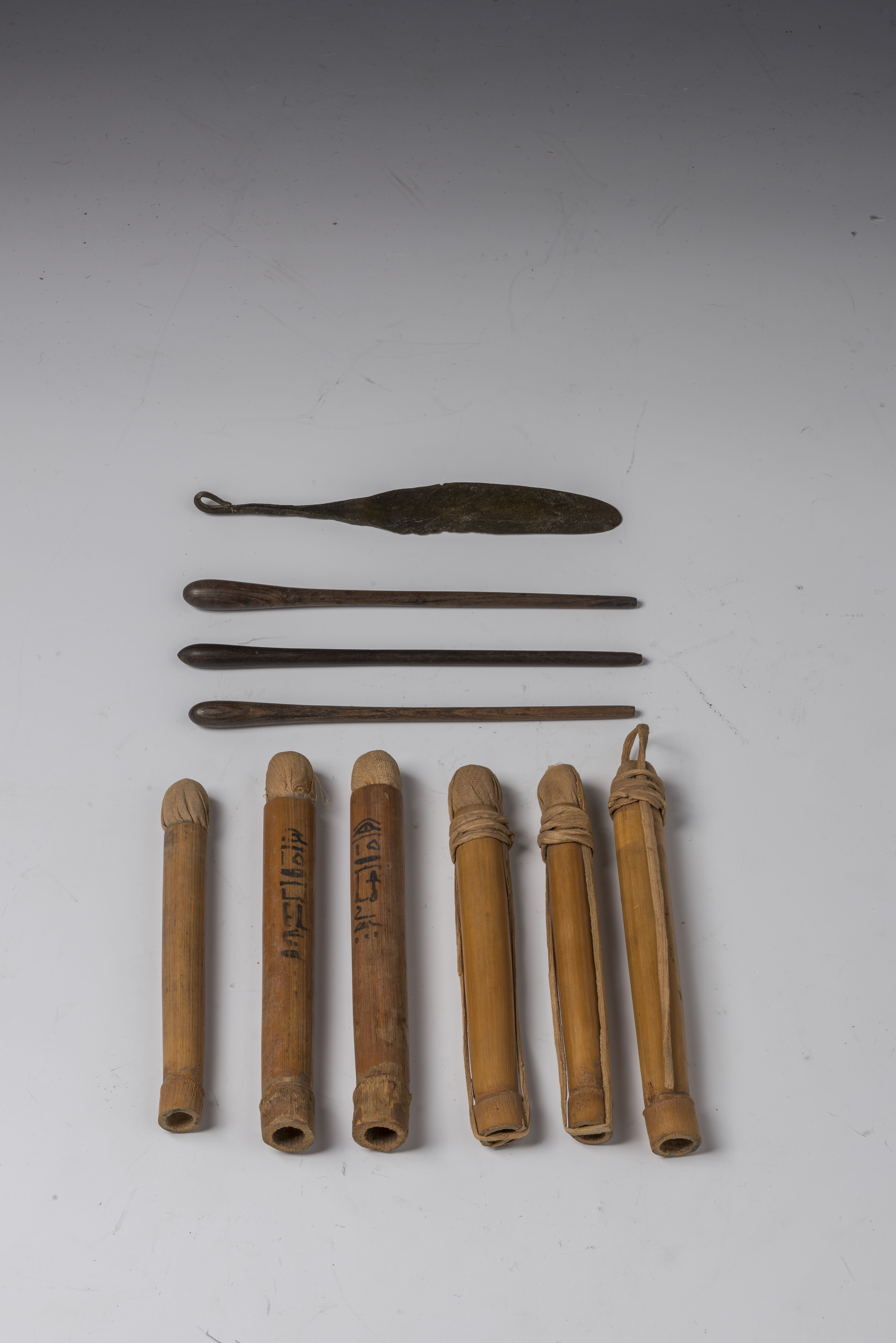
Leaf-shaped bronze spatula and other kohl implements from the Tomb of Kha and Merit, Deir el-Medina, New Kingdom, Eighteenth Dynasty, 1425–1353 BC. Museo Egizio, Turin (S. 8612).

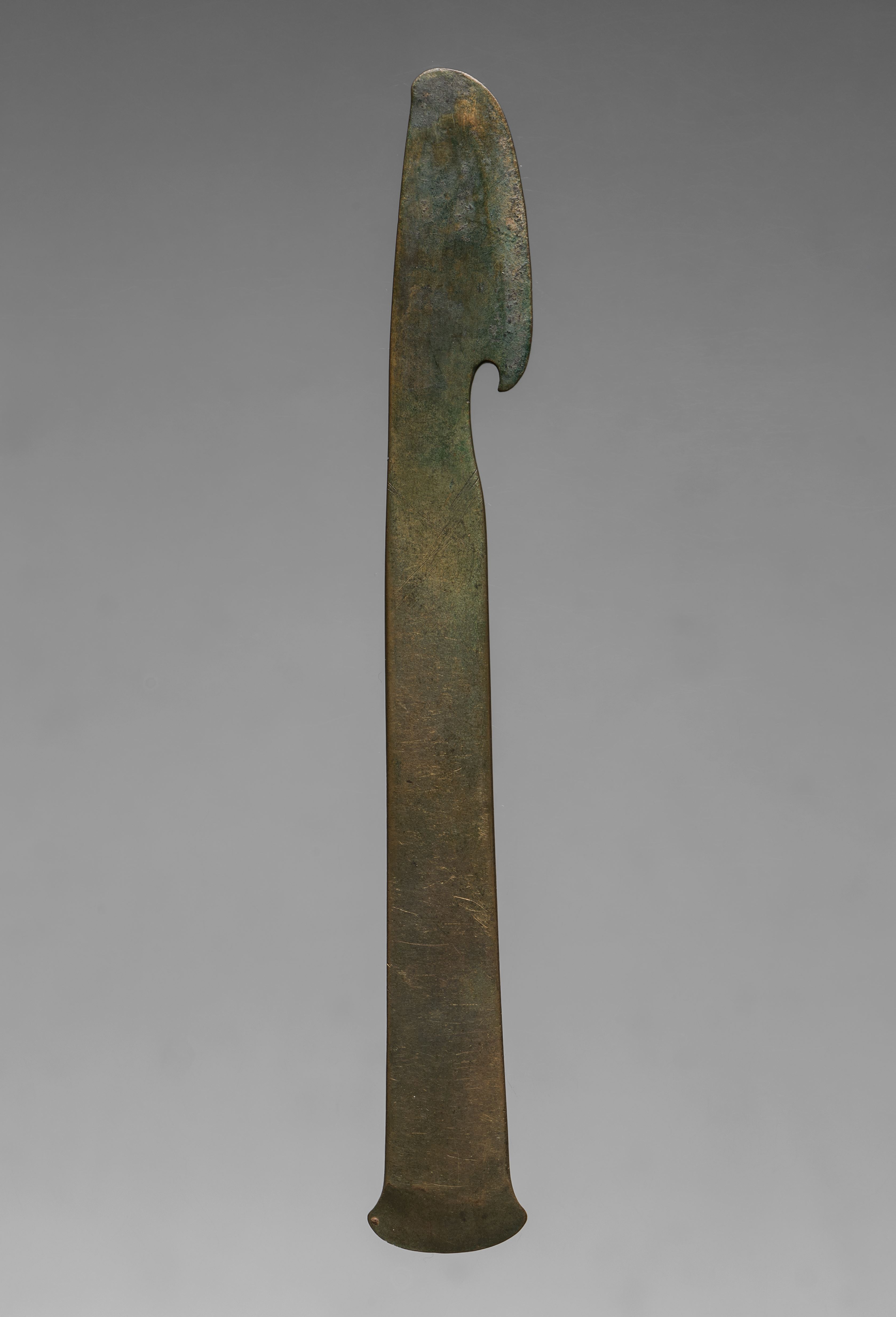
Copper hook-bladed razor from the Tomb of Kha and Merit, Deir el-Medina, New Kingdom, Eighteenth Dynasty, 1425–1353 BC. Museo Egizio, Turin (S. 8373).

== Hair care and wigs ==
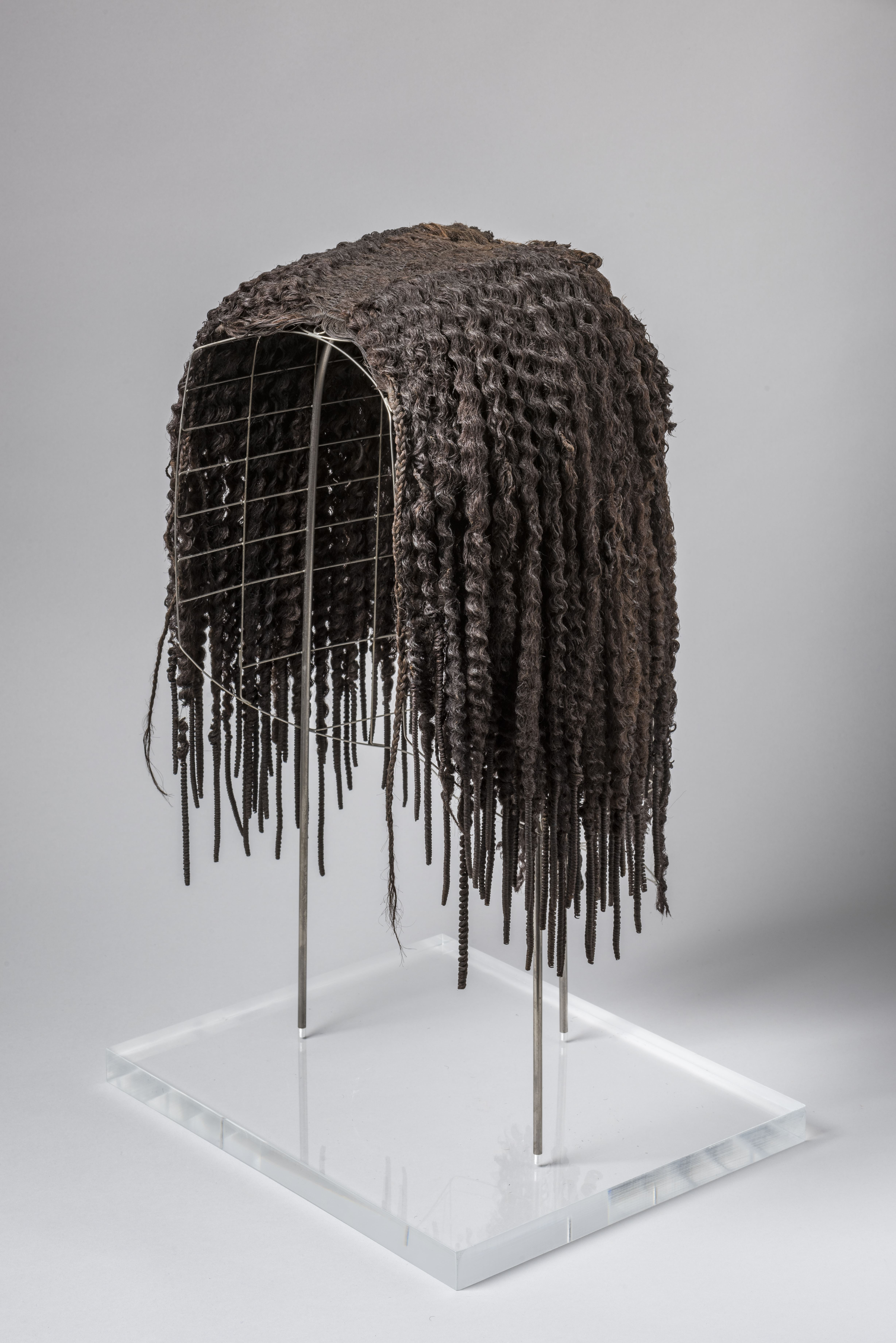
Merit's human-hair wig from the Tomb of Kha and Merit at Deir el-Medina, New Kingdom, Eighteenth Dynasty, 1425–1353 BC. Museo Egizio, Turin (S. 8499).

Hair grooming involved combs, hairpins and razors, as well as fatty or scented substances, wigs and extensions. The Tomb of Kha and Merit, found intact at Deir el-Medina in 1906, contained more than five hundred objects, combining items made for burial with possessions the couple had used during life. Merit's belongings included a cosmetic box, her wig and its wooden container, and two baskets holding hairpins, razors and wooden combs. The wig, made entirely of human hair, was built around a narrow braid that formed the parting; locks about 54 cm long were tied to it at right angles and then worked into braided sections. The hairstyle has a central parting and curls ending in braids at the sides of the face and at the nape. Its 110 cm-high acacia-wood box allowed the wig to hang from two linen-covered wooden supports.

A male wig in the British Museum, also made of human hair, has a net base of plaited hair; the net was stiffened with a mixture of two-thirds beeswax and one-third imported conifer resin, and hundreds of individual locks were attached to it. Some later wigs contain internal padding of palm fibre or grass, which is absent from the British Museum wig. A netted construction could shield a shaved or short-haired head from direct sunlight while allowing heat to escape. Shaving or shortening natural hair could also make it easier to remove head lice and their eggs with the fine teeth of combs. Complete wigs required considerable labor and expense and are chiefly associated with men and women of higher social rank; they also allowed elaborate hairstyles. In funerary and banquet images, wigs, head cones, jewellery and lotus flowers appear together as elements of personal adornment.

Vegetable oil and a small amount of balm were identified in the lower parts of Merit's wig locks. Residues between the teeth of one of her combs contained vegetable oil, plant gum, balm, beeswax and cholesterol. Because cholesterol occurs in appreciable amounts on the scalp and at hair roots, its presence between the comb teeth suggests that the comb had been used during Merit's lifetime. Wigs could be placed in funerary assemblages or fitted to mummies; styled natural hair and extensions are also preserved on some bodies.

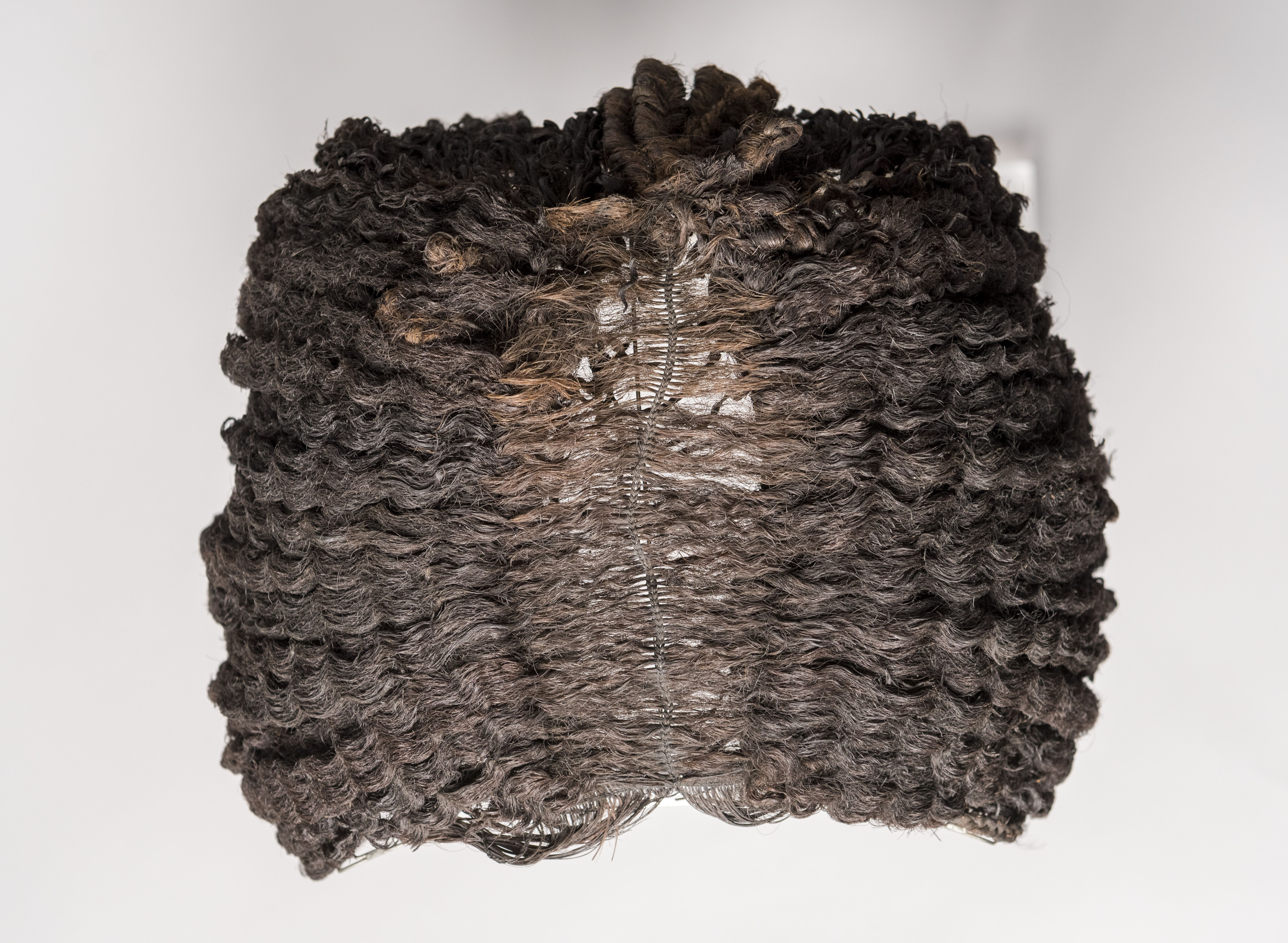
Merit's wig, viewed from above, from the Tomb of Kha and Merit at Deir el-Medina, New Kingdom, Eighteenth Dynasty, 1425–1353 BC. Museo Egizio, Turin (S. 8499).

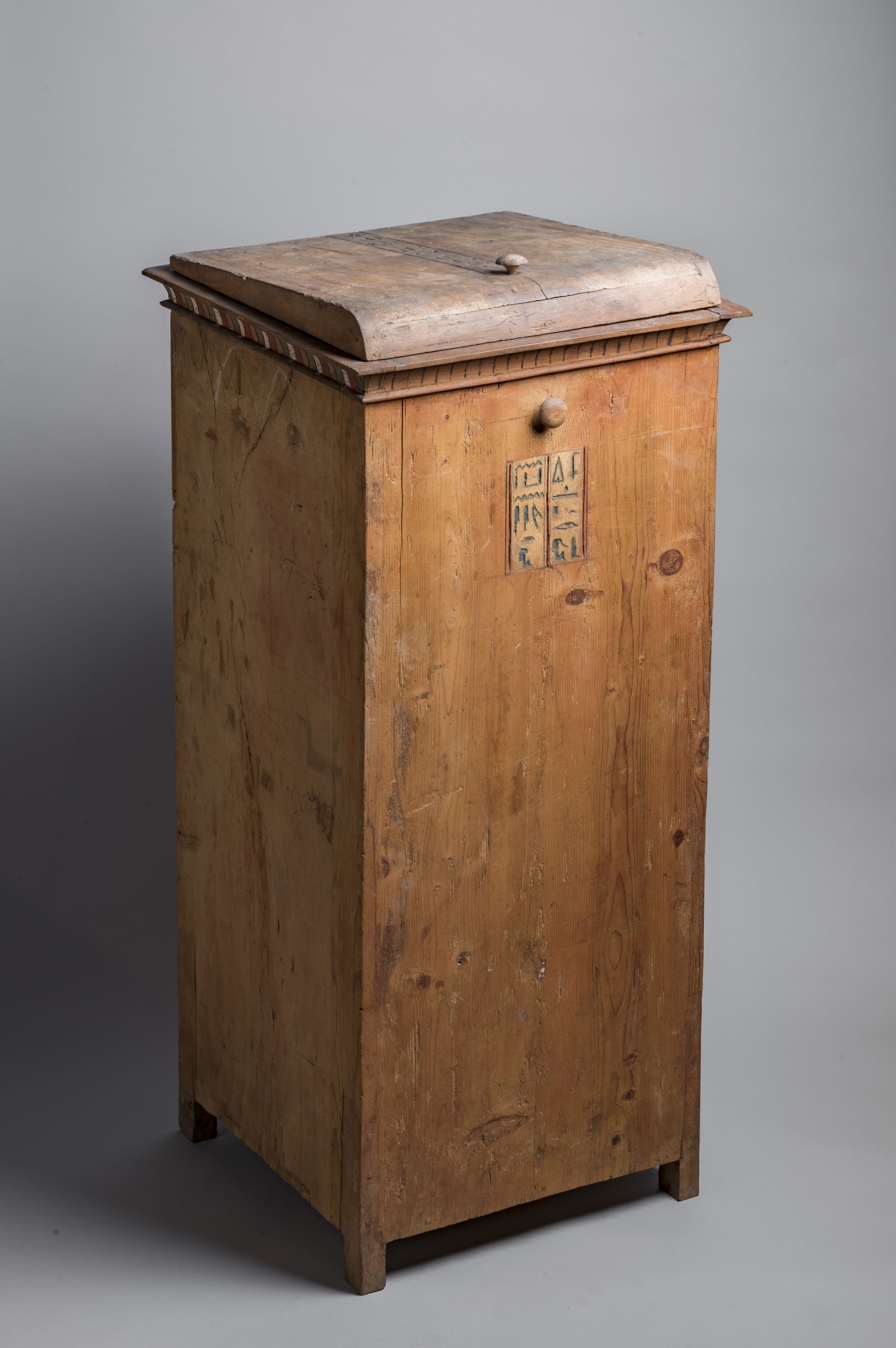
Wooden box for Merit's wig, from the Tomb of Kha and Merit at Deir el-Medina, New Kingdom, Eighteenth Dynasty, 1425–1353 BC. Museo Egizio, Turin (S. 8493).

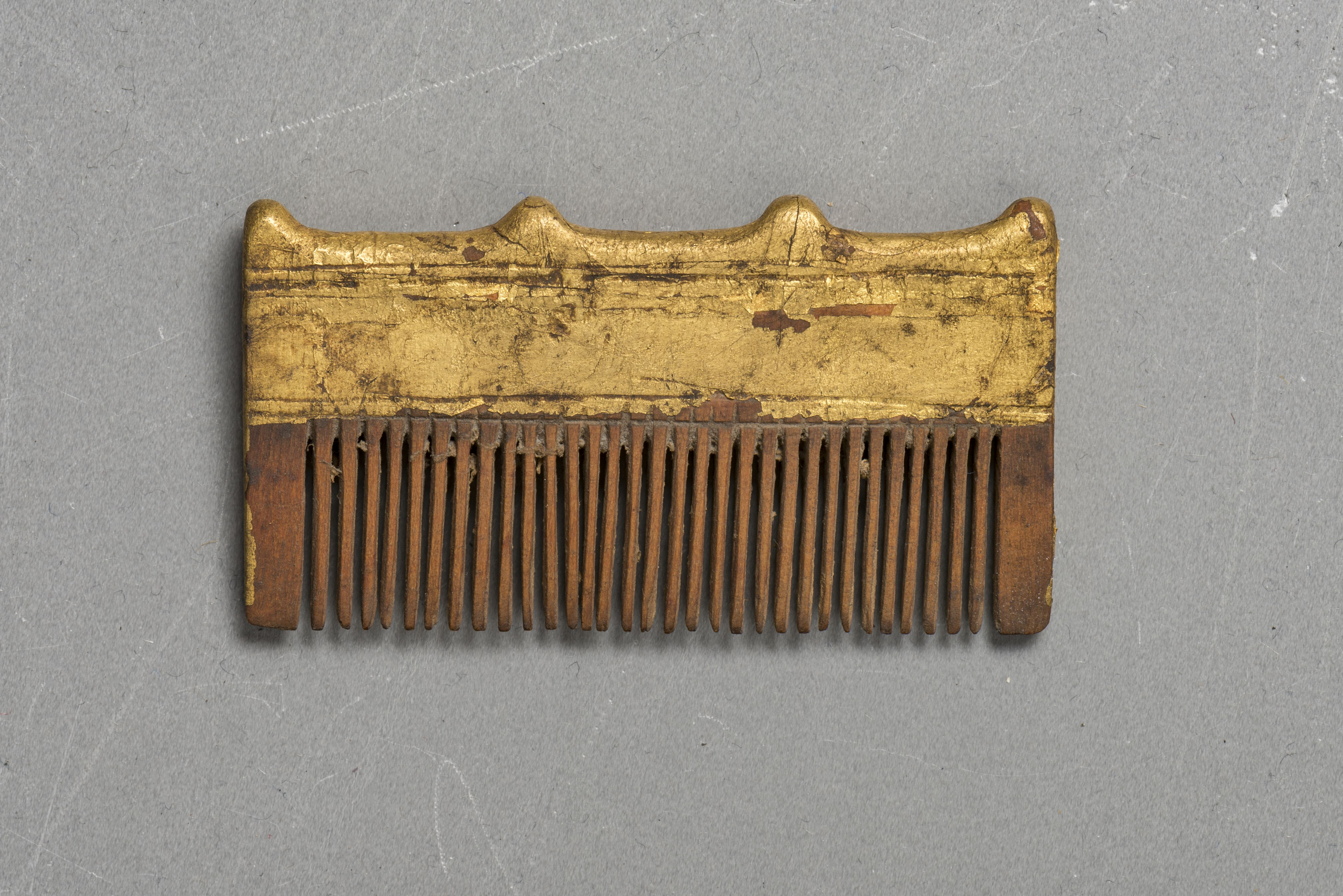
Wooden comb from the Tomb of Kha and Merit at Deir el-Medina, New Kingdom, Eighteenth Dynasty, 1425–1353 BC. Museo Egizio, Turin (S. 8482).

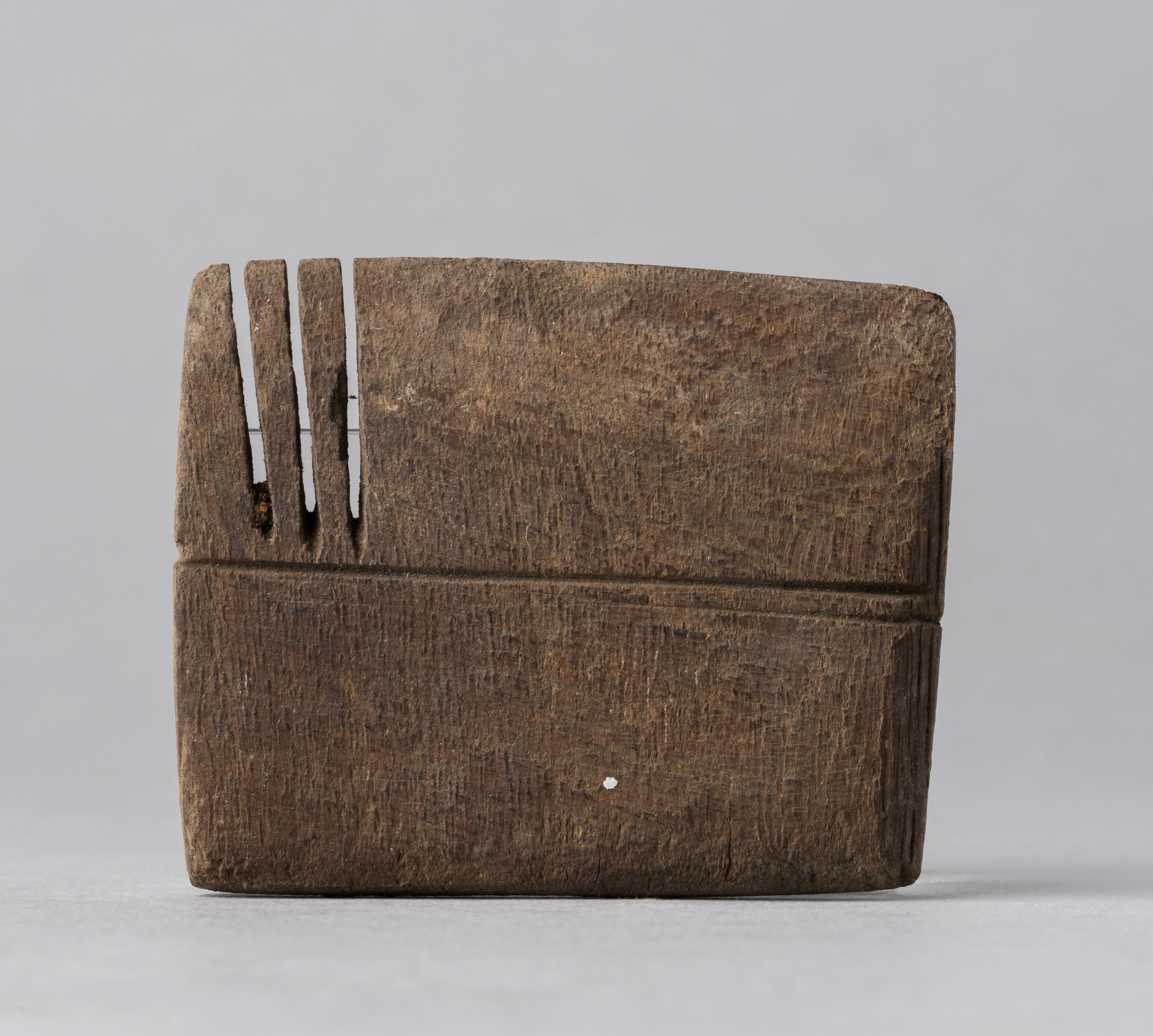
Wooden comb. Museo Egizio, Turin (S. 7624/02).

== Tattoos ==
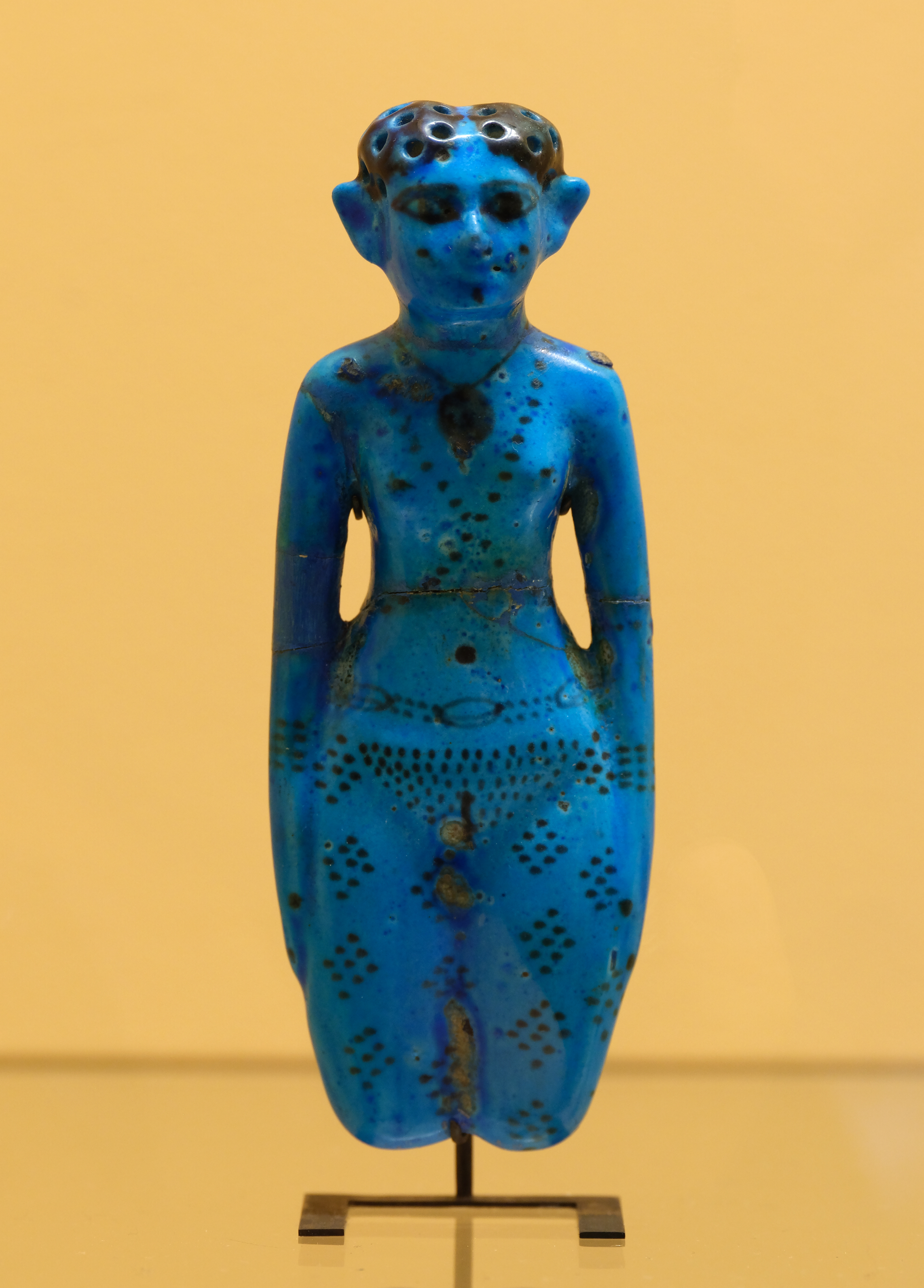
Female siliceous-faience figurine with black decoration on the body, Middle Kingdom, Louvre Museum (E 10942).

Tattooing in ancient Egypt and Nubia is known from both mummified human remains and images, while Egyptian written sources rarely mention it. The earliest Egyptian human remains on which tattoos have been securely identified date at least to the Middle Kingdom. Some Predynastic figurines carry geometric patterns that have been interpreted as possible tattoos, but preserved human bodies from that phase are lacking to test the interpretation. Tattooed female mummies from Deir el-Bahari, dated to the Middle Kingdom, have patterns of dots and lines on the arms, legs and abdomen. Among tattooed remains catalogued by 2003, female bodies predominated, and no tools used to make the tattoos had then been securely identified at Egyptian archaeological sites.

At Deir el-Medina, the mummified torso of a New Kingdom woman was recognized in 2014 as bearing at least thirty tattoos across the neck, shoulders, arms and back; in 2016, infrared imaging revealed additional marks that were not visible to the naked eye. Identifiable motifs include baboons, wedjat eyes, cobras, lotus flowers and imagery connected with Hathor. Some symbols may have had a protective function, while motifs associated with Hathor point to religious practice; the woman's precise social or cultic role cannot be established. Two other tattooed female mummified remains from Deir el-Medina and three clay figurines carry comparable motifs. Images of Bes, Nilotic elements and rows of dots on the neck recur in both the human remains and the figurines, sometimes in corresponding areas of the body.

== Head cones ==
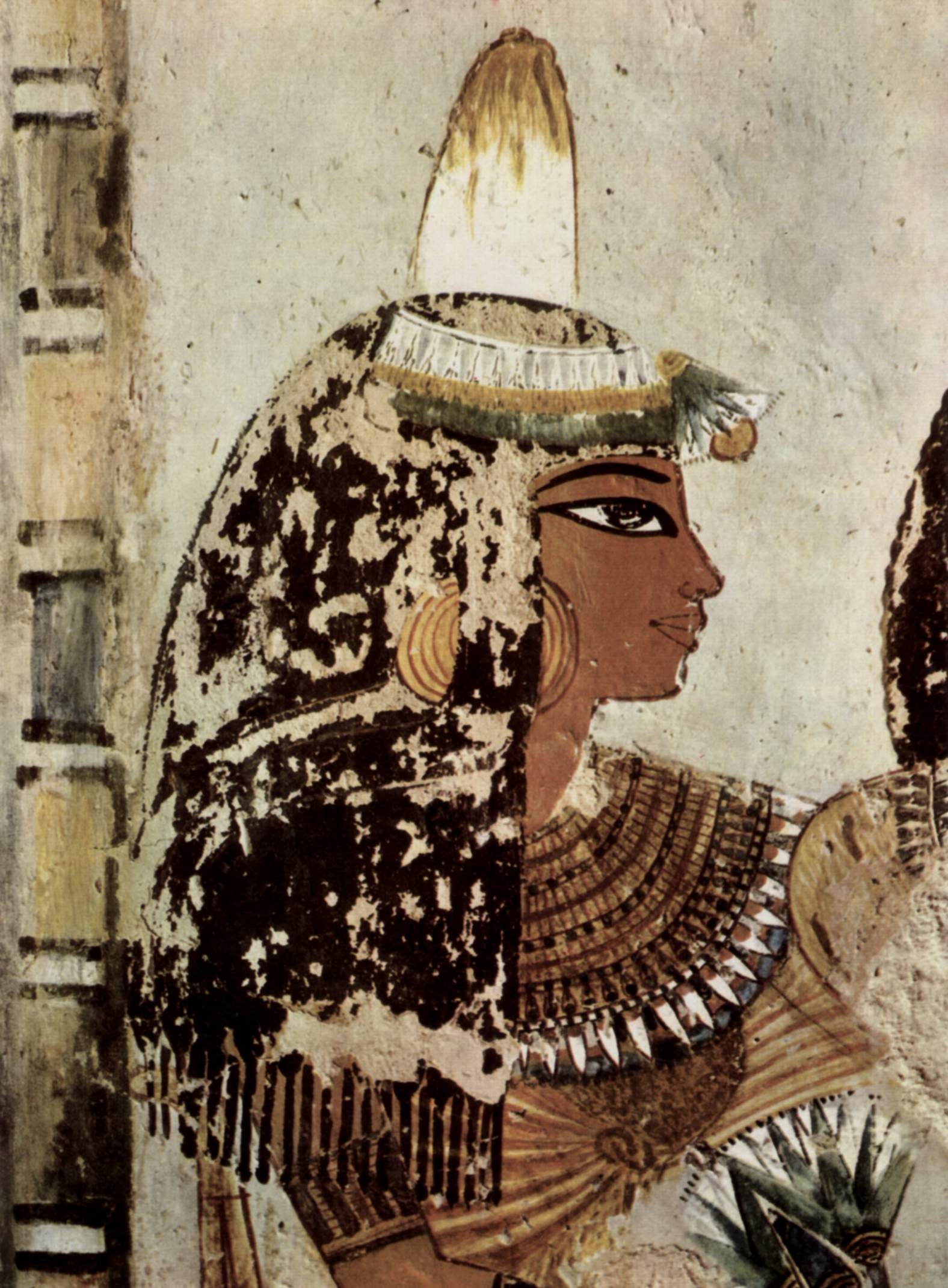
Woman wearing a head cone in the tomb of Menna, Theban Necropolis, New Kingdom, Eighteenth Dynasty, reigns of Thutmose IV and Amenhotep III, c. 1400–1352 BC.

Figures wearing a cone on the head recur in scenes of banqueting, music, offering and funerary cult; examples survive in the tomb of Sennedjem and in a Theban wall-painting fragment at the Walters Art Museum. Before the finds from the cemeteries at Amarna, head cones were known only from images, without physical evidence that they had actually been worn as objects. Excavations in the Amarna cemeteries produced the first physical examples, showing that at least at that site the cones existed as real objects; spectroscopic analysis identified their principal component as a biological wax rather than primarily fat or incense. Their function cannot be determined from the finds; they may have been connected with the deceased person's rebirth or fertility in the afterlife.

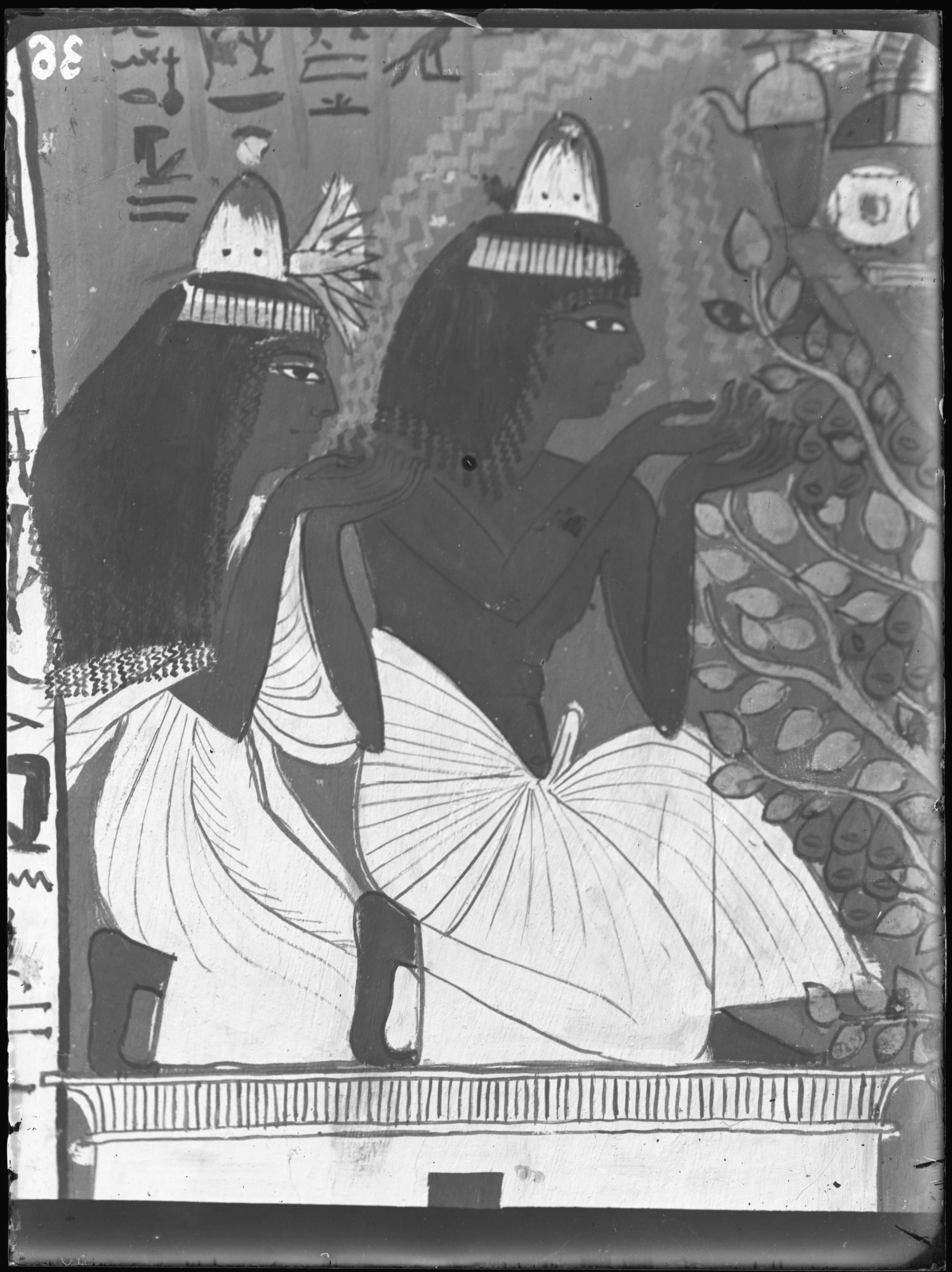
Sennedjem and his wife Iyneferti in the afterlife, wearing head cones, tomb of Sennedjem at Deir el-Medina, New Kingdom, Nineteenth Dynasty. Museo Egizio photographic archive, Turin (B00036).

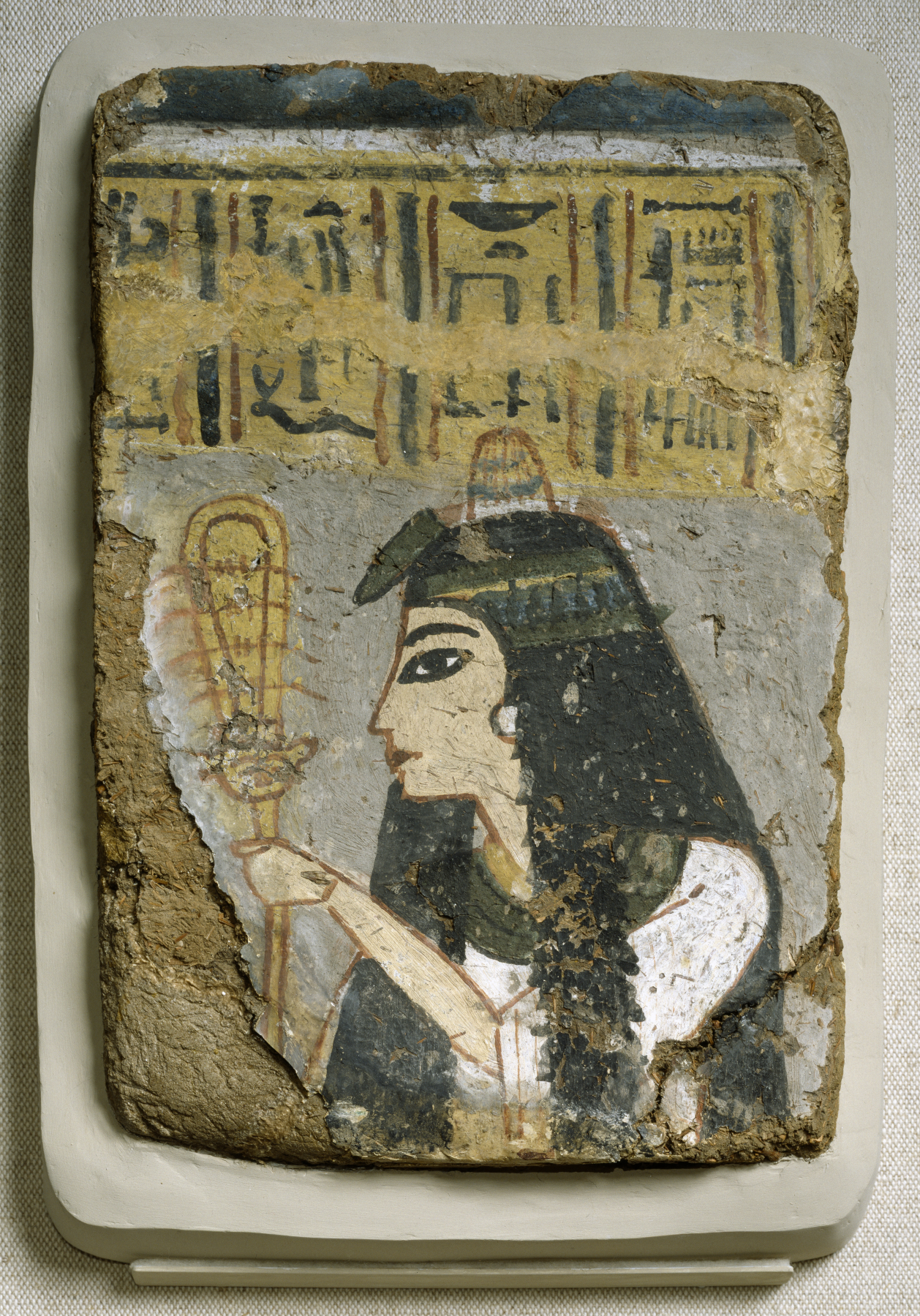
Wall-painting fragment showing a woman holding a sistrum and wearing a head cone, Thebes, New Kingdom, Eighteenth Dynasty. Walters Art Museum (32.9).

== See also ==
- Clothing in ancient Egypt
- Art of ancient Egypt
- Cosmetics
- Hathor
- Kohl
- Perfume
- Tattoo
- Narmer Palette
- Ointment

== Bibliography ==
- Austin, Anne; Arnette, Marie-Lys (2022). "Of Ink and Clay: Tattooed Mummified Human Remains and Female Figurines from Deir el-Medina". The Journal of Egyptian Archaeology. 108 (1–2): 63–80. doi:10.1177/03075133221130089.
- Austin, Anne; Gobeil, Cédric (2017). "Embodying the Divine: A Tattooed Female Mummy from Deir el-Medina". Bulletin de l'Institut français d'archéologie orientale. 116: 23–46. doi:10.4000/bifao.296.
- Auenmüller, Johannes (2023). "The "Lost" Calcite Alabaster Vessels of Princess Nbw-m-tḫ in Turin (Cat. 3254 and 3255)". Rivista del Museo Egizio. 7. doi:10.29353/rime.2023.4797.
- Buckley, Stephen; Fletcher, Joann (2016). "The Hair and Wig of Meryt: Grooming in the 18th Dynasty". Internet Archaeology (42). doi:10.11141/ia.42.6.4.
- Fletcher, Joann; Salamone, Filippo (2016). "An Ancient Egyptian Wig: Construction and Reconstruction". Internet Archaeology (42). doi:10.11141/ia.42.6.3.
- Lucas, Alfred (1930). "Cosmetics, Perfumes and Incense in Ancient Egypt". The Journal of Egyptian Archaeology. 16 (1–2): 41–53. doi:10.1177/030751333001600112.
- Maravelia, Alicia; Faviou, Elsa; Magiorkinis, Emmanuel; Filianos, Markos (2024). "Laboratory testing of the antimicrobial effects of kyphi on a variety of micro-organisms" (PDF). Prague Egyptological Studies. 32: 23–48.
- Metwaly, Ahmed M.; Ghoneim, Mohammed M.; Eissa, Ibrahim H.; Elsehemy, Islam A.; Mostafa, Ahmad E.; Hegazy, Mostafa M.; Afifi, Wael M.; Dou, Deqiang (2021). "Traditional ancient Egyptian medicine: A review". Saudi Journal of Biological Sciences. 28 (10): 5823–5832. doi:10.1016/j.sjbs.2021.06.044. PMC 8459052.
- Ragai, Jehane (2018). "Snapshots of chemical practices in Ancient Egypt". Substantia. 2 (1): 93–101. doi:10.13128/Substantia-43.
- Riesmeier, Marabel; Keute, Jennifer; Veall, Margaret-Ashley; Borschneck, Daniel; Stevenson, Alice; Garnett, Anna; Williams, Alice; Ragan, Maria; Devièse, Thibaut (2022). "Recipes of Ancient Egyptian kohls more diverse than previously thought". Scientific Reports. 12. 5932. doi:10.1038/s41598-022-08669-0. PMC 8994005.
- Serpico, Margaret, ed. (2016). Beyond Beauty: Transforming the Body in Ancient Egypt (PDF). London: Two Temple Place.
- Stevens, Anna; Rogge, Corina E.; Bos, Jolanda E. M. F.; Dabbs, Gretchen R. (2019). "From representation to reality: ancient Egyptian wax head cones from Amarna". Antiquity. 93 (372): 1515–1533. doi:10.15184/aqy.2019.175.
- Tassie, Geoffrey J. (2003). "Identifying the Practice of Tattooing in Ancient Egypt and Nubia". Papers from the Institute of Archaeology. 14 (1): 85–101. doi:10.5334/pia.200.
- Tapsoba, Issa; Arbault, Stéphane; Walter, Philippe; Amatore, Christian (2010). "Finding Out Egyptian Gods' Secret Using Analytical Chemistry: Biomedical Properties of Egyptian Black Makeup Revealed by Amperometry at Single Cells". Analytical Chemistry. 82 (2): 457–460. doi:10.1021/ac902348g.
- Walter, Philippe; Martinetto, Pauline; Tsoucaris, Georges; Bréniaux, R.; Lefebvre, M. A.; Richard, G.; Talabot, J.; Dooryhée, Eric (1999). "Making make-up in Ancient Egypt". Nature. 397: 483–484. doi:10.1038/17240.
