= TT2 =

Ancient Egyptian tomb

Coordinates: 25.7333°N 32.6000°E

Theban tomb TT2
- Burial site of Khabekhnet
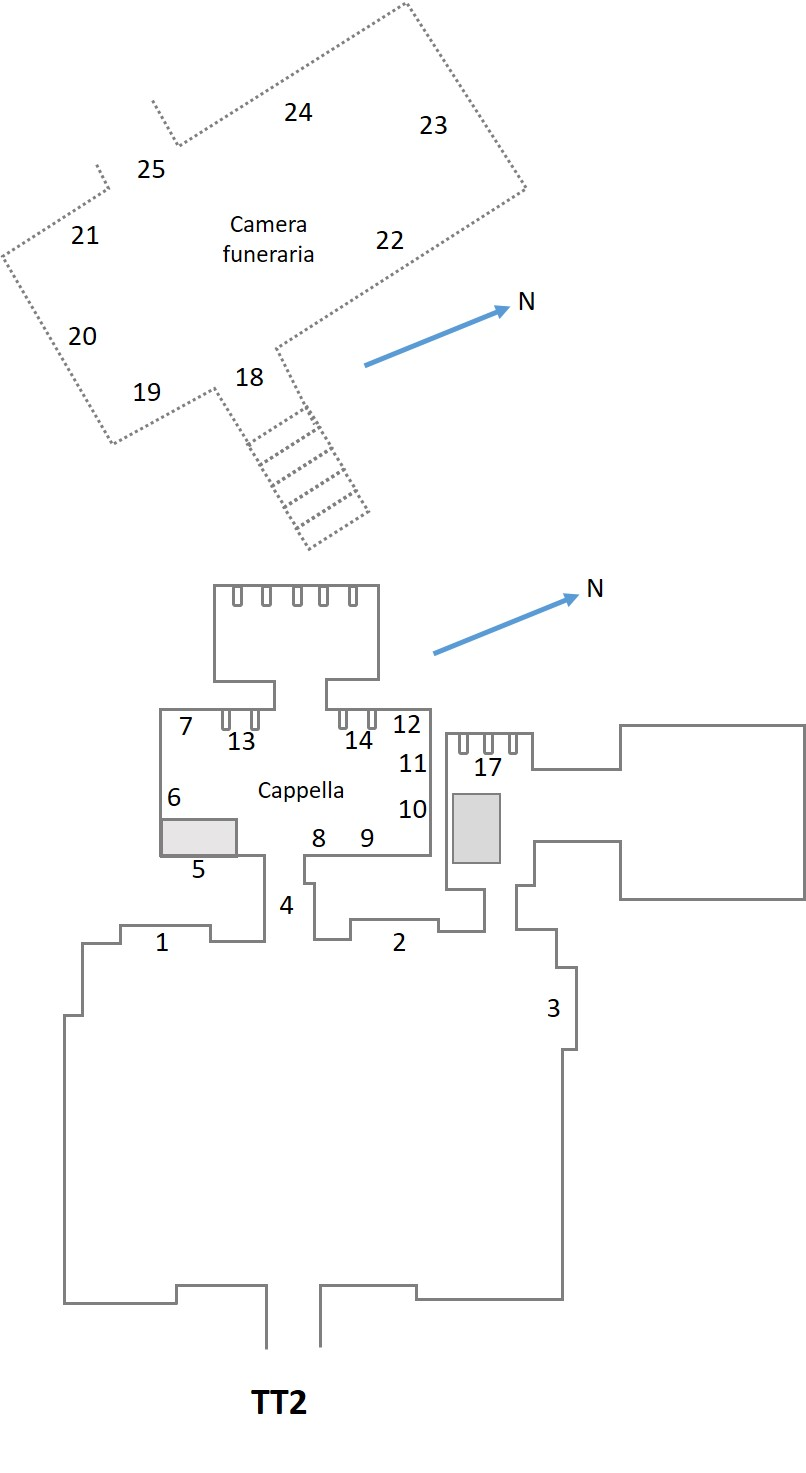
- Floor plan of TT2

- Location within Egypt
- Location: Deir el-Medina, Theban Necropolis
- Discovered: Open in antiquity 1917 (TT2B)
- Excavated by: Jacques Lecomte-Dunouy (1917); Institut Français d'Archéologie Orientale (1922); Bernard Bruyère (1927); Anne-Clair Salmas and Alexandra Winkels (2010s-)
- ← Previous; TT1 Next → TT3

Theban Tomb TT2 is the burial place of the ancient Egyptian official Khabekhnet and his family in Deir el-Medina, part of the Theban Necropolis, on the west bank of the Nile, opposite to Luxor. The two adjoining tomb-chapels were intended for Khabekhnet and his brother Khonsu; Khonsu was ultimately buried nearby in their parents funerary complex, TT1, possibly due to unstable rock in the tomb below his chapel. Only the southern chapel was decorated, and only the subterranean rooms of the northern chapel, TT2B, were decorated. The chapel's relief decoration is shared equally between Khabekhnet and Khonsu but the completed burial chamber of TT2B mentions only Khabekhnet. Fragments of burial equipment indicate he was buried there along with his wife, Sahte; the robbed tomb was reused in antiquity and later became a hermitage in the Christian era.

TT2 was excavated in the early 1900s, and in 1917 the TT2B burial chamber was discovered in excavations led by Jacques Lecomte-Dunouy for the Institut Français d'Archéologie Orientale; the complex was further excavated in the 1920s. From the 2010s, a team led by Anne-Claire Salmas from the University of Oxford and Alexandra Winkels from the Dresden Academy of Fine Arts have studied and conserved the complex.

== History ==
Khabekhnet was a Servant in the Place of Truth during the reign of the pharaoh Ramesses II during the Nineteenth Dynasty of Egypt. Khabekhnet was the son of Sennedjem and Iyneferti, who were buried in TT1. His wife was a woman named Sahte, and he was probably also married to his niece Isis, a daughter of his brother Khonsu. His family is mentioned in the tomb.

Situated close to TT1, the family funerary complex, TT2 reused and expanded two earlier Eighteenth Dynasty tombs as chapels, with new burial chambers cut beneath them. The Egyptologists Kathrin Gabler and Anne-Claire Salmas suggest that the chapels were a joint project between Khabekhnet and his brother Khonsu, as the decoration depicts both men. Khonsu never used TT2, as he had a chapel built in the TT1 complex and was buried there. He may have died before his own tomb was completed, or abandoned the project due to the unstable rock below the southern chapel. The burial chamber, TT2B, belongs to the northern chapel and its decoration only mentions Khabekhnet.

The burial chamber TT2B was reused in the Graeco-Roman era, and a wall was built across the court. A second wall was built to divide the court into two unequal halves during the Christian era, when the complex was used as a double hermitage by Coptic monks.

In 1917, TT2B was found and excavated by Jacques Lecomte-Dunouy of the Institut Français d'Archéologie Orientale (IFAO). In 1922, the IFAO excavated the chambers below the southern chapel. In 1927, Bernard Bruyère re-cleared TT2B.

Since the 2010s, Anne-Claire Salmas from the University of Oxford, and Alexandra Winkels from the Dresden Academy of Fine Arts have studied and conserved the complex.

== Chapels ==
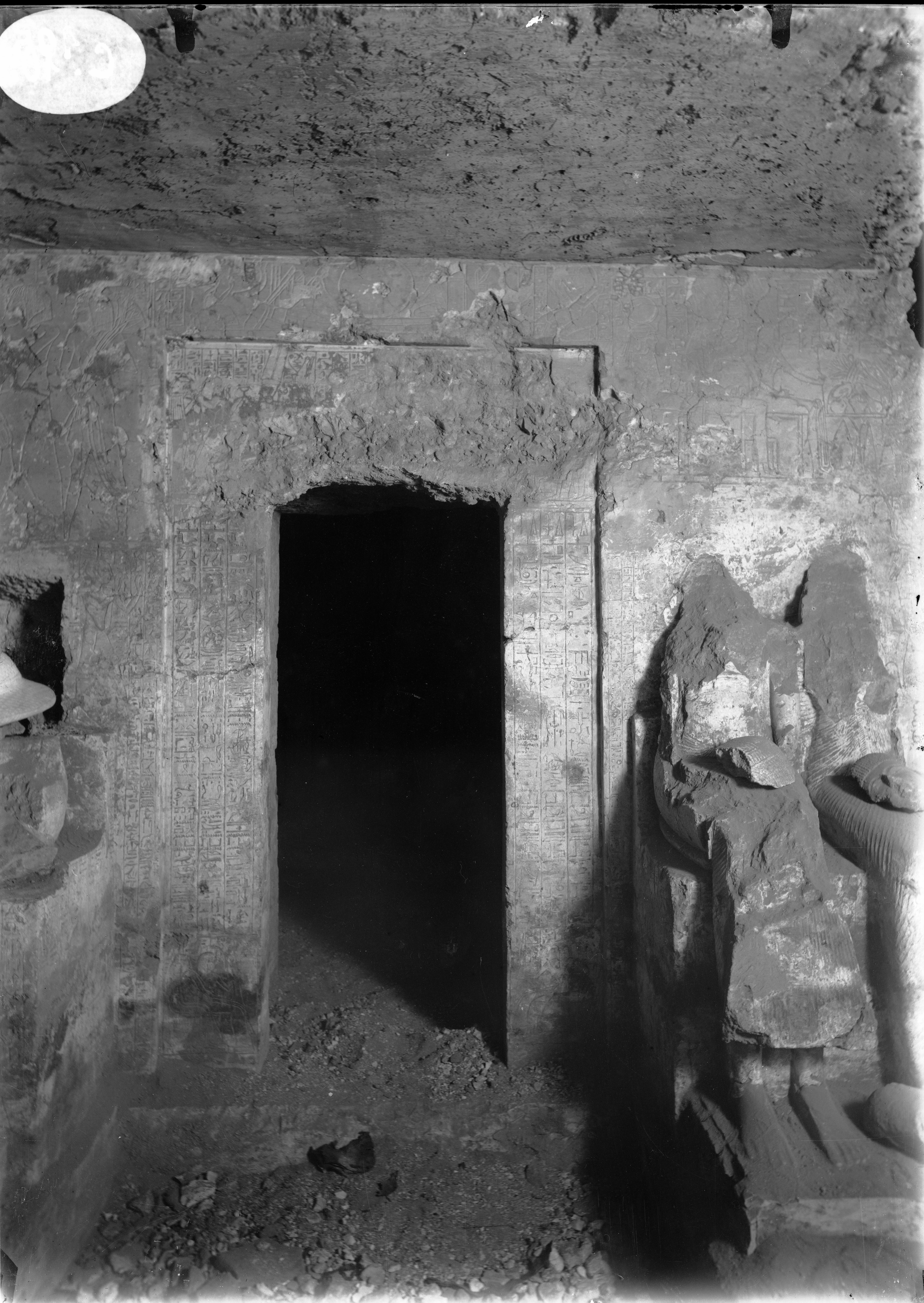
Statues of Khabekhnet and Sahte flanking the doorway to the inner room of the southern TT2 chapel

TT2 is at the southern end of the cemetery of the workmen's village of Deir el-Medina. It sits on the slope above TT1, where members of Khabekhnet's family were buried. The complex consists of two chapels at the back of a large courtyard. The courtyard is terraced on the eastern side and cut back into the hillside on the northern, western, and eastern sides.

The two chapels (northern and southern) were contained inside a single pyramid-shaped structure fronted by a peristyle porch. A stele was set into the front face of the pyramid; it is now in the British Museum, London. It has three registers: the first depicts the solar god Ra-Horakhty in a barque; the second depicts Khabekhnet adoring a statue of a king and the goddess Hathor as a cow emerging from the Western Mountain; in the lowest register, Khabekhnet and his wife Sahti kneel accompanied by a hymn to Hathor. Two further stelae were set either side of the door of the southern chapel, while a third was set into the north wall of the courtyard. One depicts Khabekhnet and his father Sennedjem kneeling. The text includes hymns to the sun god Ra. Another stela shows the barque of Ra adored by baboons, while in another register Khabekhnet's father and family appear before the deities Horus and Satet. Yet another register depicts Khabekhnet and his wife Sahte before Ahmose I and Queen Ahmose-Nefertari.

The chapels each have two rooms. The southern chapel has a decorated rectangular hall and a pair of statues of Khabekhnet and his wife flanking the doorway to a smaller inner chamber. A burial shaft was cut in the southeastern corner which leads to an undecorated burial suite. The inner room is also decorated and has life-size statues carved from the rock of the rear wall. At the centre is a life-size head of a cow emerging from the wall, flanked by Osiris and Hathor on the left and Horus and Isis on the right.

The northern chapel has a small square room and a larger vaulted chamber which is plastered but undecorated. Like the inner chamber of the southern chapel, the square room has statues carved from the rock. The head of a cow stands over a seated king; they are flanked on the left and right by a god wearing a solar disc and a figure thought to represent Osiris. The entire floor of the first room is occupied by a staircase 4 m (13 ft) deep which leads to the burial chambers.

=== Decoration ===
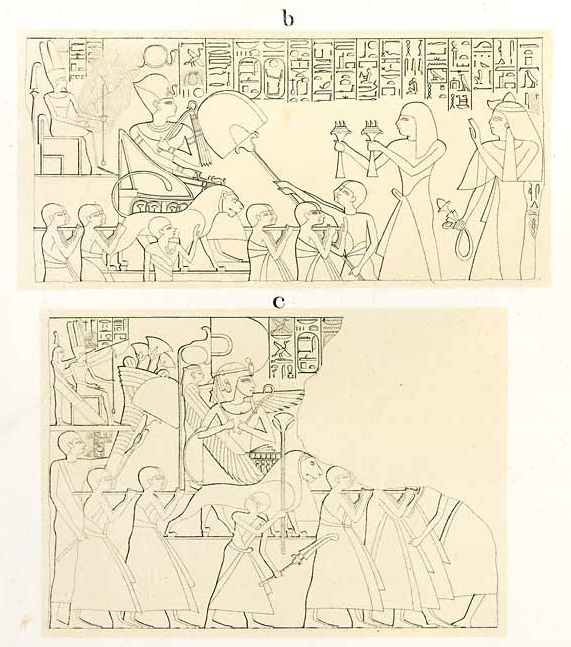
Khabekhnet before statues of Amenhotep I and Amun on the eastern wall (b) and northern wall (c)

Only the southern chapel is decorated. It has incised decoration on a background of pinkish plaster. The scenes are divided equally on an east–west axis between Khabekhnet and his brother Khonsu, with the northern section featuring Khabekhnet and the southern featuring Khonsu. On the left door thickness, Khabekhnet's father Sennedjem kneels before the god Min and a goddess; in a lower register, Khonsu and his wife are shown making an offering to his parents Senendjem and Iyneferti, accompanied by a hymn to Ra. On the right door thickness, the deceased offers candles to Min and Isis, and to their parents.

The wall to the left of the entrance focuses on Khonsu and shows ceremonies in the Temple of Mut at Karnak; these scenes include images of barques and criosphinxes. Another register shows a pilgrimage to Abydos and Khonsu and his wife before the god Osiris. A heart-weighing scene shows Khonsu being led by Horus and Khonsu's wife by Anubis and a funeral procession accompanied by male mourners.

The left end wall has four registers depicting Sennedjem and relatives adoring the Hathor-cow within a shrine, a banqueting scene, and the lowest register shows a funeral procession.

The left side of the long western wall has four registers, partially obscured by the pair of statues against the doorway to the inner room. The uppermost depicts the deceased and his family before Osiris, Isis and Hathor; the other registers are offering scenes.

The wall to the right of the entrance has two sets of scenes. The first is across three registers. The uppermost depicts a couple adoring the gods Ptah and Anubis. In the second, a man presents offerings to Ramose (owner of TT7) and his wife, and to Sennedjem and Iyneferti. The third register shows Qaha (owner of TT360) and his wife receiving offerings. The second scene has four registers. The uppermost depicts Khabekhnet with his wife Sahte presenting lit braziers to a statue of the deified king Amenhotep I in a palanquin carried by priests, and to a statue of the god Amun; the lower registers depict Khabekhet's son Mosi burning incense before his parents, accompanied by family.

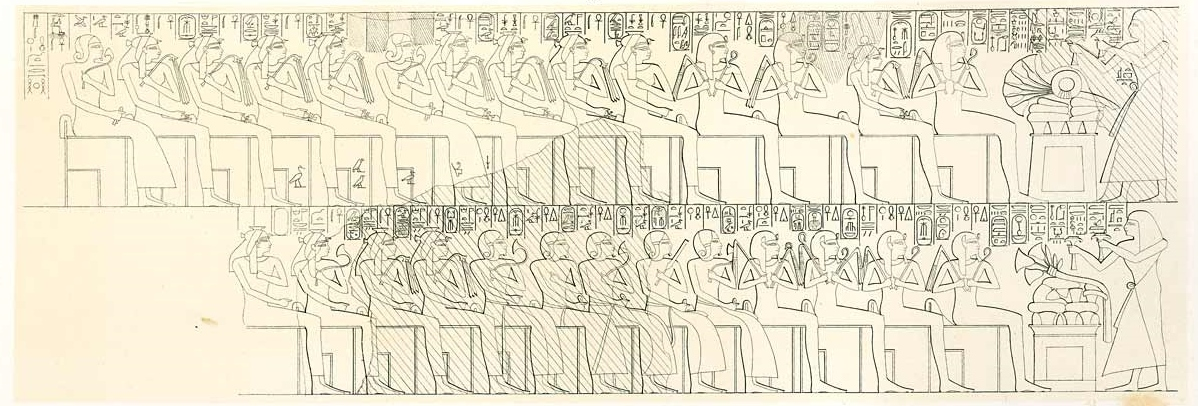
Khabekhnet before kings and queens, north wall

On the short northern wall is a scene showing Khabekhnet offering before two rows of seated kings and queens; this is now in the Berlin Museum (1625). In the upper row, the cartouches identify them as (from right to left) Djeserkare (Amenhotep I), Ahmose-Nefertari, Seqenenre Tao, Ahhotep, king's sister Meritamun, a king's sister, mother of the god Kaesmut, king's sister Sitamun, a king's son (name lost), Royal Lady (name lost), Great king's wife Henuttamehu, king's wife Tures, king's wife Ahmose, king's son Sipair. In the lower row are Nebhepetre Mentuhotep (II), Nebpehtyre Ahmose (I), King Sekhentnebre Ahmose (a misspelling of Senakhtenre), Wadjkheperre Kamose, a king's son Binpu, king's son Wadjmose, king's son Ramose, king's son Nebenkhurru (?), king's son Ahmose, God's wife Kamose, a god's wife Sit-ir-bau, a god's wife Ta-khered-qa, and a god's wife (name lost). In the three lower registers, Khabekhnet appears with his family before gods. The first register of another scene on the same wall again depicts Khabekhnet before a statue of Amenhotep I and Amun; a lower register depicts Khabekhnet and his wife being led by Anubis and Horus before Osiris and Isis.

The right side of the western wall has a double scene which is partly continued from the northern wall. In the first register, Khabekhnet appears before the Theban Triad of Amun, his consort Mut, and son Khonsu, and before Amenhotep I, Ahmose-Nefertari, and Meritamun. In the second register, Khabekhnet and Sahte, standing on the northern wall, worship Ra-Horakhty and Osiris, who are seated on the western wall. The lower registers depict offering scenes, and a seated Anubis.

Only the lintel and doorway of the inner room are decorated. The lintel depicts a double scene of Khabekhnet and his wife offering to the Theban Triad; the boat of the god Ra is above the lintel. The door jambs depict Khonsu and Tamaket on the left and Khabekhnet and Sahte on the right. Decoration is preserved only on the left side of the doorway thickness, which focuses on Khonsu and hymns to Ra.

== Tombs ==
Each of the chapels had their own set of burial chambers cut beneath them. The southern chapel's chambers were accessed through a shaft cut in the southeastern corner of the first room. The subterranean rooms are in a poor state of preservation as the ceilings have collapsed. Kathrin Gabler and Anne-Claire Salmas suggest that the rooms were intended for Khonsu but went unused, abandoned by him due to the unstable rock.

TT2B, the burial suite below the northern chapel, is accessed via a staircase that occupies the floor of the first room. The stairs descend 4 m (13 ft) and open to the west onto a plastered rectangular room measuring 4.30 m × 2 m (14.1 ft × 6.6 ft). The decorated burial chamber is accessed to the west via a short staircase. The room measures 5.40 m × 2.60 m (17.7 ft × 8.5 ft) with a vaulted ceiling 2.70 m (8.9 ft) high and is orientated north–south along its length. A doorway in the centre of the long western wall of the burial chamber leads to two further parallel rooms, both of which have vaulted ceilings but are not plastered or decorated. The later, neighbouring tomb TT299, one of the two tombs of Inherkhau, collided with the southwest corners of these undecorated rooms.

=== Contents ===
In Bruyère's 1927 clearance, he found only fragments of the original burial equipment, including a wooden pectoral, a fragmentary ushabti for Sahte, ushabti box lids inscribed for Khabekhnet, legs from a lion-shaped funerary bed, and jars containing meat and mummification refuse. Intrusive finds consisted of over 100 ushabti washed in from the adjoining TT299, and Late Period footwear sized for adults and children.

=== Decoration ===
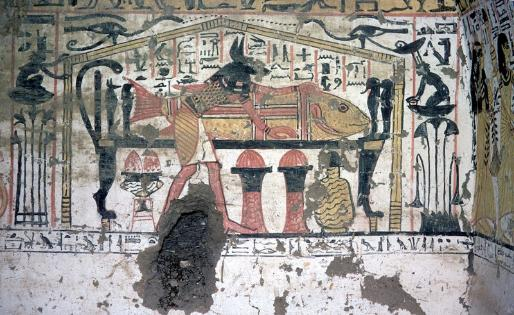
Khabekhnet's mummy as an abdw-fish attended by Anubis, south wall of the burial chamber

Only the burial chamber of TT2B is decorated. It is painted in the monochrome style, with yellow figures outlined in black or red on a white background. The scenes are relatively small in scale, leaving the lower 1 metre (3 ft 3 in) of the walls white.

The eastern wall has six small scenes. At the southern end, to the left of the entrance door, Khabekhnet and Sahti offer an eye of Horus to Thoth as a baboon. Above the doorway, the Nile god Hapi is depicted holding a tray of offerings and vases from which water pours. To the right of the door are three scenes. In the first, the goddesses Serket and Neith offer water to Horus of Behdet as a falcon wearing the double crown. In the second, Khabekhnet and Sahti advance towards Ptah and Maat, seated inside a shrine. In the third, at the northern end of the wall, the couple offer braziers to Anubis and Hathor as Mistress of the West.

The short northern wall depicts the mummy of Khabekhnet on a bier, attended by Anubis and flanked at head and foot by Isis, Nephthys, and tree goddesses holding stelae. Above, separated by a band of text, is Nephthys with outstretched wings.

On the western wall, Khonsu and his wife Tamaket appear in the first (northern-most) scene, presenting incense to Ra, Osiris, and Amenhotep I. Next, Khabekhnet, dressed in a priestly leopard-skin, burns incense and pours libations before Amenhotep I (represented twice) and his deified mother, Ahmose-Nefertari. In the following scene, Khabekhnet adores Ptah-Sokar and a goddess, possibly Tefnut; Sahti stands behind her husband, presenting an offering of onions. The lintel of the door, leading to the further undecorated rooms, is damaged but preserves the names of Amenhotep I, Ahmose-Nefertari, Meritamen, Mentuhotep II, and the snake goddess Wadjet. The fifth and final scene on this wall shows Sennedjem and Iyneferti giving offerings and libations to a form of the god Ptah, Ptah-neb-Maat, and the Theban cobra goddess Meretseger.

On the short southern wall are two scenes side-by-side. On the right is the mummy of Khabekhnet as a fish, attended by Anubis, Isis, Nephthys and the four sons of Horus; on the left is the solar god Khepri (depicted with a falcon head) and Osiris with the emblem of the fish nome (region). Above, the goddess Isis spreads her wings.

The vaulted ceiling is divided into eastern and western halves by a central inscription. Each side is further divided into four scenes by columns of text. The eastern half depicts, from right to left: Khabekhnet and Sahti adoring a stairway, atop which is the falcon-headed funerary god Ptah-Sokar seated in a barque; Anubis leading Khabekhnet to his pyramid-chapel with his winged ba-soul hovering over the chapel's door; the sky goddess Mehet-Weret as a cow facing Khabekhnet's shadow across a pond; Sahti adoring Anubis. The western half depicts, from right to left: Khabekhnet adoring the ibis-headed god Thoth; Khabekhnet adoring the gods Hu and Ka seated on the back of a calf; the horizon with sun disc (containing a scarab beetle) is held on each side by the arms of the goddess Nut and supported below by a djed-pillar with arms, which in turn adores the goddess Tefnut as a lioness; the final scene is the god Osiris standing in a boat, flanked by Isis and Nephthys as birds.

== See also ==
- List of Theban tombs
