= TT1 =

Ancient Egyptian tomb

Theban tomb TT1
- Burial site of Sennedjem and family
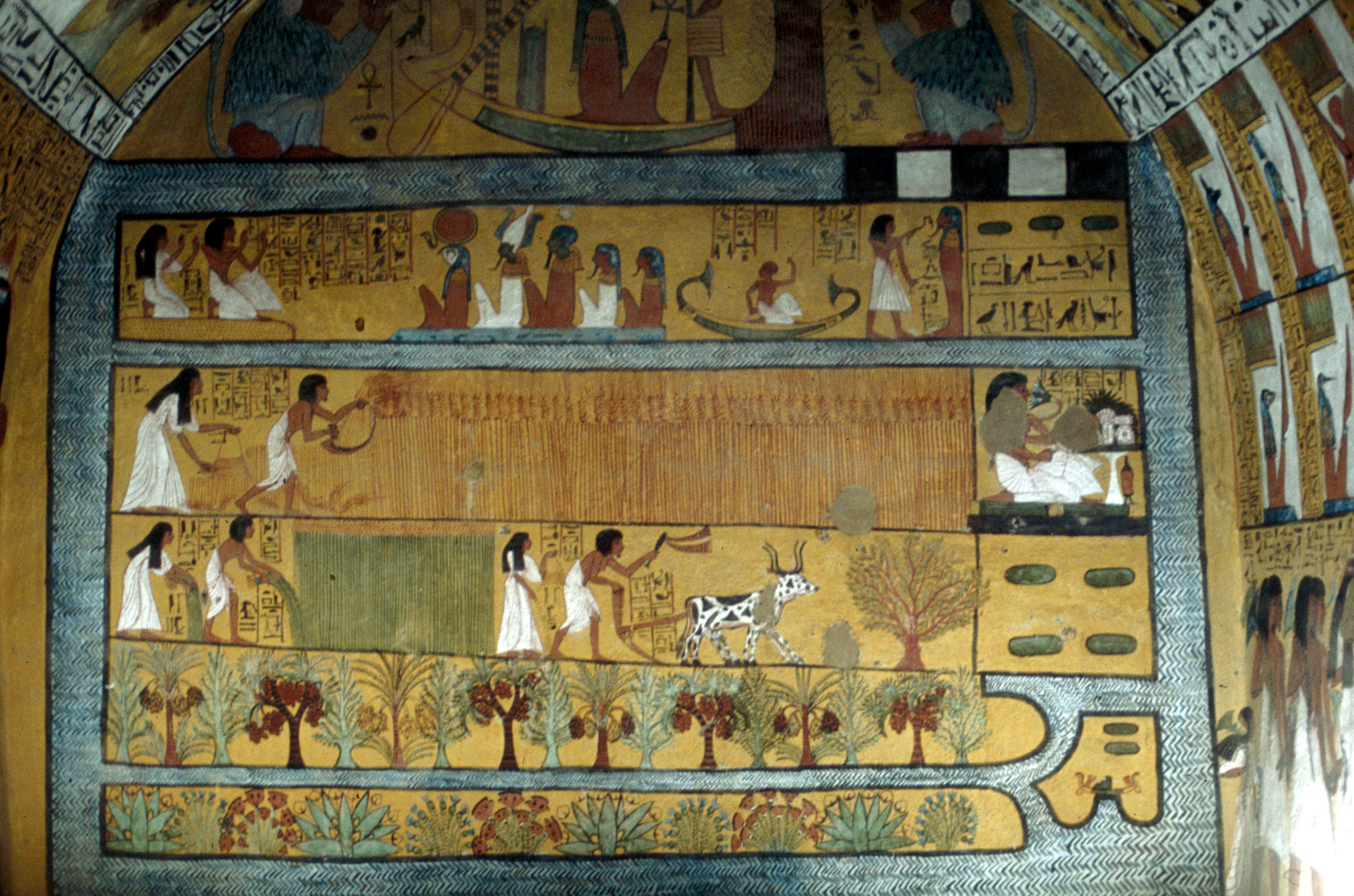
- Sennedjem and Iyneferti shown harvesting crops in the afterlife, east wall of the burial chamber

- Location within Egypt
- Coordinates: 25.7333°N 32.6000°E
- Location: Deir el-Medina, Theban Necropolis
- Discovered: January 1886
- Excavated by: Eduardo Toda y Güell (1886); Jacques Lecomte du Nouÿ (1917); Bernard Bruyère (1924-30)
- Decoration: Book of the Dead
- Next → TT2

TT1 is the burial place of the ancient Egyptian official Sennedjem and members of his family in Deir el-Medina, on the west bank of the Nile opposite Luxor. The funerary complex consists of three pyramid-shaped chapels dedicated to, from south to north, Sennedjem's father or brother, Sennedjem himself, and Sennedjem's son Khonsu. Of the three shafts associated with the chapels, only the shaft in front of Sennedjem's chapel was unrobbed. It leads to a series of underground rooms, including the extensively decorated burial chamber.

The undisturbed tomb was discovered in January 1886 in excavations by Gurnawi local Salam Abu Duhi and three others. The single room contained 165 objects, including over 20 burials belonging to family members of Sennedjem. Nine members of Sennedjem's immediate family were placed in coffins while the rest were placed on the floor. Sennedjem and his son Khonsu had the most elaborate burials, both being provided with a sarcophagus or outer rectangular coffin in addition to mummiform coffins, mummy boards and masks; these larger coffins were found disassembled and placed against a wall. For the other 11 people buried there, their exact relation to Sennedjem is unclear due to the lack of inscriptions.

The tomb was cleared quickly by Eduardo Toda y Güell and Jan Herman Insinger on behalf of Gaston Maspero, the head of the Antiquities Service. The burial goods included many ushabti, canopic chests and pieces of furniture. The contents of the tomb were transferred to the Boulaq Museum in Cairo. From there, some of the objects, including the coffins and mummies of Iyneferti, Khonsu, and Tamaket, were sold to museum and private collections around the world to fund further excavation work in Egypt. The most important items outside Egypt went to the Metropolitan Museum of Art in New York and the Egyptian Museum of Berlin; the exact locations of other pieces are now largely unknown.

== Sennedjem and family ==
Sennedjem was an ancient Egyptian official during the reigns of the pharaohs Seti I and Ramesses II of the Nineteenth Dynasty in the early 13th century BC. He bore the title "servant in the Place of Truth" (sḏm ꜥš m s.t mꜣꜥ.t), which indicates he was part of the community of royal tomb builders at Deir el-Medina. He may have been a scribe, based on the presence of an ostracon of the Story of Sinuhe placed near his coffin. Sennedjem was involved in the cult of the goddess Hathor, bearing the title "servant of Hathor" (bꜣk n(y) Hw.t-Ḥr). His father was Khabekhnet, who was titled "servant of Amun in the southern City" (ꜥš n Imn n Ip.t-rsy.t). Tahenu (or Taha(y)nu) is thought to be his mother. Khabekhnet and Tahenu are depicted with an additional woman named Rusu whose relationship to the couple is not specified. She may have been a second wife of Khabekhnet or Khabekhnet's own mother. Sennedjem had three brothers: Tutuya (or Tutuia), Messu (or Mose), and an elder brother, Tjaro.

Sennedjem's wife was Iyneferti. She was titled "lady of the house" (nb.t-pr) and "singer of Hathor" (ḥs.t n(t) Hw.t-Ḥr). Little is known of her family but her mother may have been named Mutnofret. Sennedjem and Iyneferti had at least 10 children, many of whom are depicted in their tomb and also worked in the royal necropolis. Their eldest son Khabekhnet, named for his paternal grandfather, was the owner of the nearby tomb TT2. A younger son, Khonsu, had a pyramid chapel within the TT1 complex and was buried in his father's tomb. Sennedjem and one or two of his sons lived in a cluster of houses in the newly built southern part of Deir el-Medina, close to the family tomb.

== Chapels ==
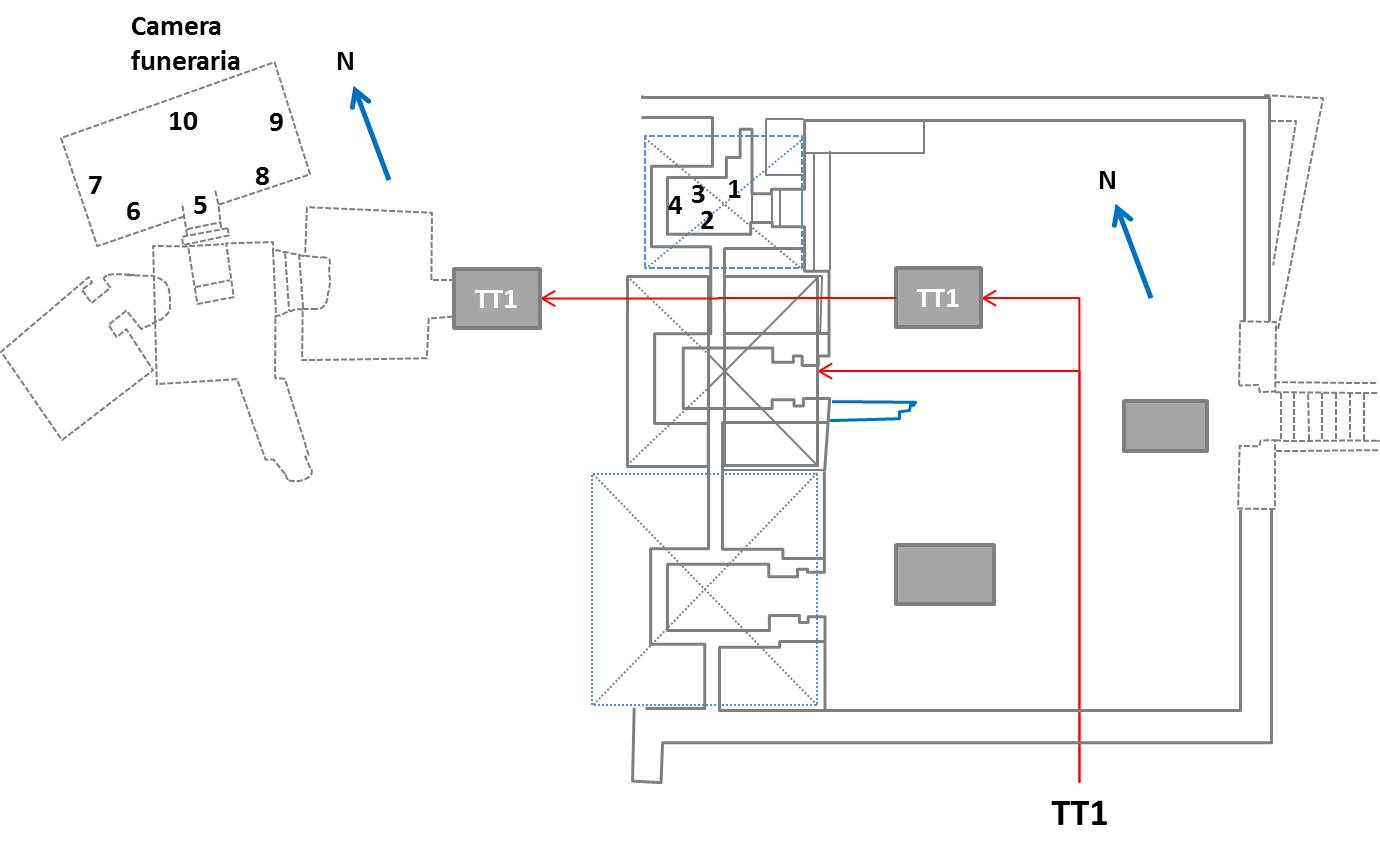
Plan of the chapels and main burial shaft of TT1

TT1 is located on a low terrace at the southern end of Deir el-Medina's western necropolis. The funerary complex contains three pyramid-shaped chapels within a walled courtyard. The court is rectangular and measures 12.35 m × 9.40 m (40.5 ft × 30.8 ft). While it was probably entered via stairs through a gateway shaped like a pylon, excavations by the Egyptologist Bernard Bruyère found no trace of them. A mudbrick bench was located against the north wall of the courtyard, likely to hold funerary offerings on festive occasions.

Sennedjem's chapel is the central of the three. It was constructed of a mix of mudbrick and stone, as was typical for the Nineteenth Dynasty. It has a projected restored height of 6.85 metres (22.5 ft) tall and width of 4.5 metres (15 ft) and was capped with a pyramidion of limestone, now fragmentary, depicting Sennedjem adoring the sun god Ra on his journey across the sky. The chapel was entered through a single doorway on the eastern side; the lintel (upper span of a doorway) depicts Sennedjem and Iyneferti worshipping the crocodile god Sobek. A stele was set into the face of the pyramid above the entrance depicting Sennedjem worshipping the rising sun. The chapel itself is a single barrel-vaulted room with a further funerary stele set into the rear wall. The entire interior was painted with colourful scenes but little trace remains.

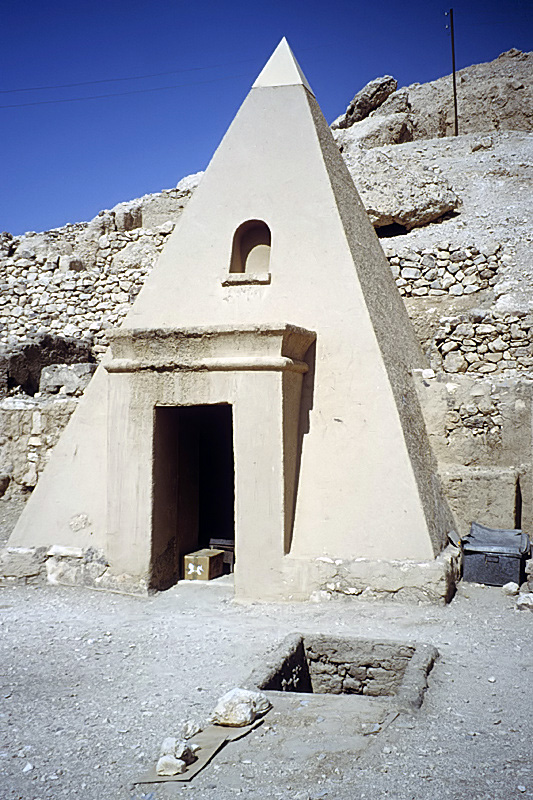
Restored and reconstructed pyramid chapel of Sennedjem with shaft entrance in the foreground

Sennedjem's chapel is flanked on the north side by the smaller pyramid-chapel of Khonsu. Due to lack of space, its walls are initially vertical before sloping to become a pyramid. The pyramidion of Khonsu's chapel depicts Khonsu, his wife Tamaket and their son Nekhenmut; it is now in the Museo Egizio in Turin, Italy. This is the only one of the three chapels to preserve painted decoration. The decoration on the interior of the door frame depicts Khonsu's brother Khabekhnet and his second wife Isis. Another preserved piece of decoration depicts two fragmentary underworld deities. The scene was likely similar to that seen in the burial chamber of TT1, where the deceased couple appear in adoration of a series of gods. The south wall featured the funeral procession. The lower register shows the funerary sledge pulled by men and two oxen and accompanied by women. The scene continued onto the rear (west) wall, where the mummy, supported by a kneeling man, stands before a pyramid chapel; priests administer funerary rites. A band of hieroglyphic text, preserved only in small sections, gave Khonsu's name and title, and served to divide the wall decoration from the ceiling all around the chapel.

A wall divided the chapels of Sennedjem and Khonsu from the larger southernmost pyramid chapel. It is the oldest of the three, being constructed entirely of mudbrick and therefore dating its construction to the Eighteenth Dynasty. The southern pyramid chapel is assigned to Tjaro, thought to be Sennedjem's elder brother or Khabekhnet, Sennedjem's father. The southern chapel was never used as the burial shaft is unfinished. The Egyptologists Kathrin Gabler and Anne-Claire Salmas suggest that this is intended, as Khabekhnet did not live in Deir el-Medina and worked outside of the necropolis; his title "servant of Amun in the Southern City" indicates he worked in the temple complexes on the east bank. They suggest that the chapel was non-functional, given its separation from the others by a wall and its apparent lack of decoration, and was instead a physical representation of the familial line of descent.

Three burial shafts were dug in the courtyard in front of the chapels. The central shaft, numbered P1182, is located at the very front of the enclosure and is 6.1 metres (20 ft) long and contains two adjoining subterranean rooms. Based on finds of fragments of statuary and pottery with inscribed names, this seems to have been the burial place of Sennedjem's older brother Tjaro and Sennedjem's son Bunakhtef. The other shaft, numbered P1183, in front of the southern chapel is unfinished and unused. The northernmost shaft located 1.70 metres (5.6 ft) from Sennedjem's chapel led to his burial chamber.

== Tomb ==
=== Discovery and clearance ===
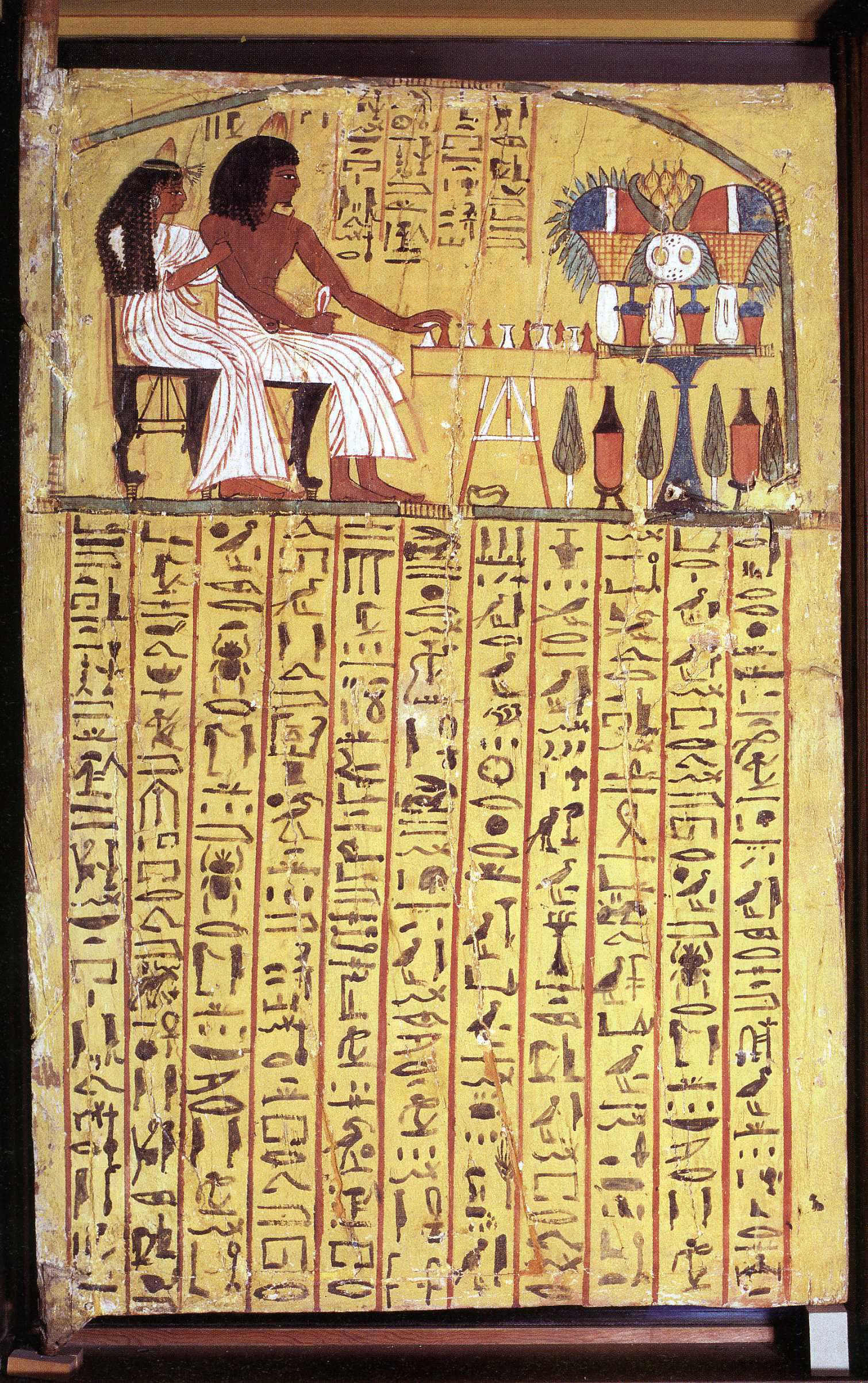
Interior of the burial chamber's door, depicting Sennedjem and Iyneferti playing senet

The intact burial chamber of TT1 was discovered in January 1886 by Gurnawi local Salam Abu Duhi and three others. They had obtained permission from Gaston Maspero, the director of the Antiquities Service, to look for tombs in Deir el-Medina. After seven days of excavation, they found an intact burial shaft that led to a series of underground rooms. The tomb descended further, via a concealed shaft, to a painted doorway closed with a decorated door; the door was sealed with a moulded clay seal in the shape of the head of the god Anubis. On 31 January, Maspero was informed of the find and visited with Urbain Bouriant, Eduardo Toda y Güell and Jan Herman Insinger on 1 February. They made copies of the decorated doorframe before dismantling it to preserve the door and entered the room. Toda described the space as "covered with bodies and masses of ceramics, bread, fruit, furniture and bouquets at the corners". The painted burial chamber contained the burials of at least 20 people and were accompanied by a wide variety of objects. Both coffined and uncoffined mummies were placed against the west wall of the chamber, while the disassembled funerary sarcophagi (or shrines) were placed against the east wall; funerary equipment such as canopic chests, and ushabti were mixed with work tools, boxes, vases, furniture, food, and bouquets.

Eduardo Toda y Güell became responsible for the clearance of the tomb and Jan Herman Insinger for photography. The tomb was cleared in three days by Toda and seven workers. No plan was made to record the positions of objects and few photographs were taken during the clearance. Having bought the discoverers out of their half of the find, the entire contents of the burial chamber, some 165 objects by Toda's count, were loaded onto the Antiquities Service's dahabeah Boulaq for transport to the Boulaq Museum in Cairo. A stool was broken and the uncoffined mummies were damaged during transport to the boat, prompting Toda to only keep their heads. Once in Cairo, a sample of representative or unique items were kept for the museum while the rest was sold.

After the clearance of the tomb in 1886, the Antiquities Service closed the base of the shaft with a metal mesh door. In 1917, Jacques Lecomte du Nouÿ cleared the two other shafts in the courtyard. The complex as a whole was excavated by Bernard Bruyère between 1924 and 1930. He partially cleared the courtyard in 1924-25 and re-excavated the associated shafts in 1928. A full report of his work was published in 1959.

=== Architecture ===
The subterranean parts of TT1 are accessed via a 6 metres (20 ft) deep vertical shaft cut into the courtyard in front of Sennedjem's chapel. Niches are cut into the walls of the shaft to allow access without a ladder. The shaft opens to the west onto an undecorated room measuring 3 m × 3.80 m (9.8 ft × 12.5 ft). Anciently, a (wooden) door closed the shaft from the rest of the sepulchre; the limestone lintel and doorjambs named Sennedjem, Iyneferti, Khabekhnet, and Khonsu. This room is divided in half by a modern brick wall built in 1890 for a barred door to secure the tomb. Continuing west, four descending steps access a further chamber measuring 3.50 metres (11.5 ft) long and wide, with a vaulted ceiling 2.50 metres (8.2 ft) high. Based on pottery found in this vaulted room, it probably functioned as a storeroom for funerary offerings. Three further rooms are accessed via passages cut into the floor near the walls. The shaft against the south wall leads to another smaller storeroom approximately 2 metres (6.6 ft) long; it contained plain ceramics. A short shaft against the western wall leads to another undecorated room that measures 2.40 m × 2.90 m (7.9 ft × 9.5 ft) with a flat ceiling 1.40 metres (4.6 ft) tall. It is roughly cut and unfinished; it was probably intended to be a burial chamber, either the original burial chamber or one cut later when the existing chamber became full.

The burial chamber used by Sennedjem and his family is accessed via a 2 metres (6.6 ft) deep shaft near the north wall; niches are cut into the sides as with the main shaft. It was closed with a stone slab at the time of discovery. At the base of the shaft was a wooden door set into an inscribed limestone door frame. Beyond this was the burial chamber, a rectangular room measuring 5.12 m × 2.61 m (16.8 by 8.6 feet) with a vaulted ceiling 2.40 metres (7.9 ft) tall. It is lined with mudbricks and coated with plaster to provide a smooth background for decoration.

=== Decoration ===
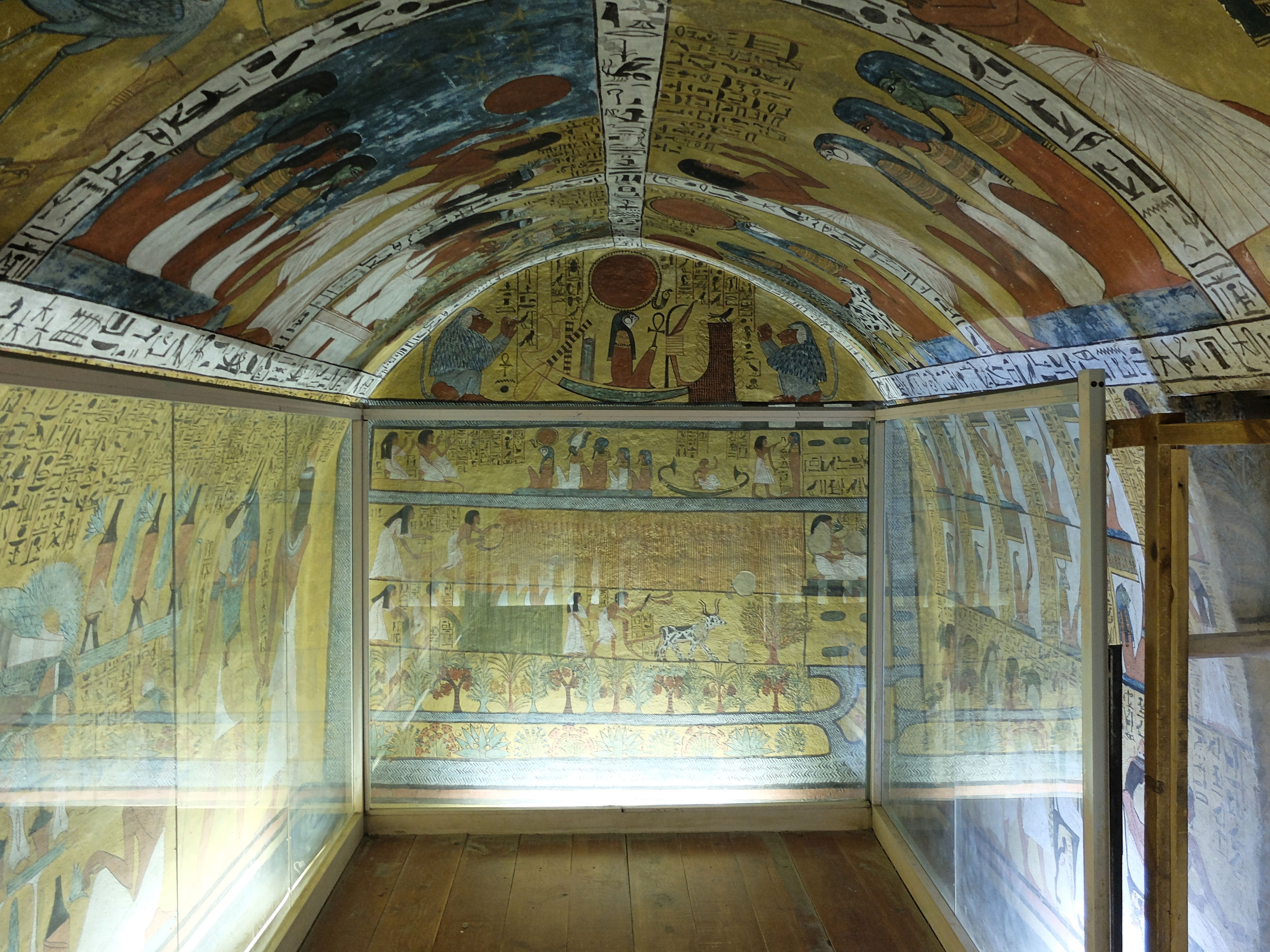
The burial chamber (view towards the east wall)

The walls and ceiling of the burial chamber, an area of 40 square metres (430 sq ft), are entirely covered with paintings. They are well preserved and are considered by writer Alberto Siliotti to be "among the most beautiful of the necropolis and, at all events, the best known". As is typical of Deir el-Medina, the majority of the scenes have religious and mythological themes, in this case vignettes from the Book of the Dead. The floor of the chamber is painted red. The decoration is executed on a yellow background, suggested by Hany Farid and Samir Farid to recall the papyrus used for funerary texts; The Egyptologist Kathlyn M. Cooney sees it as giving the burial chamber solar connotations, directly inspired by the "golden room" seen in royal tombs. The layout of the decoration reflects the journey of the deceased through the Underworld and their rebirth into the Afterlife, with the decoration and texts flowing from west to east on each wall, ending with the depiction of Sennedjem and Iyneferti in Aaru, the afterlife. Egyptologist Rogerio Sousa takes this death-to-rebirth interpretation further, interpreting the decoration as flowing from the left side of the doorway, along the two long walls, then the two short walls, then the ceiling and back to the right side of the doorway, covering the death, underworld journey and eventual rebirth of the deceased following the solar cycle.

The painting of the burial chamber was likely completed before the fifth year of Ramesses II's reign. The hieroglyphic inscriptions are uniformly written, indicating the work was done by a single artist. However, the Egyptologist Gema Menéndez suggests the decoration was done by two artists with very similar styles, presumably a master who did the bulk of the work, and an apprentice who painted parts of the ceiling. Menéndez suggests the artist responsible is Pashed, the chief draughtsman active during the reigns of Seti I and Ramesses II who worked on the tomb of Seti I in the Valley of the Kings and in tombs in the Valley of the Queens.

==== Door and doorway ====
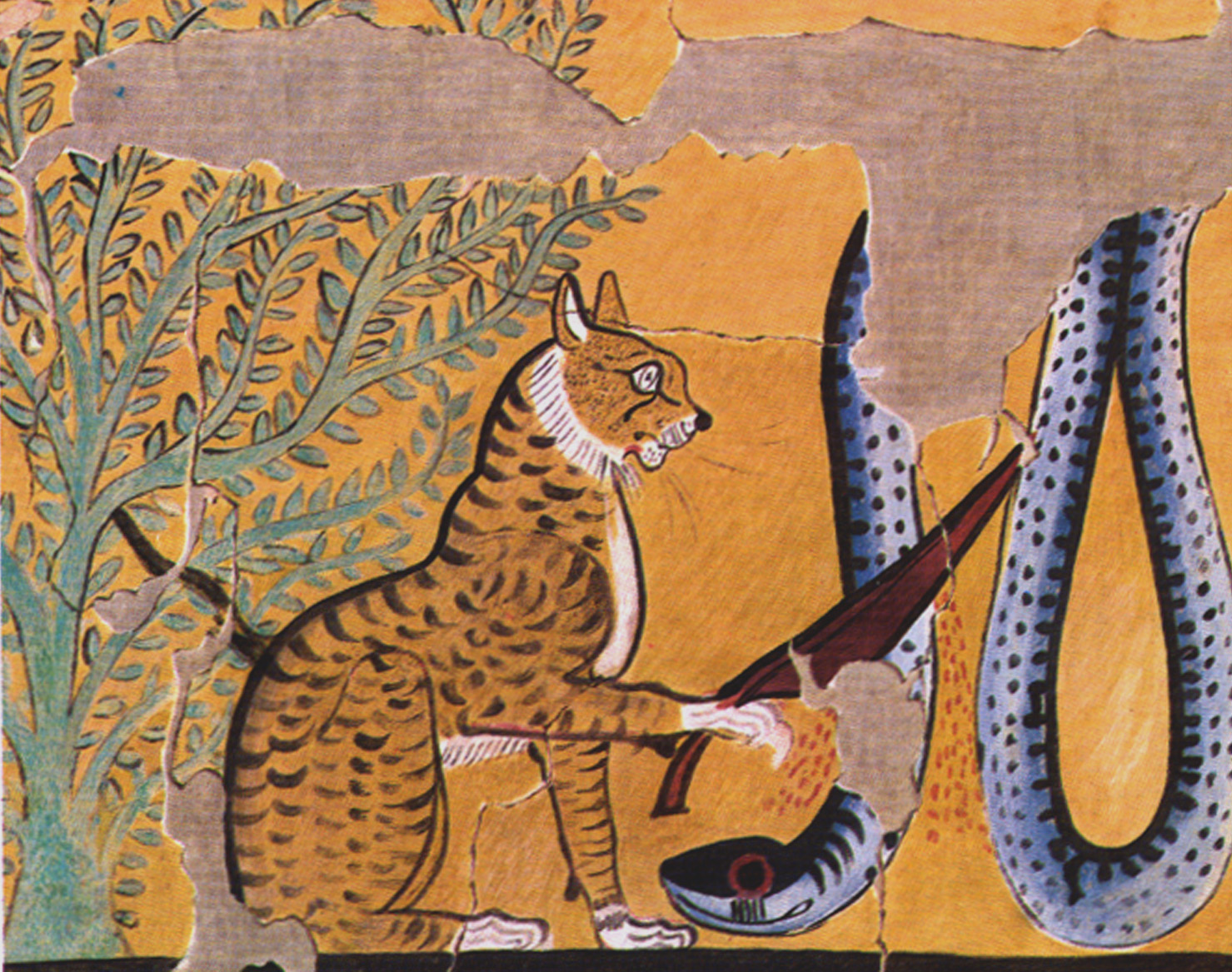
Ra in the form of a cat killing Apep, facsimile by Charles K. Wilkinson, Metropolitan Museum of Art

The tomb's decoration starts outside the burial chamber, with a painted doorway. The lintel depicts Sennedjem worshiping the god Atum who is seated in a barque (boat). The vertical doorjambs are inscribed with columns of text. The burial chamber was closed with a painted wooden door that is decorated on both sides. The exterior depicts Sennedjem, Iyneferti, and their daughter Irunefer before Osiris and Maat. Below, seven of the couple's sons worship the deities Ptah-Sokar-Osiris and Isis. The interior surface of the door depicts Sennedjem and Iyneferti playing the board game senet. The left side of the doorway depicts the two lions of the horizon (Aker); on the right side Ra, depicted as "The Great Cat", decapitates the snake Apep, representing victory over night. The ceiling of the doorway depicts the arms of the goddess Nut holding the sun.

==== West wall ====
The tympanum (semicircular register) on the west wall depicts two Anubis-jackals laying on rectangular tomb-shrines. Below them, Sennedjem and Iyneferti adore thirteen seated funerary gods, including Osiris and Ra-Harakhty. The text separating the deities appeals to funerary gods to grant the deceased strength and power.

==== South wall ====
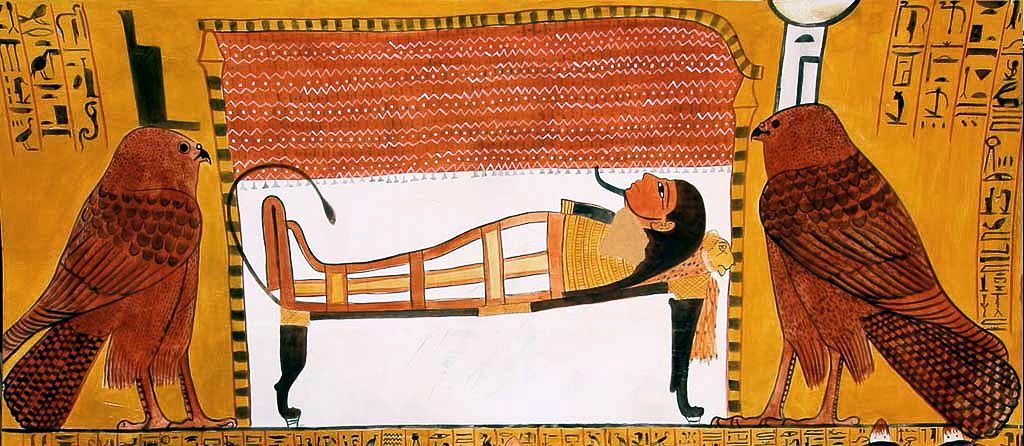
Isis and Nephthys as kites flanking the mummy of Sennedjem, south wall of the burial chamber

The lowest register of the south wall depicts a family banquet, separated into left (east) and right (west) sides by the doorway. Seated on the left, the side of the living, are Sennedjem's probable brothers Tutuya and Messu. Messu's daughter Taia stands with him. Behind them, Sennedjem's eldest son Khabekhnet and his wife Sahti are depicted seated with their daughter Henutweret. Behind them stand the rest of Sennedjem's children led by sons Bunakhtef and Rahotep: the eldest daughter Iutnefret, then the sons Khonsu, Ramose, Anihotep and Ranekhu who stand in pairs and finally a young unnamed girl. On the right side, the side of the dead, Sennedjem and Iyneferti are seated at the far right and attended to by their son Bunakhtef, who is dressed as a sem-priest (priest who conducted funerary rites) and pours a libation; their two young children, Ranekhu and Hotepu, stand under their chairs. Next to them are Tjaro and Taya, whose son Roma pours a libation and offers them "breath" in the form of a sail; a daughter named Taashen sits under Taya's chair. Closest to the doorway is Sennedjem's father Khabekhnet, his mother Tahenu and possible grandmother Rusu who are also attended by a son named Roma; an additional daughter is seated beneath a chair. A further register is above this scene. On the left side, Sennedjem and Iyneferti adore 10 Underworld gate guardians in two separate registers. On the right side is a depiction of Sennedjem's mummy on a lion-shaped funerary bed inside a tent, and flanked on either side by the goddesses Isis and Nephthys in the form of birds.

==== North wall ====
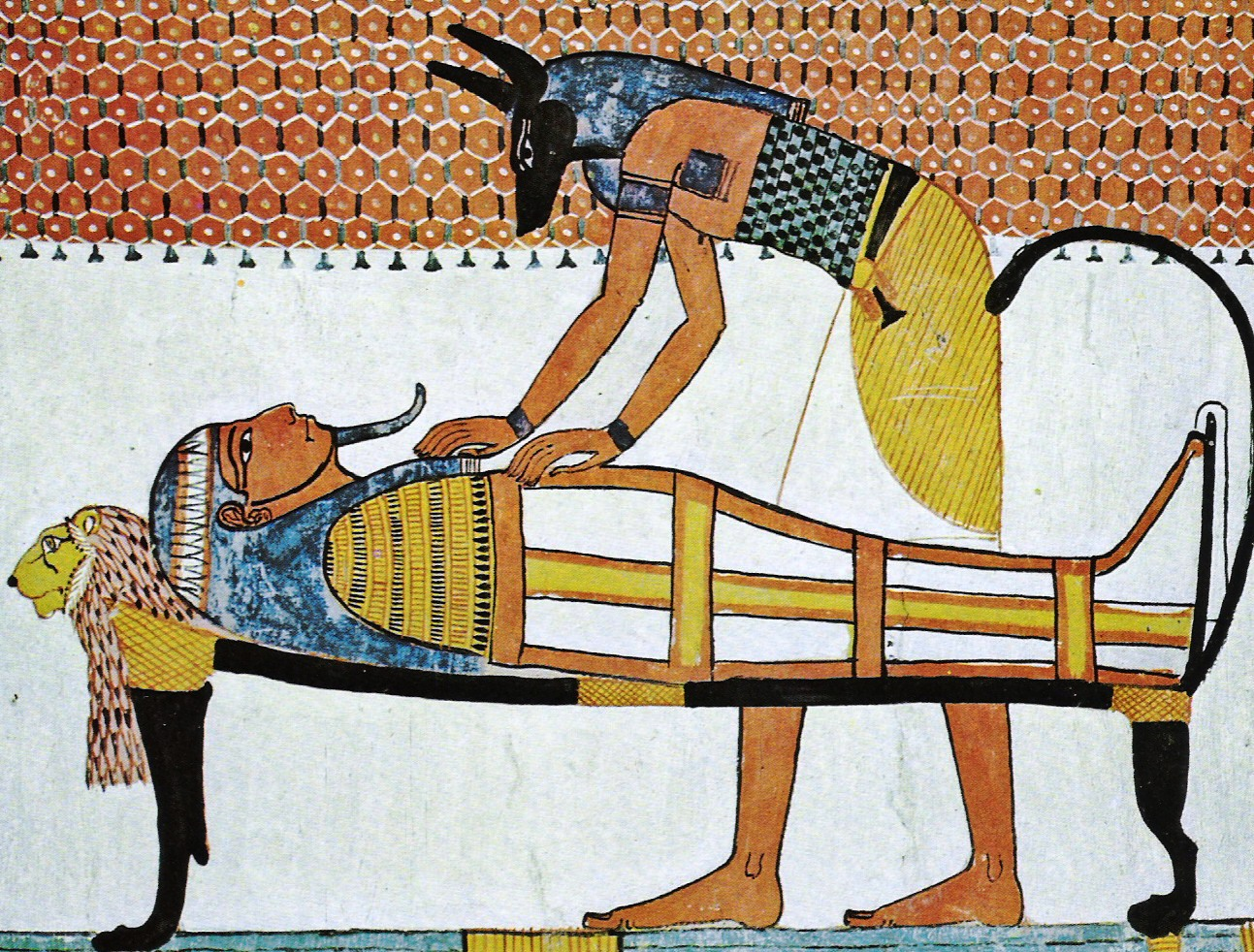
Anubis tending to the mummy of Sennedjem, north wall of the burial chamber

The north wall is divided into two scenes. On the left, Anubis attends the mummy of Sennedjem in a tent, surrounded by text from the Book of the Dead. On the right, in a scene referencing the weighing of the heart, Sennedjem is escorted by Anubis into the presence of Osiris, who stands in a booth flanked by eyes of Horus and imiut fetishes. Sennedjem is depicted again kneeling before an offering table in front of Osiris. He wears a grey wig, possibly to indicate he has lived a long life and died in old age.

==== East wall ====
The tympanum of the short east wall depicts the rising sun as a seated sun god on a solar barque, adored by baboons. The second register depicts several scenes. From left to right, Sennedjem and his wife adore Ra, Osiris, and Ptah, and two additional gods. Their son Rahotep sails a papyrus skiff, and his brother Khonsu performs the "Opening of the Mouth" ritual for his father's mummy. Below is a large scene of Aaru, the ancient Egyptian afterlife. Sennedjem and Iyneferti plough the soil, and plant and harvest crops, surrounded by a familiar Nile environment of palm trees and sycamores, flowers such as cornflowers and poppies, and irrigation canals. On the right side, Sennedjem receives food offerings. The barque of Ra-Harakhty is docked at an island on the bottom right.

==== Ceiling ====
The ceiling is divided in half lengthwise and separated into four scenes on each side. The westernmost scene of the southern side depicts dawn, with the sun rising between turquoise trees and the star Sirius carried by a bull calf representing the young sun and accompanied by Ra-Horakhty-Atum. The next two scenes show Sennedjem adoring two groups of underworld gods, identified in their respective captions as gods of truth, and gods of the Duat (Underworld). The final scene is Sennedjem before a group of three gods headed by Thoth. The northern side depicts from west to east Sennedjem's journey to the afterlife. In the first scene he opens the "Secret Door of the Duat". The second scene is the nighttime journey of the sun, whose soul as the Bennu-bird sails in a boat accompanied by Ra-Harakhty-Atum. In the third scene, Sennedjem and Iyneferti worship five kneeling underworld gods. The fourth scene depicts the goddess Nut as a sycamore tree offering food and drink to Sennedjem and Iyneferti who kneel in adoration of her. The layout of the scenes on the ceiling is similar to that seen on coffins, with transverse and vertical bands of text addressing funerary gods in the same order.

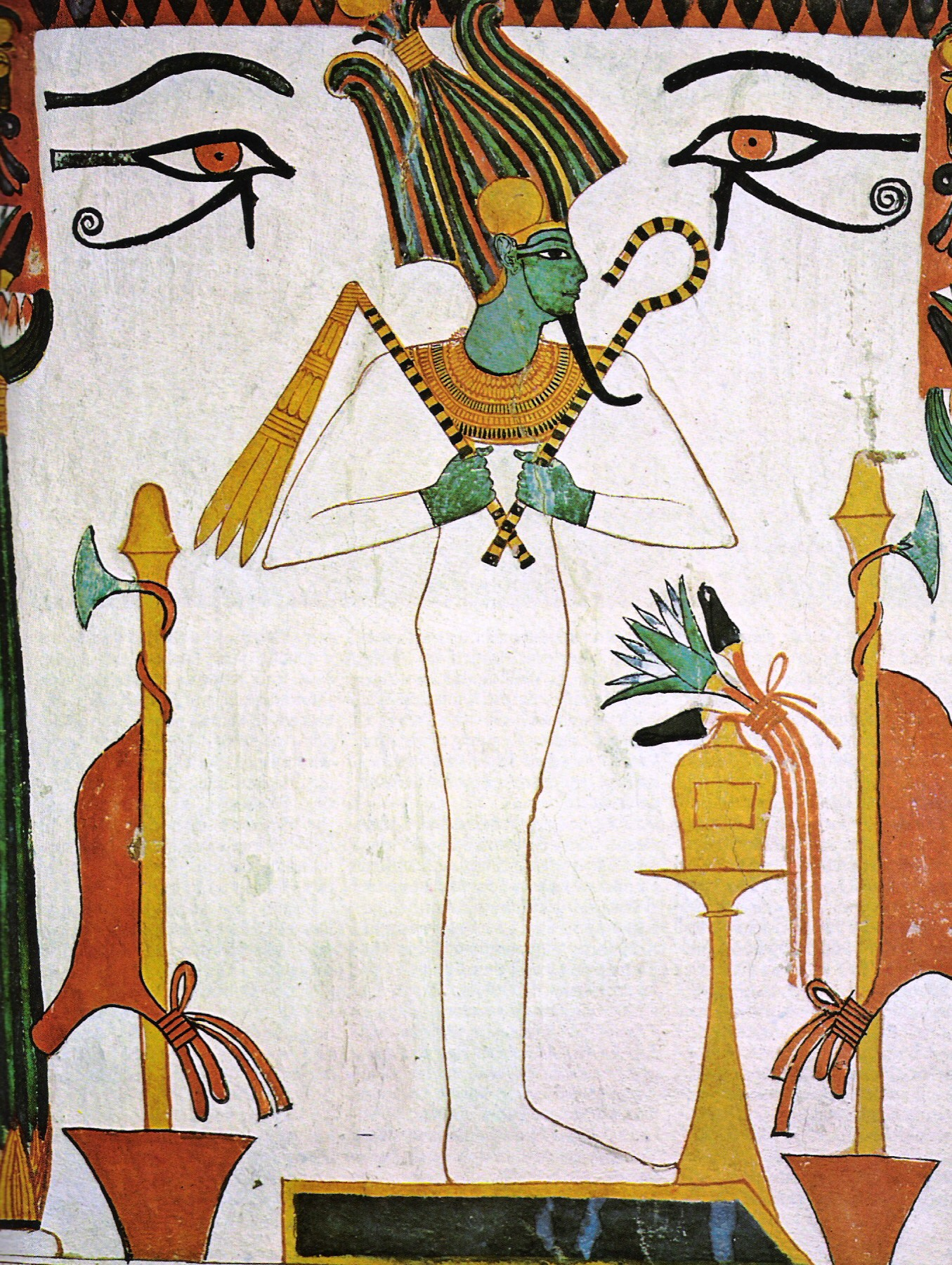
Osiris within a kiosk flanked by two imiut fetishes (animal skin emblem), north wall of the burial chamber

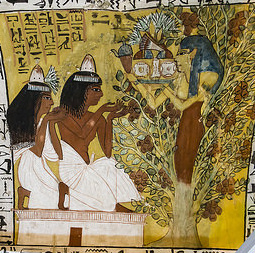
Sennedjem and Iyneferti receive offerings from the goddess Nut, ceiling of the burial chamber

=== Contents ===
TT1 is one of few New Kingdom tombs discovered intact in modern times. However, Cooney suggests the tomb does not represent an intact Nineteenth Dynasty burial but instead a tomb which family may have reentered as late as the Twentieth Dynasty to remove recyclable items. The exact positions of the objects within the burial chamber at the time of discovery is unknown.

The largest pieces of furniture in the tomb were funerary in nature. These are Sennedjem's funerary bed and his funerary chair dedicated by his son Khabekhnet, and an uninscribed offering table. Eight stools were placed in the tomb. Five are everyday examples used by the occupants in life and three are considered to be funerary; two are inscribed for Iyneferti and one for Mose. All forty boxes and chests in the tomb were found empty; the contents were likely removed by later family members. The only jewellery found in the tomb comes from the bodies of Sennedjem, Iyneferti and Khonsu; the nine boxes thought to have held jewellery were likely emptied by family members in antiquity. Remaining personal possessions included Sennedjem's work tools, among which were a right-angle level and a cubit rod, and nine inscribed walking sticks. Funerary provisions included bread, fruit, and painted vases of wine. A date palm trunk was carved with the head of Hathor flanked by goddesses Nekhbet and Wadjet as crowned cobras, and inscribed with Sennedjem's name and title. According to Bruyère, it was used as a lever to move objects into the tomb.

One of the largest known ostraca (stone or broken pottery used for writing on) was placed near the coffin set of Sennedjem. It is inscribed with the start of the Story of Sinuhe in hieratic text. The upper surface was polished and it was shaped to mimic a wooden writing tablet, although at 106 by 22 centimetres (41.7 in × 8.7 in) it is larger than its wooden counterparts. It was placed in the tomb as a burial gift; possibly the text was a favourite of Sennedjem.

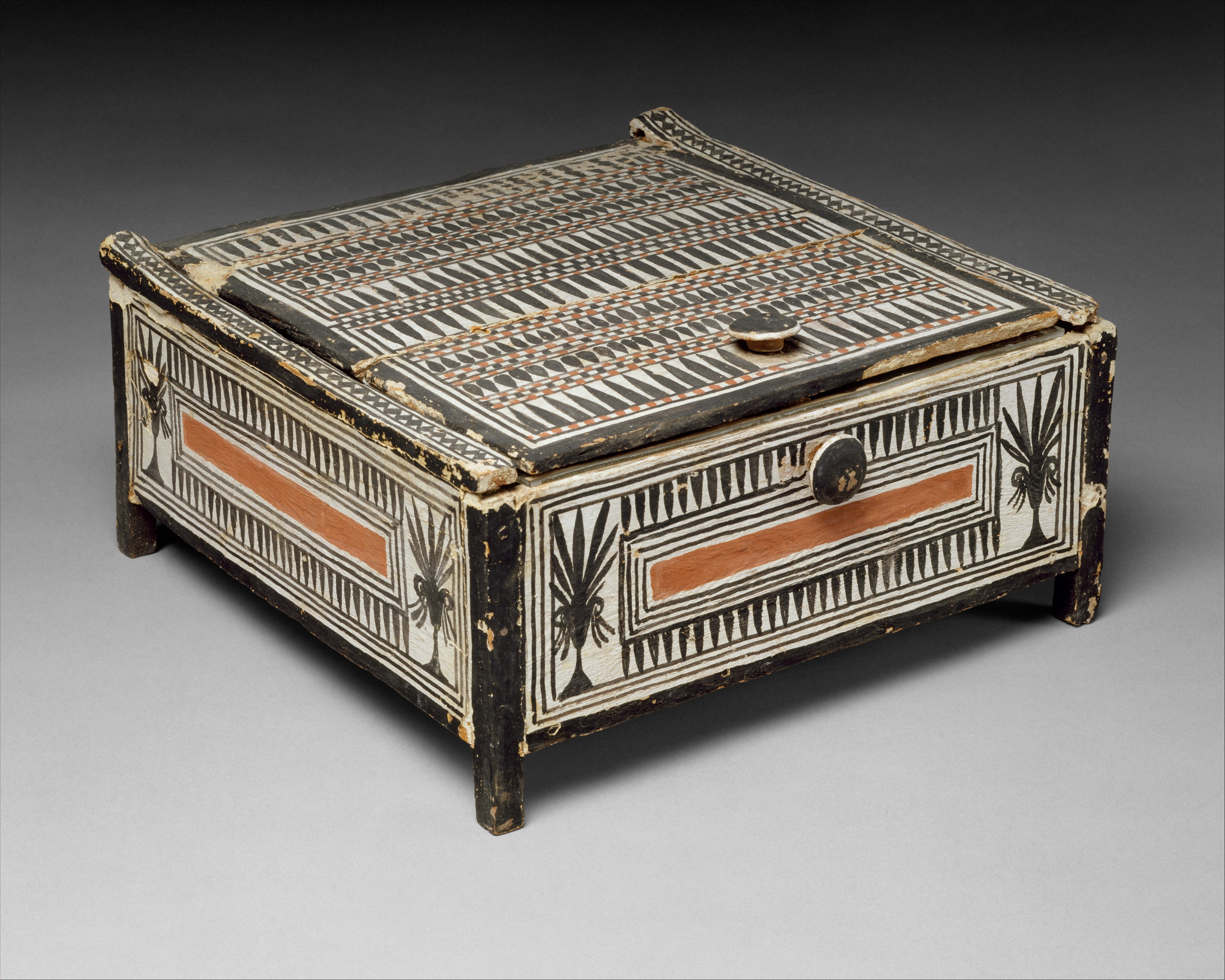
Painted cosmetic box, Metropolitan Museum of Art

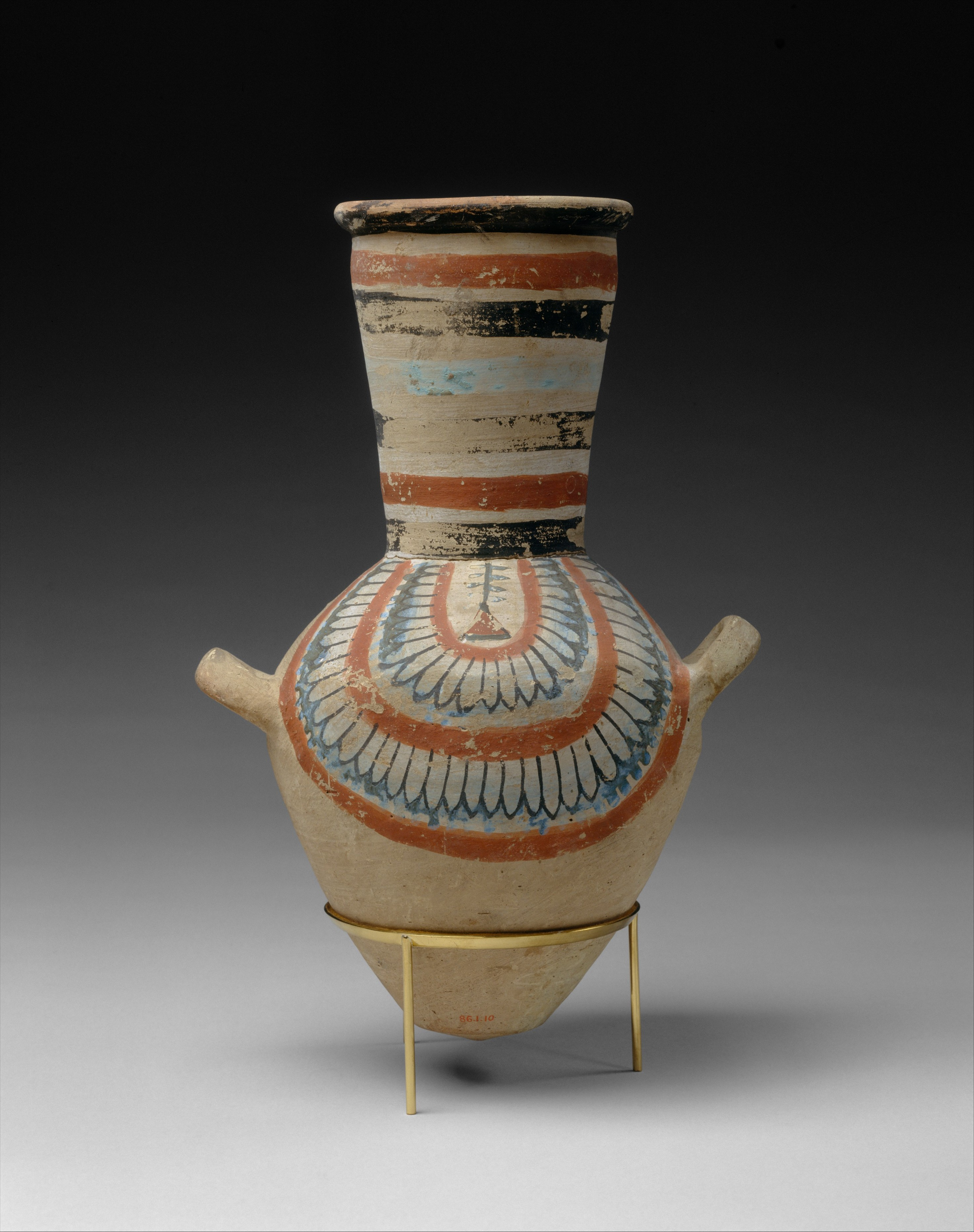
Painted jar, Metropolitan Museum of Art

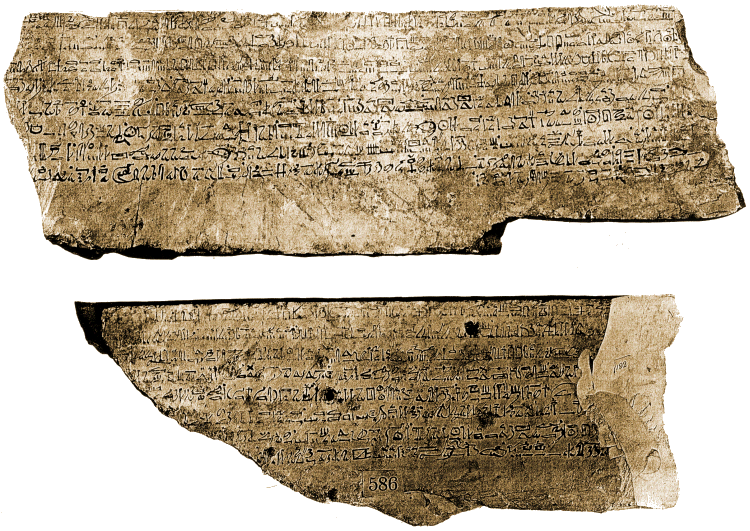
Large ostracon of the Story of Sinuhe, found broken into two pieces

== Burials ==
The tomb contained the burials of at least 20 people. According to Maspero, the burials in coffins were stacked atop each other at the western end of the chamber, with the exception of Khonsu who was placed on a bed, and the bodies without coffins were placed on the floor. The pieces of the disassembled sarcophagi were placed at the other end of the room, against the western end of the south wall. Those interred in the tomb included Sennedjem, his wife Iyneferti, and some of their children including Khonsu and his wife Tamaket, Parahotep, Taashen, Ramose, and Hathor, and grandchildren such as Isis, daughter of Khonsu. Two foetuses or infants were buried in yellow-painted wooden boxes. Nine burials were in coffins (eight adults, one child), and 11 individuals were buried without coffins. The bodies of the child and the two foetuses were given floral garlands composed of folded persea leaves and date palm.

=== Coffins and mummies ===
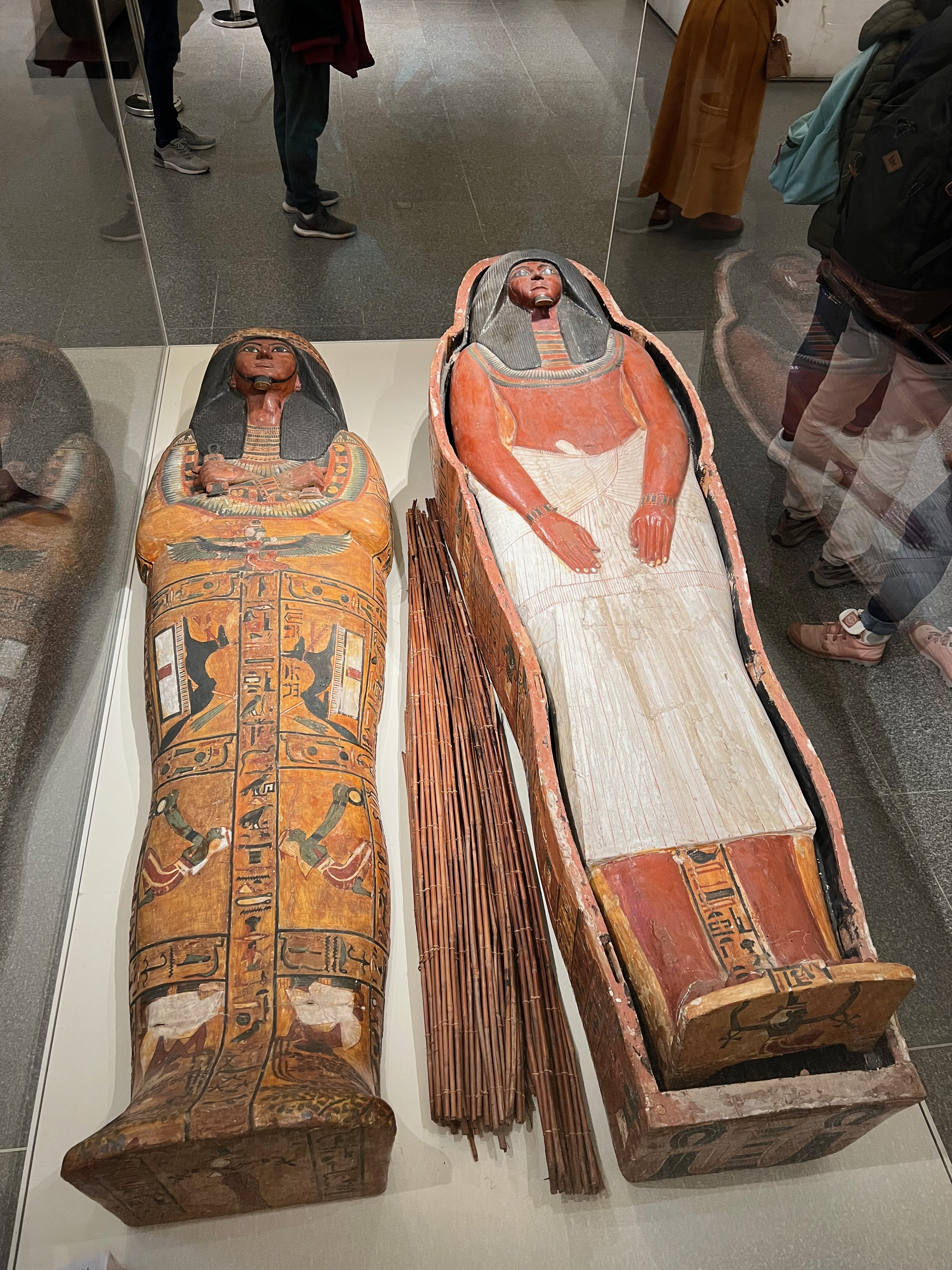
Coffin and mummy board of Sennedjem displayed in the National Museum of Egyptian Civilization

The most elaborate and best studied coffin sets are those of Sennedjem, Iyneferti, Khonsu and Isis. Sennedjem was buried in a wooden rectangular sarcophagus or outer coffin shaped like a shrine. This was mounted on sledge runners and fitted with four working wheels; the wheels and axles were not found in the tomb but the wheels are inferred to have been of solid wood 30 centimetres (12 in) in diameter based on the areas of lost paint on the runners. The background is entirely yellow, possibly in imitation of gold. The protective goddesses Serket and Neith, and Isis and Nephthys are depicted at the head and foot ends respectively. The sides have two registers of decoration, the lower of which depicts the usual funerary complement of the four sons of Horus, Anubis, and Thoth. Scenes in the upper register and lid are based on scenes from the Book of the Dead. Sennedjem's coffined body was originally placed on a funerary bed decorated with snakes within the sarcophagus. However, at the time of discovery this sarcophagus had been disassembled to allow more space for further interments; the coffins of Khonsu were placed on the bed instead.

Sennedjem had a single mummy-shaped coffin and a mummy board. The coffin decoration is typical of the time period but entirely yellow with coloured scenes instead of black-based with gilded bands and figures. The lid depicts him as a wrapped mummy wearing a naturalistic wig and the short beard of the living. His mummy board, placed inside the coffin atop the body, depicts him as a young man in a wig, broad collar, and white linen kilt. More specifically Sennedjem is represented as an akh, an effective spirit that has passed the trials of the afterlife. His mummy was also equipped with a cartonnage mummy mask. Sousa suggests, through comparison with his coffin, that the mask of Khonsu in the Metropolitan Museum really belongs to Sennedjem but was swapped at some point before its sale. His body was equipped with three pectorals, one of which is a heart scarab. His mummy has not been X-rayed or CT scanned so nothing is known about his health or age at death.

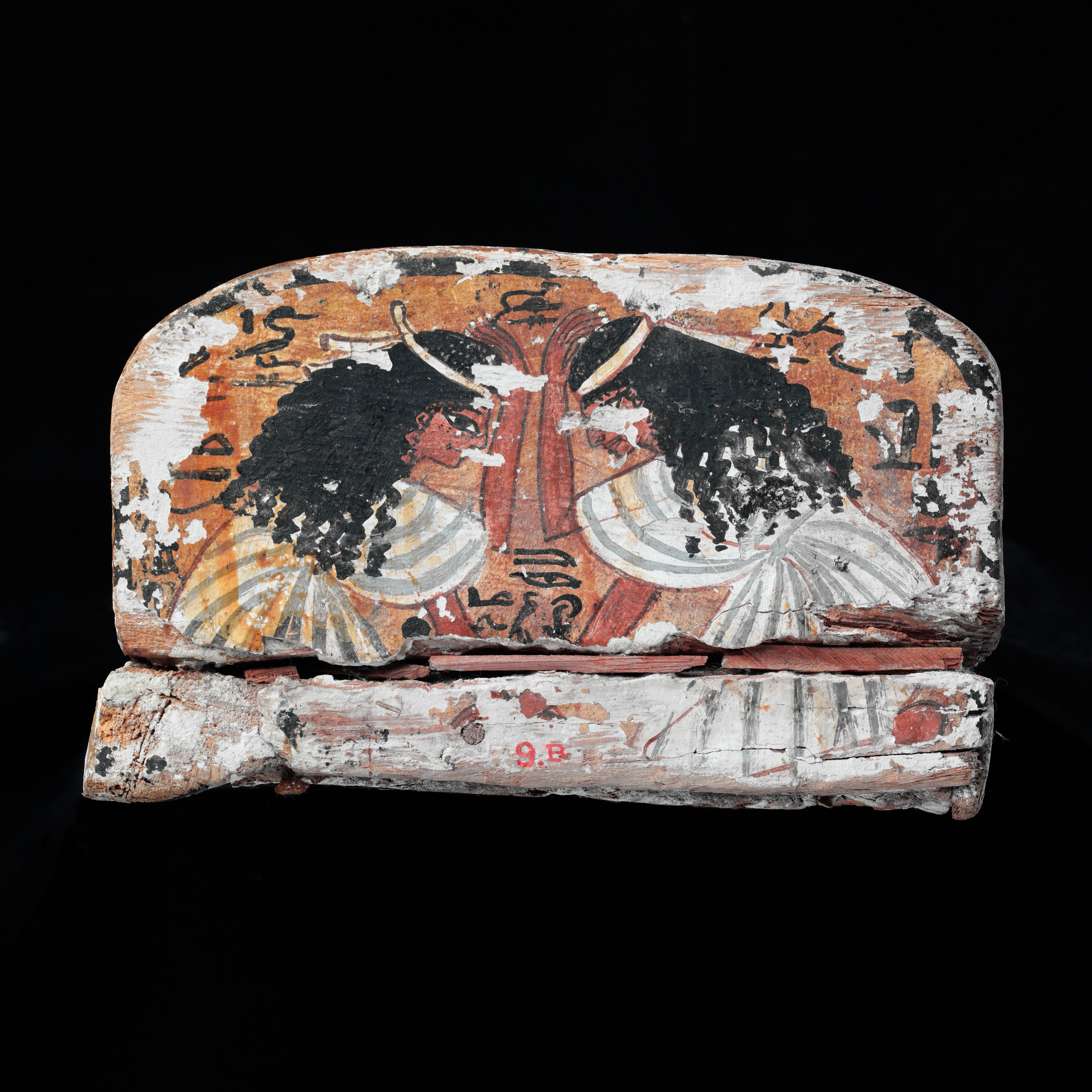
The foot of Iyneferti's mummy board depicting two of her daughters. The text between them reads: "She says: don't leave me!"

Iyneferti was buried in a mummiform coffin with a mummy board and mask. Her coffin lid depicts her as a wrapped mummy with her arms crossed over her chest and hands open. She wears a long wig with a floral fillet and ribbons, and a large collar with lotus terminals covers most of her chest. The inner mummy board depicts her in a long white dress; her left arm is bent over her chest. Two of her daughters are depicted kneeling and mourning under the feet of her mummy board; their pose and the position of the scene recalls the depictions of Isis and Nephthys who protect the deceased. Like her husband, she is also fitted with a mask, the design of which is almost identical to her coffin. Iyneferti's mummified body was wrapped in palm-rib matting and four layers of linen bandaging and padding. She wore a faience ring on each hand; one had the throne name of Amenhotep III on the bezel and the other had the name of Amun. Iyneferti was unwrapped in 1906 and in 1933 her body was examined in the Peabody Museum of Archaeology and Ethnology, Cambridge, Massachusetts. Her mummy was skeletonised but retained her long braided hair, coloured blonde by the embalming process. She died as an elderly woman of at least 75 years of age; she was toothless and had rheumatoid arthritis of the spine. She had a healed fracture (Colles' fracture) of her right wrist. She may have been blind towards the end of her life, based on a prayer dedicated by her to Thoth.

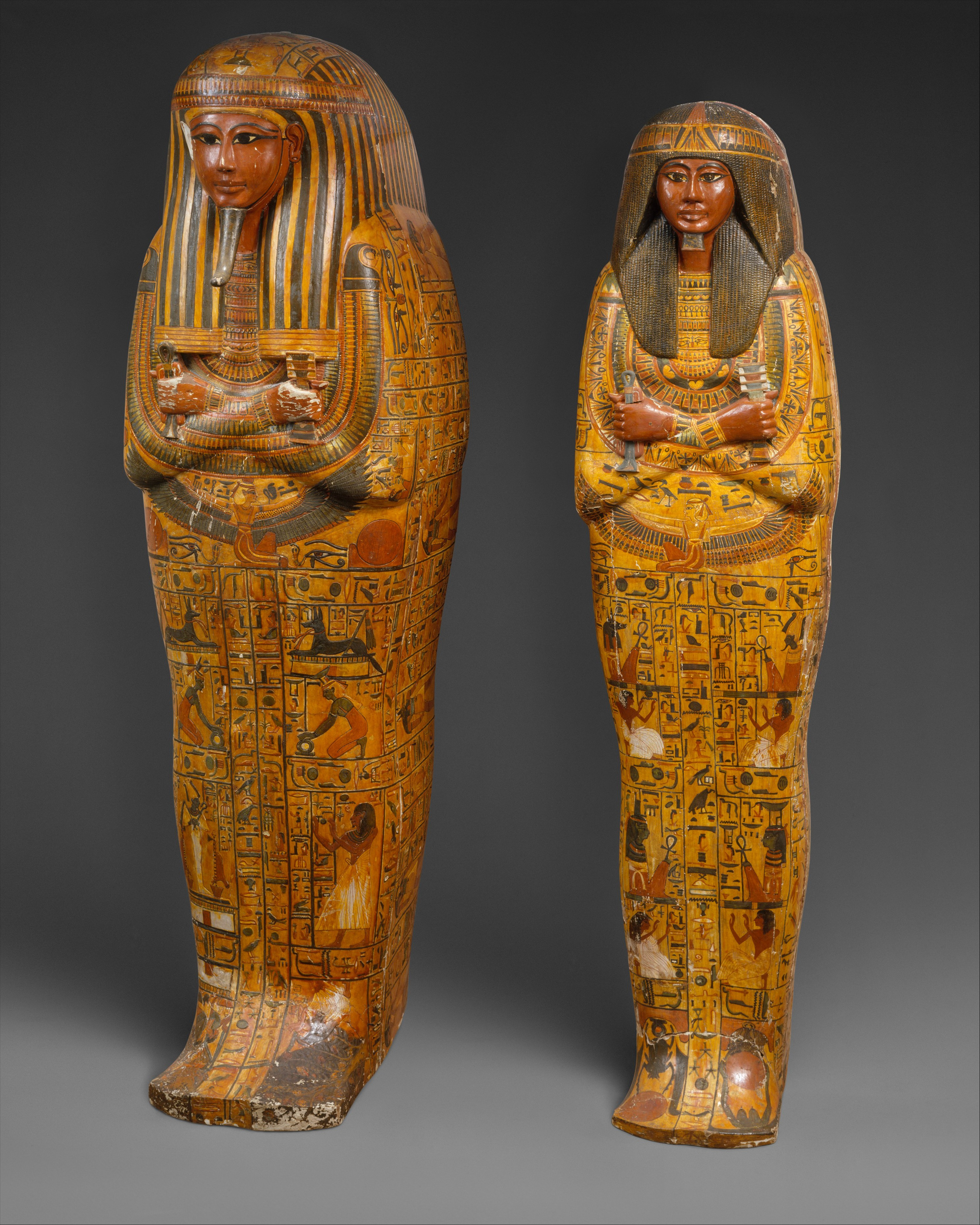
Inner coffins of Khonsu, Metropolitan Museum of Art

Khonsu was buried in a sarcophagus and coffin set similar to his father. His large rectangular sarcophagus was fitted with runners but lacked wheels; the decorative scheme is similar in content but has less defined registers. It too had been disassembled and placed against the west wall. His set of two nested mummiform coffins were found on Sennedjem's funerary bed. The outer coffin shows Khonsu wearing the striped wig and a divine curled beard. His arms are depicted crossed over his chest and he holds the tyet-knot and djed-pillar in his hands. The lid is divided by vertical and horizontal bands of text; the space between depicts Anubis as a jackal, mourning goddesses, and Khonsu himself adoring Osiris. The footboard depicts the sycamore goddess giving water to him and his wife Tamaket in human form and as ba-birds. His inner coffin depicts him wearing an elaborate wig and short beard. He again holds the djed and tyet in his hands. Below his arms is a winged goddess. The design of the lower half of the coffin is similar to the outer one; the footboard shows solar scenes. The set was completed with a mask, which is in Cairo. Like his mother Iyneferti, Khonsu's unwrapped body was transferred to the Peabody Museum and examined in 1933. He died aged between 50 and 60 years, had worn teeth and spinal arthritis. A necklace with faience beads was found on his body. He was also provided with a scarab pectoral.

Isis, the daughter of Khonsu and Tamaket, was buried with her parents in her grandfather's tomb. She was married to her uncle, Khabekhnet, who had his own chapel and tomb nearby in TT2. She was buried in a single coffin that Sousa characterises as "surprisingly 'archaic'". On the lid she is depicted in the dress of the living. She wears a long wig with a floral fillet topped with lotus flowers; two pairs of earrings (studs and hoops) emerge from her hair. Her left arm is bent across her chest, which is covered by a broad collar, and holds a trailing ivy vine. The trough of the coffin follows the same design as the earlier coffins of her family members. This style is contemporary with the late Eighteenth Dynasty, something that lead Sousa to suggest Isis was given or reused an antique coffin. Her body was also fitted with a mask, and her mummy was wrapped in reed matting.

Little is known about the rest of the occupants of the burial chamber. The coffin set (consisting of a coffin and mummy board) and mummy of Tamaket were purchased by the Egyptian Museum of Berlin; during World War II, her coffin (presumably containing her mummy) was transferred to Sophienhof Castle for safe keeping but was destroyed in 1945 when the castle was bombed. The remaining coffins, belonging to Ramose, Taashen, Prehotep, and Hathor, and the two foetuses are now lost. The identities of the uncoffined individuals of which only the heads were kept are unknown. A skull donated by Toda to the Biblioteca Museu Víctor Balaguer is from a woman aged in her thirties who is thought to be one of Sennedjem's daughters or granddaughters; the associated mandible belonged to an unknown man. Those interred without coffins are usually thought to belong to poorer family members who could not afford them. Alternatively, Cooney suggests they were originally interred in coffins but that the coffins were later removed for reuse or sale by family members later in the Nineteenth or Twentieth Dynasties.

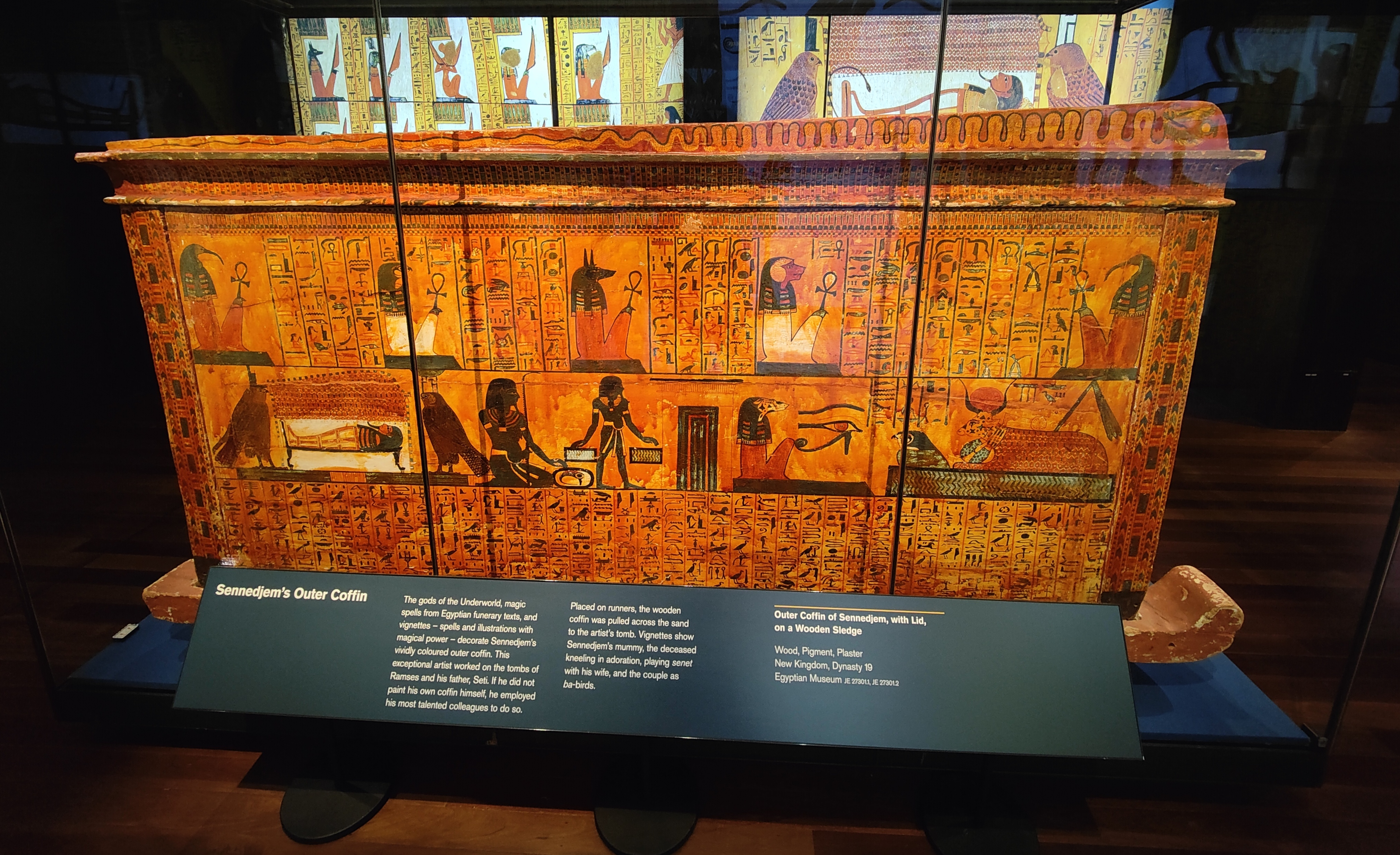
Sarcophagus or outer coffin of Sennedjem

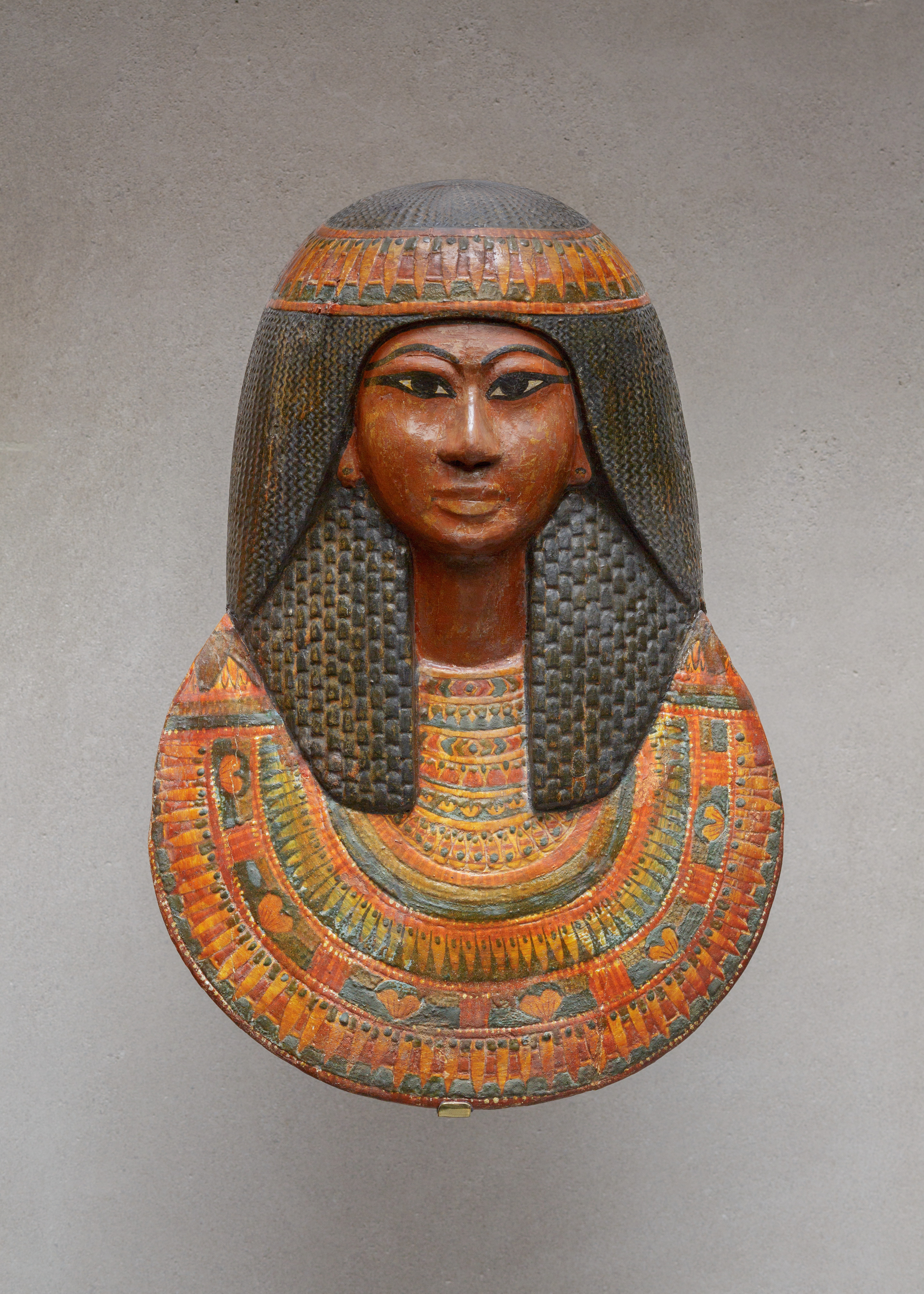
Funerary mask of Sennedjem, exhibited in the Metropolitan Museum of Art

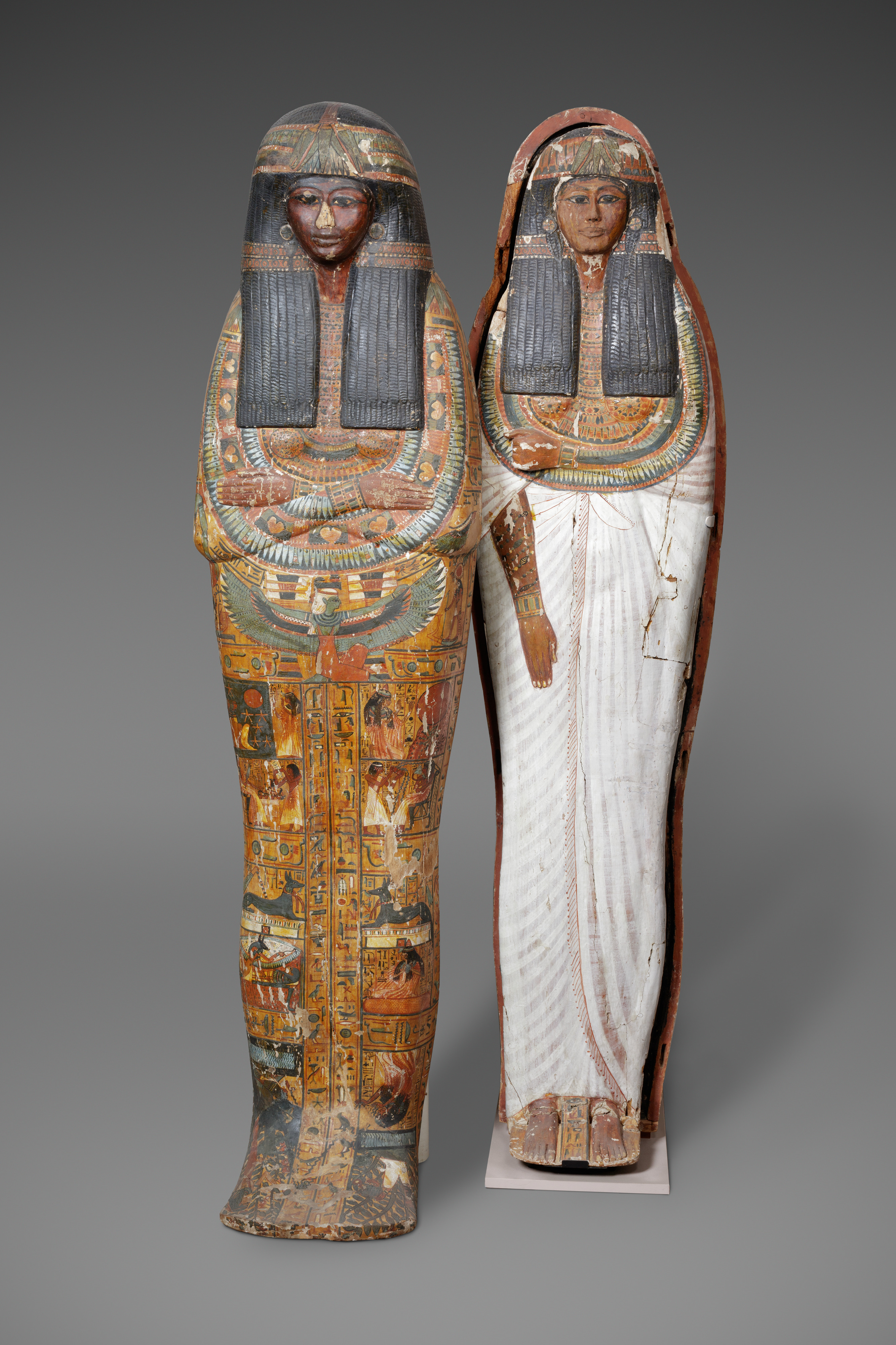
Coffin and mummy board of Iyneferti, Metropolitan Museum of Art

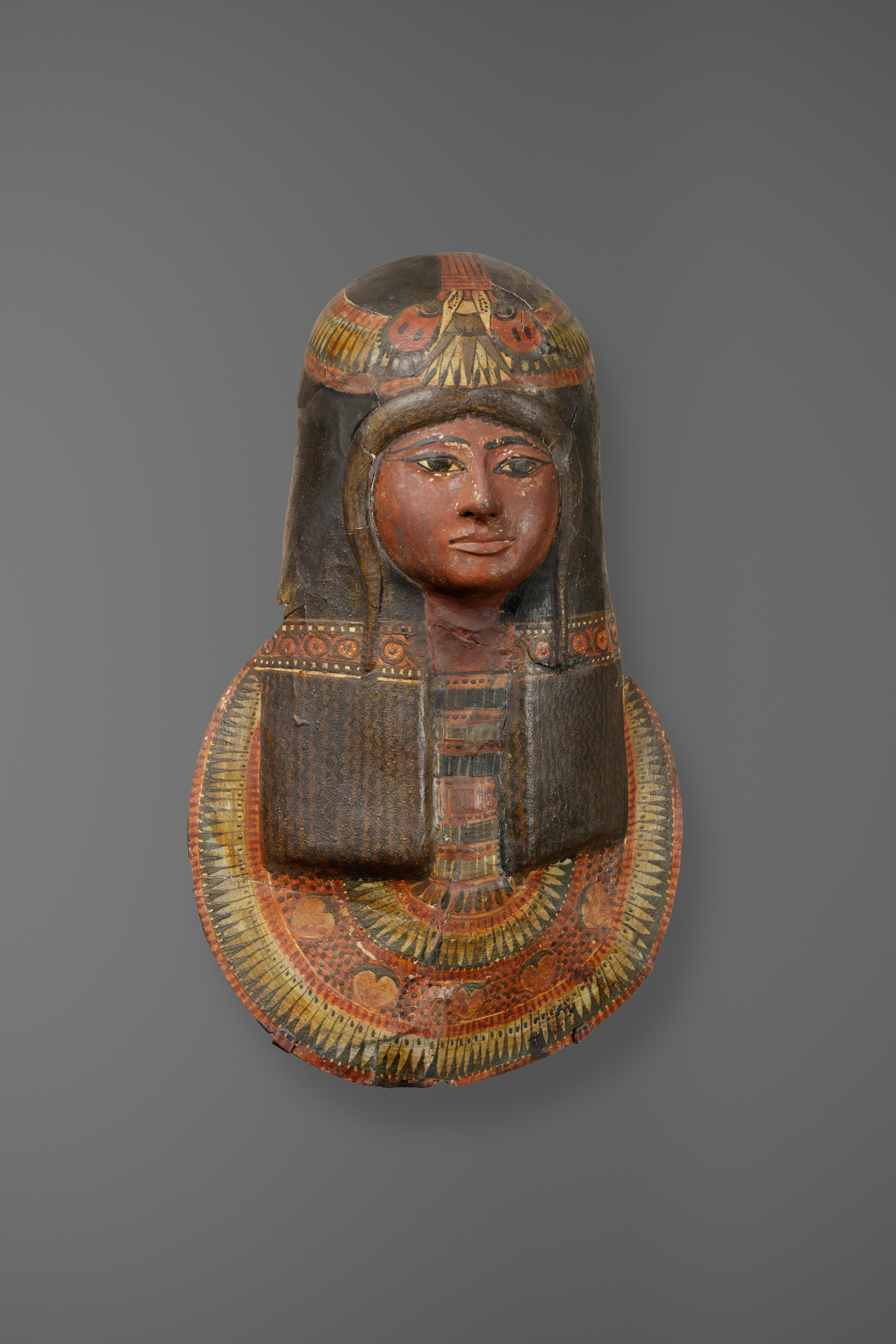
Mask of Iyneferti, Metropolitan Museum of Art

=== Canopics and other funerary equipment ===
Canopic chests are known to exist for Sennedjem, Iyneferti, Khonsu, Tamaket, and Isis. All the chests are shaped like a shrine with a sloping roof and are painted with figures of the goddesses Isis, Nephthys, Neith, and Serket and speeches by each taken from the Book of the Dead. Each organ was dried and wrapped and placed in ceramic jars inside the chests. Sennedjem's mummified and wrapped organs were placed in mummiform canopic coffins instead of canopic jars. Each small coffin was wrapped in fabric and inscribed with the name of the son of Horus associated with the respective organ.

A total of 24 ushabti boxes and 74 ushabti were found in the tomb. All of the boxes are decorated and most are inscribed with the names of their owners. Sennedjem has no ushabti box but has three ushabti placed in their own mummiform coffins. Most of the ushabti are shaped like mummies, while some are shown wearing clothing; the two forms likely reflect the two coffin styles in use at the time. A few ushabti are inscribed for individuals who were not buried in the tomb, such as Khabekhnet. These were probably included as gifts for the burial.

Sennedjem was provided with a funerary statuette. It depicts him in daily dress, wearing a wig, tunic and long kilt. An offering passage inscribed down the front of the kilt asks that he receive "everything which goes forth upon the offering table of Amun in Ipet-sut... for the ka of Sennedjem, justified, happy in peace".

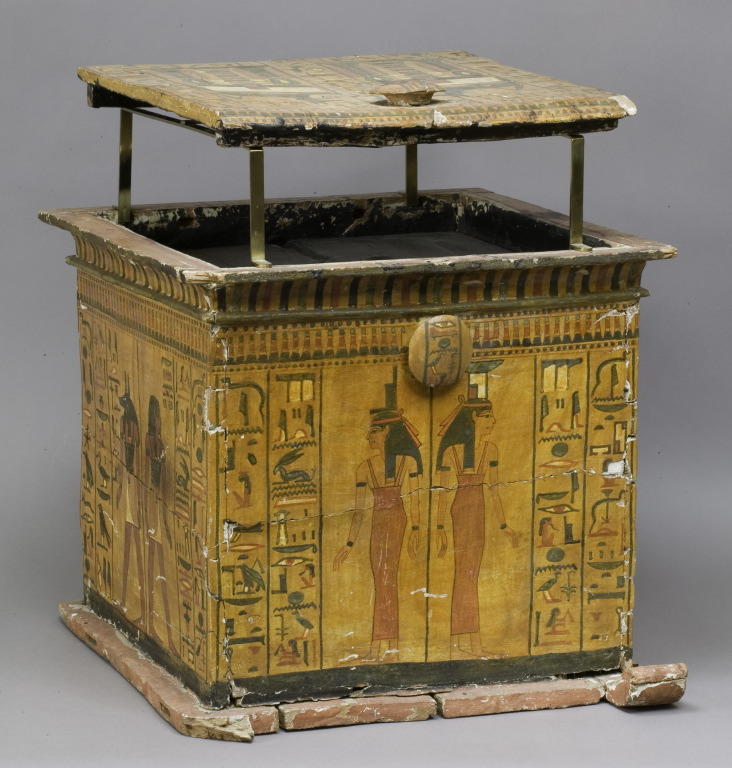
Canopic chest of Khonsu, Metropolitan Museum of Art

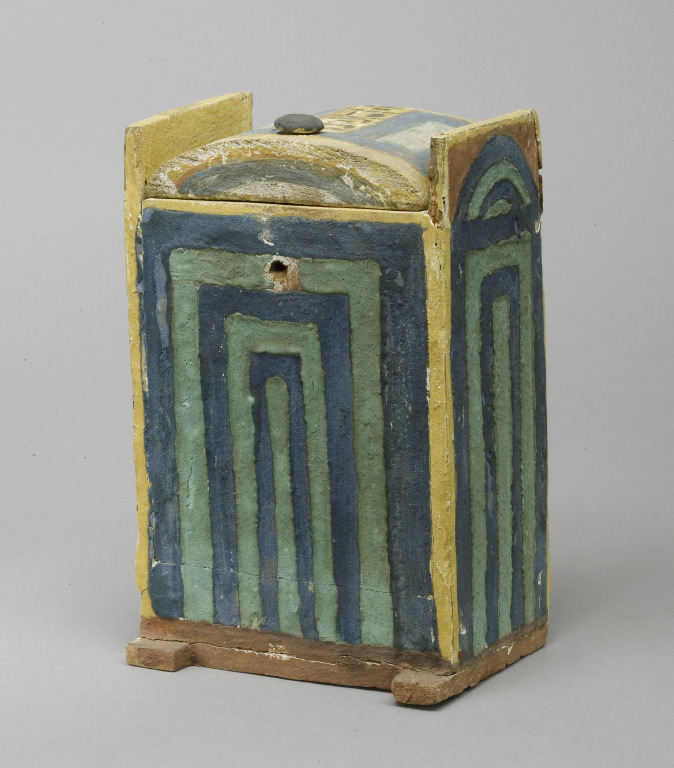
Ushabti box of Khabekhnet

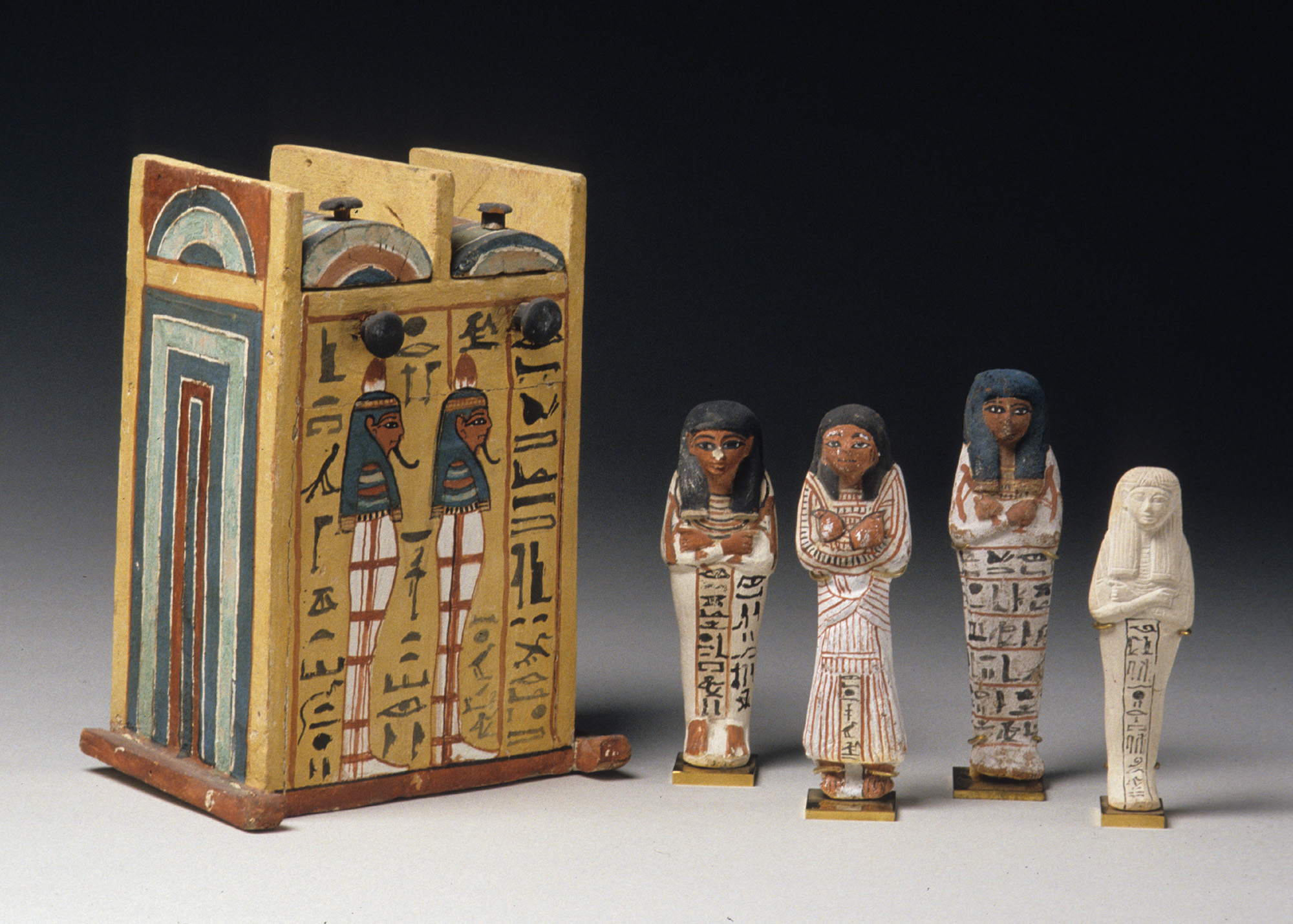
Ushabti box of Paramnekhu and assorted ushabti of Khabekhnet, Iyneferti, and Ramose Metropolitan Museum of Art

== Dispersal ==
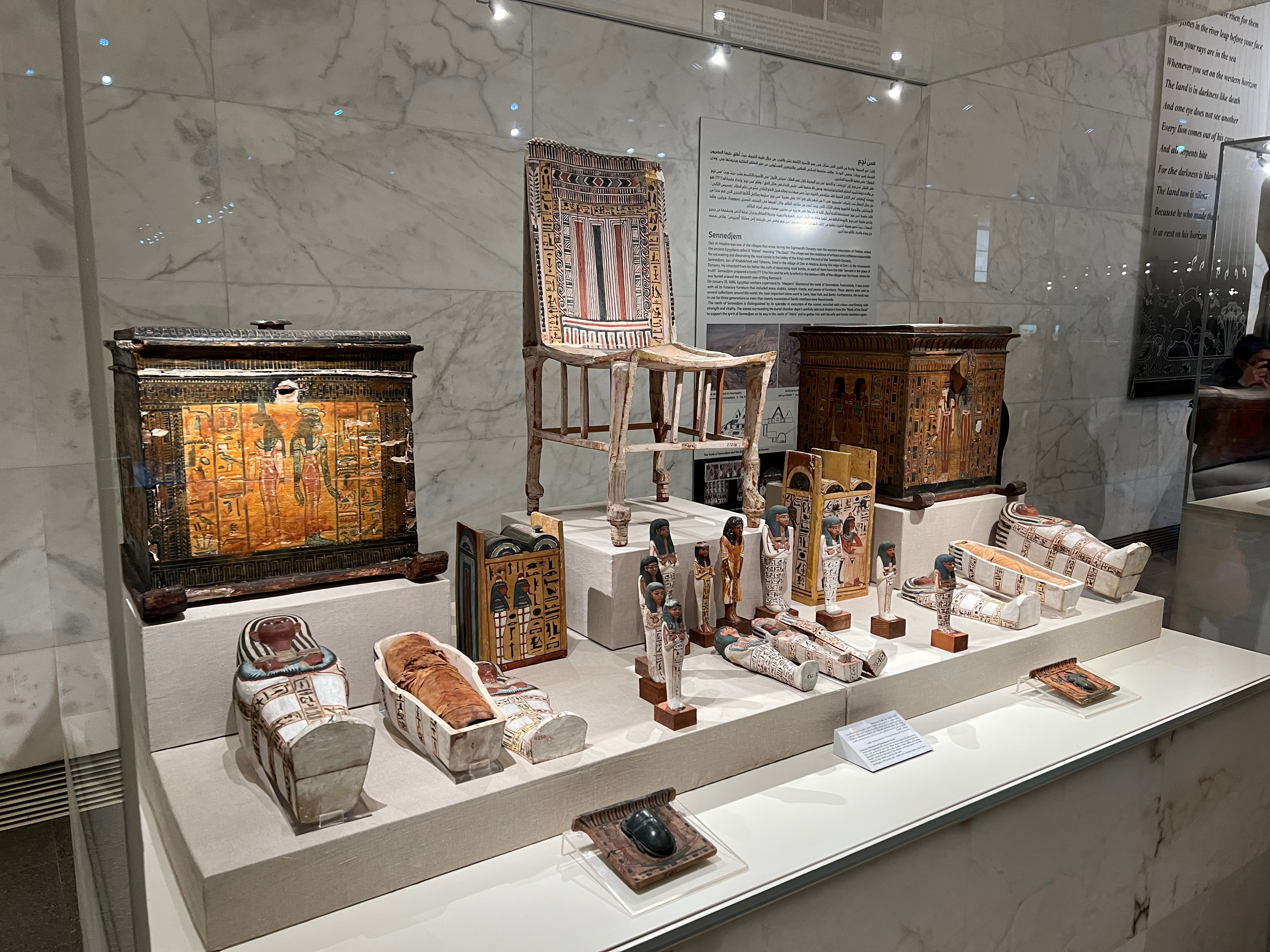
A selection of the tomb's contents on display in the National Museum of Egyptian Civilization in 2022

The Boulaq Museum in Cairo lacked the space to properly house the contents of TT1; key pieces were placed on display while the rest was kept in storerooms or in outside areas. Maspero offered mummies and artefacts for sale, writing to his wife Louise that he hoped to get 60 or 80 guineas to fund the excavation of the Great Sphinx of Giza and Luxor's temples. Sennedjem, his coffin set and sarcophagus remained in Cairo, as did his granddaughter Isis. As of September 2019, the coffins and mummies of Sennedjem and Isis were housed in the National Museum of Egyptian Civilisation. (Note: News reports say that the additional coffin set moved with Sennedjem was that of his wife. This cannot be the case as Iyneferti's coffin is housed in the Metropolitan Museum. The coffin set must be that of his granddaughter Isis. Maspero referred to the coffin set of Isis as the coffin set of Iyneferti in 1887.)

Tracing the dispersal of items is difficult as no complete inventory of the objects sold is available. 29 items from the tomb were bought by the Metropolitan Museum of Art in New York which included the mummies and funerary assemblages of Iyneferti and Khonsu. The coffin set of Tamaket, wife of Khonsu, as well as an ushabti each of Sennedjem and Khonsu and a box belonging to Ramose were bought by the Egyptian Museum of Berlin. Other pieces were sold to various museums, the exact locations of which are now unknown. Maspero purchased several ushabti and an ushabti box for his wife; these are now housed in the Louvre, Paris and the Museum of Fine Arts of Lyon, France.
