= Sennedjem =

Ancient Egyptian artisan

- Servant in the Place of Truth
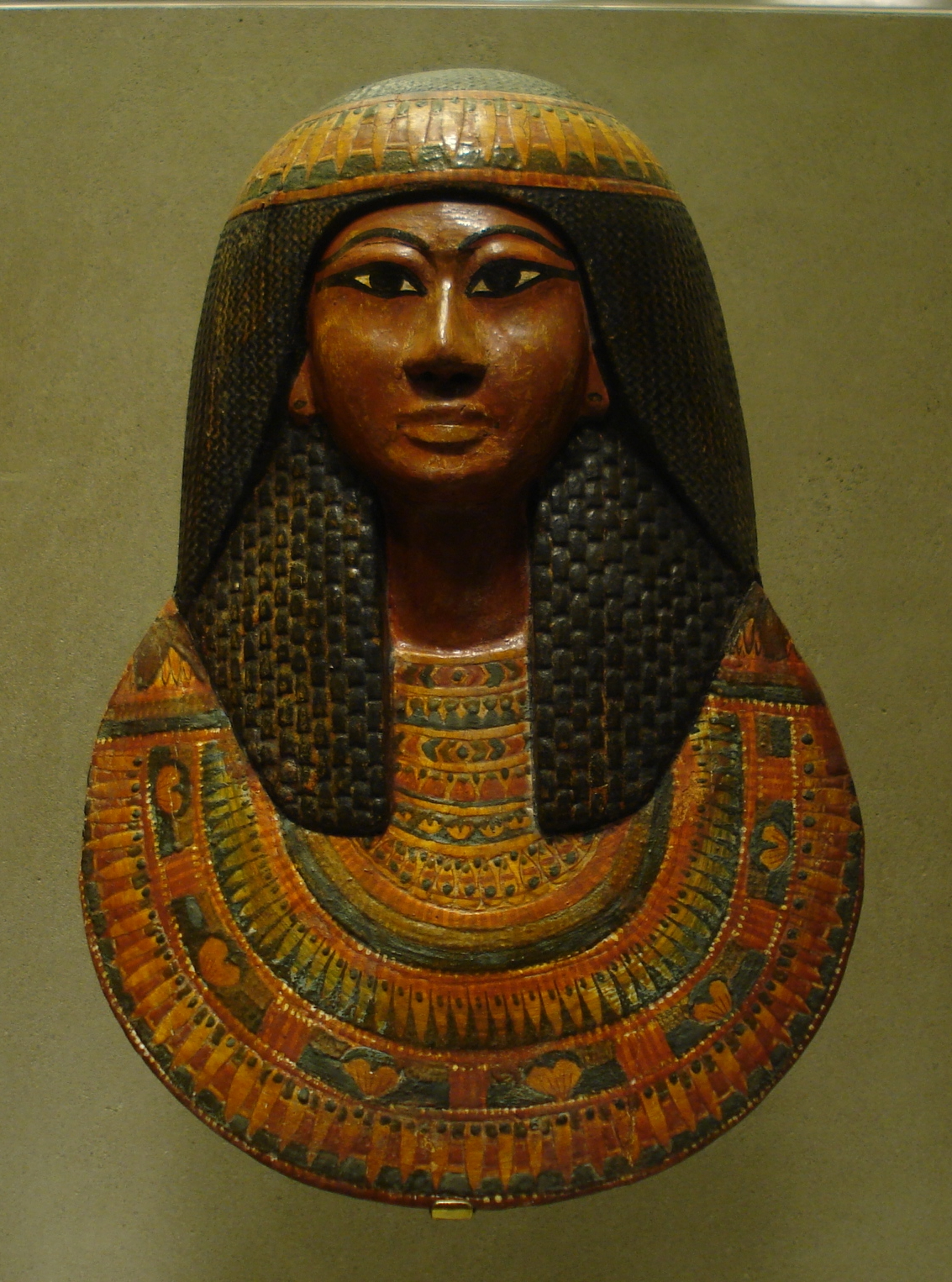
- Funerary mask of Sennedjem or his son Khonsu
Egyptian name
T23 N35 M29 Aa15 Y1
- Dynasty: 19th Dynasty
- Pharaoh: Seti I and Ramesses II
- Burial: TT1
- Spouse: Iyneferti
- Father: Khabekhnet
- Mother: Tahenu
- Siblings: Tjaro, Tutuya, Messu
- Children: at least 10, including Khabekhnet and Khonsu

Sennedjem was an Ancient Egyptian artisan who was active during the reigns of Seti I and Ramesses II. He lived in Set Maat (translated as "The Place of Truth"), contemporary Deir el-Medina, on the west bank of the Nile, opposite Thebes. Sennedjem had the title "Servant in the Place of Truth". He was buried along with his wife, Iyneferti, and members of his family in a tomb in the village necropolis. His tomb was discovered on January 31, 1886. When Sennedjem's tomb was found, it contained furniture from his home, including a stool and a bed, which he used when he was alive.

== Career and family ==
Sennedjem was an ancient Egyptian official active in the early Nineteenth Dynasty during the reigns of the pharaohs Seti I and Ramesses II. He bore the title "servant in the Place of Truth" (sḏm ꜥš m s.t mꜣꜥ.t), which indicates he was part of the community of royal tomb builders at Deir el-Medina. He may have been a scribe, based on the presence of an ostracon of the Tale of Sinuhe placed near his coffin. Sennedjem was involved in the cult of the goddess Hathor, bearing the title "servant of Hathor". His mummy has not been X-rayed or CT-scanned, so nothing is known about his health or age at death.

His father was Khabekhnet, whose title is "servant of Amun in the southern City". Tahenu (or Taha(y)nu) is thought to be his mother. Khabekhnet and Tahenu are depicted with an additional woman named Rusu, whose relationship to the couple is not specified. She may have been a second wife of Khabekhnet or Khabekhnet's own mother. Sennedjem had a probable elder brother named Tjaro and likely two further brothers named Tutuya (or Tutuia) and Messu (or Mose).

Sennedjem's wife was Iyneferti. She is titled "lady of the house" (nb.t-pr) and "singer of Hathor" (ḥs.t n(t) Hw.t-Ḥr). Little is known of her family but her mother may have been a woman named Mutnofret. Examination of her body in 1933 estimated she died as an elderly woman of at least 75 years of age. She was toothless and had spinal arthritis. She may have been blind in her old age, as a stele dedicated by her and her son Anhotep asks the lunar form of the god Thoth and a form of the sun god to "be merciful to me, for you have caused me to see darkness by day".

Sennedjem and Iyneferti had at least 10 known children, many of whom are depicted in their tomb and also worked in the royal necropolis. Their eldest son Khabekhnet, named for his paternal grandfather, was the owner of the nearby tomb TT2. A younger son, Khonsu, had a pyramid chapel within his father's tomb complex and was buried in his father's tomb. Sennedjem and one or two of his sons lived in a cluster of houses in the newly built southern part of Deir el-Medina, close to the family tomb.

== Tomb ==
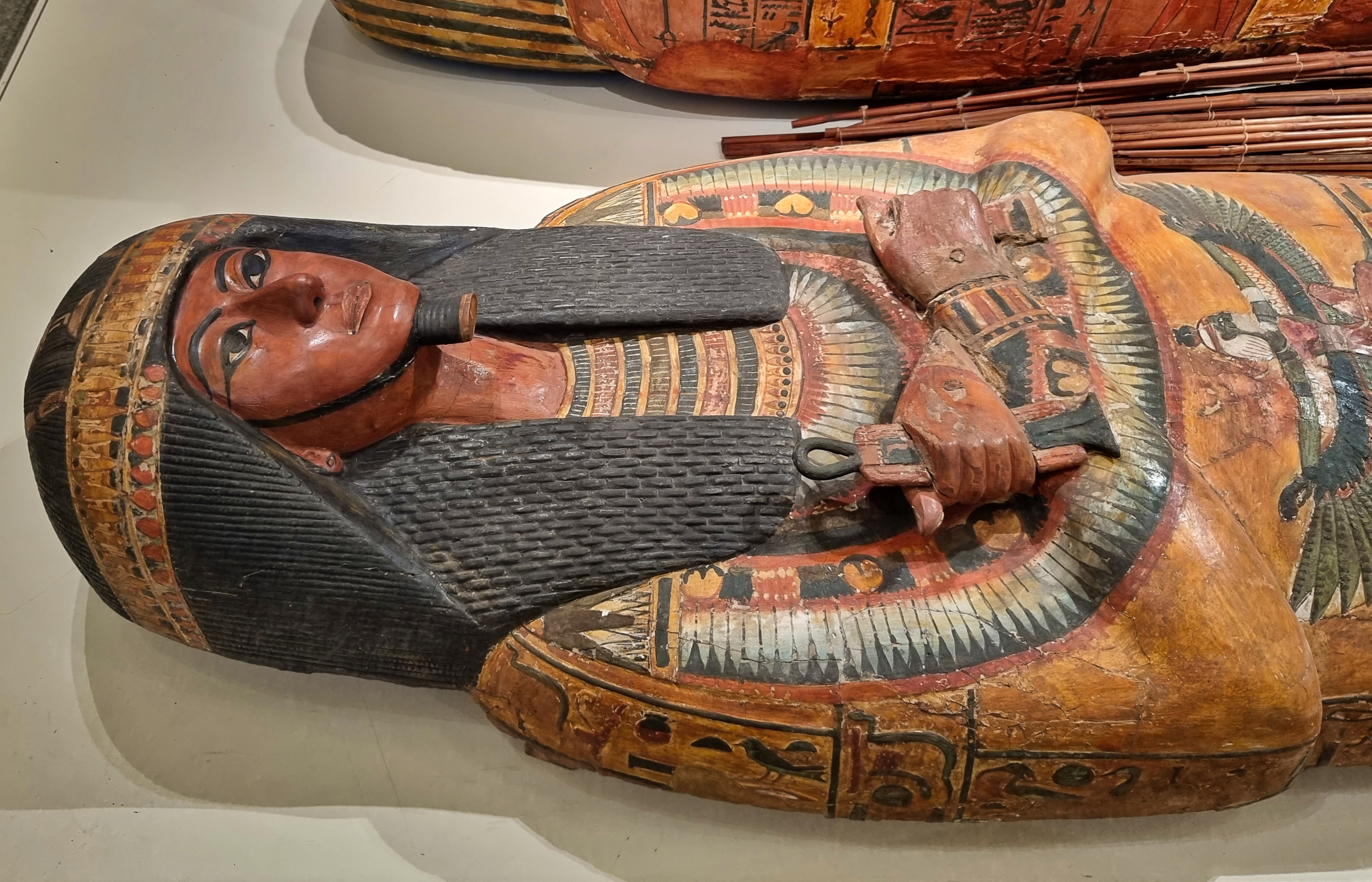
Outer coffin of Sennedjem

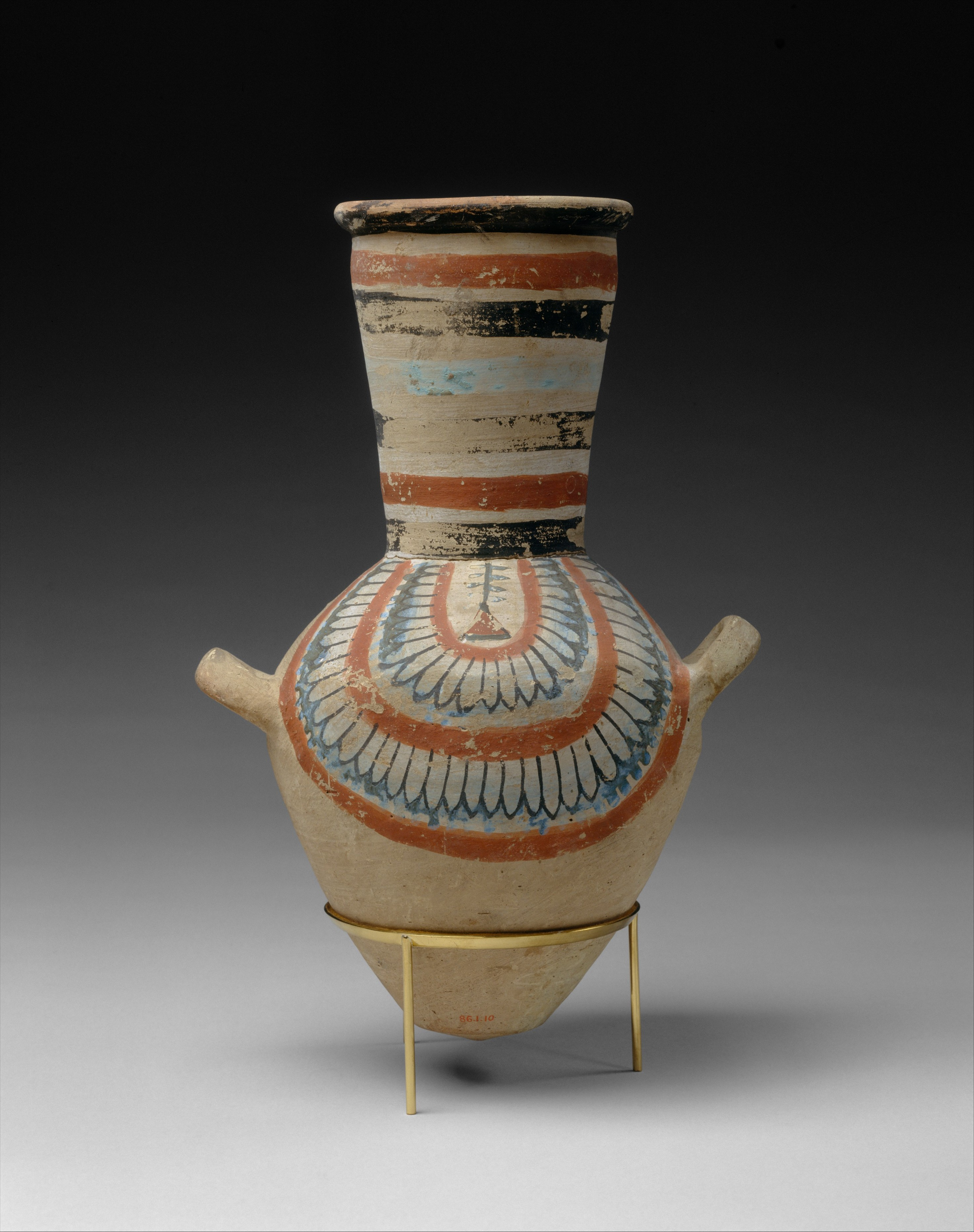
An intact wine jar from the Tomb of Sennedjem

Sennedjem and his family had a tomb, now numbered TT1, at the southern end of the Deir el-Medina necropolis. The funerary complex contains three pyramid-shaped chapels within a walled courtyard. Sennedjem's chapel is the central of the three. It was constructed of a mix of mudbrick and stone, as was typical for the Nineteenth Dynasty. This chapel is flanked on the north side by the smaller pyramid-chapel of Khonsu. Due to lack of space, its walls are initially vertical before sloping to become a pyramid. A wall divided the chapels of Sennedjem and Khonsu from the larger southernmost pyramid chapel. It is the oldest of the three, being constructed entirely of mudbrick and therefore dating its construction to the Eighteenth Dynasty. The southern pyramid chapel is assigned to Tjaro, thought to be Sennedjem's elder brother or Khabekhnet, Sennedjem's father. The southern chapel was never used as the burial shaft is unfinished.

The intact burial chamber of TT1 was discovered in January 1886 by Gurnawi local Salam Abu Duhi and three others. They had obtained permission from Gaston Maspero, the director of the Antiquities Service, to look for tombs in Deir el-Medina. After seven days of excavation, they found an intact burial shaft that led to a series of underground rooms. The tomb descended further via a concealed shaft leading to a painted doorway closed with a decorated door sealed with a moulded clay seal in the shape of the head of Anubis. On 31 January, Maspero was informed of the find and visited with Urbain Bouriant, Eduardo Toda y Güell, and Jan Herman Insinger on 1 February. The painted burial chamber contained the burials of at least 20 people who were accompanied by a wide variety of objects. Both coffined and uncoffined mummies were placed against the west wall of the chamber, while funerary equipment such as disassembled funerary shrines, canopic chests, and ushabti, were mixed with work tools, boxes, vases, furniture, food, and bouquets. Those interred in the tomb included Sennedjem, his wife Iyneferti, and some of their children, including Khonsu and his wife Tamaket, Parahotep, Taashen, Ramose, and Hathor, and grandchildren such as Isis, daughter of Khonsu. Two infants were buried in wooden boxes. Nine burials were in coffins (eight adults, one child), and 11 individuals were buried without coffins. The bodies of the child and the two foetuses were given floral garlands.
