= Khabekhnet =

Ancient Egyptian artisan

xa a Y1 b x n t pr
Khabekhnet
in hieroglyphs
Era: New Kingdom
(1550–1069 BC)

Khabekhnet was an Ancient Egyptian artisan. Khabekhnet lived in Deir el-Medina on the west bank of the Nile, opposite Thebes, during the reign of Ramesses II. He was a son of Sennedjem and Iyneferti, and was married to Sahti and probably Isis. He was buried in Tomb TT2 in the village necropolis.

His titles included Servant in the Place of Truth, meaning that he worked on the excavation and decoration of the nearby royal tombs.

The scenes in TT2 show many of the relatives of both Khabekhnet and Sahte. Khabekhnet's children include his sons Sennedjem II (named after his grandfather Sennedjem), Piay, Bakenanuy, Kha and likely men named Mose, Anhotep, Amenemheb are sons as well. Daughters include Webkhet, Mutemopet, Isis, Nofretkau and Henutweret. A statue additionally provides names of daughters Roy, Nodjemmut and Wabet.

Khabekhnet's brother Khons and sister Henutweret are mentioned as well as Sahte's brother Wadjshemsu and her sister Henutwa'ti. Sahte also appears in the tomb of her brother Nakhtamun (TT335). This scene places Khabekhnet and Sahte in the first half of the reign of Ramesses II.
