= TT217 =

Ancient Egyptian tomb

Theban tomb 217
- Burial site of Ipuy
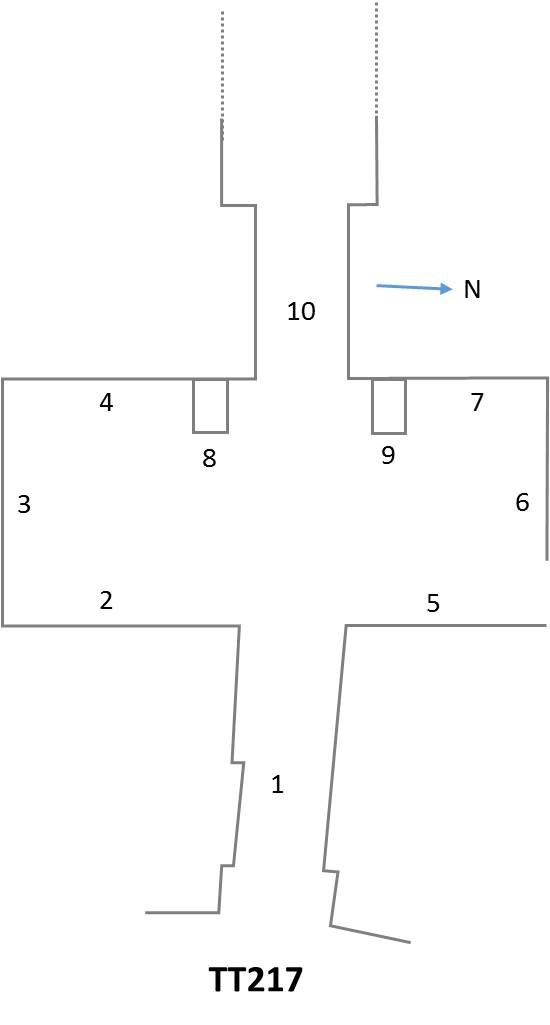
- Plan of TT217

- Location within Egypt
- Location: Deir el-Medina, Theban Necropolis
- Discovered: Before 1894
- Excavated by: Arthur Weigall (1911-12); Metropolitan Museum of Art (1912, 1920); Kathrin Gabler (2021-)
- ← Previous; TT216 Next → TT218

TT217, or Tomb of Ipuy, is the tomb of the ancient Egyptian artisan Ipuy and members of his family in Deir el-Medina, near modern Luxor, Egypt. Ipuy (also transcribed as Apy) was a sculptor active in the reign of Ramesses II of the Nineteenth Dynasty of Egypt.

TT217 is situated on the upper terrace in the western cemetery of the ancient workmen's village of Deir el-Medina. The complex consists of a chapel within a walled courtyard and at least 10 subterranean rooms. The chapel's decoration depicts craftsmen at work in addition to daily life scenes.

The tomb was first published by Jean-Vincent Scheil in 1894 but its location was later lost. The tomb was rediscovered by Arthur Weigall in his 1911-12 excavation season and subsequently excavated by the Metropolitan Museum in 1912 and 1920, and by Bernard Bruyère in the mid-1920s. Since 2020 Kathrin Gabler has carried out further investigation and documentation of the tomb.

== Gallery ==
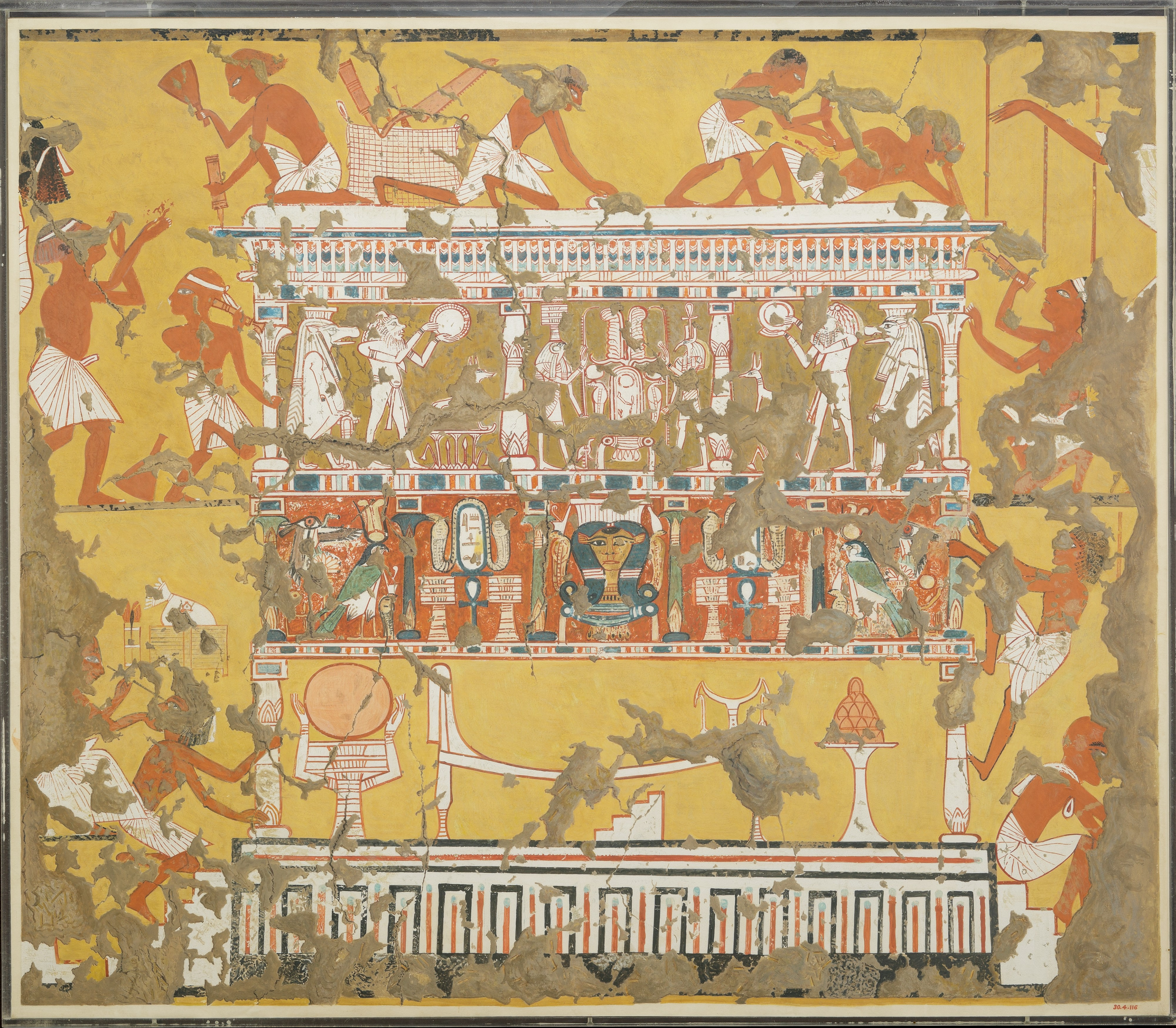
Building a Catafalque

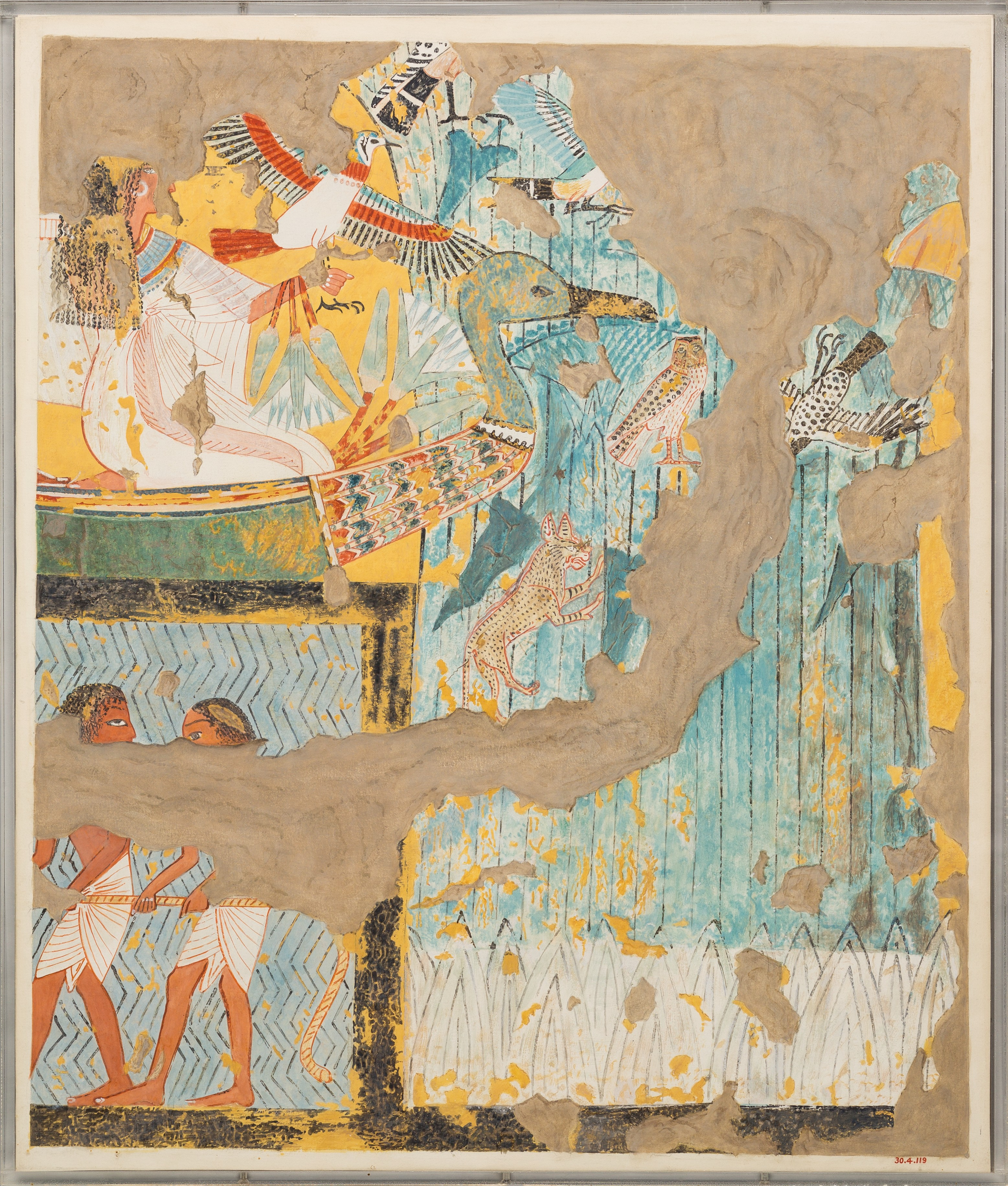
Fishing and Fowling

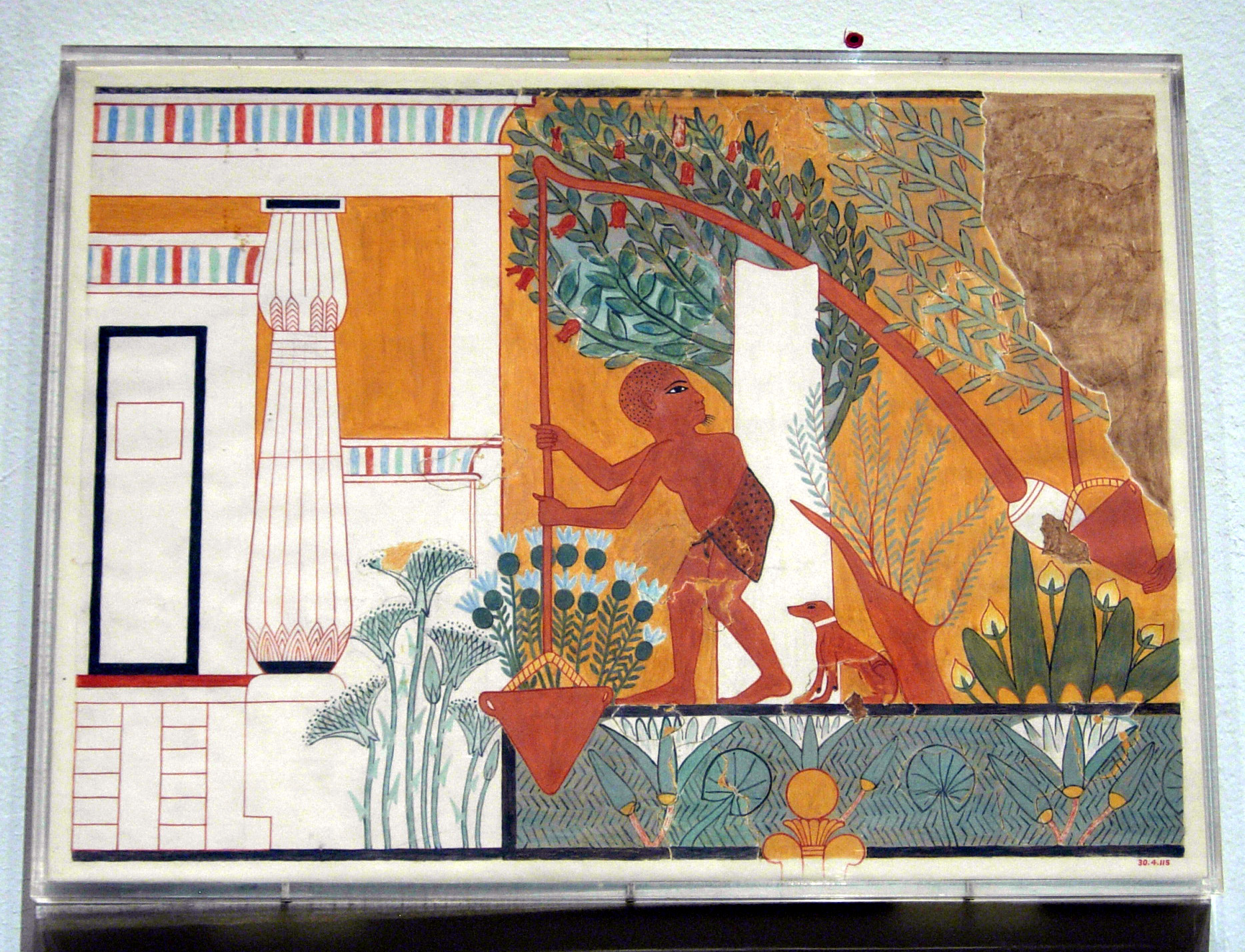
Garden Scene

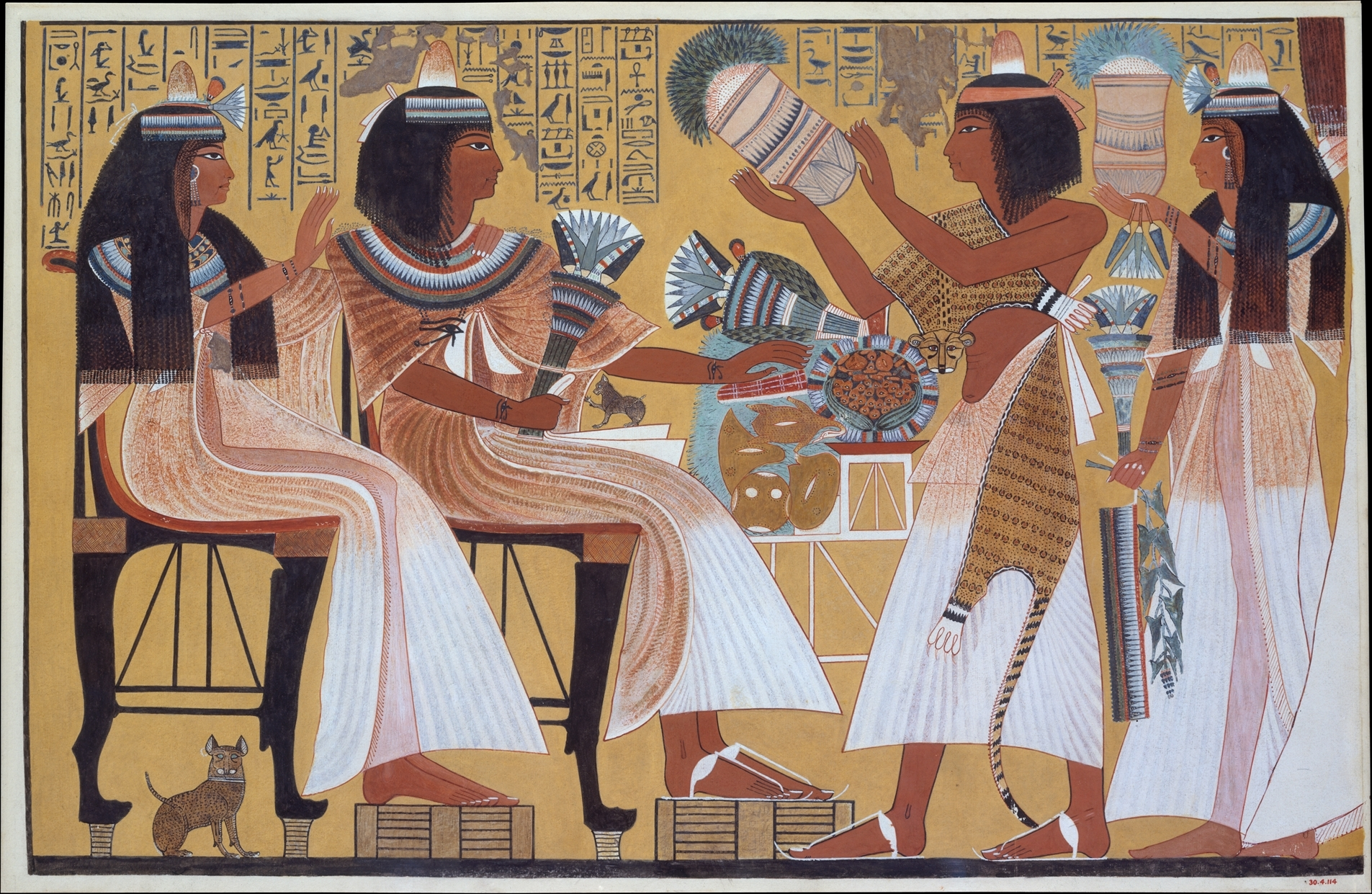
Ipuy and Wife Receive Offerings from Their Children (restored)

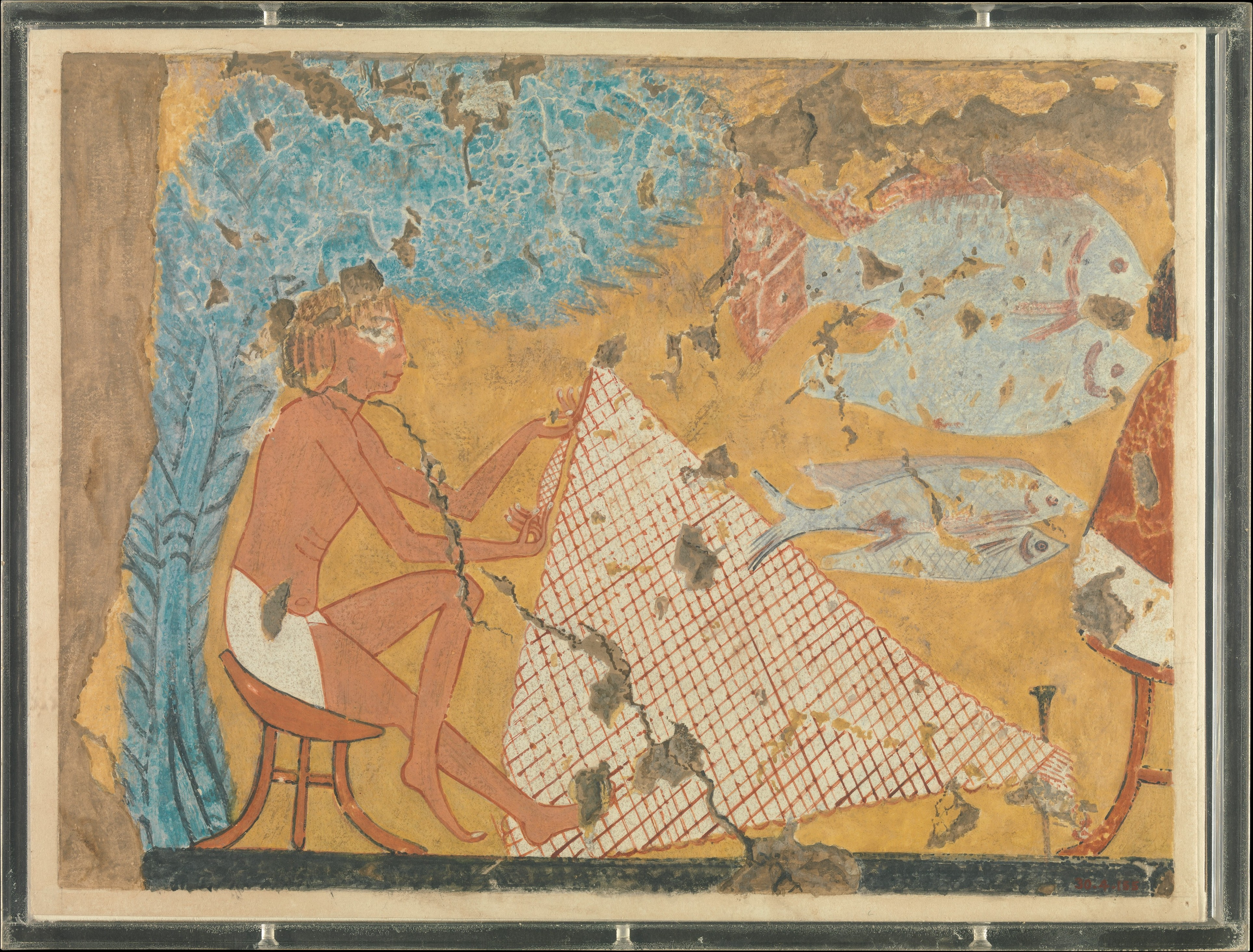
Man Making a Net

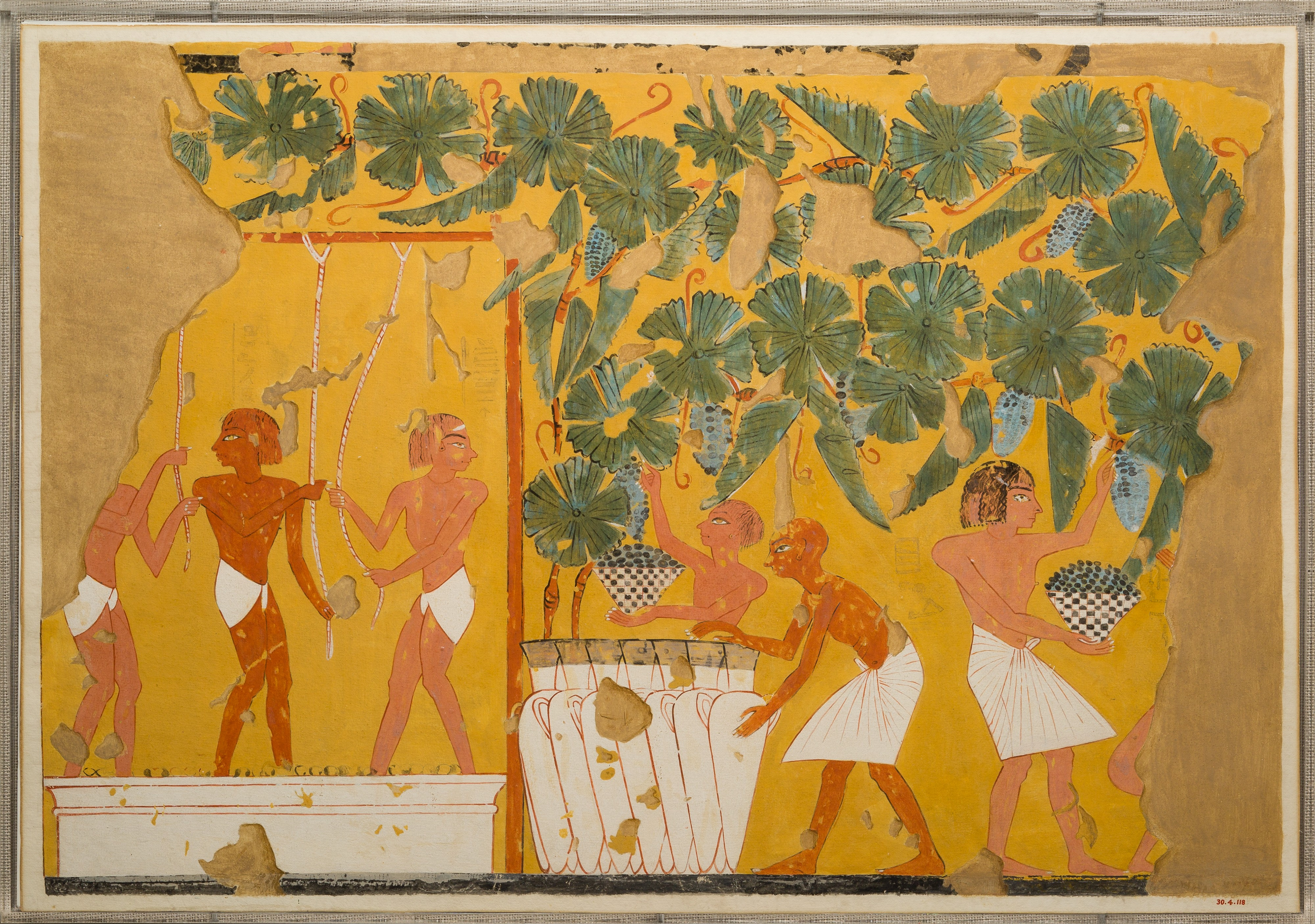
Winemaking
