= Naunakhte =

Naunakhte (fl c. 1145 BCE) was an Egyptian woman of the 20th Dynasty, who is best known from her will.

== Life ==
She lived in the workers' village at Deir el-Medina, and was married twice. Her first marriage was to Qenhirkhopsef, the head scribe of Deir el-Medina, who owned a large library of texts (and carved many pieces of graffiti around the area of the Valley of the Kings). When they married, Naunakhte was only 12-years-old, while her husband was in his 50s. After her first husband died, she married Khaemnun, a village workman. She had several children - most likely from her second marriage - totalling 4 sons and 4 daughters.

In the 1920s, archaeologists working at Deir el-Medina discovered 4 papyri that dealt with the inheritance of the estates of Naunakhte: the document as a whole is commonly known as the Will of Naunakhte. The so-called will is a transcript, recording the verbal statements Naunakhte made at court in Deir el-Medina, in October 1145 BCE, in the 3rd year of the reign of the pharaoh Ramses V.

Naunakhte, who was at that time quite elderly, probably around 80-years-old, stated that four of her children should not inherit any of her property, because they had not taken care of her in her old age. Though these children would inherit the property that once belonged to their father - Naunakhte's second husband Khaemnun - they would inherit nothing from her estate or that of her first husband.

Another court record, dating from a year later, suggests that Naunakhte had died, as Khaemnun returned to court, and requested that everything be done as Naunakhte had wished.

This will gives insight into the rights of Egyptian women during the 20th Dynasty, as well as law, and family dynamics, including expectations of children's behaviour towards elderly parents. For instance, the will shows that Naunakhte was able to inherit property from her own father, and that property remained hers during both of her marriages.
