= TT219 =

Ancient Egyptian tomb

Theban tomb 219
- Burial site of Nebenmaat
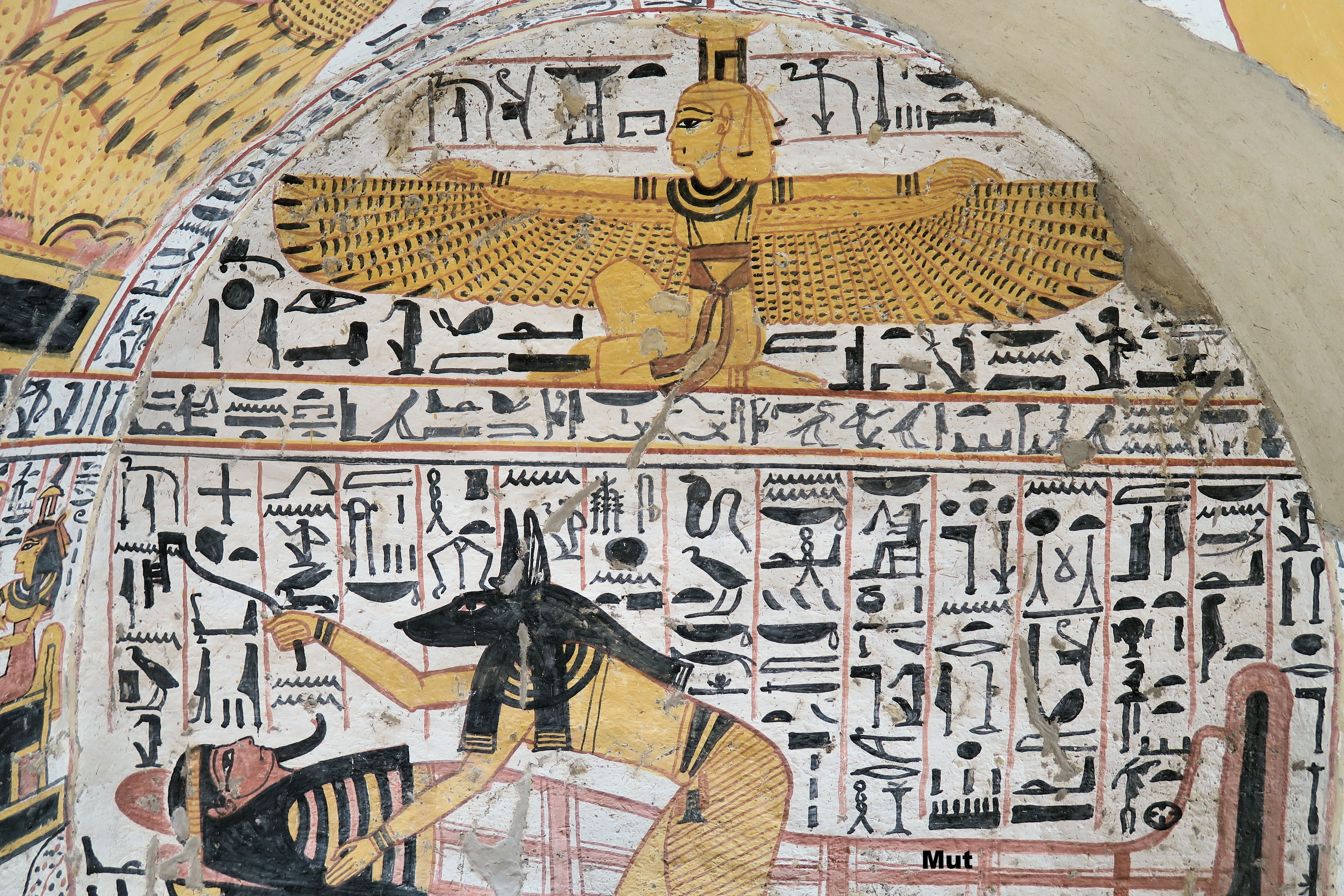
- Anubis with the tool for the opening of the mouth ceremony (below) of Nebenmaat and the winged goddess Nephthys (above)

- Location within Egypt
- Location: Deir el-Medina, Theban Necropolis
- Discovered: 1928
- Excavated by: Bernard Bruyère
- ← Previous; TT218 Next → TT220

TT219, or "Tomb of Nebenmaat”, is the tomb of the ancient Egyptian artisan Nebenmaat and members of his family in Deir el-Medina, near modern Luxor, Egypt. Nebenmaat was the son of the owner of tomb TT218, Amennakht who, as Nebenmaat's father, was the first to build his tomb in this area. Tomb TT219 along with the neighbouring family tombs TT218 and TT220 was discovered in 1928 by the French Egyptologist Bernard Bruyère.

== Overview ==
Tomb TT220 belongs to Amennakht's second son, the workman Khaemteri and Nebenmaat’s brother. All three individuals were active during the long reign of king Ramesses II of the Nineteenth Dynasty of Egypt.

Nebemaat himself served as an artisan who decorated tombs in the Valley of the Kings.

The importance of these Theban Tombs TT218, TT 219 and TT220 rely on the fact that they form a group belonging to a single family, i.e. the family of the workman Amennakht.

== Architecture of TT219 ==
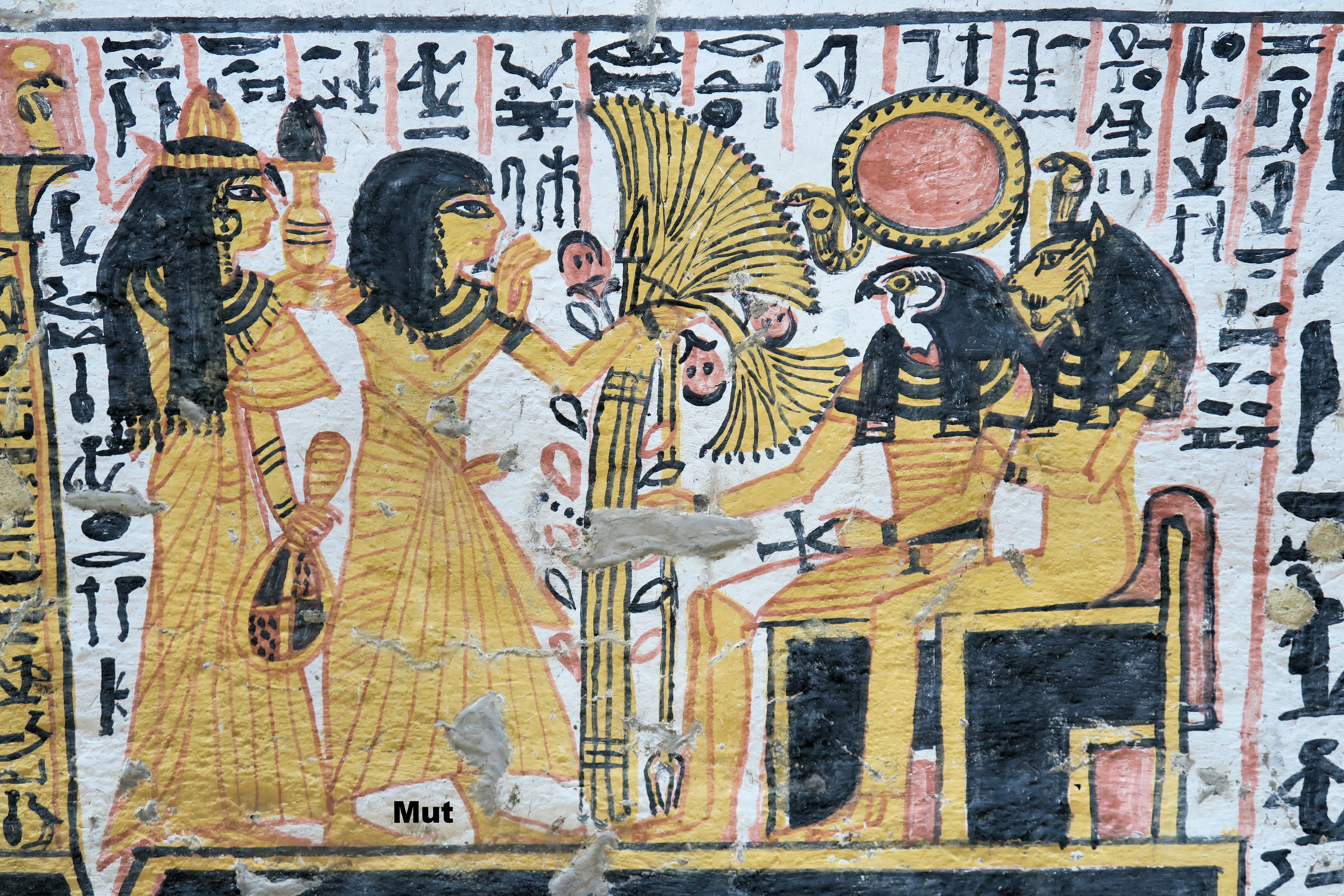
Nebenmaat's son Wepwautmosi and his wife offers a bouquet of flowers to Ra and Sekhmet in the afterlife in Theban Tomb TT219.

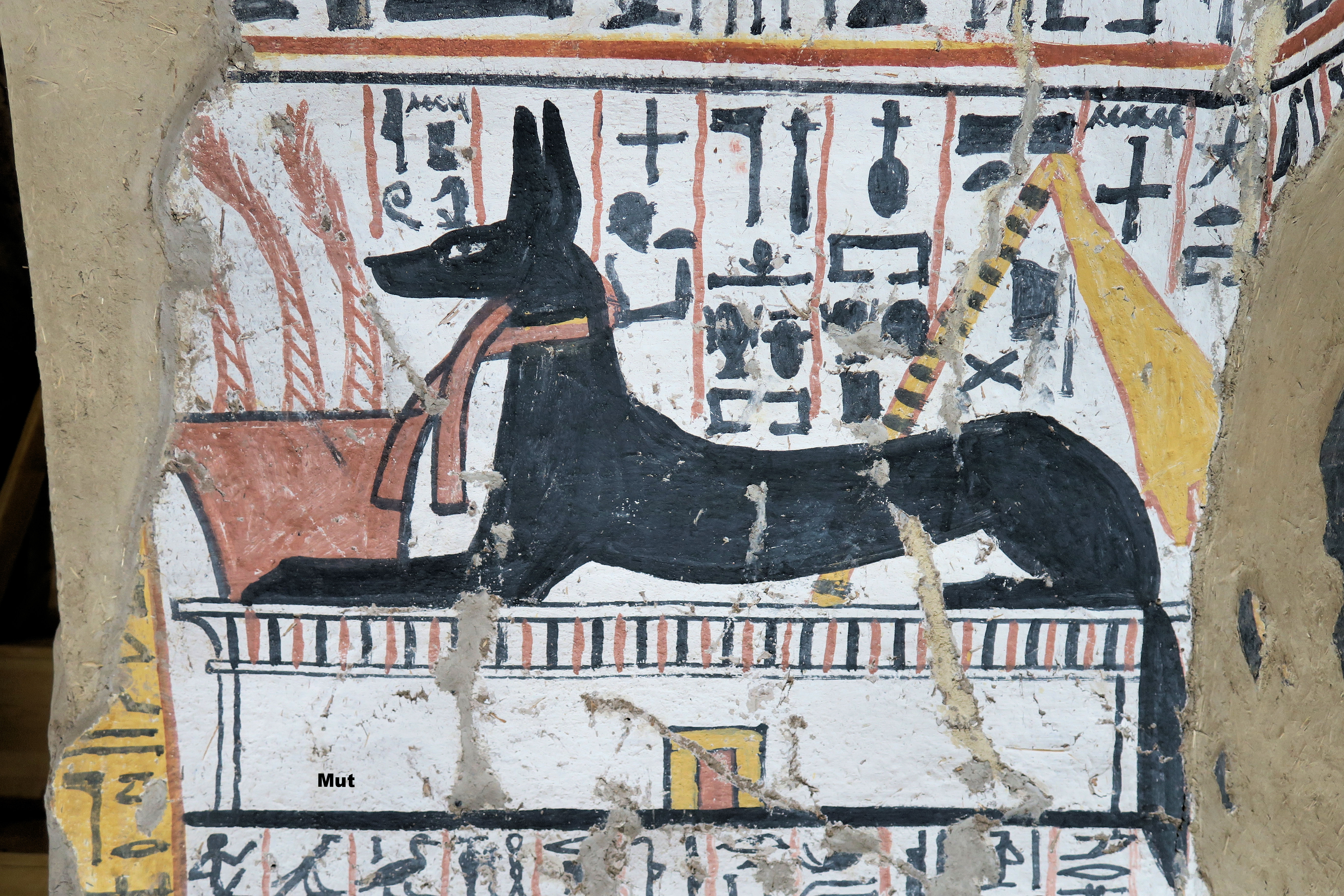
Anubis in Theban Tomb TT219

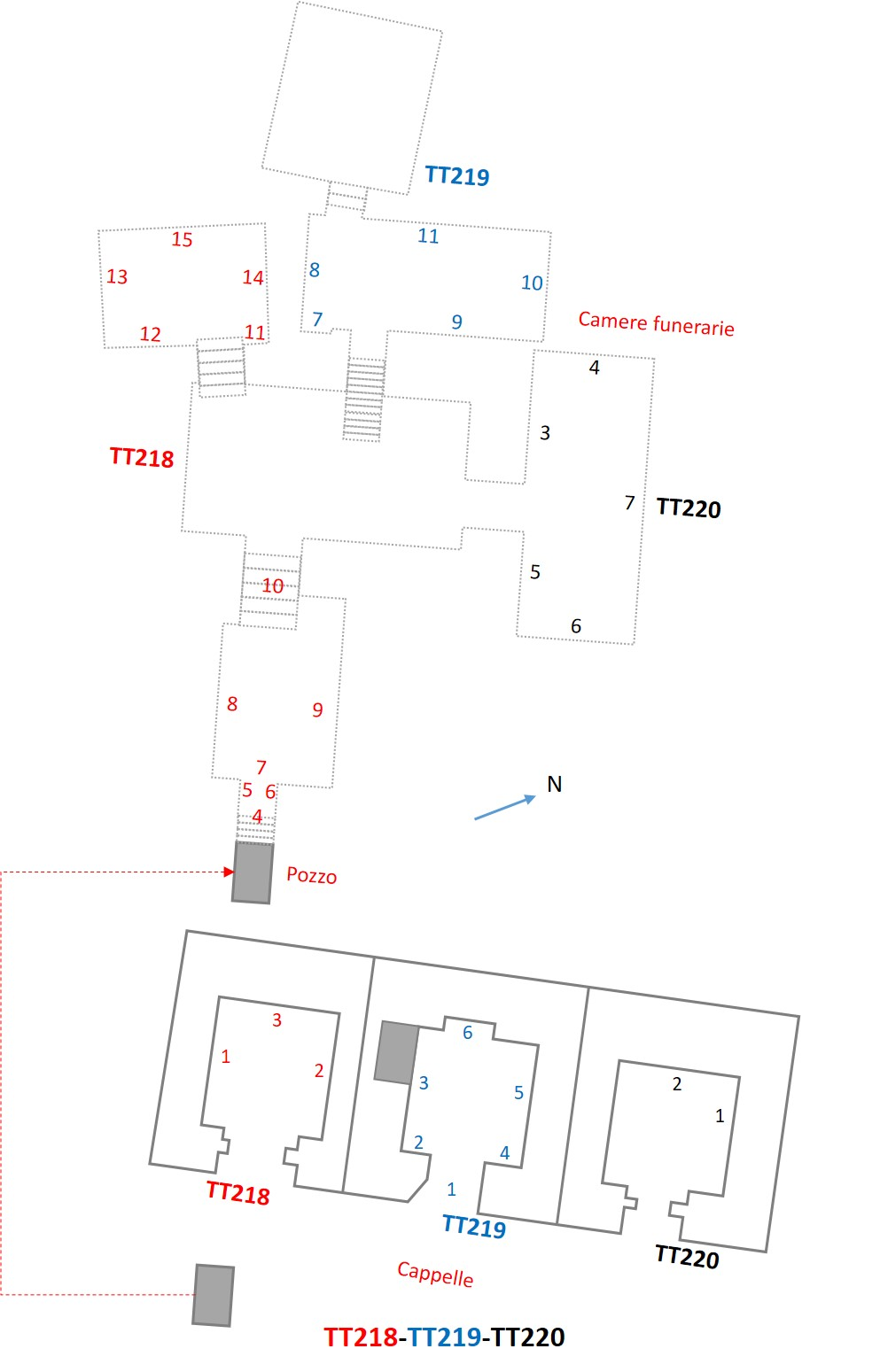
Theban Tombs 218, 219 and 220

As noted, Tomb TT219 is part of a single complex with the adjacent TT218 and TT220 of Nebenmaat's father Amennakht and brother Khaemteri respectively. These are three distinct external chapels which correspond to a single underground funerary apartment which is accessed from a well located in the courtyard in front of the three burials, and specifically a short distance from the entrance to TT218.

=== Upper chapel ===
In the upper chapel (1 blue in the plan) Anubis crouches in front of the Sekhem symbol; on the sides of the access door to the upper chapel, six Servants of the Place of Truth carry spelt in the funeral courtyard which continues on the adjacent wall in which, on three registers (damaged) are reported relatives (?) and procession towards the tomb pyramid. On the other side of the door, the remains of three female deities exists; Nekhtamon (TT335), with his son in offerance to Nebra, brother of the deceased and to his wife. On the adjacent wall, scenes of psychostasis with Thoth and the deceased presented by Anubis to Amenhotep I in a palanquin; assistants in front of the couple and the deceased with his wife offer libations to the gods on a brazier. On the back wall (6), on the left, the deceased and the family; on the right, on three registers, scenes of offertory.

=== Underground funerary apartment ===
From the courtyard in front, a well leads to the underground funerary apartment which still has a common part (numbering in red on the plan) with a first antechamber which leads to a second antechamber which allows access to the three funerary chambers connected to the tombs TT218 (numbering in red), TT219 (numbering in blue) and TT220 (numbering in black).

=== Staircase to the first antechamber ===
In the flight of stairs which gives access to the first antechamber (4 red) remains of the boat of Ra worshipped by the deceased (Amennakht) depicted kneeling on both sides with two Anubis/jackals; on two registers (5 red) the boat of Ra with Hathor and some baboons in adoration; relatives dragging the sarcophagus followed by priests of Ra; (6 red) the deceased with a hymn to Ra.

=== First antechamber ===
In the first antechamber, (7 red) the deceased crouched under a palm tree drinks from a pond while his wife is adoring the gods shown in the scene on the adjacent wall (9) Thoth, Geb, Horus, Nut, Shu, Khepri and the deceased kneeling with his family with a hymn to Ra; not far away, the wife crouched under a palm tree drinks from a pond while the daughter (whose name is not indicated) is in adoration of the deities of the following scene (8 red) Ptah, Thoth, Selkis, Neith, Nut, Nephtys and Isis; the deceased and his wife are also represented, kneeling, with two children and a hymn to Ra.

=== Staircase to the second antechamber ===
On the architrave of the staircase leading to the second antechamber (10 red), Osiris seated with the personification of a Djed pillar in front of the hills, a falcon and Nut who is embracing the solar disk; on the sides the deceased with his son Khaemteri (TT220) kneeling, and the deceased with his son Nebmaat (TT219), all in adoration of Ra.

=== Burial chamber of Amennakht ===
In the center of the second antechamber is the access to the burial chamber of Amennakht, which is accessed via a staircase: (7 blue) on two registers, Anubis/jackal and a son, as a priest, who offers libations to his father and mother. On the adjacent wall (8 blue) winged Isis, the deceased, assisted by his wife Meretseger who plays a flute, offers bunches of flowers and incense to Osiris, Amenhotep I, Hathor (?), Ahmose Nefertari; the deceased is followed by a daughter (name not indicated) and his wife play checkers in the presence of three goddesses, with a ba bird, and adoring baboons. On another wall (9 blue) Wepwautmosi, son of the deceased, with leaves offers libations to his parents. On the shorter wall, a winged Nephthys along with Anubis appears with the instruments for the Opening of the mouth ceremony who takes care of the mummy of Nebenmaat on a catafalque. A little further on, on two superimposed registers, the deceased offering flowers to Satet and Neith, while his son Wepwautmosi and his wife offers a bouquet of flowers to Ra and Sekhmet, priests in offertory to Ptah and Maat and the deceased presented by Anubis to Osiris and the goddess of the West (Meretseger). Scenes of the funerary procession with the transport of the mummy towards the tomb pyramid. A short staircase leads to a second undecorated funerary chamber.

Bernard Bruyère writes that "In front of chapel No. 218, a brick well of 4 m. 07 of depth, serves the vaults of Amen Nakhtou, Neben Mat and Khaemtore, gathered in the same underground system. We will give only a short description without going into the details of the decoration."

== Bibliography ==
- Bernard Bruyère (1927). Rapport sur les Fouilles de Deir el Médineh. Milano: Worcester: Yare Egyptology.
- Sergio Donadoni (1999). Tebe. Milano: Electa.
- Mario Tosi (2005). Dizionario enciclopedico delle divinità dell'antico Egitto - 2 voll.-. Torino: Ananke.
- Alexander Henry Rhind (1862). Thebes, its Tombs and their tenants. Londra: Longman, Green, Longman & Roberts.
- Reeves, Nicholas; De Luca, Araldo (2001). Valley of the Kings. Friedman/Fairfax.
- Reeves, Nicholas; Wilkinson, Richard (2000). The complete Valley of the Kings. New York: Thames & Hudson.
- Gardiner, Alan; Weigall, Arthur E.P. (1913). Topographical Catalogue of the Private Tombs of Thebes. Londra: Bernard Quaritch.
- Donald Redford (2001). The Oxford Encyclopedia of Ancient Egypt. Oxford: Oxford University Press.
- John Gardner Wilkinson (1837). Manners and Customs of the Ancient Egyptians. Londra: John Murray.
- Porter, Bertha; Moss, Rosalind L.B. (1927). Topographical Bibliography of Ancient Egyptian hieroglyphic texts, reliefs, and paintings. Vol. 1. Oxford: Oxford at the Clarendon Press.
- O'Connor, David; Cline, Eric H. (2006). Thutmose III: A New Biography. Ann Arbor (Michigan): University of Michigan Press.
