= TT218 =

Ancient Egyptian tomb

Theban tomb 218
- Burial site of Amennakht
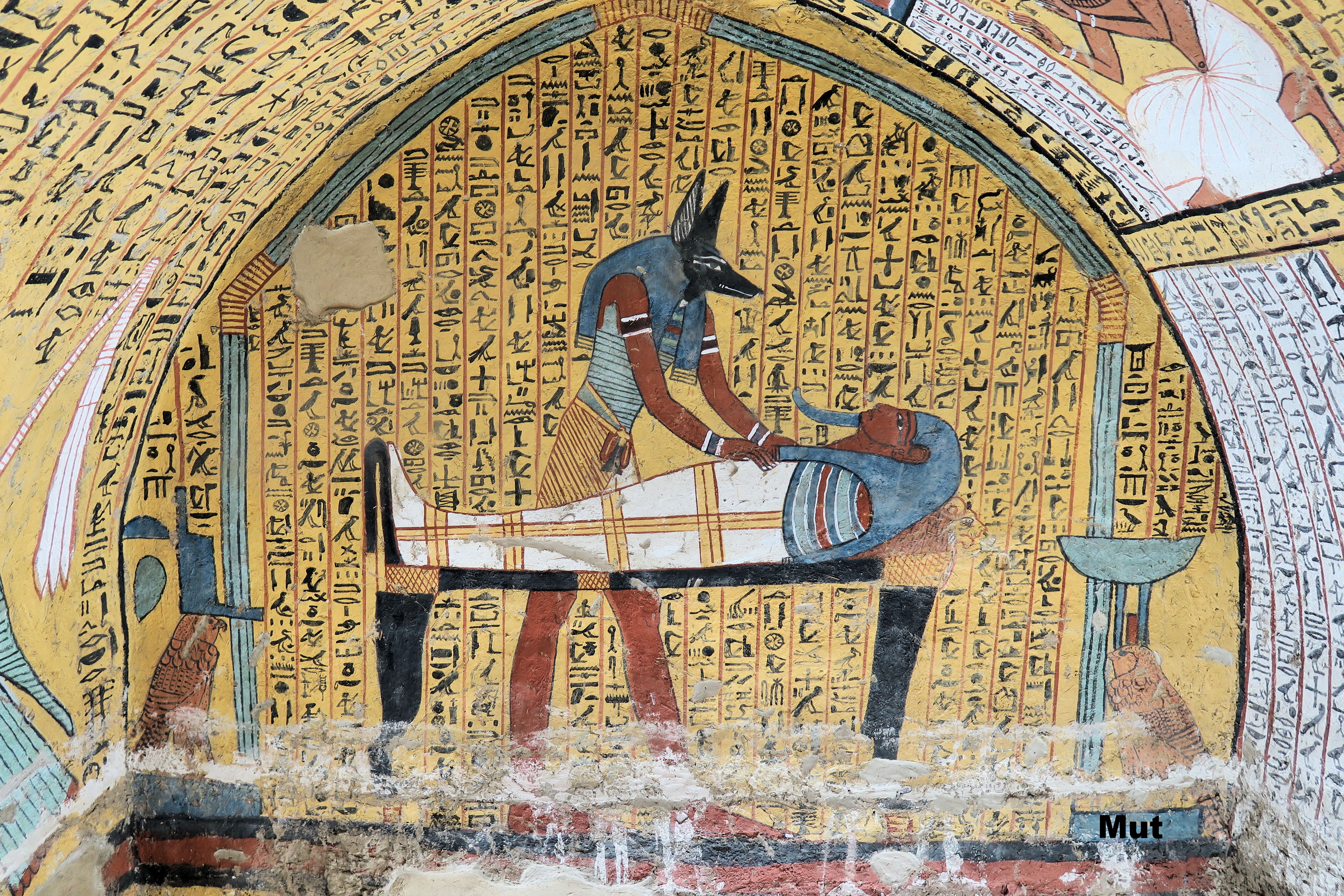
- Anubis attends to Ammennakht's mummy in the afterlife

- Location within Egypt
- Location: Deir el-Medina, Theban Necropolis
- Discovered: 1928
- Excavated by: Bernard Bruyère
- ← Previous; TT217 Next → TT219

TT218 (Theban Tomb 218) is the title which identifies one of the Tombs of the Nobles located in the area of the so-called Theban Necropolis, on the western bank of the Nile in front of the city of Luxor., in Egypt. Intended for the burials of nobles and officials connected to the ruling houses, especially of the New Kingdom, the area was exploited as a necropolis since the Old Kingdom and, subsequently, up to the Saitic period (with the XXVI dynasty) and Ptolemaic period.

== Biography ==
Tomb TT218 belonged to Amennakht, an artisan at Deir el Medina. Amennkaht's father was a certain Nebmaat, se-menw (?) of Amun while his mother was Hetepti. His wife was Iymway while his two sons were Nebenmaat, the owner of TT219 and Khaemteri, the owner of TT220. Tomb TT218 along with the neighbouring family tombs TT219 and TT220 were discovered in 1928 by the French Egyptologist Bernard Bruyère.

== The Tomb ==
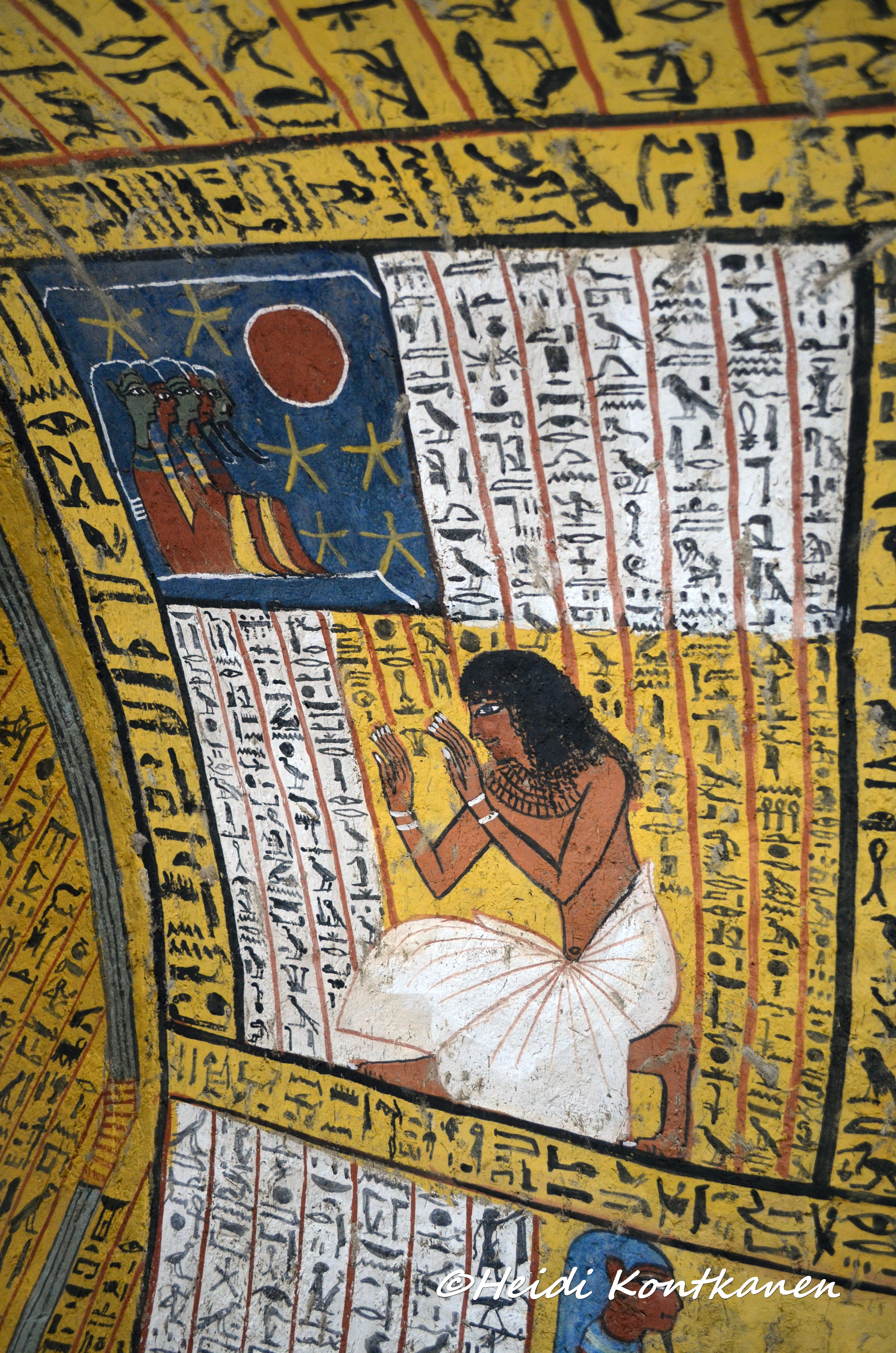
Amennakht shown before the Four sons of Horus in TT218.

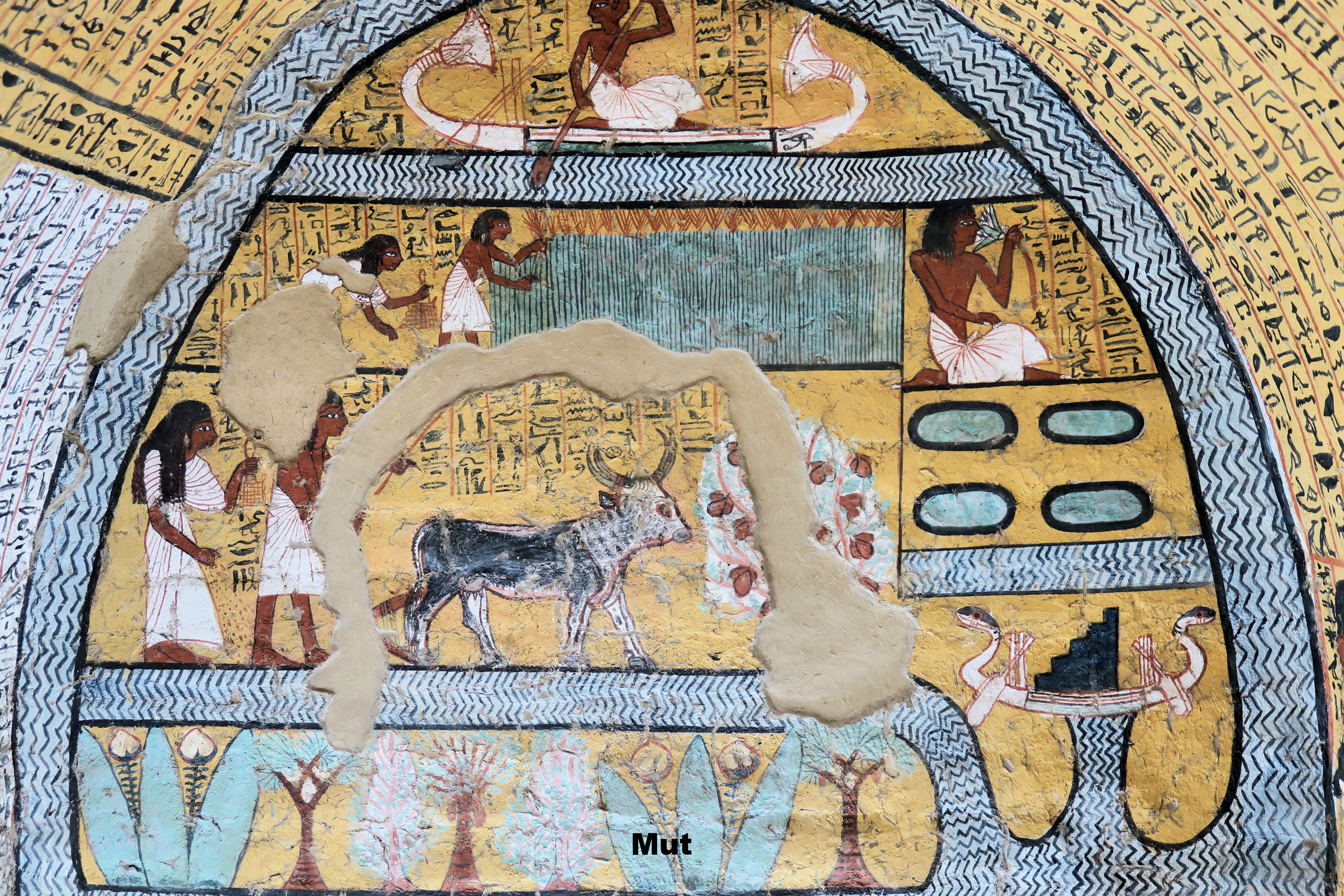
Amennkaht and his wife Iymway are shown harvesting wheat and ploughing the fields with a cow in the afterlife.

Tomb TT218, which also housed Amennakht's wife Iymway, is part of a single complex with the adjacent tombs TT219 and TT220 who were the sons of the owner, Amennakht. These are three distinct external chapels which correspond to a single underground funerary apartment which is accessed from a well located in the courtyard in front of the three burials, and specifically a short distance from the entrance to TT218[N 8]. In the upper chapel (1 red in the plan) a man making an offertory to the deceased and his wife who, in a subsequent scene, offer libations to Ptah and two female deities; scenes of a funerary procession and priests in front of the mummy near the tomb pyramid in the presence of mourning priestesses and other Servants of the Place of Truth. On the opposite wall (2 red) a woman (a daughter?) making an offertory in front of the deceased and his wife; in three scenes, three goddesses with two flying ba birds; scenes of psychostasis and Anubis presenting the deceased to Osiris and other deities. On the back wall (3 red) a stele, damaged on the right, with a mummiform Ptah (left), a woman with a double flute and Sennedjem (TT1), Servant of the Place of Truth.

From the courtyard in front, a well leads to the underground funerary apartment which still has a shared part (the numbering in red continues in the plan) with a first antechamber from which you access a second antechamber which allows access to the three funerary chambers connected to the tombs TT218, TT219 (numbering in blue) and TT220 (numbering in black). In the flight of stairs which gives access to the first antechamber, the remains of the boat of Ra worshipped by the deceased (Amennakht) is depicted kneeling on both sides with two Anubis/jackals; on two registers (5) the boat of Ra with Hathor and some baboons in adoration; relatives pull the sarcophagus followed by priests of Ra; (6) the deceased with a hymn to Ra. In the first antechamber, (7) the deceased crouched under a palm tree drinks from a pond while his wife is in adoration of the gods shown in the scene on the adjacent wall (9) Thoth, Geb, Horus, Nut, Shu, Khepri and the deceased kneeling with his family with a hymn to Ra; not far away, the wife crouched under a palm tree drinks from a pond while her daughter (whose name is not indicated) is in adoration of the deities of the following scene (8) Ptah, Thot, Selkis, Neith, Nut, Nephtys and Isis; the deceased and his wife are also represented, kneeling, with two children and a hymn to Ra. On the architrave of the staircase leading to the second antechamber (10), Osiris is seated with the personification of a Djed pillar in front of the hills, a falcon and Nut who is embracing the solar disk; on the sides, the deceased is shown with his son Khaemteri (in TT220) kneeling, and the deceased is shown with his son Nebmaat (TT219), all in adoration of Ra.

To the left of the second antechamber is the access to the burial chamber of Amennakht: the deceased and his wife with a daughter depicted in the act of adoration; the falcon of the west (12) with texts. Anubis takes care of the mummy on a bed, between the goddesses Isis and Nephthys represented as falcons; on the opposite wall (14) the Fields of Aaru. On the back wall, the gods gathered in council with four texts.

On the opposite side of the burial chamber are scenes of Amennakht and his wife Iymway harvesting wheat in the afterlife and ploughing the fields with a cow.

== Bibliography ==
- Sergio Donadoni (1999). Tebe. Milano: Electa.
- Mario Tosi (2005). Dizionario enciclopedico delle divinità dell'antico Egitto - 2 voll.-. Torino: Ananke.
- Alexander Henry Rhind (1862). Thebes, its Tombs and their tenants. Londra: Longman, Green, Longman & Roberts.
- Reeves, Nicholas; De Luca, Araldo (2001). Valley of the Kings. Friedman/Fairfax.
- Reeves, Nicholas; Wilkinson, Richard (2000). The complete Valley of the Kings. New York: Thames & Hudson.
- Gardiner, Alan; Weigall, Arthur E.P. (1913). Topographical Catalogue of the Private Tombs of Thebes. Londra: Bernard Quaritch.
- Donald Redford (2001). The Oxford Encyclopedia of Ancient Egypt. Oxford: Oxford University Press.
- John Gardner Wilkinson (1837). Manners and Customs of the Ancient Egyptians. Londra: John Murray.
- Porter, Bertha; Moss, Rosalind L.B. (1927). Topographical Bibliography of Ancient Egyptian hieroglyphic texts, reliefs, and paintings. Vol. 1. Oxford: Oxford at the Clarendon Press.
- O'Connor, David; Cline, Eric H. (2006). Thutmose III: A New Biography. Ann Arbor (Michigan): University of Michigan Press.
- William J. Murnane (1995). Texts from the Amarna Period in Egypt. New York: Society of Biblical Literature.
- Lyla Pinch Brock (2001). The Tomb of Userhat in The Tombs and the Funerary Temples of Thebes West, pp. 414-417. il Cairo: American University in Cairo Press.
- Norman de Garis Davies (1927). Two Ramesside Tombs at Thebes, pp. 3-30. New York.
- Norman de Garis Davies (1917). The Tomb of Nakht at Thebes. New York: Metropolitan Museum of Art.
- Jiro Kondo (1927). The Re-use of the Private Tombs on the Western Bank of Thebes and Its Chronological Problem: The Cases of the Tomb of Hnsw (no. 31) and the Tomb of Wsr-h3t (no. 51), in Orient n.ro 32, pp. 50-68.
- Kent R. Weeks (2005). The Treasures of Luxor and the Valley of the Kings, pp. 478-483. il Cairo: American University in Cairo Press.
