= Kathrin Gabler =

German Egyptologist

Kathrin Gabler (born 1984 in Ingolstadt) is a German Egyptologist. She is the current professor of Egyptology at the University of Mainz, a German U15 research university, and a specialist on Deir el-Medina prosopography, Hieratic script, and Egyptian archaeology.

== Education and academic career ==
Kathrin Gabler received her Magister Artium degree at LMU Munich in 2010. She obtained her doctoral degree at LMU Munich in 2016 after a stay at Leiden University. After that, she taught Egyptology at LMU Munich, the University of Basel, the Humboldt University of Berlin, and the University of Copenhagen. From 2023 to 2024, she worked at the Cairo Division of the German Archaeological Institute. In July 2024, Gabler assumed the full professorship at the University of Mainz, succeeding Ursula Verhoeven-van Elsbergen as the chair of Egyptology.

Gabler is a founding member and was an original member of the governing board of the German Association of Egyptology (Verband der Ägyptologie).

== Research ==
Kathrin Gabler has participated in diverse field projects in Egypt, including the British Museum epigraphic and conservation survey at Elkab and Hagr Edfu, the German excavations at the Deir el-Bakhit Coptic monastery. Since 2024, she works at the Mortuary Temple of Amenhotep III in Kom el-Hettân. As of 2024, Gabler manages the German House in Luxor within the framework of a joint project between the German Archaeological Institute and the University of Mainz. Since 2020, Gabler is the director of exploration and restoration works at the Theban tomb TT217 as part of an Institut Français d'Archéologie Orientale mission.

From 2019 to 2023, Gabler participated in the Crossing Boundaries project (a cooperation between the University of Basel and the University of Liège as well as Museo Egizio), which processed Deir el-Medina papyri in the Museo Egizio in Turin.

In her monograph, based on PhD dissertation, Gabler examined the service personnel at Deir el-Medina, tracing the data on individual occupations and establishing the patterns of social mobility within this group. The lists of documents for the service personnel compiled in the course of the work are available in open access as part of the Deir el-Medina database. According to Anne Austin, Gabler's book significantly advances the understanding of service professionals at Deir el-Medina. Hanane Gaber maintains that Gabler's book fills a gap in the knowledge of Deir el-Medina personnel. Gabler further published over 20 research papers, editing new textual material and studying different aspects of life at Deir el-Medina and beyond.

== Selected publications ==
- Gabler, Kathrin (2018). Who's who around Deir el-Medina. Untersuchungen zur Organisation, Prosopographie und Entwicklung des Versorgungspersonals für die Arbeitersiedlung und das Tal der Könige. Egyptologische Uitgaven. Vol. 31. Peeters. ISBN 978-90-6258-231-0.
- Gabler, Kathrin (2018). "Can I stay or must I go? Relations between the Deir el-Medina community and their service personnel". In Dorn, Andreas; Polis, Stéphane (eds.). Outside the Box. Selected papers from the conference "Deir el-Medina and the Theban Necropolis in Contact". Presses Universitaires de Liège. pp. 157–189. ISBN 978-2-87562-166-5.
- Gabler, Kathrin (2018). "Methods of Identification Among the Deir el-Medina Workmen and their Service Personnel: The Use of Names, Titles, Patronyms and Identity Marks in Administrative Texts from Deir el-Medina". In Haring, B. J. J.; van der Moezel, K. V. J.; Soliman, D. M. (eds.). Decoding Signs of Identity. Egyptian Workmen's Marks in Archaeological, Historical, Comparative and Theoretical Perspective. Peeters. pp. 191–218. ISBN 9789042937055.
- Gabler, Kathrin; Salmas, Anne-Claire (2022). ""Make yourself at home": some "house biographies" from Deir el-Medina, with a special focus on the domestic (and funerary) spaces of Sennedjem's family". In Töpfer, Susanne; Del Vesco, Paolo; Poole, Federico (eds.). Deir el-Medina: through the kaleidoscope. Proceedings of the international workshop, Turin 8th-10th October 2018. Museo Egizio. pp. 75–141. ISBN 9788857018300.
- Gabler, Kathrin (2017). "Stele Turin CGT 50057 (= Cat. 1514) im ikonografischen und prosopografischen Kontext Deir el-Medines: nb.t-pr Mw.t(-m-wjꜣ) (vi) im Spannungsfeld der Mächte der Taweret und des Seth?". Rivista del Museo Egizio. 1. doi:10.29353/rime.2017.892.
- Demarée, Rob; Gabler, Kathrin; Polis, Stéphane (2022). "A family affair in the community of Deir el-Medina: gossip girls in two 19th dynasty letters". In Gülden, Svenja A.; Konrad, Tobias; Verhoeven, Ursula (eds.). Ägyptologische "Binsen"-Weisheiten IV: Hieratisch des Neuen Reiches: Akteure, Formen und Funktionen. Akten der internationalen Tagung in der Akademie der Wissenschaften und der Literatur, Mainz im Dezember 2019. Stuttgart: Steiner. pp. 43–126. ISBN 9783515133333.

Besides, Gabler co-edited five volumes of proceedings of the Münchner and Berliner Arbeitskreis "Junge Ägyptologie" (Young Egyptology), a Festschrift for Susanne Bickel, as well as an Open-Access book series New Kingdom Hieratic Collections From Around the World.
