= Will of Naunakhte =

Ancient Egyptian legal document

The Will of Naunakhte (also referred to as Naunakht) is a papyrus found at the workmen's village of Deir el-Medina that dates to the 20th Dynasty during the reign of Ramesses V. Discovered by the French Institute in 1928, the will outlines the division of assets by an Egyptian mother among her children.

== The papyrus ==
The Will of Naunakhte papyrus was originally separated into two rolls. Later on, it was discovered that the rolls were cut from the same papyrus; it was decided then to physically rejoin them. The papyrus measures 43 cm (17 in) in height and 192 cm (76 in) in length.

Handwriting changes provide evidence that the will was written by two different scribes. It is believed that two scribes wrote different sections.

The papyrus is now located at the Ashmolean Museum at Oxford University and can be found under P.Ashmolean 1945.97.

== Lady Naunakhte ==
The Lady Naunakhte held the title of citizen. This was indicative of all free women in the 20th Dynasty who were not servants or slaves.

She was married twice, first to the scribe Kenhikhopshef and then to the workman Khaemnun. The eight children mentioned in the will belonged to Khaemnun.

== Contents of the will ==
The Will of Naunakhte lays out her wishes on the inheritance of her eight children.

The will first states the date of its declaration and the names of witnesses who were present when it was transcribed.

The will then states which children would receive Naunakhte's property and which children got nothing. She disinherited three children and bestowed her property on the remaining five. Her son, Kenhikhopshef, received a special reward of a bronze washing bowl. Naunakhte specifically stated that the disinherited children were still eligible to receive property from their father, Khaemnun.

== Significance of will ==
The will of Naunakhte offers an insight into the judicial proceedings that affected everyday Egyptians, particularly those of the workmen and their families at Deir el-Medina. The will also demonstrates the growing use of written records for non-royal Egyptians.

The will also illuminates the place that women held within Egyptian society. Under the 20th dynasty of Egypt, women had the same legal property ownership rights as men. Though women tended to inherit little from their families, they controlled their inheritance, not their husbands. The will also gives insight into the practices of caring for elder parents and the social rules that governed their support.

== List of children ==
- Maaynakhtef (male)
- Kenhikhopshef (male)
- Amennakht (male)
- Wosnakhte (female)
- Manenakhte (female)
- Neferhot[e]p (male)
- Henshene (female)
- Khanub (female)

According to the papyrus, of the children of Lady Naunakhte and her second husband, Khaemnun, the first five were considered the “good” children who continued to support and provide care to Naunakhte in her old age and therefore received a portion of her property. In contrast, Neferhot[e]p, Henshene, and Khanub failed to support Naunakhte sufficiently and therefore were disowned and left with nothing.

== Secondary scholarship ==
First studied and analyzed by Jaroslav Černý, the will of Naunakhte is often cited in regards to women in Egypt, judicial literature, and life within the workmen's village of Deir el-Medina. For example, A.G. McDowell cites the will of Naunakhte as an example of the power that women held in regards to controlling their own property. Also Ben Haring utilizes the will of Naunakhte in order to describe the growing use of papyri to record both private and judicial matters.
