= Bernard Bruyère =

French Egyptologist (1879–1971)

- Born: 10 November 1879; Besançon, Doubs, France
- Died: 4 December 1971 (aged 92); Chatou, Yvelines, France

Bernard Bruyère (10 November 1879 – 4 December 1971) was a French Egyptologist. He was one of the discoverers of the Tomb of Tutankhamun.

== Biography ==
Born in Besançon, Bruyère devoted a large part of his career to archaeological excavations of Deir el-Medina and the scientific publication of his findings at the site. Deir el-Medina was a village of artisans who worked on digging and decorating the tombs of the Valley of the Kings. Bruyère excavated the village and its surrounding area from 1922 to 1940 and from 1945 to 1951, where he undertook a systematic and rational exploration of the archaeological zone. The site has been thoroughly excavated and studied by Bernard Bruyère, who published the results of his work every year.

In 1922, Bernard Bruyère discovered the tomb TT290 in the necropolis of Deir el-Medina. This tomb had been stripped of almost everything in ancient times. The only remaining funeral equipment, discovered in the tomb, were some fragments of stelae and fragments of a wooden coffin belonging to Irunefer, a servant in the Place of Truth.

One morning in October 1922, British archaeologist and Egyptologist Howard Carter visited the site to express his despair to his colleague, Bruyère: Lord Carnarvon, Carter's patron, had ended their collaboration, giving Carter a deadline to find something of value on the expedition they had just begun. Bruyère, who followed the excavations of the English with interest, suggested that they explore a spot they had not yet prospected: the foot of the entrance to Ramesses VI's tomb. There, they discovered the Tomb of Tutankhamun.

During the excavation campaign of 1927, Bernard Bruyère excavated tomb TT299, the second tomb of Inerkhau, which he had already found in 1922–23 according to the reports of Karl Richard Lepsius. He then faced major technical problems, including the falling of a twenty-ton rock that threatened to destroy what remained of the underlying structures.

On 7 February 1928, Bruyère discovered the untouched grave of Sennefer. The discovery was reconstructed in the exhibition "The artists of Pharaoh" at the Louvre in 2002. The tomb of the lady Madja, whose coffin was found in his tomb, was also exhibited at the Louvre in this exhibit (room 14). Bruyère also discovered the family tombs of Amennakht and his two sons--TT218, TT219 and TT220 in 1928.

From 1949 to 1951, Bruyère completed the excavation of the large well more than 50 metres (160 ft) deep and 35 metres (115 ft) wide at the opening. The inhabitants of the village used this giant hole for disposal of unwanted materials, after a failed attempt to use it as a water source. Bruyère raised 6,000 cubic metres (210,000 cu ft) of debris without mechanical assistance, and found more than 5000 ostraca in this deposit. He died in Chatou in 1971, aged 92.

== Notebooks ==
The IFAO has decided to gradually publish Bernard Bruyère's excavation notebooks online, which provide a basic source of information on Deir el-Medina. These are the original manuscript pages that have been scanned.
