= Mastaba of Seshemnefer =

Early Sixth Dynasty tomb in Giza Necropolis, Egypt

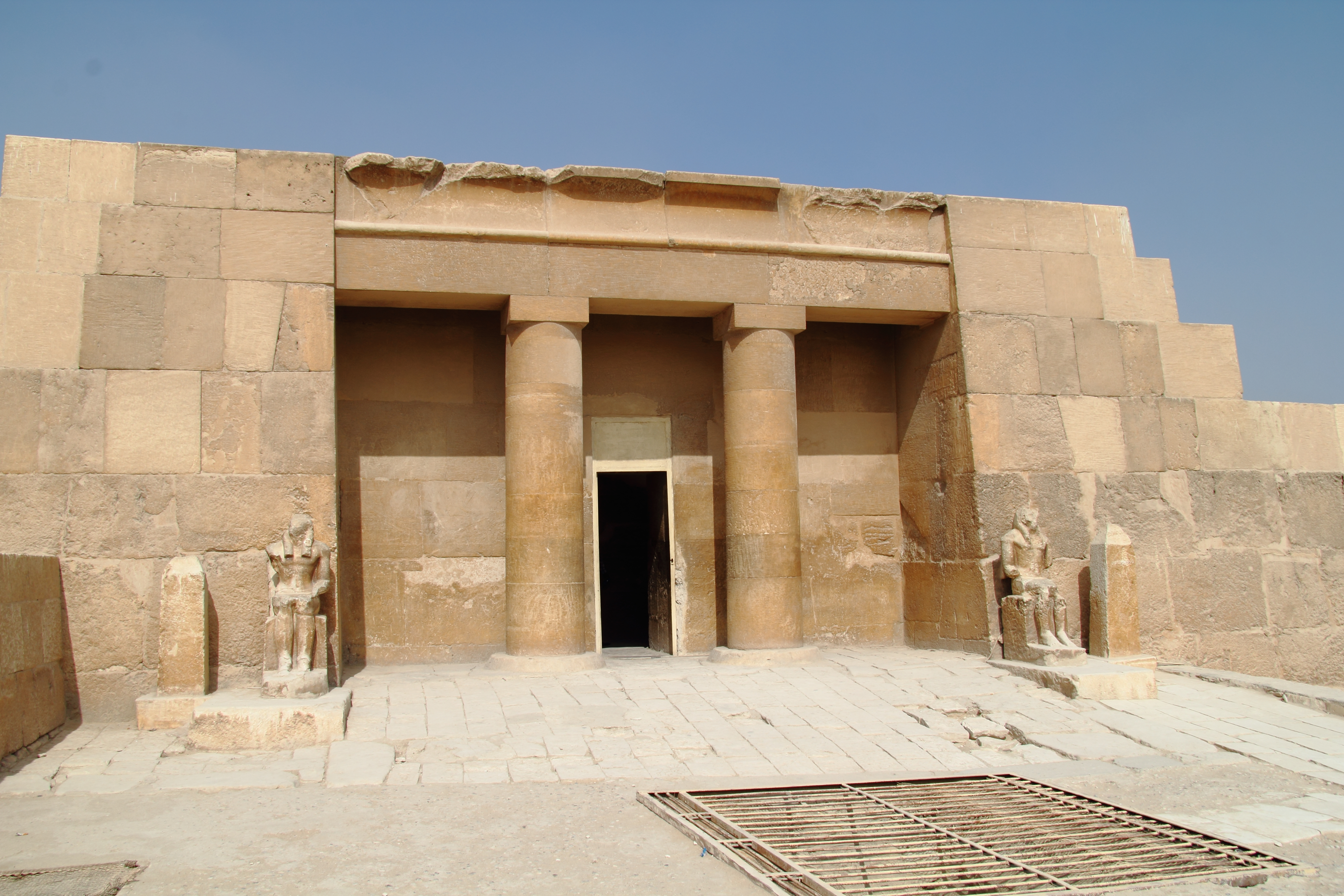
- The facade of the mastaba of Seshemnefer IV; Burial site of Seshemnefer
- Interactive map of Mastaba of Seshemnefer
- Type: Mastaba
- Location: Giza, Egypt

History
- Built: c. 2340 BC

Site notes
- Material: Limestone

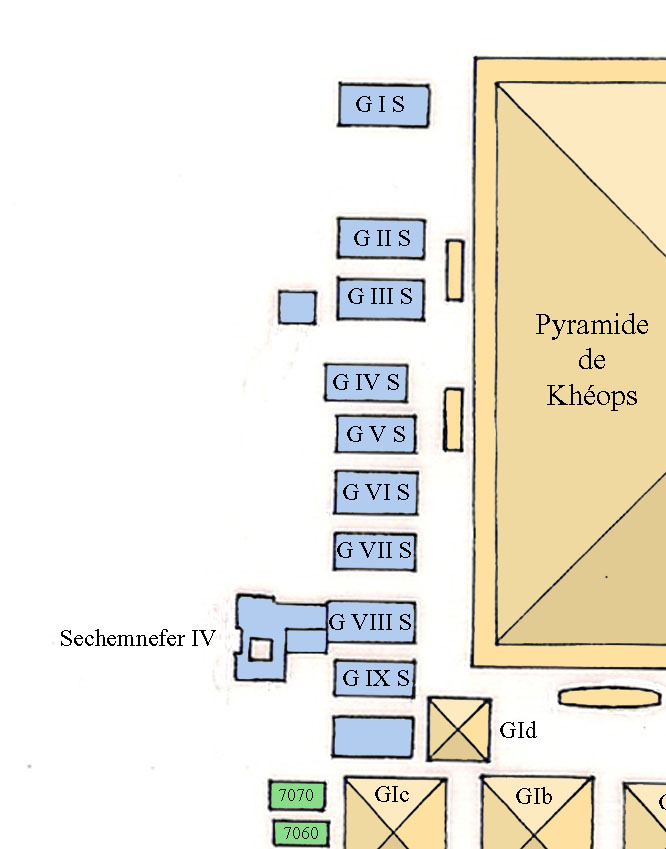
Location of the Mastaba of Seshemnefer at Giza

The Mastaba of Seshemnefer IV is a mastaba tomb in Cemetery GIS of the Giza Necropolis in Egypt. It dates from the early Sixth Dynasty (c. 2340 BC), and was built for the official Seshemnefer IV (LG 53). Five reliefs from the mastaba of Seshemnefer IV are on display in the Egyptian collection of the Roemer- und Pelizaeus-Museum Hildesheim.

== Discovery ==
Already in the period between 1842 and 1845, the first excavation of the tomb was carried out by members of the Prussian Expedition under the leadership of Karl Lepsius. At this time, the reliefs were in a far better state of preservation. While Lepsius took pieces of the decoration of the north and east walls with him to the Egyptian Museum of Berlin (Inv.# 1128 and 1129), the blocks of the west wall remained in situ until the excavations of Hermann Junker. The tomb was completely uncovered during Junker's excavations, which took place in 1928 or 1929. Five relief fragments were sent to the Egyptian collection of the Roemer- und Pelizaeus-Museum Hildesheim.

== Tomb owner ==
Seshemnefer IV (Sšm-nfr) was Head of the Royal Harem, which means he was the manager of the area of the palace where the women and children of the royal family lived. Additionally, a list of his ranks and honorific titles survives which indicates that he was an important man at court, who was trusted by his king. The surviving reliefs from the mastaba give an insight into daily life in his time, including agriculture, cattle breeding, bird hunting, grain storage, but also clothing, offering rituals and, to some degree, colloquial language.

== Reliefs at Hildesheim ==
=== Playing Goats (Inv. No. 3192) ===
The damaged relief fragment can no longer be assigned to a specific wall of the mastaba. In the upper register, it shows a he-goat and a jumping kid; in the lower register, a he-goat jumping over another goat. Behind it is another jumping kid.

=== Bird hunt scene (Inv. No. 3193) ===
This fragment cannot be clearly attributed to a specific wall of the mastaba either. It shows the netting and the division of the captured birds between two people. Two men are shown in a bird hunting scene. The left is identified as the "leader of the bird hunt". The inscription in front of the second man, which only survives in fragments, says "causing the net to be tightened." The man gives a sign that the net hanging to his right should be tightened to capture birds which have flown into it. The two birds on the right are caught in the net. In the upper portion of the image, three men empty a net. The man on the right takes the birds out and hands them to the man standing in front of him, who gives them to a third man who is standing on a cage - only his hands are now preserved. In the cage are several other birds which have already been captured.

=== Great harvest scene (Inv. No. 3191) ===
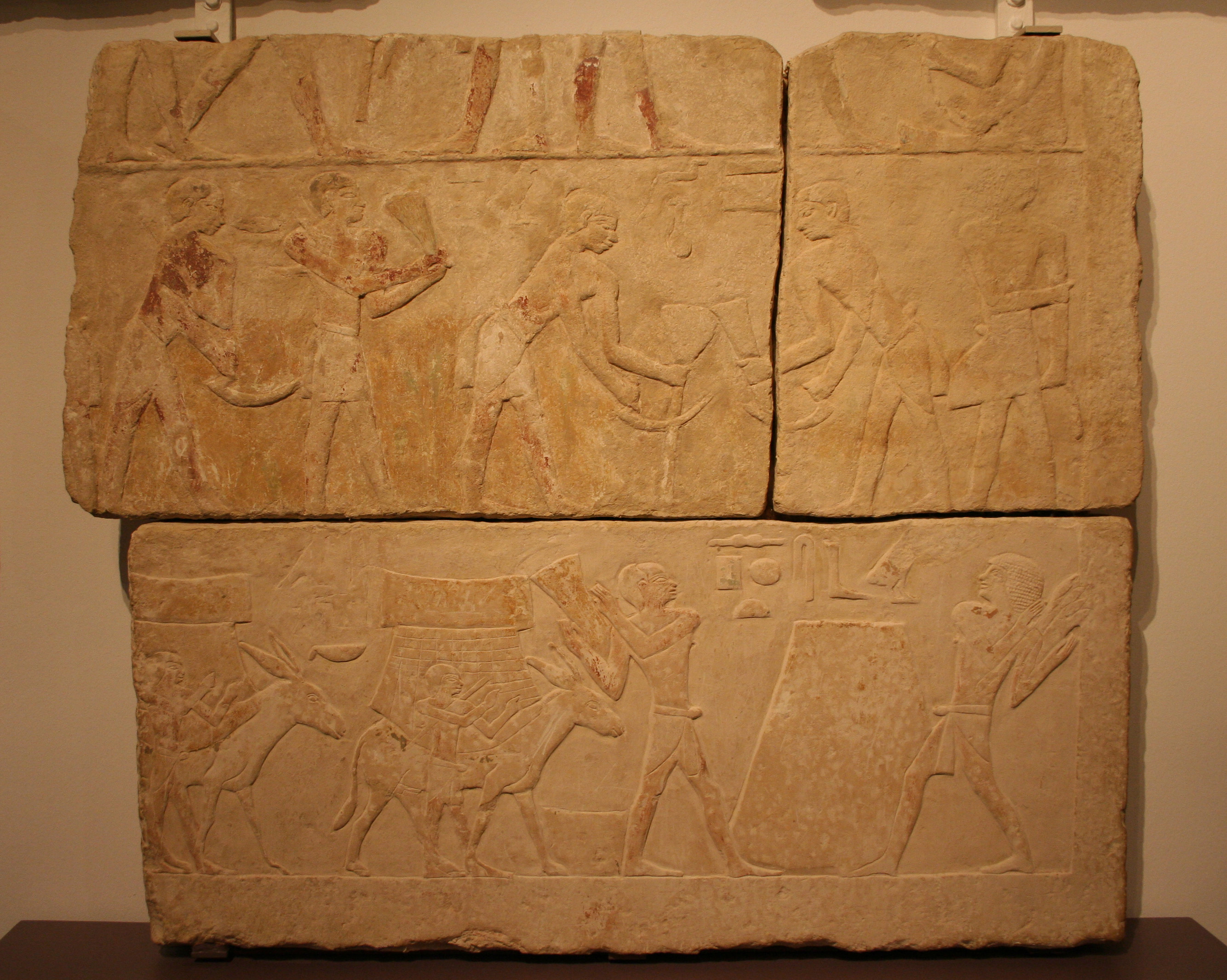
The three preserved fragments of the harvest scene

Scenes of various kinds of agriculture, like this broken relief with two and a half preserved registers of a harvest scene, are a regular part of the decoration of large tombs. The three preserved fragments were removed from the right part of the west wall. The left part of the wall is lost, but contained a depiction of the owner of the tomb, whose legs and kilt were still preserved when the tomb was first excavated. This allows the scene to be contextualised as a whole: Seshemnefer IV stood at left, facing right; in front of him, flax and cereals are being harvested. The harvesting of the cereals with hand sickles is preserved in the surviving fragments, including an overseer standing at right. Below, the transport of the cereal to the granary is shown. The grain is kept in large sacks which are carried by donkeys. Finally, at right, two workers stack the grain in the granary, as a caption explains. The donkey driver hold the sacks in place with his hands. In the upper register, the agricultural scenes are not preserved. On the other wall of the same room, further work was depicted: the threshing of the grain with the help of the donkeys and the winnowing. All these images guaranteed the tomb owner a supply of the necessities of live after his death. They would protect him from hunger and thirst for all eternity. The relief is made of limestone and is 84.5 cm high, 1.005 meters wide and 10.5 cm deep.

=== Slaughter of a steer (Inv. No. 3194) ===
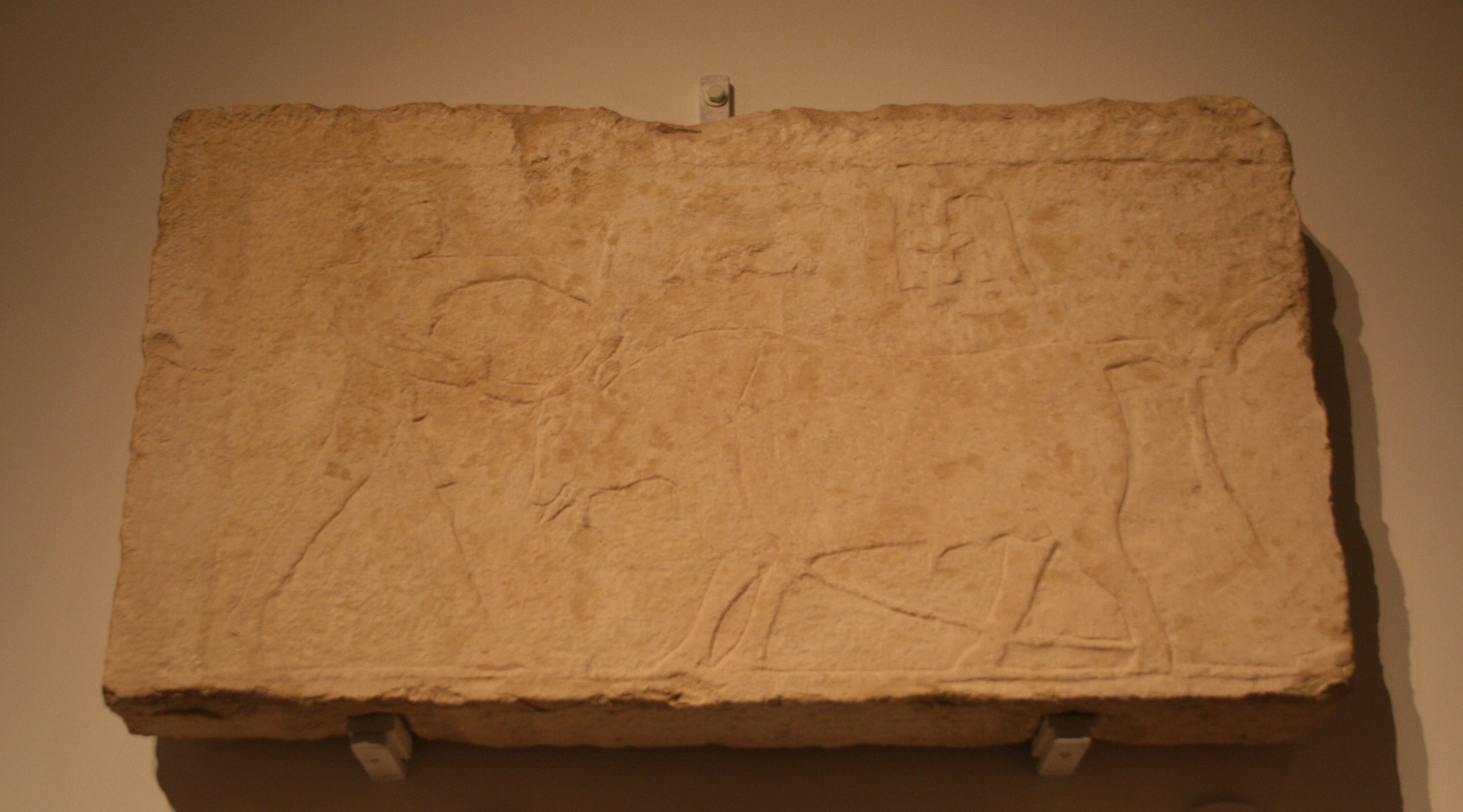
The slaughter of the steer

This relief block belonged to the highest of the three bands of imagery of the right soffit of passage between two rooms. It depicts the binding and slaughter of a steer. A man holds the steer by the horns while a second man pulls the forelegs out from under it with a rope and simultaneously kicks the back leg with his foot in order to make the animal fall. The inscription says that it is a young offering to the tomb owner.

=== Offering in front of the statue of Seshemnefer IV (Inv. No. 3190) ===
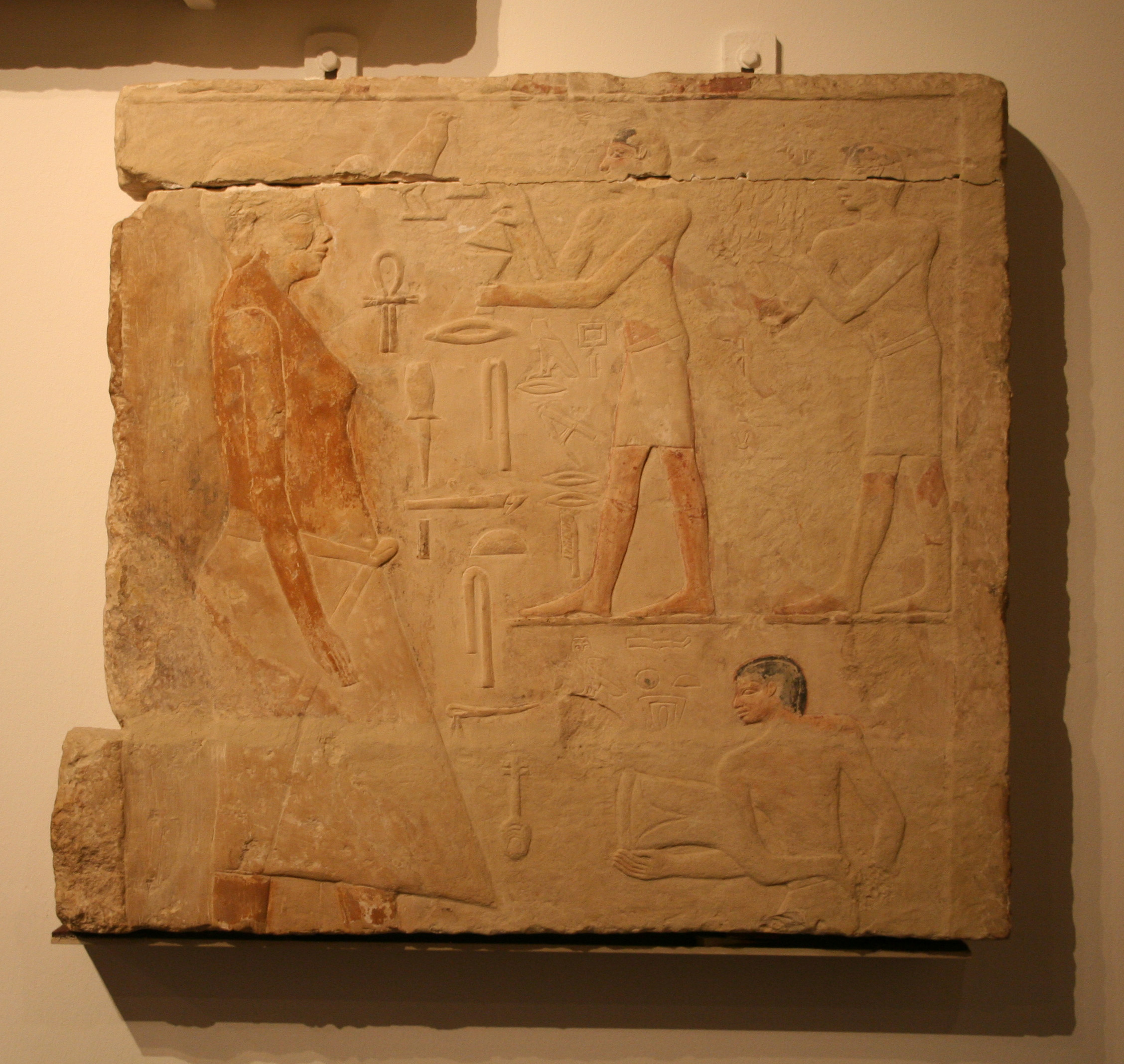
Offering to the statue of Seshemnefer IV

In the foreground of this scene of an offering of incense and meat, is the statue of the tomb owner, Seshemnefer IV, shown as a stout man standing up straight. That it is a statue is indicated by the depiction of the shoulders and arms in profile - otherwise, in Egyptian depictions of people, the shoulders were shown in a frontal view and the head in profile. It is labeled as a "statue of the Sole friend, Seshemnefer" (twt-r-ankh smr-watj sSm-nfr). The statue stands facing three servants (funerary priests) who are shown at a smaller scale. In the upper part of the relief, the steward Mer-r-ri (jmj-rA pr mrrj) acts as a funerary priest, lifting the lid of the incense vessel, so that the scent of the incense can reach the nose of the statue. Behind him stands a second servant. Because of severe damage to the relief surface, the papyrus which he holds in his hand to recite from is no longer visible. Underneath, another servant carries a cow's leg and probably formed part of another slaughtering scene. All the individuals shown wear a short kilt tied in place under the navel. With the help of his statue, which was magically brought to life by offerings and rituals, Seshemnefer IV would be made to live again. The statue served as a substitute body for eternity. The relief fragment is made of limestone, is 70.3 cm high, 78.3 cm wide and 10 cm deep.

== Bibliography ==
- Hermann Junker. Gîza 11. Der Friedhof südlich der Cheopspyramide. Ostteil (= Akademie der Wissenschaften in Wien Philosophisch-historische Klasse Denkschriften. 74, Abhandlung 2). Rohrer, Wien 1953, pp. 92–96, 100–119, 126–131, 137–241 (Digitised).
- Bertha Porter, Rosalind L. B. Moss. Topographical Bibliography of Ancient Egyptian Hieroglyphic Texts, Reliefs, and Paintings. Vol. 3: Memphis. Part 1: Abû Rawâsh to Abûsîr, revised and augmented by Jaromír Málek. 2nd edition, Clarendon Press, Oxford 1974, S. 223–226 (Digitised).
- Hans Kayser. Die Ägyptischen Altertümer im Roemer-Pelizaeus Museum in Hildesheim. Roemer-Pelizaeus-Museum, Hildesheim 1973.
- Arne Eggebrecht, Bettina Schmitz, Matthias Seidel. Das Alte Reich. Ägypten im Zeitalter der Pyramiden. von Zabern, Mainz 1986, ISBN 978-3-8053-0936-3.
- Katja Lembke, Martin von Falck, Bettina Schmitz. Das Alte Ägypten in Hildesheim. Vol. 1: Das Alte Reich. Ägypten von den Anfängen zur Hochkultur. von Zabern, Mainz 2009, ISBN 978-3-8053-4073-1.
