= Mastaba =

Type of tomb in ancient Egypt

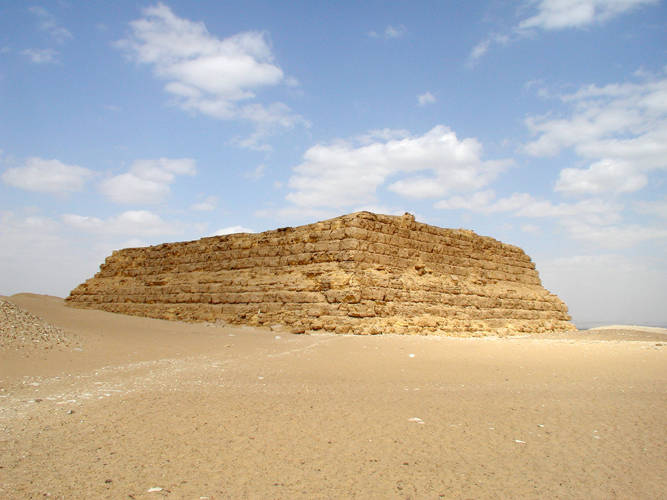
Example of a mastaba, the Mastabat al-Fir'aun of Shepseskaf

A mastaba (/ˈmæstəbə/ MASS-tə-bə, /ˈmɑːstɑːbɑː/ MAHSS-tah-bah or /mɑːˈstɑːbɑː/ mahss-TAH-bah; also mastabah or mastabat) is a type of ancient Egyptian tomb in the form of a flat-roofed, rectangular structure with inward sloping sides, constructed out of mudbricks or limestone. These edifices marked the burial sites of many eminent Egyptians during Egypt's Early Dynastic Period and Old Kingdom. Non-royal use of mastabas continued for over a thousand years.

pr R11
Mastaba
(pr.ḏd)
in hieroglyphs
Era: Old Kingdom
(2686–2181 BC)

The word mastaba is from the Arabic word for "bench". The Ancient Egyptian name was pr-ḏd (Old Egyptian pronunciation [ˈpaːɾuw cʼaːtʼ], transliteration per-djed), meaning "house of stability", "house of eternity", or "eternal house".

== History ==
Egyptian archaeologist, Fekri Hassan, (2002) indicated that the construction of monumental megalithic tombs and tumuli in the Saharan region of Niger and the Eastern Sahara which developed, as early as 4700 BCE, may have served as antecedents for the mastabas and pyramids of ancient Egypt. Hassan also identified the presence of several tumuli sites in predynastic Egypt regions such as Naqadah and Helwan. Africana scholar Salim Faraji (2022) has situated the origin of the Ancient Egyptian pyramids and Meroitic Kush pyramids in an earlier architectural "Sudanic-Sahelian" tradition of monarch tumuli structural sites, which are defined as "earthen pyramids" or "proto-pyramids".

The afterlife was centralized in the religion of ancient Egyptians. Their architecture reflects this, most prominently by the enormous amounts of time and labor involved in building tombs. Ancient Egyptians believed that the needs from the world of the living would be continued in the afterlife; it was therefore necessary to build tombs that would fulfill them, and be sturdy enough to last for an eternity. These needs would also have to be attended to by the living.

Starting in the Predynastic era (before 3100 BCE) and continuing into later dynasties, the ancient Egyptians developed increasingly complex and effective methods for preserving and protecting the bodies of the dead. They first buried their dead in pit graves dug from the sand with the body placed on a mat, usually along with some items believed to help them in the afterlife. The first tomb structure the Egyptians developed was the mastaba, composed of earthen bricks made from soil along the Nile. It provided better protection from scavenging animals and grave robbers. The origins of the mastaba can be seen in Tarkhan, where tombs would be split into two distinct portions. One side would contain a body, oriented in a north-south position, and the other would be open for the living to deliver offerings. As the remains were not in contact with the dry desert sand, natural mummification could not take place; therefore the Egyptians devised a system of artificial mummification. Until at least the Old Period or First Intermediate Period, only high officials and royalty were buried in these mastabas.

== Structure ==
Structure of a mastaba

The term mastaba comes from the Arabic word for "a bench of mud". When seen from a distance, a flat-topped mastaba does resemble a bench. Historians speculate that the Egyptians may have borrowed architectural ideas from Mesopotamia, since at the time they were both building similar structures.

The above-ground structure of a mastaba is rectangular in shape with inward-sloping sides and a flat roof. The exterior building materials were initially bricks made of the sun-dried mud readily available from the Nile River. Even after more durable materials such as stone came into use, the majority were built from mudbricks. Monumental mastabas, such as those at Saqqara, were often constructed out of limestone. Mastabas were often about four times as long as they were wide, and many rose to at least 10 metres (30 ft) in height. They were oriented north–south, which the Egyptians believed was essential for access to the afterlife. The roofs of the mastabas were of slatted wood or slabs of limestone, with skylights illuminating the tomb. The above-ground structure had space for a small offering chapel equipped with a false door. Priests and family members brought food and other offerings for the soul, or ba, of the deceased, which had to be maintained in order to continue to exist in the afterlife. The construction of mastabas was standardized, with several treatments being common for masonry.

Mastabas were highly decorated, both with paintings on the walls and ceilings, and carvings of organic elements such as palm trees out of limestone. Due to the spiritual significance of the color, it was preferable to construct mastabas from white limestone. If this was not available, the yellow limestone or mudbrick of the tomb would be whitewashed and plastered. Mastabas for royalty were especially extravagant on the exterior, meant to resemble a palace.

== Interior ==
Reconstructed tomb chapel with painted walls in the Grand Egyptian Museum

A mastaba was essentially meant to provide the ba with a house in the afterlife, and they were laid out accordingly. Some would be used to house families, rather than individuals, with several burial shafts acting as "rooms". The burial chambers were cut deep, into the bedrock, and were lined with wood. A second hidden chamber called a serdab (سرداب), from the Persian word for "cellar", was used to store anything that may have been considered essential for the comfort of the deceased in the afterlife, such as beer, grain, clothes and precious items. The mastaba housed a statue of the deceased that was hidden within the masonry for its protection. High up the walls of the serdab were small openings that would allow the ba to leave and return to the body (represented by the statue); Ancient Egyptians believed the ba had to return to its body or it would die. These openings "were not meant for viewing the statue but rather for allowing the fragrance of burning incense, and possibly the spells spoken in rituals, to reach the statue". The statues were nearly always oriented in one direction, facing the opening. The serdab could also feature inscriptions, such as the testament and mortuary cult of the owner. More elaborate mastabas would feature open courtyards, which would be used to house more statues and allow the dead to perform rites. Over time, the courtyards grew into magnificent columned halls, which served the same purposes. These halls would typically be the largest room in the mastaba, and they could be used for sacrifices of livestock. Larger mastabas also included a network of storerooms, which the presiding phyle would use to maintain the mortuary cult of the mastaba's owner. Generally, there would be five of these storerooms, used by the living to store equipment needed for performing rites; unlike the serdab, they were not meant to be used by the deceased. These lacked any form of decoration, again distinguishing their function from that of the rest of the tomb. Due to the great expense of adding a complex of storerooms, these were only constructed in the largest of mastabas, for the royal family and viziers.

== Architectural evolution ==
Map of the Giza Plateau, showing the mastabas constructed within the complex

The mastaba was the standard type of tomb in pre-dynastic and early dynastic Egypt for both the pharaoh and the social elite. The ancient city of Abydos was the location chosen for many of the cenotaphs. The royal cemetery was at Saqqara, overlooking the capital of early times, Memphis.

Mastabas evolved over the early dynastic period (c. 3100–2686 BCE). During the 1st Dynasty, a mastaba was constructed simulating house plans of several rooms, a central one containing the sarcophagus and others surrounding it to receive the abundant funerary offerings. The whole was built in a shallow pit above which a brick superstructure covering a broad area. The typical 2nd and 3rd Dynasty (c. 2686–2313) mastabas was the 'stairway mastaba', the tomb chamber of which sank deeper than before and was connected to the top with an inclined shaft and stairs. Many of the features of mastabas grew into those of the pyramids, indicating their importance as a transitory construction of tombs. This notably includes the exterior appearance of the tombs, as the sloped sides of the mastabas extended to form a pyramid. The first and most striking example of this was Djoser's step pyramid, which combined many traditional features of mastabas with a more monumental stone construction.

Even after pyramids became more prevalent for pharaohs in the 3rd and 4th Dynasties, members of the nobility continued to be buried in mastaba tombs. This is especially evident on the Giza Plateau, where at least 150 mastaba tombs have been constructed alongside the pyramids.

In the 4th Dynasty (c. 2613 to 2494 BCE), rock-cut tombs began to appear. These were tombs built into the rock cliffs in Upper Egypt in an attempt to further thwart grave robbers. Mastabas, then, were developed with the addition of offering chapels and vertical shafts. 5th Dynasty mastabas had elaborate chapels consisting of several rooms, columned halls and 'serdab'. The actual tomb chamber was built below the south-end of mastaba, connected by a slanting passage to a stairway emerging in the center of a columned hall or court.

Mastabas are still well attested in the Middle Kingdom, where they had a revival. They were often solid structures with the decoration only on the outside.

By the time of the New Kingdom (which began with the 18th Dynasty around 1550 BC), "the mastaba becomes rare, being largely superseded by the independent pyramid chapel above a burial chamber".

== Examples ==
=== Non-royal ===
- Mastaba of Hesy-Re
- Mastaba of Kaninisut
- Mastaba of Seshemnefer
- Mastaba S3503
- Mastaba S3504

=== Royal ===
- Buried Mastaba (Sekhemkhet)
- Mastabat al-Fir'aun (Shepseskaf)
- Mastaba of Neferefre (Neferefre)

== See also ==
- Cemetery GIS
- Meidum
- Architecture of Palestine: mastabeh or mastaba as raised, indoor or outdoor "unsoiled" area in traditional Palestinian architecture
