= Meretseger =

Ancient Egyptian cobra-goddess

Name in hieroglyphs
mr r O34 W11 r B1 I12
- Major cult center: Theban Necropolis, Deir el-Medina
- Symbol: Cobra snake

Meretseger (also known as Mersegrit' or Mertseger) was a Theban cobra-goddess in ancient Egyptian religion, in charge with guarding and protecting the vast Theban Necropolis — on the west bank of the Nile, in front of Thebes — and especially the heavily guarded Valley of the Kings. Her cult was typical of the New Kingdom of Egypt (1550–1070 BC).

== Role and characteristics ==
Meretseger's name means "She Who Loves Silence", in reference to the silence of the desert cemetery area she kept or, according to another interpretation, "Beloved of Him Who Makes Silence (Osiris)".

Meretseger was the patron of the artisans and workers of the village of Deir el-Medina, who built and decorated the great royal and noble tombs. Desecrations of rich royal burials were already in progress from the Old Kingdom of Egypt (27th/22nd century BC), sometimes by the workers themselves: the genesis of Meretseger was the spontaneous need to identify a guardian goddess, both dangerous and merciful, of the tombs of sovereigns and aristocrats. Her cult, also present in Esna (near Luxor), reached its peak during the 18th Dynasty. A royal wife of the Middle Kingdom pharaoh Senusret III (c. 1878–1839 BC) was called Meretseger; she was the first to bear the title Great Royal Wife (which became the standard title for chief wives of Pharaohs) and the first whose name was written in a cartouche: however, as there are no contemporary sources relating to the Great Royal Wife Meretseger, this homonym of the goddess is most likely a creation of the New Kingdom.

The goddess Meretseger was worshiped by the workers' guild, who feared her wrath very much. Being a local deity, only small rock temples were dedicated to her (such as the one located on the path leading to the Valley of the Queens) and some stelae with prayers and poignant requests for forgiveness, as well as various cappelletti right at the foot of the hill dedicated to her — which was her embodiment too. She was sometimes associated with Hathor: even the latter was considered a protector of the graves in her funerary aspects of "Lady Of The West" and "Lady Of The Necropolis" who opened the gates of the underworld. Her close association with the Valley of the Kings prevented her becoming anything more than a local deity, and when the valley ceased being in use (and Thebes was abandoned as a capital), so she also ceased being worshipped (11th/10th century BC).

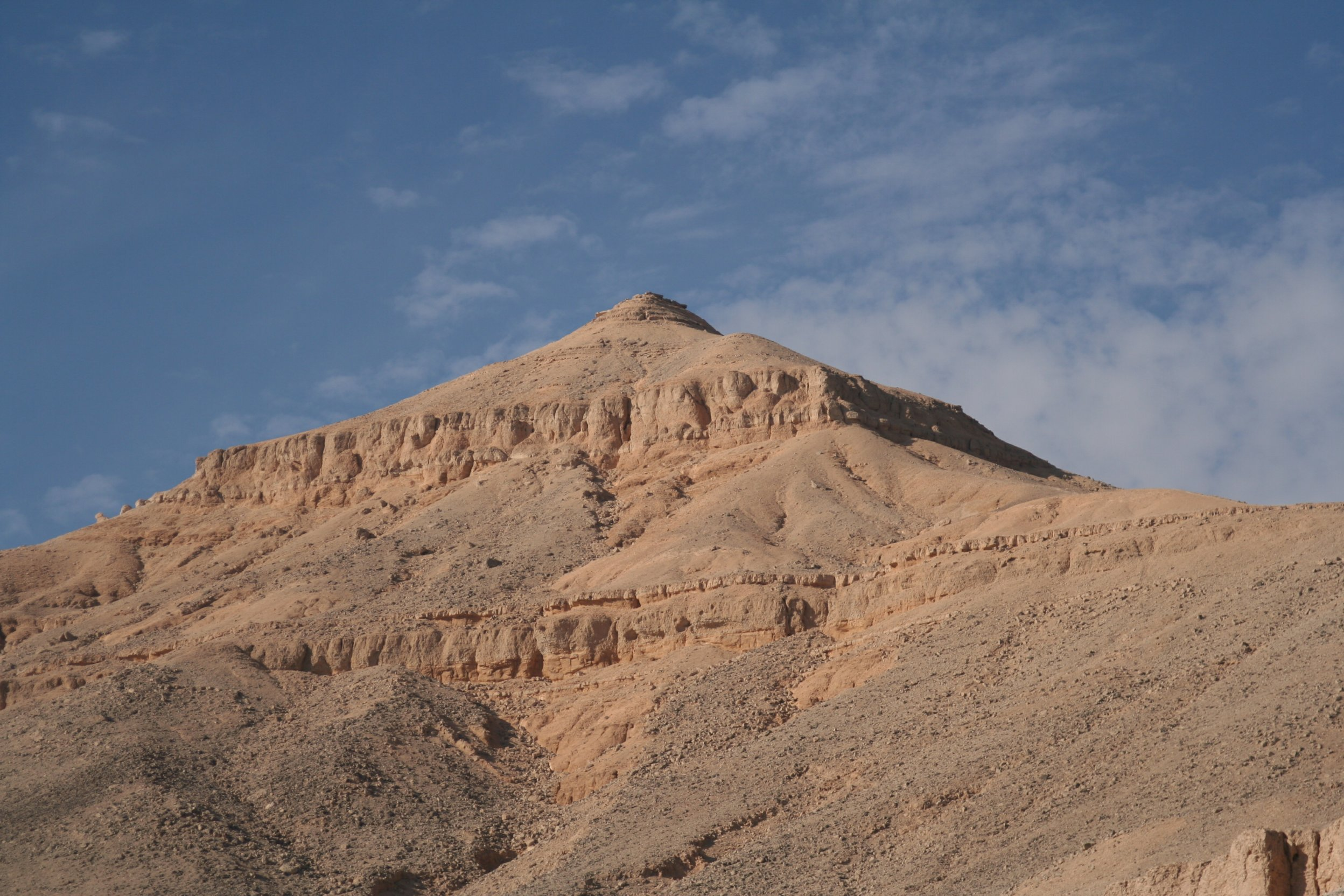
El Qurn, the sharp peak overlooking the Valley of the Kings.

=== Meretseger's hill ===
Meretseger was especially associated with the hill now called el Qurn "The Horn" (Ancient Egyptian: tꜣ-dhnt "The Peak"), a natural peak, the highest point (420 m) in the Theban Hills, which dramatically overlooks the Valley of the Kings. It has an almost pyramidal shape when viewed from the entrance to the Valley of the Kings, and therefore some Egyptologists believe it may have been the reason for choosing the location as a royal necropolis. El Qurn, also believed to be one of the entrances to the Duat (underworld), was sacred to both Meretseger and Hathor, but the former was considered its real personification. For this reason, two of Meretseger's many epithets were "Peak of the West" (Dehent-Imentet) and "Lady Of The Peak". Many small stelae created by artisans and workers have been found as evidence of devotion to their favorite deities: in addition to Meretseger, Ptah, Amun, Hathor, Thoth and the deified pharaoh Amenhotep I (c. 1525–1504 BC), whose cult was very popular in Deir el-Medina.

=== Stela of Neferabu ===
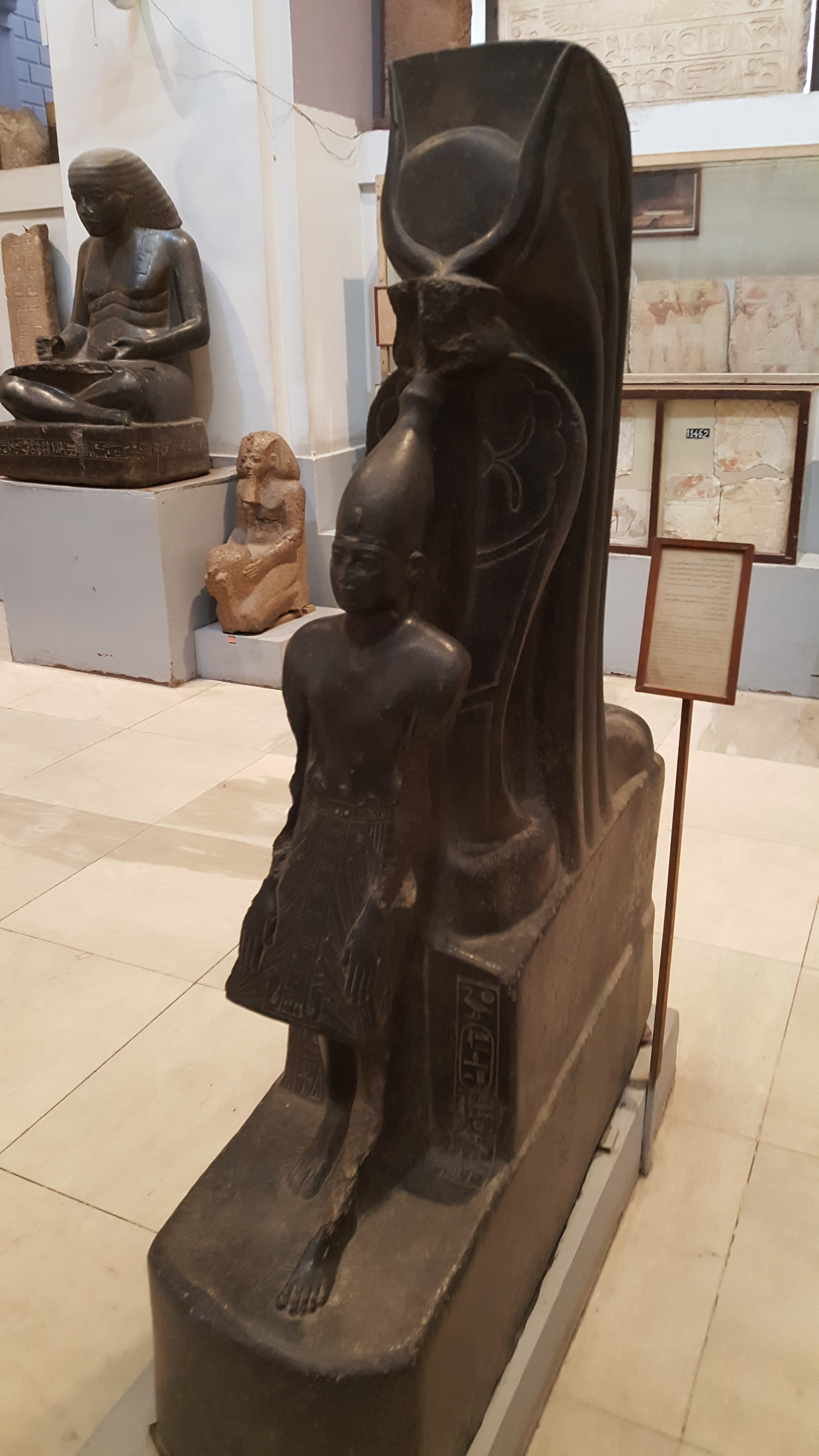
Black granite statue of Meretsger protecting Pharaoh Amenhotep II (1427–1401 BC).

It was believed that Meretseger punished the workers who committed a sacrilege (by stealing something from the royal graves or the building sites — copper instruments were particularly precious — as well as those who failed in an oath) poisoning them with her bite. But she was also considered generous in forgiving those who repented to her and, in this case, would heal him from physical evil. This is the case of the draftsman Neferabu, who would have been cured of blindness after having begged Meretseger, as he himself was able to attest on a limestone stela (Museo egizio, Turin) dedicated to her:

Giving praise to the Peak of the West, kissing the ground to her ka, I give praise, hear (my) call, I was a truthful man on earth! Made by the servant of the Place-of-Truth, Neferabu, justified. (I was) an ignorant man and foolish, who knew not good from evil, I did the transgression against the Peak, and she taught a lesson to me. I was in her hand by night as by day, I sat on bricks like the woman on labor, I called to the wind, it came not to me, I libated to the Peak of the West, great of strength, and to every god and goddess. Behold, I will say to the great and small, who are in the troop: beware the Peak! For there is a lion within her! The Peak strikes with the stroke of a savage lion, she is after him who offends her! I called upon my Mistress, I found her coming to me as a sweet breeze; she was merciful to me, having made me see her hand. She returned to me appeased, she made my malady forgotten; for the Peak of the West is appeased, if one calls upon her. So says Neferabu, justified. He says: Behold, let hear every ear, that lives upon earth: beware the Peak of the West!

— stela of Neferabu

In relation to the Egyptians with their divinities, the concepts of sin, repentance and forgiveness were very unusual; these characteristics of Meretseger's cult appear to be a unicum.

=== Rock shrine in Deir el-Medina ===
Meretseger's rock shrine in Deir el-Medina was formed by a series of caves placed in a semicircle, whose vaults however collapsed due to earthquakes, and on the outer walls still retains many steles, while a large number of fragments have been inventoried and distributed to various museums. It was also dedicated to the most revered Ptah, god of craftsmen and artisans. Overlying the temple there is a rock with the shape of a snake's head. The large amount of material found confirms that the temple was very popular and famous — locally.

=== Iconography ===
Meretseger was sometimes portrayed as a cobra-headed woman, though this iconography is rather rare: in this case she could hold the was-sceptre as well as having her head surmounted by a feather and being armed with two knives. More commonly, she was depicted as a woman-headed snake or scorpion, a cobra-headed sphinx, lion-headed cobra or three-headed (woman, snake and vulture) cobra. On various steles, she wears a modius surmounted by the solar disk and by two feathers, or the hathoric crown (the solar disk between two bovine horns). Her main artistic depictions are inside lavish royal tombs, for example:

- the tomb (TT56) of Userhat, "Scribe who Counts the Bread for Upper And Lower Egypt" under Pharaoh Amenhotep II (1427–1401 BC), where she appears with Montu;
- the tomb (KV14) of Queen Twosret (c. 1191–1189 BC) and Pharaoh Setnakhte (c. 1189–1186 BC), where she appears genuflected;
- the tomb (KV9) of Pharaoh Ramesses VI (c. 1144–1136 BC), where she appears, along with Khonsu, Amun-ra, Ptah-Sokar and Ra-Horakhty, receiving offerings by the King himself;
- the tomb (KV18) of Pharaoh Ramesses X (c. 1111–1107 BC), where she appears with Ra-Horakhty;
- the tomb (KV4) of Pharaoh Ramesses XI (c. 1107–1077 BC), where she appears with many deities.

== Gallery ==
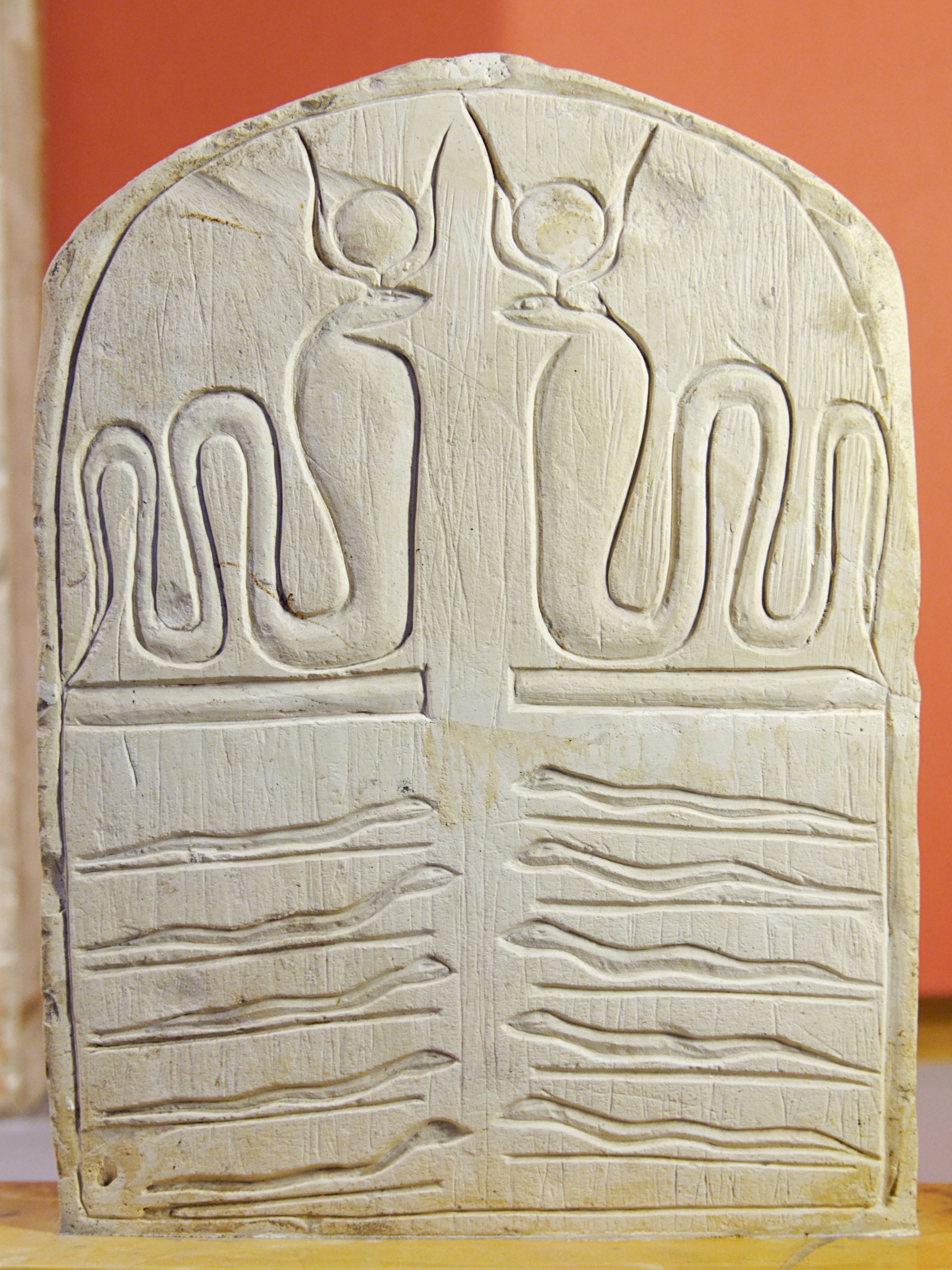
Double image of Meretseger (upper tier) and snakes (lower tier). Louvre, Paris.

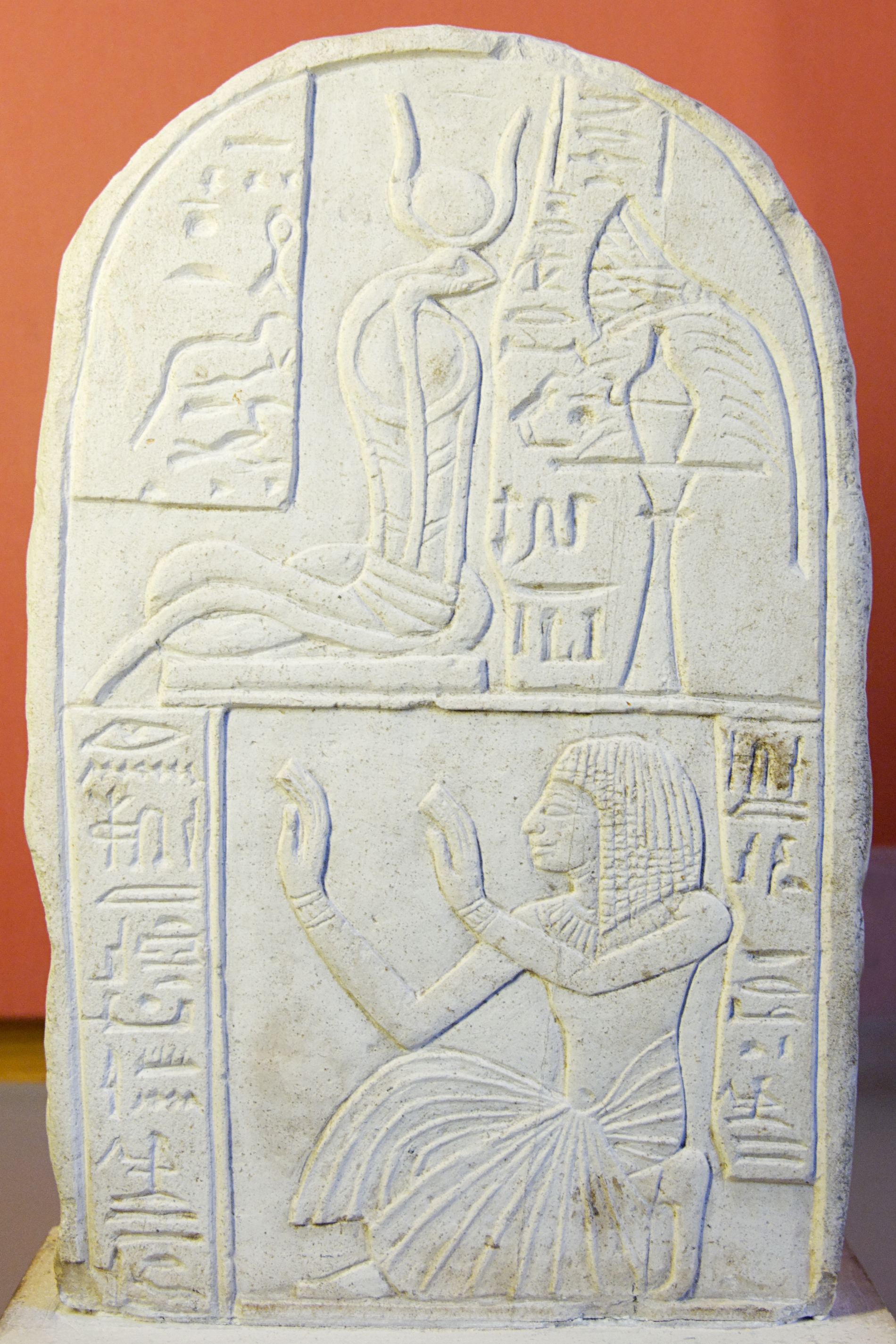
Stela with the drawer Nakhtimen adoring Meretseger. Louvre, Paris.

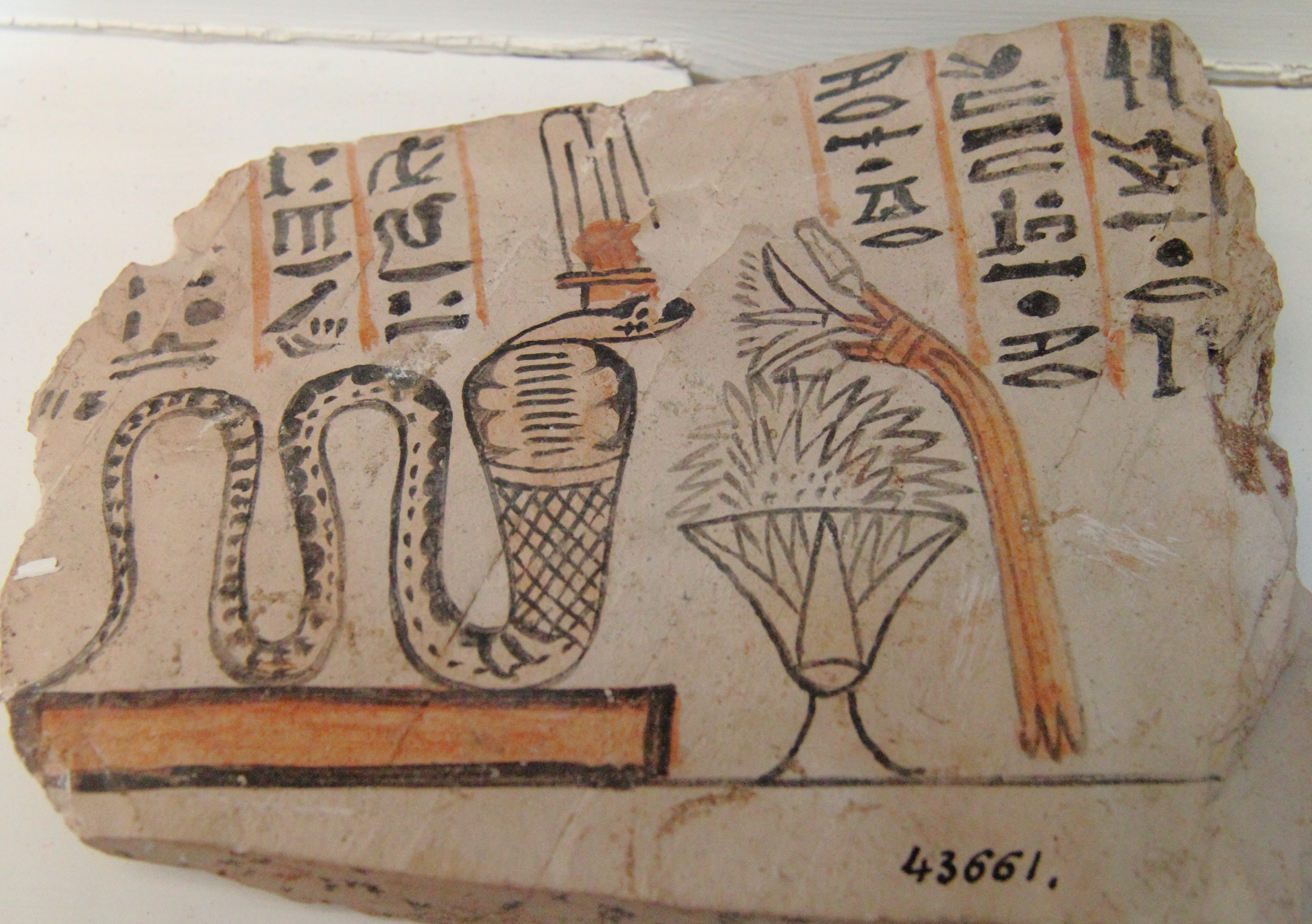
Meretseger on an ostracon. Egyptian Museum, Cairo.

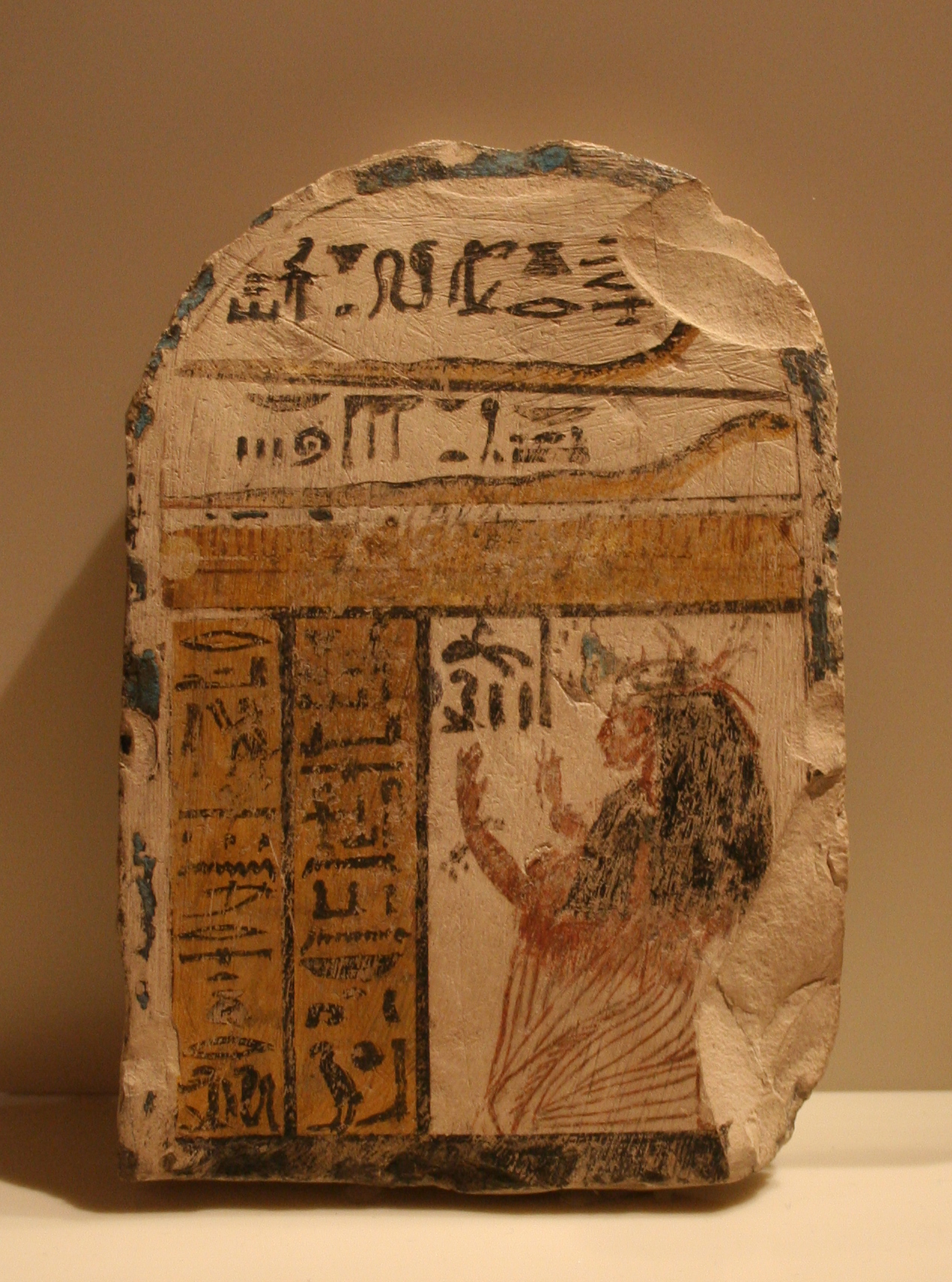
Stela with a woman adoring Meretsenger. Egyptian Museum of Berlin.

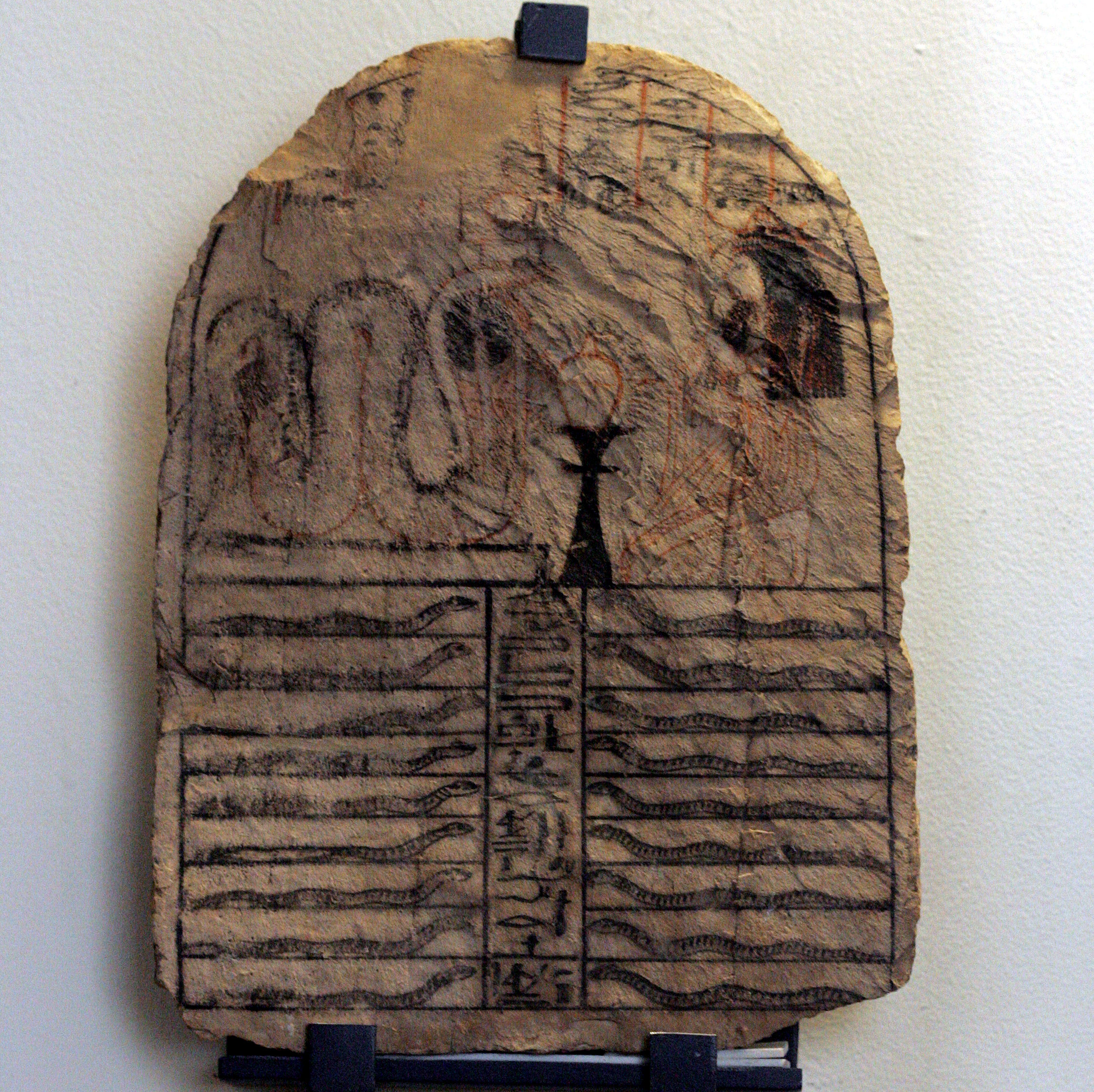
Stela with a woman adoring Meretseger above many snakes. Louvre, Paris.

== Bibliography ==
- Hart, George (1986), A Dictionary of Egyptian Gods and Goddesses, London: Routledge, ISBN 0-415-05909-7.
- Ions, Veronica (1973). Egyptian Mythology, London: Paul Hamlyn. ISBN 0-600-02365-6.
- Pinch, Geraldine (2004). Egyptian Mythology: A Guide to the Gods, Goddesses, and Traditions of Ancient Egypt, Oxford: University Press. ISBN 978-0195170245.
- Wilkinson, Richard H. (2003), The Complete Gods and Goddesses of Ancient Egypt, Thames & Hudson, ISBN 0-500-05120-8.
