= Mastaba S3503 =

Ancient Egyptian mastaba

Coordinates: 29.8807°N 31.2212°E

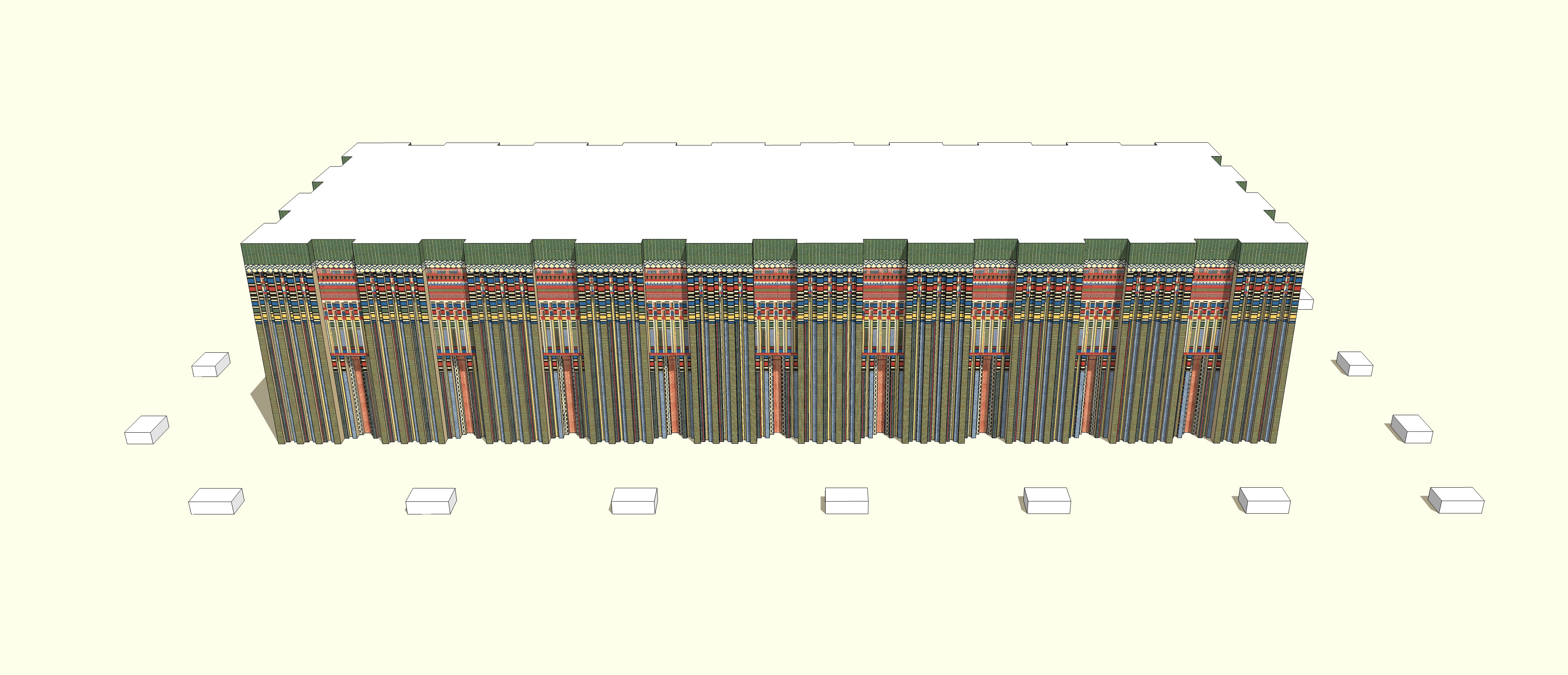
Reconstruction of Mastaba S3503

Mastaba S3503 (Saqqara Tomb No. 3503) is a large mastaba tomb at the Saqqara necropolis in Lower Egypt. The burial was constructed around 3000 BC during the First Dynasty of Ancient Egypt.

== Structure ==
The structure was excavated by Walter Bryan Emery and his team at Saqqara. The superstructure of the mastaba is 42 metres long and 16 metres wide and was made from sun-dried mudbricks. The exterior was decorated with a palace facade, with nine niches on the long sides and three on each of the short sides. Within the structure were 23 chambers. Below the ground level was a large burial chamber in the middle of the building with four side chambers. There are 20 subsidiary tombs arranged around the structure.

== Contents ==
The tomb was probably robbed in ancient times. The burial chamber was also robbed, but still contained many items in their original locations when it was excavated, which allowed a relatively good idea of the original contents.

In the centre of the tomb chamber was a large sarcophagus, of which only a few wooden planks were found. It measured about 2.7 x 1.8 metres. The remains of a skeleton were also found, but it could not be determined whether they belonged to a man or a woman. On the east side of the sarcophagus were bowls and vessels, which formed a meal for the deceased. On the walls of the burial chamber were many stone and pottery vessels, but also the remains of a chest. North of the sarcophagus were poles which were probably intended for a canopy or a tent.

== Occupant ==
The sole occupant's identity is unknown. Emery suggested it was Queen Meritneith, since her name appeared on some objects and cylinder sealings with her name and that of King Djer were found in the tomb. This suggestion has since been abandoned, since Meritneith's tomb has been found at Abydos. The occupant of S3503 therefore remains anonymous. Others have suggested an individual named Seshemka.

== Bibliography ==
- Walter B. Emery: The Great Tombs of the First Dynasty. Vol 2. Egypt Exploration Society, London 1954, pp. 128–170.
