= Cemetery GIS =

Necropolis on the Giza Plateau, Egypt

Coordinates: 29.9761°N 31.1328°E

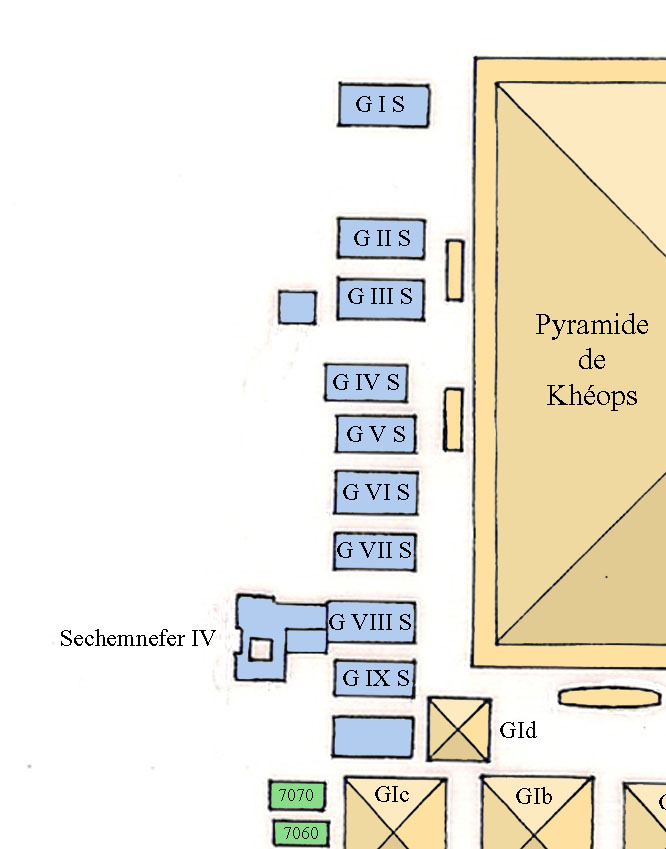
Map of Cemetery G I S

Cemetery GIS is a necropolis in the Giza Plateau. It derives its name from its proximity to pyramid G I (Khufu). The tombs are located on the south side of that pyramid and hence the name G I South Cemetery. Reisner thought the cemetery a continuation of the G7000 cemetery which is part of the Giza East Field. The construction postdates that of mastaba G 7070 of Sneferukhaf. Junker dated the cemetery to the reign of Menkaure based on the presence of granite powder thought to derive from the dressing of the second pyramid at Giza. Reisner allows for a possible construction date dating to the reign of Khafre.

This cemetery also contains several mastabas built of stone, which date to as late as the 6th Dynasty. Tombs from the time of Menkaure include the mastabas of the royal chamberlain Khaemnefert, the King's son Khufudjedef who was master of the royal largesse, and an official named Niankhre.

== Mastabas ==
The following are a collection of mastabas found in this cemetery. There are also many shafts without any superstructure that belong to this cemetery, but these have not been included in the table.

Tomb number	Name of owner	Title owner	Time Period	Comments
G I S No.1 (Mastaba I)			4th dynasty (Menkaure)	
G I S No.2 (Mastaba III)	Kaemnefret	Royal chamberlain	4th dynasty (Menkaure)	The tomb had 3 shafts and a chapel. A granite sarcophagus inscribed for Khaemnefret was found in the burial chamber of shaft S 66.
G I S No.3 (Mastaba IV)	Khufudjedef	Master of royal reversion-offerings	4th dynasty (Menkaure)	The tomb had 2 shafts and a chapel. A red granite sarcophagus inscribed for Khufudjedef was found in the burial chamber of shaft S 68.
G I S No.4 (LG 52)	Niankhre		4th dynasty (Menkaure)	
G I S No.5 (Mastaba VI)			4th dynasty (Menkaure)	The mastaba has two burial shafts and a chapel.
G I S No.6 (Mastaba VII)			4th dynasty (Menkaure)	The mastaba has two burial shafts and a chapel.
G I S No.8 (Mastaba IX)	Sekhemka	Royal chief, judge and administrator, priest of Maat	5th or 6th dynasty (Possibly Unas – Teti)	A statue of Sekhemka was found in the chapel. Two sons, named Khaemnefret and Ini, are mentioned in scenes in the chapel.
G I S No.9 (Mastaba X)			4th dynasty (Menkaure)	The mastaba has two burial shafts.
G I S No.10 (Mastaba XI)			4th dynasty (Menkaure)	

Unnumbered tombs from the G I S cemetery include:

Name of owner	Title owner	Time period	Material	Comments
Heneni	Overseer and judge of scribes, sole companion, lector-priest	6th dynasty	Stone mastaba	The tomb has three shafts and a chapel
Isu and Meshedu	ka-priests	6th dynasty	Mud-brick mastaba	The tomb has nine shafts and a chapel
Itjef	Inspector of letter carriers	6th dynasty	Mud-brick mastaba	The tomb has two shafts and three serdabs. ALso known as Junker No. 9
Iymery	Royal wab-priest, inspector of royal document scribes of the treasury, inspector of scribes of the royal linen	6th dynasty	Stone mastaba	The tomb has three shafts, a serdab, and a chapel. The tomb is just off the south of G I-S No. 3
Khenut	Royal acquaintance	6th dynasty	Stone mastaba	The tomb has two shafts, two serdabs, and a chapel.
Khnumnefer	Sole companion, keeper of the diadem, inspector of the king's hairdressers	6th dynasty	Stone and brick mastaba	The tomb has two shafts, two serdabs, and a chapel. Also known as Junker No: S 46
Seshemnefer IV	Director of the two thrones in the Mansion of Life, secretary of all secret commands of the king, chief of Bat	end of 5th to 6th dynasty (Unas to Teti)	Stone mastaba	Possibly identical with a man named Seshemnefer in G 5170, who was the eldest son of Seshemnefer III (owner of G 5170). Also known as Lepsius 53. Sons: Ptahetep, Neferseshemptah Sheshi, Seshemnefer Tjeti ?, Shetnu?
Hetepheres	Royal acquaintance, revered before her husband, priestess of Neith	end of 5th to 6th dynasty	Stone mastaba	Also known as Lepsius 54. The tomb is linked with Lepsius 53, the tomb of Seshemnefer IV
Niankhre	Inspector of physicians of the Great House, priest of Heka, priest of Horus-who-is-in-Shenwet, priest of Anubis-foremost-of-Sepa.	Late 5th to 6th dynasty	Stone mastaba	Also known as Lepsius 55.
Hor		Saite Period		Also known as Lepsius 101.
Udjahor Psametik-sasekhmet		Saite Period		Also known as Lepsius 102.
Neferherenptah	Royal sealer of the granary	Late 5th to 6th dynasty	Rock-cut tomb	A lintel mentions his wife Nefret, and his children Imgesi, Khuit, Kaemredwy and Keki.
Niankhhathor		6th dynasty	Stone Mastaba	The tomb contains 5 shafts and 2 serdabs.
Nishenu	ka-priest, keeper of the dockyard	6th dynasty	Stone Mastaba	The tomb contains 3 shafts. Niankhhathor was the wife of Nishenu.
Nisusankh	Priest of Khufu, director of members of a phyle, inspector of wab-priests	6th dynasty	Stone Mastaba	Nisuankh's wife was named Khenut, and his son Nisukhons
Niwehebre		26th dynasty	Rock-cut tomb	Niwehebre's name was found on his sarcophagus.
Ninutjer		6th dynasty	Stone Mastaba	Wife: Henutsen, Son: Nunetjer-nedjes, Daughter: Henutsen-nedjeset
Pedesi		26th dynasty	Rock-cut tomb	
Perniankh	Rower of the bark, administrator of the treasury, royal acquaintance	6th dynasty	Rock-cut tomb	
Ptahhetep	Physician of the Great House, inspector of ka-priests	6th dynasty	Rock-cut tomb	Probably son of Seshemnefer IV
Redenptah		5th–6th dynasty	Rock-cut tomb	Wife: Iymerit
Sehetepu Tepu	Judge, overseer of scribes	5th–6th dynasty	Stone Mastab	Sehetepu Tepu appears several times in the chapel reliefs in the mastaba of Seshemnefer IV. Sons: Senedjemib Imesh, Khenu
Seshemnefer-Tjeti	Sole companion, director of the two thrones, chief of Bat	6th dynasty	Stone Mastaba	Tomb may be part of family complex of Seshemnefer IV.
Tairy		26th dynasty	Rock-cut tomb	
Tjenti		Late 5th to 6th dynasty	Rock-cut tomb	
Tjeri		26th dynasty	Stone Mastaba	
Tjetut	Royal acquaintance, beloved of her father	6th dynasty	Stone Mastaba	

== See also ==
- Giza Necropolis – overview of the Giza necropolis.
- Giza East Field – including the Queen's Pyramids from the Khufu pyramid complex and royal cemetery G 7000
- Giza West Field – including cemeteries G 1000, G 1100, G 1200 and G 5000.
