= El Qurn =

Mountain near the Valley of the Kings, Egypt

Coordinates: 25°44′11″N 32°35′46″E

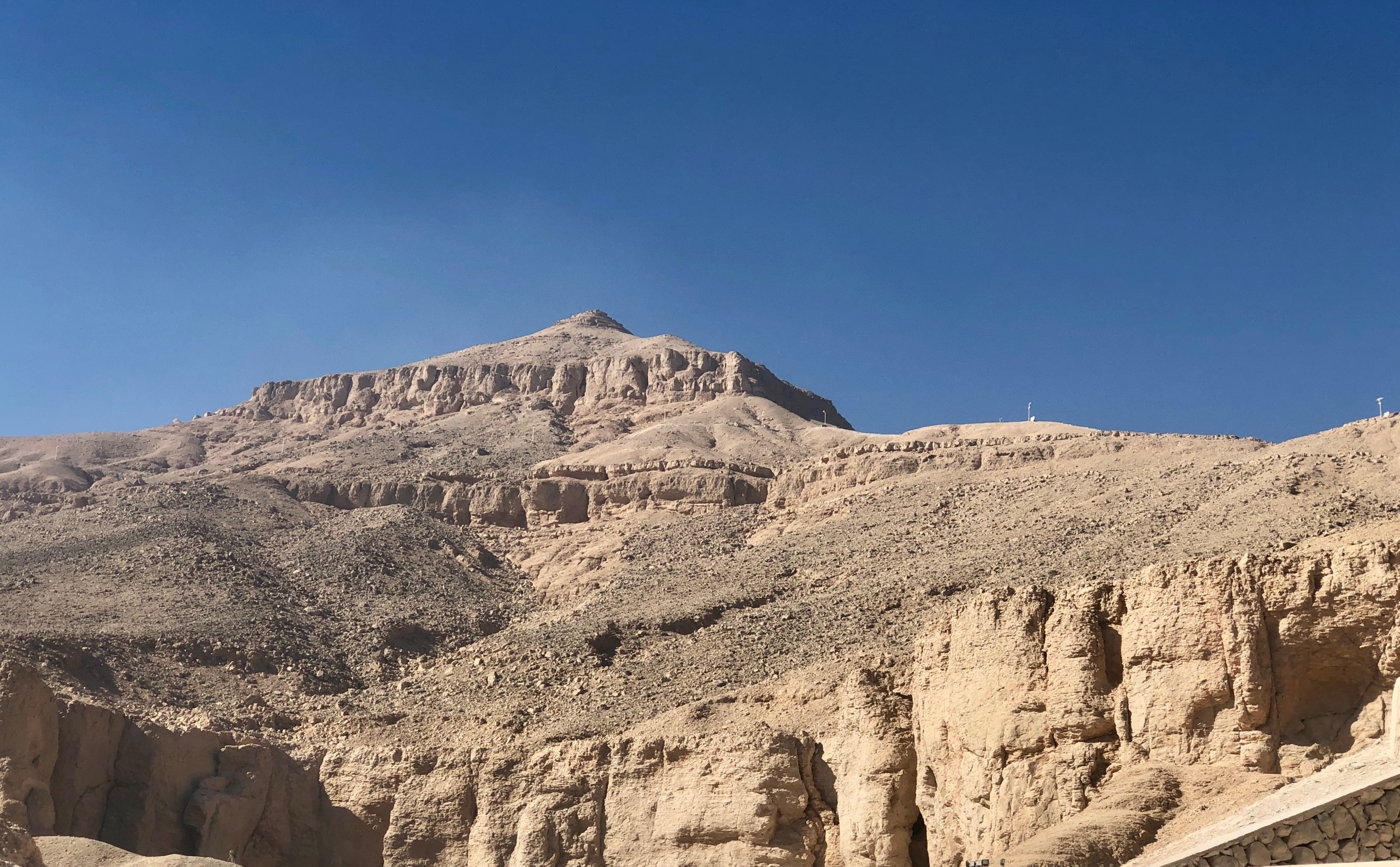
- The peak of El Qorn

Geography
- Location
- Parent range: Theban Hills

El Qurn (Arabic: القرن lit. "the horn"), is the famous point (450 m) in the Theban Hills, located on the western bank of the Nile, opposite Thebes, modern Luxor. Its ancient name was Ta Dehent, or "the peak." It has an almost pyramidal shape when viewed from the entrance to the Valley of the Kings and it is for this reason that some Egyptologists believe the valley was chosen as the location of a royal necropolis.

The area was associated with the goddess Hathor as well as the cobra goddess Meretseger. Near the highest point is a saucer-shaped rock formation projecting a few meters from the side of the hill. It is easy to note its similarity to the spreading hood of a cobra.

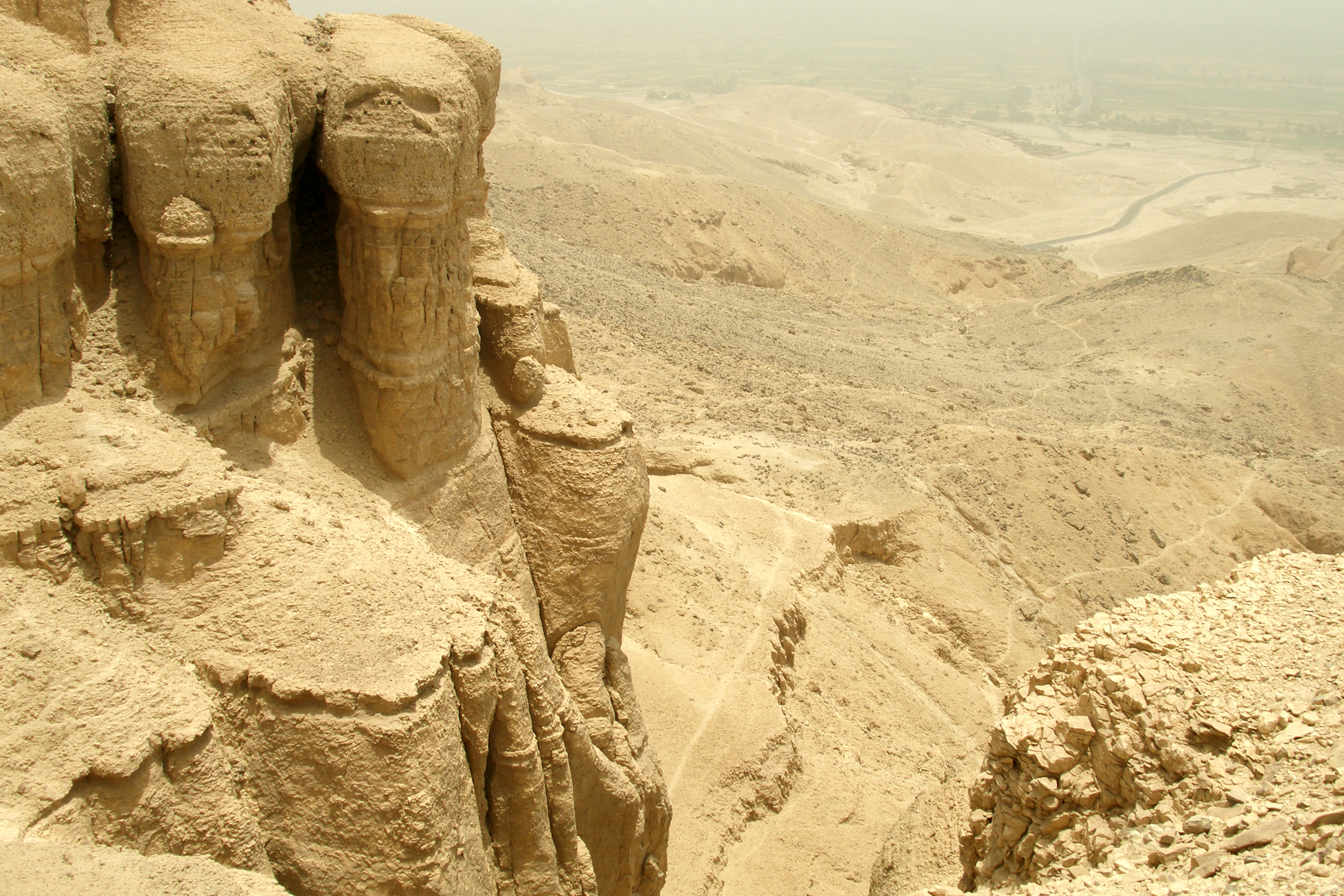
Cliffs of al-Qurn along Deir el-Medina route

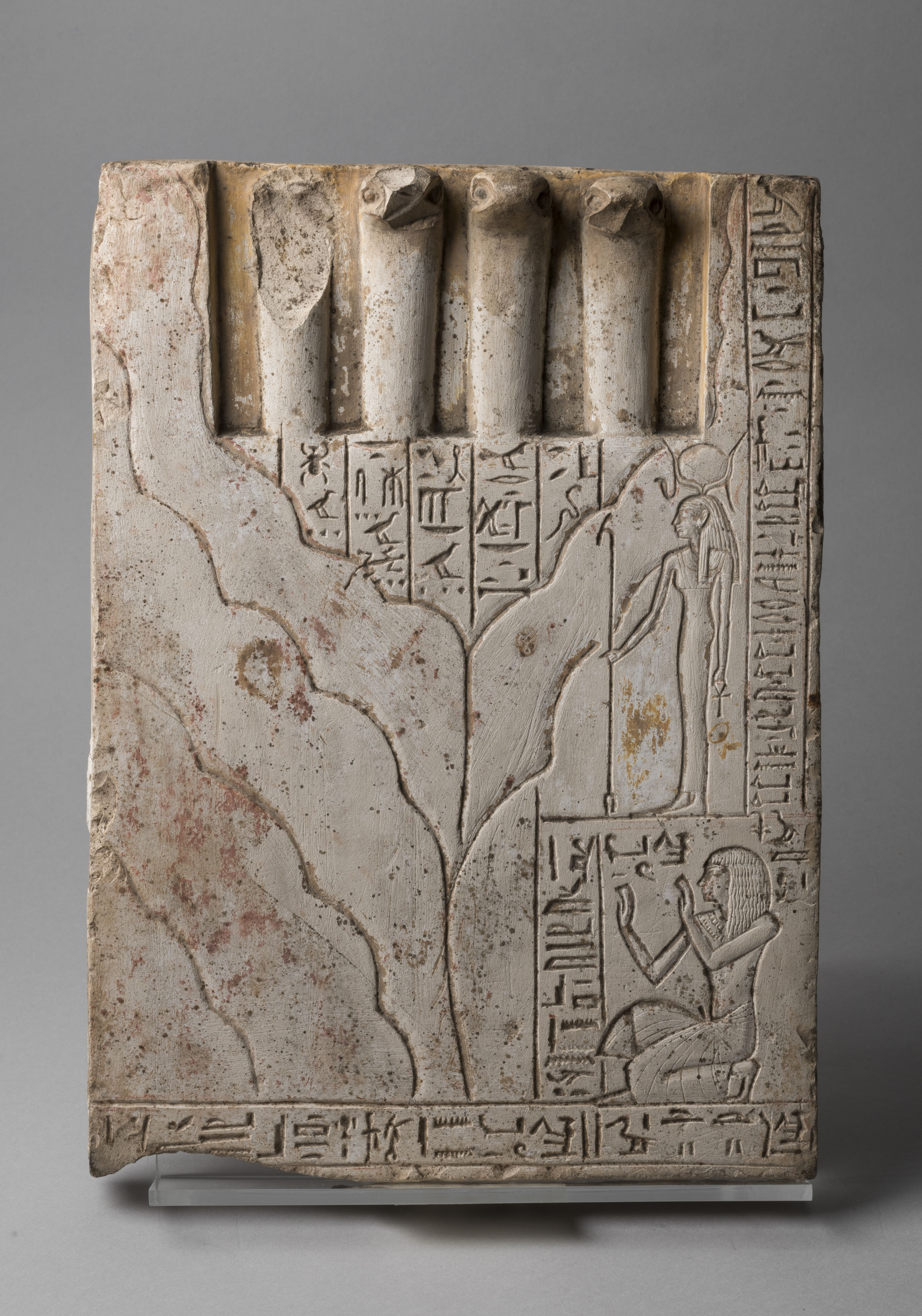
Stela of Amennakht, dedicated to "the Peak of the West", Nineteenth dynasty of Egypt (Egyptian New Kingdom), 1292–1190 BCE. Museo Egizio, Turin (C 1521).

The peak can be reached on foot from two directions, starting the climbing from the Valley of the Kings or near Deir el-Medina. The climb typically takes an hour to an hour-and-a-half, and the same time to descend. The Deir El Medina route is easier in that sense that 75% of the route is laid with concrete steps, but the other 25% may be a bit more difficult and at one point hands must be used to assist in the ascent (however, no specific climbing skills are needed). It is not suitable for the elderly or infirm. The cobra-shaped rock formation is on the Deir El Medina route but it can easily be reached from either direction.

Two staffed guard post buildings are located on the Deir El Medina route. It has been reported that climbing the mountain is no longer allowed by the government of Egypt and it is patrolled by guards as well as monitored by cameras and motion sensors. Checking with local authorities before climbing is therefore advised.

Descriptions from El Qurn forms the introduction to Johannes V. Jensens book Aandens Stadier from 1928.
