= List of Theban tombs =

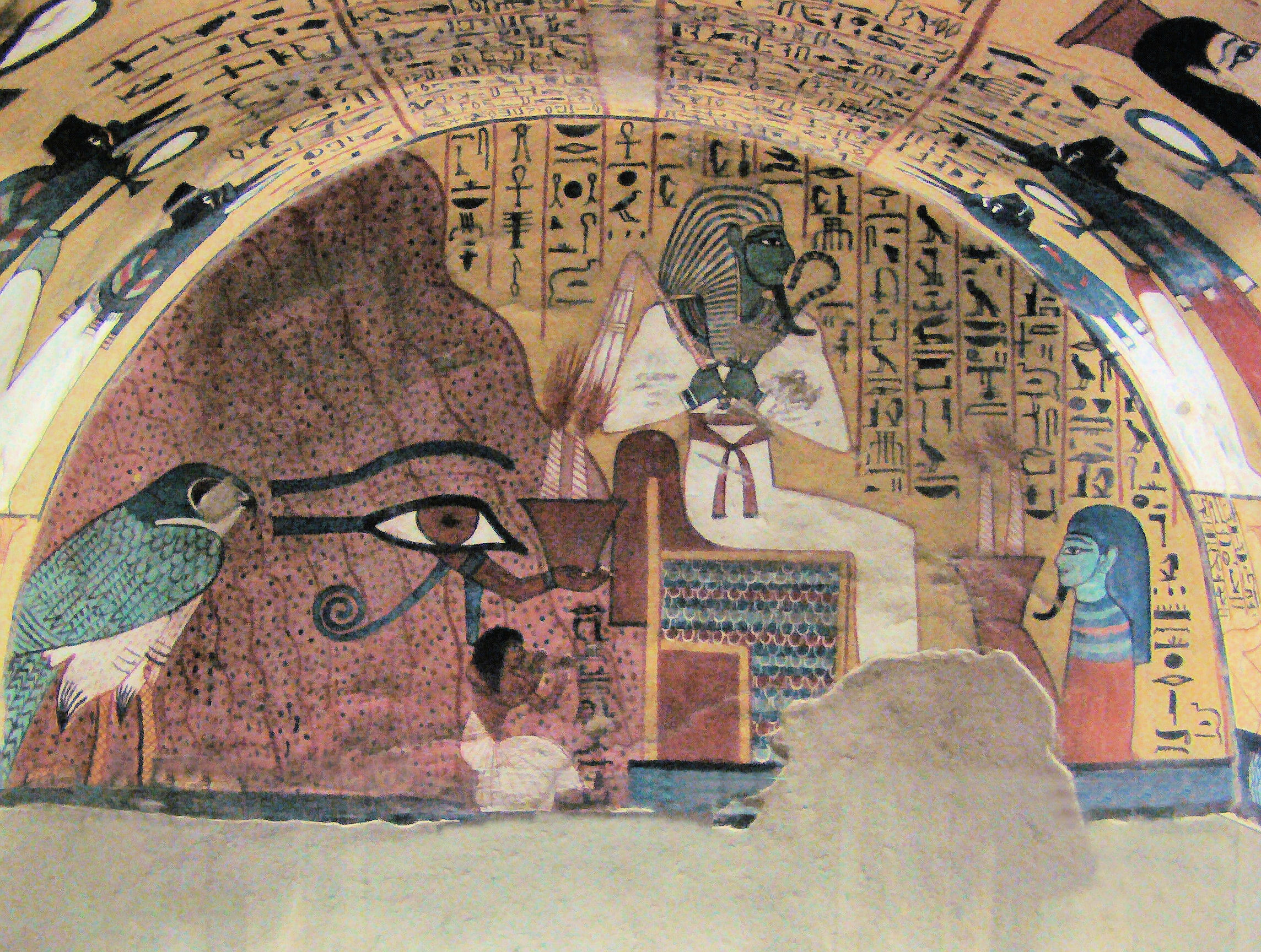
TT3: The tomb of Pashedu

The Theban Necropolis is located on the west bank of the Nile, opposite Luxor, in Egypt. As well as the more famous royal tombs located in the Valley of the Kings and the Valley of the Queens, there are numerous other tombs, more commonly referred to as Tombs of the Nobles (Luxor), the burial places of some of the powerful courtiers and persons of the ancient city.

There are at least 415 cataloged tombs, designated TT for Theban Tomb. There are other tombs whose position has been lost, or for some other reason do not conform to this classification. Theban tombs tended to have clay funerary cones placed over the entrance of the tomb chapels. During the New Kingdom they were inscribed with the title and name of the tomb owner, sometimes with short prayers. Of the 400 recorded sets of cones, only about 80 come from cataloged tombs.

The numbering system was first published Arthur Weigall's 1908 Report on the Tombs of Shêkh Abd’ el Gûrneh and el Assasîf (up to TT 45–100) and then more fully in Alan Gardiner and Arthur Weigall's 1913 A Topographical Catalogue of the Private Tombs of Thebes (TT 1–252). Gardiner and Weigall acknowledged that the numbers do not follow any topographical order, and are due the order in which the tombs were discovered. Their publication was followed by Reginald Engelbach's A Supplement to the Topographical Catalogue of the Private Tombs of Thebes (TT 253 to 334), extended further in Bernard Bruyère, N. de Garis Davies, Ahmed Fakhry, and later in Bertha Porter & Rosalind Moss's Topographical Bibliography of Ancient Egyptian Hieroglyphic Texts, Reliefs, and Paintings.

In 1996, Friederike Kampp-Seyfried published Die thebanische Nekropole zum Wandel des Grabgedankens von der XVIII. bis zur XX. Dynastie (2 vols.), documenting over 400 private tombs. She assigned numbers between dashes to previously unnumbered tombs – mainly undecorated and/or previously undocumented. These tombs are not included in the lists below.

== TT1–TT100 ==
Designation	Owner(s)	Title(s) (Note: Most of the individuals listed here had multiple titles during their lifetime. Only the highest ranking or most notable titles are mentioned here.)	Location	Dynasty(s)
TT1	Sennedjem	Servant in the Place of Truth	Deir el-Medina	19th Dynasty – Seti I, Ramesses II
TT2	Khabekhnet	Servant in the Place of Truth	Deir el-Medina	19th Dynasty – Ramesses II
TT3	Pashedu	Servant in the Place of Truth	Deir el-Medina	19th Dynasty – Seti I, Ramesses II
TT4	Qen	Sculptor of Amun	Deir el-Medina	19th Dynasty – Ramesses II
TT5	Neferabet	Servant in the Place of Truth	Deir el-Medina	20th Dynasty
TT6	Nebnefer and Neferhotep	Chief of Workmen (Nebnefer and Neferhotep)	Deir el-Medina	19th Dynasty – Horemheb – Ramesses II
TT7	Ramose	Scribe in the Place of Truth	Deir el-Medina	19th Dynasty – Ramesses II
TT8	Kha	Chief of the Great Place	Deir el-Medina	18th Dynasty – Amenhotep II, Thutmose IV – Amenhotep III
TT9	Amenmose	Servant in the Place of Truth	Deir el-Medina	20th Dynasty – Ramesses III
TT10	Kasa and Penbuy	Servant in the Place of Truth (Kasa and Penbuy)	Deir el-Medina	19th Dynasty – Ramesses II
TT11	Djehuty	Overseer of Treasury and of Works	Dra' Abu el-Naga	18th Dynasty – Hatshepsut, Thutmose III
TT12	Hery	Overseer of the Granary of Queen Ahhotep	Dra' Abu el-Naga	17th Dynasty/18th Dynasty – Seqenenre Tao – Amenhotep I
TT13	Shuroy	Chief of the Brazier-bearers of Amun	Dra' Abu el-Naga	20th Dynasty
TT14	Huy	Priest of Amenhotep, the Image of Amun	Dra' Abu el-Naga	19th Dynasty – Ramesses II
TT15	Tetiky	Mayor of Thebes	Dra' Abu el-Naga	18th Dynasty – Ahmose I
TT16	Panehsy	Prophet of Amenhotep of the Forecourt	Dra' Abu el-Naga	19th Dynasty – Ramesses II
TT17	Nebamun	Scribe, Physician of the King	Dra' Abu el-Naga	18th Dynasty – Amenhotep II
TT18	Baki	Chief Weigher of the Gold of Amun	Dra' Abu el-Naga	18th Dynasty – Thutmose III
TT19	Amenmose	First Prophet of Amenhotep of the Forecourt	Dra' Abu el-Naga	18th Dynasty – Amenhotep I
TT20	Montukherkhopshef	Mayor of Busiris	Dra' Abu el-Naga	18th Dynasty – Thutmose III
TT21	User	Scribe, Steward of Thutmose I	Sheikh Abd el-Qurna	18th Dynasty – Thutmose I
TT22	Wah, usurped by Meryamon	Eldest of the King (Wah); Royal Butler (Meryamon)	Sheikh Abd el-Qurna	18th Dynasty
TT23	Thay (Tjay) called To	Royal Scribe of Dispatches	Sheikh Abd el-Qurna	19th Dynasty – Merneptah
TT24	Nebamun	Steward of the Royal Wife Nebtu	Sheikh Abd el-Qurna	18th Dynasty – Thutmose III
TT25	Amenemheb	First Prophet of Khonsu	El-Assasif	19th Dynasty – Ramesses II
TT26	Khnumemheb	Overseer of the treasuries in the Ramesseum	El-Assasif	19th Dynasty – Ramesses II
TT27	Sheshonk	Chief steward of the Princess Ankhnesneferibre	El-Assasif	26th Dynasty – Apries, Amasis II
TT28	Hori	Officer of the Estate of Amun	El-Assasif	20th Dynasty
TT29	Amenemipet called Pairy	Vizier of the South, Mayor of Thebes	Sheikh Abd el-Qurna	18th Dynasty – Amenhotep II, Thutmose IV
TT30	Khonsumose	Scribe of the Treasury	Sheikh Abd el-Qurna	20th Dynasty – Ramesses III
TT31	Khonsu	First Prophet of Thutmose III	Sheikh Abd el-Qurna	19th Dynasty – Ramesses II
TT32	Djehutymose	Chief steward of Amun	El-Assasif	19th Dynasty – Ramesses II
TT33	Padiamenope	Prophet, Chief Lector priest	El-Assasif	25th Dynasty – Taharqa and 26th Dynasty – Psamtik I
TT34	Mentuemhat	Fourth Prophet of Amun, Mayor of Thebes	El-Assasif	25th Dynasty – Taharqa and 26th Dynasty – Psamtik I
TT35	Bakenkhonsu	High Priest of Amun	Dra' Abu el-Naga	19th Dynasty – Ramesses II
TT36	Ibi	Chief steward of the "Adorer of the God"	El-Assasif	26th Dynasty – Psamtik I
TT37	Harwa	Chief steward of the Divine Wife	El-Assasif	25th Dynasty – Taharqa
TT38	Djeserkaraseneb	Scribe, Counter of the Grain in the Granary of Amun	Sheikh Abd el-Qurna	18th Dynasty – Thutmose IV
TT39	Puimre	Second Prophet of Amun	El-Khokha	18th Dynasty – Thutmose III
TT40	Amenhotep called Huy	Viceroy of Kush	Qurnet Murai	18th Dynasty – Tutankhamun
TT41	Amenemopet called Ipy	Chief steward of Amun in Thebes	Sheikh Abd el-Qurna	19th Dynasty – Ramesses I – Ramesses II
TT42	Amenmose	Captain of Troops, Eye of the King in Retjenu	Sheikh Abd el-Qurna	18th Dynasty – Thutmose III, Amenhotep II
TT43	Neferronpet	Kitchen-master of the King	Sheikh Abd el-Qurna	18th Dynasty – Amenhotep II
TT44	Amenemheb	Priest in Front of Amun	Sheikh Abd el-Qurna	20th Dynasty
TT45	Thoth, usurped by Thothemheb	High Priest of Amun (Thoth); Chief Weaver of the Estate of Amun (Thothemheb)	Sheikh Abd el-Qurna	18th Dynasty – Amenhotep II and 19th Dynasty – Ramesses II
TT46	Ramose	Steward, Overseer of the Estate of Amun	Sheikh Abd el-Qurna	18th Dynasty – Amenhotep III, Akhenaten
TT47	Userhet	Overseer of the Royal Harim	El-Assasif	18th Dynasty – Amenhotep III
TT48	Amenemhat called Surer	Chief steward	El-Khokha	18th Dynasty – Amenhotep III
TT49	Neferhotep	Chief Scribe of Amun	El-Khokha	18th Dynasty – Tutankhamun – Horemheb
TT50	Neferhotep	Divine Father of Amun-Ra	Sheikh Abd el-Qurna	18th Dynasty – Horemheb
TT51	Userhat called Neferhabef	First Prophet of Thutmose I	Sheikh Abd el-Qurna	19th Dynasty – Seti I
TT52	Nakht	Scribe, Astronomer of Amun	Sheikh Abd el-Qurna	18th Dynasty – Thutmose IV
TT53	Amenemhat	Agent of Amun	Sheikh Abd el-Qurna	18th Dynasty – Thutmose III
TT54	Huy, usurped by Kenro and Khonsu	Sculptor of Amun (Huy); Priest of Khonsu (Kenro)	Sheikh Abd el-Qurna	18th Dynasty – Thutmose IV, Amenhotep III
TT55	Ramose	Vizier of the South, Mayor of Thebes	Sheikh Abd el-Qurna	18th Dynasty – Amenhotep III, Akhenaten
TT56	Userhet	Royal Scribe, Child of the Royal Nursery	Sheikh Abd el-Qurna	18th Dynasty – Amenhotep II
TT57	Khaemhat	Royal Scribe, Overseer of Royal Granaries	Sheikh Abd el-Qurna	18th Dynasty – Amenhotep III
TT58	Unknown, usurped by Amenhotep and Amenemonet	Overseer of the prophets of Amun (Amenhotep); Scribe in the Ramesseum (Amenemonet)	Sheikh Abd el-Qurna	18th Dynasty – Amenhotep III and 19th Dynasty – 20th Dynasty
TT59	Qen	First Prophet of Mut, Lady of Asher	Sheikh Abd el-Qurna	18th Dynasty – Thutmose III
TT60	Senet	Mother or wife of Intefiqer.	Sheikh Abd el-Qurna	12th Dynasty – Senusret I
TT61	Useramen	Vizier of the South, Mayor of Thebes	Sheikh Abd el-Qurna	18th Dynasty – Hatshepsut, Thutmose III
TT62	Amenemwaskhet	Overseer of the Cabinet	Sheikh Abd el-Qurna	18th Dynasty – Thutmose III
TT63	Sebekhotep	Overseer of the seal	Sheikh Abd el-Qurna	18th Dynasty – Thutmose IV
TT64	Hekerneheh	Nurse of the Royal Son	Sheikh Abd el-Qurna	18th Dynasty – Thutmose IV, Amenhotep III
TT65	Nebamon, usurped by Imiseba	Scribe of the Royal Accounts (Nebamon); Chief of the Altar (Imiseba)	Sheikh Abd el-Qurna	18th Dynasty – Hatshepsut
TT66	Hepu	Vizier of the South	Sheikh Abd el-Qurna	18th Dynasty – Thutmose IV
TT67	Hapuseneb	High Priest of Amun	Sheikh Abd el-Qurna	18th Dynasty – Hatshepsut
TT68	Meryptah, usurped by Paenkhemenu, usurped again by Nespaneferhor and Hor	High Priest of Amun (Meryptah); Wab-priest of Amun (Paenkhemenu); Head of the Temple scribed of Amun (Nespaneferhor)	Sheikh Abd el-Qurna	18th Dynasty – Amenhotep III – Akhenaten, 20th Dynasty – Ramesses III, and 21st Dynasty – Siamun
TT69	Menna	Scribe of the Fields of the King	Sheikh Abd el-Qurna	18th Dynasty – Thutmose IV, Amenhotep III?
TT70	Unknown, usurped by Amenmose	Overseer of Artificers of Amun (Amenmose)	Sheikh Abd el-Qurna	21st Dynasty
TT71	Senenmut	Chief steward, Steward of Amun	Sheikh Abd el-Qurna	18th Dynasty – Hatshepsut
TT72	Re	High Priest of Amun	Sheikh Abd el-Qurna	18th Dynasty – Amenhotep II
TT73	Amenhotep	Chief steward, Overseer of Works	Sheikh Abd el-Qurna	18th Dynasty – Hatshepsut
TT74	Tjanuny	Royal Scribe, Commander of Troops	Sheikh Abd el-Qurna	18th Dynasty – Thutmose IV
TT75	Amenhotep-si-se	Second Prophet of Amun	Sheikh Abd el-Qurna	18th Dynasty – Thutmose IV
TT76	Thenuna	Fan-bearer on the Right Side of the King	Sheikh Abd el-Qurna	18th Dynasty – Thutmose IV
TT77	Ptahemhet, usurped by Roy	Standard-beaer of the King (Ptahemhet)	Sheikh Abd el-Qurna	18th Dynasty – Thutmose IV
TT78	Horemheb	Superintendent of the Sacred Cattle, Captain of Archers	Sheikh Abd el-Qurna	18th Dynasty – Thutmose III, Amenhotep III
TT79	Menkheper (Menkheperreseneb)	Scribe of the King's Granaries	Sheikh Abd el-Qurna	18th Dynasty – Thutmose III, Amenhotep II
TT80	Tutnefer	Prince, Scribe of the Treasury	Sheikh Abd el-Qurna	18th Dynasty – Amenhotep II
TT81	Ineni	Architect of Thutmose I	Sheikh Abd el-Qurna	18th Dynasty – Amenhotep I – Thutmose III
TT82	Amenemhat	Scribe of the Grain	Sheikh Abd el-Qurna	18th Dynasty – Thutmose III
TT83	Amethu called Ahmose	Vizier of the South	Sheikh Abd el-Qurna	18th Dynasty – Thutmose III
TT84	Amunedjeh	Prince, First herald of the king, Steward of the Palace	Sheikh Abd el-Qurna	18th Dynasty – Thutmose III
TT85	Amenemheb, also called Mahu	Prince, Royal Registrar	Sheikh Abd el-Qurna	18th Dynasty – Thutmose III, Amenhotep II
TT86	Menkheperraseneb I	High Priest of Amun	Sheikh Abd el-Qurna	18th Dynasty – Thutmose III
TT87	Minnakhte	Superintendent of the Granaries	Sheikh Abd el-Qurna	18th Dynasty – Thutmose III
TT88	Pehsukher, also called Thenenu	Prince, Royal Registrar, Standard-Bearer of the King	Sheikh Abd el-Qurna	18th Dynasty – Thutmose III, Amenhotep II
TT89	Amenmose	Steward in the Southern City	Sheikh Abd el-Qurna	18th Dynasty – Amenhotep III
TT90	Nebamon	Captain of Troops of Police on the West of Thebes, Standardbearer of the Royal Barque	Sheikh Abd el-Qurna	18th Dynasty – Thutmose IV, Amenhotep III
TT91	Unknown	Captain of Troops, Overseer of Horses	Sheikh Abd el-Qurna	18th Dynasty – Thutmose IV, Amenhotep III
TT92	Suemnut	Cupbearer of the King	Sheikh Abd el-Qurna	18th Dynasty – Amenhotep II
TT93	Kenamon	High steward, Royal Steward of Amenhotep II	Sheikh Abd el-Qurna	18th Dynasty – Amenhotep II
TT94	Amy, also called Ramose	First herald of the king, Fan-bearer on the Right Side of the King	Sheikh Abd el-Qurna	18th Dynasty – Amenhotep II
TT95	Mery	High Priest of Amun	Sheikh Abd el-Qurna	18th Dynasty – Amenhotep II
TT96	Sennefer	Mayor of Thebes	Sheikh Abd el-Qurna	18th Dynasty – Amenhotep II
TT97	Amenemhat	High Priest of Amun	Sheikh Abd el-Qurna	18th Dynasty – Amenhotep II
TT98	Kaemheribsen	Third Prophet of Amun	Sheikh Abd el-Qurna	18th Dynasty – Thutmose III, Amenhotep II
TT99	Sennefer	Overseer of the seal	Sheikh Abd el-Qurna	18th Dynasty – Thutmose III
TT100	Rekhmire	Vizier of the South	Sheikh Abd el-Qurna	18th Dynasty – Thutmose III, Amenhotep II

== TT101–TT200 ==
Designation	Owner(s)	Title(s)	Location	Dynasty(s)
TT101	Thanuro	Cupbearer of the King	Sheikh Abd el-Qurna	18th Dynasty – Amenhotep II
TT102	Imhotep	Royal Scribe, child of the nursery	Sheikh Abd el-Qurna	18th Dynasty – Amenhotep III
TT103 (MMA 807)	Dagi	Mayor of the town, Vizier	Sheikh Abd el-Qurna	11th Dynasty – Mentuhotep II
TT104	Tutnefer	Overseer of the treasuries	Sheikh Abd el-Qurna	18th Dynasty – Amenhotep II
TT105	Khaemopet	Priest of the noble standard of Amun	Sheikh Abd el-Qurna	19th Dynasty
TT106	Paser	Vizier of the South, High Priest of Amun	Sheikh Abd el-Qurna	19th Dynasty – Ramesses II
TT107	Nefersekheru	Royal Scribe in the palace at Malkata	Sheikh Abd el-Qurna	18th Dynasty
TT108	Nebseni	High Priest of Onuris	Sheikh Abd el-Qurna	18th Dynasty – Thutmose IV
TT109	Min	Mayor of Tjeny (Thinis), Overseer of the prophets of Onuris, Tutor of Amenhotep II	Sheikh Abd el-Qurna	18th Dynasty – Thutmose III
TT110	Thutmose	Cupbearer of the King (Hatshepsut), First herald of the king (Thutmose III)	Sheikh Abd el-Qurna	18th Dynasty – Hatshepsut, Thutmose III
TT111	Amenwahsu	Scribe of God's Writings in the Amun Domain, Leader in the house of Amun, Wab-priest of Sekhmet, Festival leader of all the gods in their annual feasts.	Sheikh Abd el-Qurna	19th Dynasty – Ramesses II
TT112	Menkheperreseneb II, usurped by Ashefytemwaset	High Priest of Amun (priest of Amun-aashefyt) (Menkheperreseneb II)	Sheikh Abd el-Qurna	18th Dynasty – Thutmose III, Amenhotep II and 20th Dynasty
TT113	Kynebu	Priest in Temple for King Thutmose IV	Sheikh Abd el-Qurna	20th Dynasty – Ramesses VIII
TT114	Unknown	Head goldsmith of Amun	Sheikh Abd el-Qurna	20th Dynasty
TT115	Unknown		Sheikh Abd el-Qurna	20th Dynasty
TT116	Unknown	Crown prince	Sheikh Abd el-Qurna	18th Dynasty
TT117	Unknown, usurped by Djemutefankh	Draughtsman of Mansion of Gold (Djemutefankh)	Sheikh Abd el-Qurna	11th Dynasty, 21st Dynasty, and 22nd Dynasty
TT118	Amenmose	Fan-bearer on the Right Side of the King	Sheikh Abd el-Qurna	18th Dynasty – Amenhotep III?
TT119	Unknown		Sheikh Abd el-Qurna	18th Dynasty – Hatshepsut, Thutmose III
TT120	Anen	Second Priest of Amun, Brother of Queen Tiye	Sheikh Abd el-Qurna	18th Dynasty – Amenhotep III
TT121	Ahmose	First Lector priest of Amun	Sheikh Abd el-Qurna	18th Dynasty – Thutmose III
TT122	Amenemhat	Overseers of the Production Area of Amun	Sheikh Abd el-Qurna	18th Dynasty – Thutmose III
TT123	Amenemhat	Scribe, Overseer of the granary, Counter of bread	Sheikh Abd el-Qurna	18th Dynasty – Thutmose III
TT124	Ray	Overseer of the storerooms of Pharaoh, Steward of the good god Thutmose I	Sheikh Abd el-Qurna	18th Dynasty – Thutmose I
TT125	Duauneheh	First herald of the king, Overseer of the estate of Amun	Sheikh Abd el-Qurna	18th Dynasty – Hatshepsut
TT126	Hormose	Commander of Troops of the Amun domain	Sheikh Abd el-Qurna	26th Dynasty
TT127	Sememiah	Royal Scribe, Overseer of all that grows	Sheikh Abd el-Qurna	18th Dynasty – Hatshepsut
TT128	Pathenfy	Mayor of Edfu and Thebes	Sheikh Abd el-Qurna	26th Dynasty
TT129	Unknown		Sheikh Abd el-Qurna	18th Dynasty
TT130	May	Harbour Master in Thebes	Sheikh Abd el-Qurna	18th Dynasty – Thutmose III
TT131	Useramen	Vizier of the South	Sheikh Abd el-Qurna	18th Dynasty – Thutmose III
TT132	Ramose	Great Scribe of the king, Overseer of the treasuries of Taharqa	Sheikh Abd el-Qurna	25th Dynasty – Taharqa
TT133	Neferronpet	Chief of the weavers in the Ramesseum	Sheikh Abd el-Qurna	19th Dynasty – Ramesses II
TT134	Thauenany, also called Any	Priest of king Amenhotep who navigates on the sea of Amun	Sheikh Abd el-Qurna	19th Dynasty
TT135	Bakenamon	Wab-priest at the fore of Amun	Sheikh Abd el-Qurna	19th Dynasty
TT136	Unknown	Royal Scribe of the Lord of the Two Lands	Sheikh Abd el-Qurna	19th Dynasty
TT137	Mose	Head of works of Pharaoh in every monument of Amun	Sheikh Abd el-Qurna	19th Dynasty – Ramesses II
TT138	Nedjemger	Overseer of the garden in the Ramesseum	Sheikh Abd el-Qurna	19th Dynasty – Ramesses II
TT139	Pairi	Wab-priest in front of Amun, Overseer of peasants of Amun	Sheikh Abd el-Qurna	18th Dynasty – Amenhotep III
TT140	Kefia, also called Neferronpet	Goldworker, Portrait sculptor	Dra' Abu el-Naga	18th Dynasty
TT141	Bakenkhons	wab-priest at the fore of Amun	Dra' Abu el-Naga	20th Dynasty
TT142	Samut	Overseer of works of Amun-Ra in Karnak	Dra' Abu el-Naga	18th Dynasty – Thutmose III – Amenhotep II
TT143	Min		Dra' Abu el-Naga	18th Dynasty – Thutmose III – Amenhotep II
TT144	Nu	Overseer of estate labor	Dra' Abu el-Naga	18th Dynasty – Thutmose III
TT145	Nebamon	Head of bowmen	Dra' Abu el-Naga	18th Dynasty
TT146	Nebamon	Overseer of the granary of Amun, Counter of grain, and iny of the God's Wife	Dra' Abu el-Naga	18th Dynasty – Thutmose III
TT147	Heby and Neferrenpet	Scribe who counts the cattle of Amun (Heby); Head Elder of the portal in Karnak (Neferrenpet)	Dra' Abu el-Naga	18th Dynasty – Amenhotep III
TT148	Amenemopet	Priest of Amun	Dra' Abu el-Naga	20th Dynasty – Ramesses III – Ramesses IV
TT149	Amenmose	Royal Scribe of the table of the Lord of the Two Lands, Overseer of hunters of Amun	Dra' Abu el-Naga	20th Dynasty
TT150	Userhet	Overseer of cattle of Amun	Dra' Abu el-Naga	18th Dynasty
TT151	Hety	Steward of the God's Wife of Amun, Counter of cattle of the God's Wife of Amun	Dra' Abu el-Naga	18th Dynasty – Thutmose IV
TT152	Unknown		Dra' Abu el-Naga	18th Dynasty, usurped during the 20th Dynasty.
TT153	Unknown		Dra' Abu el-Naga	19th Dynasty – Seti I?
TT154	Tati	Cupbearer	Dra' Abu el-Naga	18th Dynasty
TT155	Intef	First herald of the King	Dra' Abu el-Naga	18th Dynasty – Hatshepsut, Thutmose III
TT156	Pennesuttawy	Captain of troops, Overseer of Upper Egypt	Dra' Abu el-Naga	19th Dynasty – Ramesses II
TT157	Nebwenenef	High Priest of Amun	Dra' Abu el-Naga	19th Dynasty – Ramesses II
TT158	Thonefer	Third prophet of Amun	Dra' Abu el-Naga	20th Dynasty
TT159	Raia	Fourth priest of Amun	Dra' Abu el-Naga	19th Dynasty
TT160	Besenmut	True king's acquaintance	Dra' Abu el-Naga	26th Dynasty
TT161	Nakht	Bearer of floral offerings of Amun	Dra' Abu el-Naga	18th Dynasty – Amenhotep III?
TT162	Kenamon	Mayor of Thebes, Overseer of the Granary of Amun	Dra' Abu el-Naga	18th Dynasty – Amenhotep III
TT163	Amenemhat	Mayor of Thebes, Royal Scribe	Dra' Abu el-Naga	19th Dynasty
TT164	Intef	Scribe of recruits	Dra' Abu el-Naga	18th Dynasty – Thutmose III
TT165	Nehemaway	Goldsmith	Dra' Abu el-Naga	18th Dynasty – Thutmose IV, Amenhotep III
TT166	Ramose	Overseer of cattle of Amun (Horemheb), Overseer of works in Karnak (Seti I)	Dra' Abu el-Naga	18th Dynasty – Horemheb/19th Dynasty – Seti I
TT167	Unknown		Dra' Abu el-Naga	18th Dynasty
TT168	Any	Divine Father clean of hands, Chosen lector of the lord of the gods	Dra' Abu el-Naga	19th Dynasty – Ramesses II
TT169	Senena	Head goldsmith of Amun	Dra' Abu el-Naga	18th Dynasty – Amenhotep III
TT170	Nebmehyt	Scribe of recruits of the Ramesseum in the estate of Amun	Sheikh Abd el-Qurna	19th Dynasty – Ramesses II
TT171	Unknown		Sheikh Abd el-Qurna	18th Dynasty
TT172	Mentiywi	Royal Butler, child of the nursery	El-Khokha	18th Dynasty – Thutmose III – Amenhotep II
TT173	Khay	Scribe of divine offerings of the gods of Thebes	El-Khokha	19th Dynasty
TT174	Ashakhet	Priest in front of Mut	El-Khokha	19th Dynasty
TT175	Unknown		El-Khokha	18th Dynasty
TT176	Userhet	Servant of Amun, clean of hands	El-Khokha	18th Dynasty – Amenhotep II, Thutmose IV
TT177	Amenemopet	Scribe of Truth in the Ramesseum in the estate of Amun	El-Khokha	19th Dynasty – Ramesses II
TT178	Kenro, also called Neferrenpet	Scribe of the treasury in the Amun-Ra domain	El-Khokha	19th Dynasty – Ramesses II
TT179	Nebamon	Scribe, Counter of grain in the granary of divine offerings of Amun	El-Khokha	18th Dynasty – Hatshepsut
TT180	Unknown		El-Khokha	19th Dynasty
TT181	Ipuki and Nebamon	Sculptor of Pharaoh (Ipuki); Head sculptor of Pharaoh (Nebamon)	El-Khokha	18th Dynasty
TT182	Amenemhat	Scribe of the mat	El-Khokha	18th Dynasty – Thutmose III
TT183	Nebsumenu	Chief steward, Steward in the Ramesseum	El-Khokha	19th Dynasty – Ramesses II
TT184	Nefermenu	Mayor of Thebes, Royal Scribe	El-Khokha	19th Dynasty – Ramesses II
TT185	Senioker	Treasurer of the God, Hereditary Prince, Divine Chancellor	El-Khokha	First Intermediate Period
TT186	Ihy	Nomarch	El-Khokha	First Intermediate Period
TT187	Pakhihet	wab-priest of Amun	El-Khokha	20th Dynasty
TT188	Parennefer	Royal butler clean of hands, Steward	El-Khokha	18th Dynasty – Akhenaten
TT189	Nakhtdjehuty	Chief of carpenters and Goldworkers in the Amun domain	El-Assasif	19th Dynasty – Ramesses II
TT190	Esbanebded	Divine Father, Prophet at the head of the king	El-Assasif	26th Dynasty
TT191	Wahibrenebpehti	Chamberlain of the Divine Adoratrice of Amun, Director of the festival	El-Assasif	26th Dynasty – Psamtik I
TT192	Kharuef, also called Senaa	Steward to the Great Royal Wife Tiye	El-Assasif	18th Dynasty – Amenhotep III
TT193	Ptahemheb	Official of the seal in the treasury of the Amun domain	El-Assasif	19th Dynasty
TT194	Tutemheb	Overseer of marshland-dwellers in the Amun domain, Scribe in the temple of Amun	El-Assasif	19th Dynasty – Ramesses II
TT195	Bakenamon	Scribe of the treasure of the Amun domain	El-Assasif	19th Dynasty
TT196	Padihorresnet	Chief steward of Amun	El-Assasif	26th Dynasty
TT197	Padineith	Chief steward of the God's Wife of Amun	El-Assasif	26th Dynasty – Psamtik II
TT198	Riya	Head of the magazine of Amun in Karnak	El-Khokha	20th Dynasty
TT199	Amenarnefru	Overseer of the store-rooms	El-Khokha	18th Dynasty
TT200	Dedi	Governor of the deserts to the west of Thebes (Thutmose III), Head of the troops of Pharaoh (Amenhotep II)	El-Khokha	18th Dynasty – Thutmose III – Amenhotep II

== TT201–TT300 ==
Designation	Owner(s)	Title(s)	Location	Dynasty(s)
TT201	Re	First herald of the king	El-Khokha	18th Dynasty
TT202	Nakhtamun	Prophet of Ptah Lord of Thebes, Priest in front of Amun	El-Khokha	19th Dynasty
TT203	Wennefer	Divine father of Mut	El-Khokha	19th Dynasty – Ramesses II
TT204	Nebanensu	Sailor of the High Priest of Amun	El-Khokha	18th Dynasty
TT205	Thutmose	Royal butler	El-Khokha	18th Dynasty
TT206	Ipuemheb	Scribe of the Place of Truth	El-Khokha	20th Dynasty
TT207	Horemheb	Scribe of divine offerings of Amun	El-Khokha	20th Dynasty
TT208	Roma	Divine father of Amun-Ra	El-Khokha	20th Dynasty
TT209	Nisemro	Overseer of the stamp	South Asasif	25th Dynasty
TT210	Raweben	Servant in the Place of Truth	Deir el-Medina	19th Dynasty – Ramesses II
TT211	Paneb	Servant in the Place of Truth	Deir el-Medina	19th Dynasty – Ramesses II
TT212	Ramose	Scribe of the Place of Truth	Deir el-Medina	19th Dynasty – Ramesses II
TT213	Penamun	Servant in the Place of Truth	Deir el-Medina	19th Dynasty – Ramesses II
TT214	Khawy	Custodian in the Place of Truth, Servant of Amun in Thebes	Deir el-Medina	19th Dynasty – Ramesses II
TT215	Amenemopet	Royal Scribe in the Place of Truth	Deir el-Medina	19th Dynasty – Ramesses II
TT216	Neferhotep	Foreman in the Place of Truth	Deir el-Medina	19th Dynasty – Ramesses II
TT217	Ipuy	Sculptor	Deir el-Medina	19th Dynasty – Ramesses II
TT218	Amennakht	Servant in the Place of Truth	Deir el-Medina	19th Dynasty – Ramesses II
TT219	Nebenmaat	Servant in the Place of Truth	Deir el-Medina	19th Dynasty – Ramesses II
TT220	Khaemteri	Servant in the Place of Truth	Deir el-Medina	19th Dynasty – Ramesses II
TT221	Horimin	Scribe of troops in the palace of the king on the West of Thebes	Qurnet Murai	20th Dynasty – Ramesses III
TT222	Hekammatranakhte	High priest of Montu	Qurnet Murai	20th Dynasty
TT223	Karakhamon		Qurnet Murai	26th Dynasty
TT224	Ahmose, also called Humay	Overseer of the estate of the God's Wife, Overseer of the double granaries of the God's Wife Ahmose-Nefertari	Sheikh Abd el-Qurna	18th Dynasty – Thutmose III – Hatshepsut
TT225	Unknown (possibly Amenemhet)	First prophet of Hathor	Sheikh Abd el-Qurna	18th Dynasty
TT226	Heqareshu	Royal Scribe, Overseer of nurses of the king	Sheikh Abd el-Qurna	18th Dynasty – Amenhotep III
TT227	Unknown (Brother of Hapuseneb)		Sheikh Abd el-Qurna	18th Dynasty – Thutmose III
TT228	Amenmose	Scribe of the Amun treasury	Sheikh Abd el-Qurna	18th Dynasty – Thutmose III
TT229	Unknown		Sheikh Abd el-Qurna	18th Dynasty
TT230	Men	Scribe of troops of Pharaoh	Sheikh Abd el-Qurna	18th Dynasty
TT231	Nebamun	Scribe, Counter of grain of Amun in the granary of divine offerings	Dra' Abu el-Naga	18th Dynasty
TT232	Tharwas	Scribe of the divine seal of the Amun treasury	Dra' Abu el-Naga	20th Dynasty
TT233	Saroy and Amenhotep		Dra' Abu el-Naga	20th Dynasty
TT234	Roy	Mayor	Dra' Abu el-Naga	18th Dynasty – Thutmose III
TT235	Userhet	High priest of Montu	Qurnet Murai	20th Dynasty
TT236	Hornakht	Second Prophet of Amun, Overseer of the treasuries of Amun	Dra' Abu el-Naga	20th Dynasty
TT237	Wennefer	Chief Lector priest	Dra' Abu el-Naga	20th Dynasty
TT238	Neferweben	Royal butler clean of hands	El-Khokha	18th Dynasty
TT239	Penhet	Overseer for all the Northern Lands	Dra' Abu el-Naga	18th Dynasty
TT240 (MMA 517)	Meru	Overseer of sealers	El-Assasif	11th Dynasty – Mentuhotep II
TT241	Ahmose	Scribe of divine writings, Child of the nursery, Head of the mysteries in the House of the morning	Dra' Abu el-Naga	18th Dynasty
TT242	Wehibre	Chamberlain of the God's Wife of Amun	El-Assasif	26th Dynasty
TT243	Pemu called Pahy	Mayor of Thebes	El-Assasif	26th Dynasty
TT244	Pakharu	Overseer of carpenters of the Amun domain	El-Assasif	20th Dynasty
TT245	Hori	Scribe, Overseer of the estate of the great wife of the king	El-Khokha	18th Dynasty
TT246	Senenre	Scribe	El-Khokha	18th Dynasty
TT247	Samut	Scribe, Counter of cattle of Amun	El-Khokha	18th Dynasty
TT248	Thutmose	Maker of offerings of Thutmose III	El-Khokha	18th Dynasty
TT249	Neferronpet	Supplier of dates/cakes in the temple of Amenhotep III	Sheikh Abd el-Qurna	18th Dynasty
TT250	Ramose	Scribe of the Place of Truth	Deir el-Medina	19th Dynasty – Ramesses II
TT251	Amenmose	Overseer of cattle, Royal Scribe, Overseer of magazine of Amun	Sheikh Abd el-Qurna	18th Dynasty
TT252	Senimen	Steward, Nurse of the God's Wife	Sheikh Abd el-Qurna	18th Dynasty – Hatshepsut
TT253	Khnummose	Scribe, Counter of grain in the granary of Amun	El-Khokha	18th Dynasty – Amenhotep III
TT254	Mose (Amenmose)	Scribe of the treasury, Custodian of the estate of queen Tiye in the Amun domain	El-Khokha	18th Dynasty (late)
TT255	Roy	Royal Scribe, Steward of the estates of Horemheb and Amun	Dra' Abu el-Naga	18th Dynasty – Horemheb
TT256	Nebenkemet	Overseer of the cabinet, Fanbearer, Child of the nursery	El-Khokha	18th Dynasty – Amenhotep II
TT257	Neferhotep, usurped by Mahu	Deputy in the Ramesseum (Mahu)	El-Khokha	18th Dynasty – Thutmose III – Amenhotep III and 19th Dynasty – Ramesses II
TT258	Menkheper	Child of the nursery, Royal Scribe of the house of the royal children	El-Khokha	18th Dynasty – Thutmose IV
TT259	Hori	Scribe in all the monuments of the estate of Amun, Head of the outline-draughtsmen in the Gold House of the Amun domain	Sheikh Abd el-Qurna	20th Dynasty
TT260	User	Overseer of fields, Scribe, Weigher of Amun	Dra' Abu el-Naga	18th Dynasty – Thutmose III
TT261	Khaemwaset	Wab-priest of king Amenhotep I	Dra' Abu el-Naga	18th Dynasty – Thutmose III – Amenhotep II
TT262	Unknown	Overseer of fields	Dra' Abu el-Naga	18th Dynasty
TT263	Piay	Scribe in the granary in the Amun domain, Scribe of accounts in the Ramesseum	Sheikh Abd el-Qurna	19th Dynasty – Ramesses II
TT264	Ipiy	Overseer of cattle, Chief of the Lord of the Two Lands	El-Khokha	19th Dynasty – Ramesses II – Merneptah
TT265	Amenemopet	Royal Scribe of the Place of Truth	Deir el-Medina	19th Dynasty – Seti I – Ramesses II
TT266	Amenakhte	Chief craftsman of the Lord of the Two Lands in the Place of Truth on the west of Thebes	Deir el-Medina	19th Dynasty
TT267	Hay	Officer of workmen in the Place of Truth, Fashioner of the images of all the gods in the House of Gold	Deir el-Medina	20th Dynasty
TT268	Nebnakhte	Servant in the Place of Truth	Deir el-Medina	19th Dynasty
TT269	Unknown		Sheikh Abd el-Qurna	20th Dynasty
TT270	Amonemuia	Wab-priest,Lector priest of Ptah-Sokar	Qurnet Murai	19th Dynasty
TT271	Nay	Royal Scribe	Qurnet Murai	18th Dynasty – Ay
TT272	Khaemopet	Divine father of Amun in the west, Lector priest of the Sokar temple	Qurnet Murai	20th Dynasty
TT273	Sayemiotf	Scribe in the estate of his lord	Qurnet Murai	20th Dynasty
TT274	Amenwahsu	High priest of Montu of Tod and of Thebes, sem-priest in the Ramesseum in the estate of Amun	Qurnet Murai	19th Dynasty – Ramesses II – Merneptah
TT275	Sebekmose	Head wab-priest, Divine Father in the temples of king Amenhotep III and Sokar	Qurnet Murai	20th Dynasty
TT276	Amenemopet	Overseer of the treasuries of gold and silver, Judge, Overseer of the cabinet	Qurnet Murai	18th Dynasty – Thutmose IV
TT277	Amenemonet	Divine father of the temple of king Amenhotep III	Qurnet Murai	19th Dynasty
TT278	Amenemheb	Herdsman of Amun-Ra	Qurnet Murai	20th Dynasty
TT279	Pabasa	Chief steward to the Nitocris I, Divine Adoratrice of Amun	El-Assasif	26th Dynasty – Psamtik I
TT280 (MMA 1101)	Meketre	Chief steward, Chancellor	Sheikh Abd el-Qurna	11th Dynasty – Mentuhotep II – Mentuhotep III
TT281	Mentuhotep III?	Pharaoh	Sheikh Abd el-Qurna	11th Dynasty
TT282	Nakhtmin	Head of the bowmen, Overseer of Upper Egypt	Dra' Abu el-Naga	19th Dynasty – Ramesses II
TT283	Roma, also called Roy	High Priest of Amun	Dra' Abu el-Naga	19th Dynasty – Ramesses II – Merneptah
TT284	Pahemnetjer	Scribe of offerings of all gods	Dra' Abu el-Naga	20th Dynasty
TT285	Iny	Head of the magazines of Mut	Dra' Abu el-Naga	20th Dynasty
TT286	Niay	Scribe of the table	Dra' Abu el-Naga	20th Dynasty
TT287	Pendua	Wab-priest of Amun,	Dra' Abu el-Naga	20th Dynasty
TT288	Bakenkhons	Scribe of divine book of Khons	Dra' Abu el-Naga	20th Dynasty
TT289	Setau	Viceroy of Kush, Overseer of Upper Egypt, Chief Bowman of Kush	Dra' Abu el-Naga	19th Dynasty – Ramesses II
TT290	Irinufer	Servant in the Place of Truth	Deir el-Medina	19th Dynasty – Ramesses II
TT291	Nakhtmin and Nu	Servant in the Place of Truth, servant in the Great Place (Nakhtmin)	Deir el-Medina	18th Dynasty – Horemheb
TT292	Pashedu	Servant in the Place of Truth	Deir el-Medina	19th Dynasty – Seti I – Ramesses II
TT293	Ramessenakhte	High Priest of Amun	Dra' Abu el-Naga	20th Dynasty – Ramesses IV
TT294	Amenhotep, usurped by Roma	Overseer of the granary of Amun (Amenhotep); Wab priest of Amun (Roma)	El-Khokha	18th Dynasty – Amenhotep III
TT295	Paroy, also called Tuthmose	Head of the secrets in the Chest of Anubis, sem-priest in the Good House, Embalmer	El-Khokha	18th Dynasty – Thutmose IV – Amenhotep III (?)
TT296	Nefersekheru	Scribe of divine offerings of all gods, Officer of the treasury	El-Khokha	19th Dynasty – Ramesses II
TT297	Amenemopet	Overseer of fields, Scribe, Counter of grain of Amun	El-Assasif	18th Dynasty
TT298	Baki and Wennefer	Foreman in the Place of Truth (Baki); Servant in the Place of Truth (Wennefer)	Deir el-Medina	20th Dynasty
TT299	Inherkau	Foreman in the Place of Truth	Deir el-Medina	20th Dynasty – Ramesses III – Ramesses IV
TT300	Anhotep	Viceroy of Kush	Dra' Abu el-Naga	19th Dynasty – Ramesses II

== TT301–TT400 ==
Designation	Owner(s)	Title(s)	Location	Dynasty(s)
TT301	Hori	Scribe of the table of Pharaoh in the Amun domain	Dra' Abu el-Naga	20th Dynasty
TT302	Paraemheb	Overseer of the magazine	Dra' Abu el-Naga	20th Dynasty
TT303	Paser	Head of the magazine of Amun, Third Prophet of Amun	Dra' Abu el-Naga	20th Dynasty
TT304	Piay	Scribe of the offering-table of Amun, Scribe of the Lord of the Two Lands	Dra' Abu el-Naga	20th Dynasty
TT305	Paser	wab-priest in front of Amun	Dra' Abu el-Naga	20th Dynasty
TT306	Irdjanen	Door-opener of the Amun domain	Dra' Abu el-Naga	20th Dynasty
TT307	Thonefer		Dra' Abu el-Naga	20th Dynasty or 21st Dynasty
TT308	Kemsit	Sole adornment of the king, Priestess of Hathor	Deir el-Bahari	11th Dynasty – Mentuhotep II
TT309	Unknown		Sheikh Abd el-Qurna	20th Dynasty
TT310 (MMA 505)	Unknown	Treasurer of the King of Lower Egypt	Deir el-Bahari	11th Dynasty
TT311 (MMA 508)	Kheti	Treasurer of the King of Lower Egypt	Deir el-Bahari	11th Dynasty – Mentuhotep II
TT312 (MMA 509)	Nespaqashuty D	Mayor of the town, Vizier of the South	Deir el-Bahari	26th Dynasty – Psamtik I
TT313 (MMA 510)	Henenu	High steward	Deir el-Bahari	11th Dynasty – Mentuhotep II – Mentuhotep III
TT314 (MMA 513)	Horhotep	Seal-bearer of the King of Lower Egypt	Deir el-Bahari	11th Dynasty
TT315 (MMA 516)	Ipi	Mayor of the town, Vizier, Judge	Deir el-Bahari	11th Dynasty – Mentuhotep II
TT316 (MMA 518)	Neferhotep	Head of the archers	Deir el-Bahari	early Middle Kingdom
TT317	Tutnefer	Scribe of the counting of corn in the granary of divine offerings of Amun	Sheikh Abd el-Qurna	18th Dynasty – Thutmose III (?)
TT318	Amenmose	Necropolis-worker of Amun	Sheikh Abd el-Qurna	18th Dynasty – Thutmose III – Hatshepsut
TT319 (MMA 31)	Neferu II	King's Wife of Mentuhotep II	Deir el-Bahari	11th Dynasty – Mentuhotep II
TT320	Deir el-Bahari Cache	Various	Deir el-Bahari	21st Dynasty; reburials from various periods
TT321	Khaemopet	Servant in the Place of Truth	Deir el-Medina	19th Dynasty – Ramesses II
TT322	Penshenabu	Servant in the Place of Truth	Deir el-Medina	19th Dynasty – Ramesses II
TT323	Pashedu	Outline-draughtsman in the Place of Truth and in the Temple of Sokar	Deir el-Medina	19th Dynasty – Seti I
TT324	Hatiay	Overseer of all the prophets of all the gods, High priest of Sobek	Sheikh Abd el-Qurna	20th Dynasty
TT325	Smen		Deir el-Medina	18th Dynasty
TT326	Pashedu	Servant in the Place of Truth	Deir el-Medina	19th Dynasty – Ramesses II
TT327	Turobay	Servant in the Place of Truth	Deir el-Medina	19th Dynasty – Ramesses II
TT328	Hay	Servant in the Place of Truth	Deir el-Medina	20th Dynasty
TT329	Mose and Ipy	A family tomb of Servants in the Place of Truth	Deir el-Medina	20th Dynasty
TT330	Karo	Servant in the Place of Truth	Deir el-Medina	19th Dynasty – Ramesses II
TT331	Penne, also called Sunero	High priest of Montu	Sheikh Abd el-Qurna	19th Dynasty – Ramesses II
TT332	Penrenutet	Chief watchman of the granary of the Amun domain	Dra' Abu el-Naga	20th Dynasty
TT333	Unknown		Dra' Abu el-Naga	18th Dynasty – Amenhotep III
TT334	Unknown	Head of the farmers	Dra' Abu el-Naga	18th Dynasty – Amenhotep III
TT335	Nakhtamun	Servant in the Place of Truth	Deir el-Medina	19th Dynasty – Ramesses II – Merneptah
TT336	Neferronpet	Servant in the Place of Truth	Deir el-Medina	19th Dynasty – Ramesses II – Merneptah
TT337	Eskhons or Ken	Sculptor in the Place of Truth	Deir el-Medina	19th Dynasty – Ramesses II
TT338	May	Draughtsman of Amun	Deir el-Medina	18th Dynasty – Akhenaten
TT339	Huy or Pashedu	Necropolis-stonemason, Servant in the Place of Truth	Deir el-Medina	20th Dynasty
TT340	Amenemhat	Servant	Deir el-Medina	18th Dynasty
TT341	Nakhtamun	Chief of the Altar in the Ramesseum	Sheikh Abd el-Qurna	19th Dynasty
TT342	Thutmose	First herald of the king	Sheikh Abd el-Qurna	18th Dynasty – Thutmose III
TT343	Paheqamen (or Pahekamen), also called Benia	Child of the Royal Nursery, Overseer of Works	Sheikh Abd el-Qurna	18th Dynasty
TT344	Piay	Overseer of cattle	Dra' Abu el-Naga	20th Dynasty
TT345	Amenhotep	Priest, Eldest King's Son of Thutmose I	Sheikh Abd el-Qurna	18th Dynasty – Thutmose I
TT346	Penra, usurped by Amenhotep	Overseer of the Women of the Inner Palace Quarters for the Divine Adoratrix (Amenhotep); Chief of the Medjay (Penra)	Sheikh Abd el-Qurna	19th Dynasty – Ramesses II and 20th Dynasty – Ramesses IV
TT347	Hori	Scribe	Sheikh Abd el-Qurna	20th Dynasty
TT348	Na'amutnakht	Door-opener of the Gold House of Amun, Chief gardener of the Ramesseum	Sheikh Abd el-Qurna	22nd Dynasty
TT349	Tjay	Overseer of Fowlpens	Sheikh Abd el-Qurna	18th Dynasty
TT350	Unknown	Scribe	Sheikh Abd el-Qurna	18th Dynasty
TT351	Abau	Scribe of Cavalry	Sheikh Abd el-Qurna	20th Dynasty
TT352	Unknown	Overseer of the Granary of Amun	Sheikh Abd el-Qurna	20th Dynasty
TT353	Senenmut	High steward	Deir el-Bahari	18th Dynasty – Hatshepsut
TT354	Unknown (possibly Amenemhat of TT340)		Deir el-Medina	18th Dynasty
TT355	Amenpahapy	Servant in the Place of Truth	Deir el-Medina	20th Dynasty
TT356	Amenemwia	Servant in the Place of Truth	Deir el-Medina	19th Dynasty
TT357	Tutihermaktuf	Servant in the Place of Truth	Deir el-Medina	20th Dynasty
TT358 (MMA 65)	Ahmose-Meritamun	Wife of Amenhotep I	Deir el-Bahari	18th Dynasty – Amenhotep I
TT359	Inherkhau	Foreman in the Place of Truth	Deir el-Medina	20th Dynasty – Ramesses III – Ramesses IV
TT360	Qeh	Foreman in the Place of Truth	Deir el-Medina	19th Dynasty
TT361	Huy	Carpenter in the Place of Truth	Deir el-Medina	19th Dynasty
TT362	Paanemwaset	Priest of Amun	El-Khokha	19th Dynasty
TT363	Paraemheb	Overseer of Singers of Amun	El-Khokha	19th Dynasty
TT364	Amenemheb	Scribe of the Divine Offerings	El-Assasif	19th Dynasty
TT365	Nefermenu	Overseer of Wig-Makers of Amun in Karnak, Scribe of the Treasury of Amun	El-Khokha	18th Dynasty – Thutmose III
TT366 (MMA 820)	Djar	King's Guard of the Inner Palace	El-Assasif	11th Dynasty
TT367	Paser	Head of the Bowmen, Child of the Royal Nursery, Companion of His Majesty	Sheikh Abd el-Qurna	18th Dynasty – Amenhotep II
TT368	Amenhotep, called Huy	Overseer of Sculptors of Amun in Thebes	Sheikh Abd el-Qurna	18th Dynasty
TT369	Khaemwaset	High priest of Ptah, Third priest of Amun	El-Khokha	19th Dynasty
TT370	Unknown	Royal Scribe	El-Khokha	20th Dynasty
TT371	Unknown		El-Khokha	20th Dynasty
TT372	Amenkhau	Overseer of Carpenters of the Temple of Ramesses III	El-Khokha	20th Dynasty
TT373	Amenmessu	Scribe of the Altar of the Lord of the Two Lands	El-Khokha	20th Dynasty
TT374	Amenemopet	Treasury Scribe in the Ramesseum	El-Khokha	19th Dynasty
TT375	Unknown		Dra' Abu el-Naga	20th Dynasty
TT376	Unknown		Dra' Abu el-Naga	18th Dynasty
TT377	Unknown		Dra' Abu el-Naga	20th Dynasty
TT378	Unknown		Dra' Abu el-Naga	19th Dynasty
TT379	Unknown		Dra' Abu el-Naga	20th Dynasty
TT380	Ankefenrahorakhty	Chief in Thebes	Qurnet Murai	Ptolemaic Period
TT381	Amenemonet	Messenger of the King to Every Land	Qurnet Murai	20th Dynasty
TT382	Usermontu	High priest of Montu	Qurnet Murai	19th Dynasty – Ramesses II
TT383	Merymose	Viceroy of Kush	Qurnet Murai	18th Dynasty – Amenhotep III
TT384	Nebmehyt	Priest of Amun in the Ramesseum	Sheikh Abd el-Qurna	19th Dynasty
TT385	Hunefer	Mayor of Thebes, Overseer of the granary of Divine Offerings of Amun	Sheikh Abd el-Qurna	19th Dynasty – Ramesses II
TT386	Intef	Treasurer of the King of Lower Egypt, Overseer of Troops	El-Assasif	11th Dynasty – Mentuhotep II
TT387	Meryptah	Royal Scribe of the Altar of the Lord of the Two Lands,	El-Assasif	19th Dynasty – Ramesses II
TT388	Unknown		El-Assasif	26th Dynasty
TT389	Basa	Chamberlain of Min, Priest, Mayor of Thebes	El-Assasif	26th Dynasty
TT390	Irtyrau	Female Scribe, Chief attendant of the Divine Adoratrice of Amun, Nitocris I	El-Assasif	26th Dynasty – Psamtik I
TT391	Karabasken, usurped by Pedubast	Fourth prophet of Amun, Mayor of the City (Karabasken); High steward (Pedubast)	El-Assasif	25th Dynasty – Piye – Shabaka and 26th Dynasty
TT392	Unknown		El-Khokha	26th Dynasty
TT393	Unknown		Dra' Abu el-Naga	18th Dynasty
TT394	Unknown		Dra' Abu el-Naga	20th Dynasty
TT395	Unknown		Dra' Abu el-Naga	20th Dynasty
TT396	Unknown		Dra' Abu el-Naga	18th Dynasty
TT397	Nakht	Priest of Amun, Overseer of the Magazine of Amun, First king's Son of Amun	Sheikh Abd el-Qurna	18th Dynasty
TT398	Kamose called Nentowaref	Child of the Royal Nursery	Sheikh Abd el-Qurna	18th Dynasty?
TT399	Unknown		Sheikh Abd el-Qurna	20th Dynasty
TT399A	Penrennu		Sheikh Abd el-Qurna	20th Dynasty
TT400	Scribe of the Treasury, Prophet of Maat	Sheikh Abd el-Qurna	19th Dynasty	

== TT401–TT417 ==
Designation	Owner(s)	Title(s)	Location	Dynasty(s)
TT401	Nebseni	Overseer of goldsmiths of Amun	Dra' Abu el-Naga	18th Dynasty– Thutmose III – Amenhotep II
TT402	Unknown		Dra' Abu el-Naga	18th Dynasty– Thutmose IV – Amenhotep III
TT403	Merymaat	Temple Scribe	Sheikh Abd el-Qurna	18th Dynasty? 20th Dynasty?
TT404	Akhamenerau	Chief steward of the Divine Adoratrice of Amun, Amenirdis I, and Shepenupet II	El-Assasif	25th Dynasty
TT405	Khenti	Nomarch	El-Khokha	First Intermediate Period
TT406	Piay	Scribe of the Altar of the Lord of the Two Lands	El-Assasif	20th Dynasty
TT407	Bentenduanetjer	Chamberlain of the Divine Adoratrice of Amun	El-Assasif	26th Dynasty
TT408	Bakenamon	Head of Estate-Workers of the Amun domain	El-Assasif	20th Dynasty
TT409	Samut, also called Kiki	Accountant of Cattle of the Amun domain	El-Assasif	19th Dynasty – Ramesses II
TT410	Mutirdis	Chief follower of the God's Priestess	El-Assasif	26th Dynasty – Psamtik I
TT411	Psamtek	Unknown	El-Assasif	26th Dynasty
TT412	Kenamon	Royal Scribe	El-Assasif	18th Dynasty – Thutmose III – Amenhotep III
TT413	Unasankh	Overseer of Upper Egypt	El-Assasif	6th Dynasty
TT414	Ankhhor	Mayor of Memphis	El-Assasif	26th Dynasty – Psamtik II – Apries
TT415	Amenhotep	Chief physician of Amun	El-Assasif	19th Dynasty
TT416	Amenhotep called Rabouya	Gatekeeper of god Amun in Karnak	El-Khokha	18th Dynasty – Thutmosis III
TT417	Samut		El-Khokha	18th Dynasty – Thutmosis IV

== Other tombs ==
=== Uncategorized ===
- Bab el-Gasus

=== Unknown location ===
Designation	Owner(s)	Title(s)	Location	Period
Tomb of Nebamun	Nebamun	Scribe, counter of grain	Possibly Dra' Abu el-Naga	New Kingdom

=== Dra' Abu el-Naga ===
Designation	Owner(s)	Title(s)	Dynasty(s)
Tomb ANB	Possibly Amenhotep I and Ahmose-Nefertari		18th Dynasty
Tomb A.1	Amenemhet	ka-servant	18th Dynasty
Tomb A.2	"Tomb of the Dancers"		17th Dynasty(?)
Tomb A.3	Ruru	Chief of the Medjay	New Kingdom
Tomb A.4	Si-User	Scribe, Mayor of the Southern City, Overseer of the Granary	19th Dynasty
Tomb A.5	Neferhotep	Overseer of granaries	18th Dynasty – Thutmose III – Amenhotep II
Tomb A.6	Djehutinefer	Overseer of marshlands of the Lord of the Two Lands	18th Dynasty
Tomb A.7	Amenhotep	Scribe	18th Dynasty
Tomb A.8	Amenemhab	Royal Scribe, Steward in the Mansion of Amenhotep I on the West of Thebes	18th Dynasty or 19th Dynasty
Tomb A.9	Unknown		18th Dynasty – Amenhotep II
Tomb A.10	Djehutynefer	Overseer of the treasuries	Early 18th Dynasty
Tomb A.11	Amenkhaemwaset		New Kingdom
Tomb A.12	Nebwenenef	Superintendent of the inhabitants of the marshlands of the domain of Amun	19th Dynasty – 20th Dynasty
Tomb A.13	Paimosi	Guardian of the gift warehouse; Servant of the King in foreign lands	18th Dynasty
Tomb A.14	Unknown		19th Dynasty
Tomb A.15	Amenemib	Chief of the gatekeepers of the domain of Amun	19th Dynasty
Tomb A.16	Djehutihotep	Favored among the royal Scribes; Administrator of the Southern City.	19th Dynasty – 20th Dynasty
Tomb A.17	Userhat	Head of accountants in the granary of Amun	Unknown
Tomb A.18	Amenemope	Prophet of Amun-Ra, Secretary and Chief of the Scribes in the domain of Amun	19th Dynasty – 20th Dynasty
Tomb A.19	Unknown	Overseer of the Prophets of Onuris. Trusted friend of the Lord of the Two Lands.	Unknown
Tomb A.20	Nakht or Panakht	Superintendent of the granary of Amun	18th Dynasty
Tomb A.21	Unknown		Unknown
Tomb A.22	Neferhabef	Grain accounting Scribe	Unknown
Tomb A.23	Penashefi	Divine father of Amun, Mut, and Amun-Ra, Great Scribe of letters, Overseer of the treasuries	19th Dynasty – 20th Dynasty
Tomb A.24	Simut	Second Prophet of Amun	18th Dynasty – Amenhotep III
Tomb A.25	Unused		18th Dynasty
Tomb A.26	Unknown		19th Dynasty – 20th Dynasty
Tomb A.27	Say	Scribe at the king's altar	New Kingdom
Tomb A.28	Nakht		19th Dynasty – 20th Dynasty

=== El-Khokha ===
Designation	Owner(s)	Title(s)	Dynasty(s)
Tomb B.1	Mehehy	Priest of Amun	20th Dynasty
Tomb B.2	Amenneferu	Priest at the fore	mid 18th Dynasty
Tomb B.3	Hauf		Late Period
Tomb B.4 (TT41)	Amenemopet called Ipy	Chief steward of Amun in Thebes	19th Dynasty – Ramesses I – Ramesses II
Tomb B.5 (TT386)	Intef	Treasurer of the King of Lower Egypt, Overseer of Troops	11th Dynasty – Mentuhotep II

=== Sheikh Abd el-Qurna ===
Designation	Owner(s)	Title(s)	Dynasty(s)
Tomb C.1	Amenhotep	Overseer of carpenters of Amun	18th Dynasty – Amenhotep III
Tomb C.2	Amenemhat	Noble at the head of the People	18th Dynasty – Ahmose I – Amenhotep I
Tomb C.3	Amenhotep	High Priest of Amun	18th Dynasty – Amenhotep I – Thutmose III
Tomb C.4	Merymaat	wab-priest of Maat	Late 18th Dynasty
Tomb C.5	Unknown		Late 18th Dynasty?
Tomb C.6	Ipy	Overseer of boats in the temple of king Thutmose IV	18th Dynasty – Thutmose IV
Tomb C.7	Hormose	Head guard of the treasury in the Ramesseum	19th Dynasty – Ramesses II
Tomb C.8	Nakht	Overseer of the fowl-houses in the Estate of Amun	New Kingdom
Tomb C.9	Unknown		Unknown
Tomb C.10	Penrenenu	Scribe of the offering-table	18th Dynasty
Tomb C.11	Nebseny	Overseer of goldsmiths of Amun, Overseer of all works silver and gold	18th Dynasty – Thutmose III
Tomb C.12	Mahu	Overseer of the gate	Unknown
Tomb C.14	Ankhefenthut called Neferibre-seneb		26th Dynasty
Tomb C.15	Unknown	Overseer of the two houses of gold, Overseer of the two houses of silver	18th Dynasty
Sheikh Abd el-Qurna cache	royal princesses	King's daughters	18th Dynasty

=== Qurnet Murai ===
Designation	Owner(s)	Title(s)	Dynasty(s)
Tomb D.1	Nehi	Viceroy of Kush, Overseer of Upper Egypt	18th Dynasty – Thutmose III
Tomb D.2	Peterssuemhebsed		New Kingdom?
Tomb D.3	Amenemhab called Mahu	Steward of [...]	18th Dynasty – Thutmose III

=== MMA Tombs ===
Designation	Owner(s)	Title(s)	Location	Dynasty(s)
MMA 31 (TT319)	Neferu II	King's Wife of Mentuhotep II	Deir el-Bahari	11th Dynasty – Mentuhotep II
MMA 56	Ankhshepenwepet	Singer in the Residence of Amun	Deir el-Bahari	25th Dynasty
MMA 57	Khamhor	High Priest of Amun, Mayor of Thebes	Deir el-Bahari	26th Dynasty
MMA 59	Hennutawy F	Chantress of Amun	Deir el-Bahari	21st Dynasty
MMA 60	Multiple (Note: People buried in this tomb include: Djedmutesankh A. Chief of the Harem of Amun.; Henuttawy B, Daughter of Pinedjem I and Duathathor-Henuttawy; Henuttawy C, Chief of the Harem of Amun, Flutist of Mut, and God's Mother of Khonsu, probably a daughter of the High Priest of Amun Menkheperre and of Isetemkheb C; Menkheperre C, God's Father, Priest of Amun-Ra, son of Fai-en-Mut, grandson of Piankh; Ankhesmut; Tabeketmut; Nesenaset, Chantress of Amun; Tiye, Chantress of Amun; Gautsoshen A, Chief of the Harem of Montu. Buried in Pit 4. Daughter of the High Priest Menkheperre and wife of Tjanefer A.)		Deir el-Bahari	18th Dynasty – 21st Dynasty
MMA 65 (TT358)	Ahmose-Meritamun	Wife of Amenhotep I	Deir el-Bahari	18th Dynasty – Amenhotep I
MMA 505 (TT310)	Nameless, possibly Meketre?	Treasurer of the King of Lower Egypt	Deir el-Bahari	11th Dynasty
MMA 506	Unknown		Deir el-Bahari	12th Dynasty
MMA 507	Tomb of the slain soldiers		Deir el-Bahari	12th Dynasty – Senusret I
MMA 508 (TT311)	Kheti	Treasurer of the King of Lower Egypt	Deir el-Bahari	11th Dynasty – Mentuhotep II
MMA 509 (TT312)	Nespaqashuty	Mayor of the town, Vizier	Deir el-Bahari	26th Dynasty – Psamtik I
MMA 509a	Unknown, perhaps Bebi	Vizier	Deir el-Bahari	11th Dynasty
MMA 510 (TT313)	Henenu	High steward	Deir el-Bahari	11th Dynasty – Mentuhotep II – Mentuhotep III
MMA 511	Possibly Henu		Deir el-Bahari	11th Dynasty
MMA 513 (TT314)	Horhotep	Seal-bearer of the King of Lower Egypt	Deir el-Bahari	11th Dynasty
MMA 514	Multiple burials		Deir el-Bahari	12th Dynasty
MMA 516 (TT315)	Ipi	Mayor of the town, Vizier, Judge	Deir el-Bahari	11th Dynasty – Mentuhotep II
MMA 517 (TT240)	Meru	Overseer of sealers	El-Assasif	11th Dynasty – Mentuhotep II
MMA 518 (TT316)	Neferhotep	Head of the archers	Deir el-Bahari	early Middle Kingdom
MMA 521	Statue of Iqer from this tomb		Deir el-Bahari	11th Dynasty
MMA 729	Multiple (Note: People buried in this tomb include: Rennefer (Chamber A), a Lady of the House; Neferkhawet (Chamber B), Chief Scribe; Baki III (East Chamber); Amenemhat (East Chamber); Ruiu IV (East Chamber))		El-Assasif	18th Dynasty Thutmose I – Thutmose III
MMA 801	Various		Deir el-Bahari	22nd Dynasty
MMA 807 (TT103)	Dagi	Mayor of the town, Vizier	Sheikh Abd el-Qurna	11th Dynasty – Mentuhotep II
MMA 808	Sebeknakht		Sheikh Abd el-Qurna	11th Dynasty – 18th Dynasty
MMA 812	Unknown		El-Assasif	11th Dynasty
MMA 813	Unknown		El-Assasif	11th Dynasty – 18th Dynasty
MMA 816	Unknown		El-Assasif	11th Dynasty
MMA 817	Unknown		El-Assasif	11th Dynasty – 18th Dynasty
MMA 818	Unknown		El-Assasif	11th Dynasty
MMA 819	Unknown		El-Assasif	11th Dynasty – 18th Dynasty
MMA 820 (TT366)	Djar	King's Guard of the Inner Palace	El-Assasif	11th Dynasty
MMA 821	Unknown		El-Assasif	11th Dynasty – 18th Dynasty
MMA 824	Unknown		El-Assasif	11th Dynasty – 18th Dynasty
MMA 825	Unknown		El-Assasif	21st Dynasty – 30th Dynasty
MMA 830	Unknown		El-Khokha	various
MMA 832	Aafenmut; Pakherkhonsu		El-Khokha	22nd Dynasty
MMA 834	Wesi		El-Khokha	18th Dynasty
MMA 839	Unknown		El-Assasif	11th Dynasty
MMA 840	Unknown		El-Assasif	12th Dynasty – 17th Dynasty
MMA 850	Unknown		Sheikh Abd el-Qurna	11th Dynasty
MMA 1021	Amenemhat Q	King's Son	El-Assasif	18th Dynasty
MMA 1101 (TT280)	Meketre	Chief steward, Chancellor	Sheikh Abd el-Qurna	11th Dynasty – Mentuhotep II – Mentuhotep III
MMA 1102	Wah	Estate manager of Meketre	Sheikh Abd el-Qurna	11th Dynasty

== See also ==
- List of burials in the Valley of the Kings
- List of burials in the Valley of the Queens

== Literature ==
- Porter, Bertha; Moss, Rosalind L.B. (1960). Topographical Bibliography of Ancient Egyptian Hieroglyphic Texts, Reliefs, and Paintings (pdf). Vol. I: The Theban Necropolis, Part 2: Royal Tombs and Smaller Cemeteries (Second revised and augmented ed.). Oxford: Oxford University Press.
- Kampp, Friederike (1996). Die thebanische Nekropole zum Wandel des Grabgedankens von der XVIII. bis zur XX. Dynastie, I-II. Theben (in German). Vol. 13. Mainz: Philipp Von Zabern. ISBN 978-3805315067.
