= TT340 =

Theban tomb

Theban tomb TT340
- Burial site of Amenemhat
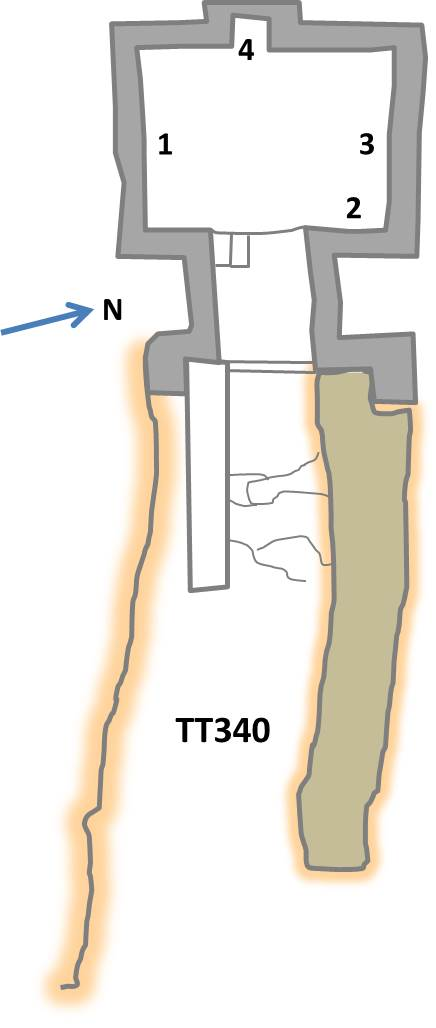
- plan of tomb chapel TT340

- Location within Egypt
- Location: Deir el-Medina, Theban Necropolis
- Discovered: 18th Dynasty
- Excavated by: 1925
- Decoration: painted
- ← Previous; TT339 Next → TT241

The Theban Tomb TT340 is the tomb chapel of an ancient Egyptian named Amenemhat, who lived during the 18th Dynasty as a servant.

The small painted chapel with a vaulted roof was excavated by the French Egyptologist Bernard Bruyère. It belongs to the 'servant (sDm-aS) Amenemhat who lived at the beginning of the 18th Dynasty around 1500 BC.

The walls of the chapel are mainly decorated with scenes showing Amenemhat and family members receiving offerings. They are painted on a yellow ground. On the south wall, Amenememhat and his wife Nubnofret are sitting on the right in front of an offering table. In front of them are sitting in two rows family members. On the upper half of the wall Amenemhat is shown twice, once in front of the Underworld god Osiris, once in front of Anubis. On the opposite north wall, funerary scenes are depicted, There is shown the white coffin of Amenemhat with mourning women. In a lower reigister, people bringing burial goods. At the top Amenemhat is again depicted in front of Anubis and Osiris. The scene is unfinished. There are no inscriptions. On the west wall Amenemhat and women are depicted twice, each time in front of an offering table. The decoration on the east wall (the wall with the entrance) is unfinished. Left of the entrance are painted two couples in front of an offering table. Only outlines and white parts are yet executed.

== Literature ==
- Bruyère, Bernard (1926) Rapport sur les fouilles de Deir El Médineh (1924–1925). (= Institut Français d'Archéologie Orientale. Band 03.3). Imprimerie de l'Institut français d'archéologie orientale, Cairo, OCLC 355680231, pp. 64–76, plate VII (online).
- Cherpion, Nadine (2005), Jean-Marie Kruchten (contribution), Laïla Ménassa (drawings): Deux tombes de la XVIIIe dynastie à Deir el-Medina: Nos. 340 (Amenemhat) et 354 (anonyme) (= Institut Française d'Archéologie Orientale du Caire. Volume 114). 2. Auflage, Institut français d'archéologie orientale, Cairo, ISBN 2-7247-0228-X.
- Bertha Porter, Rosalind L. B. Moss, Ethel W. Burney (1970): Topographical Bibliography of Ancient Egyptian Hieroglyphic Texts, Reliefs, and Paintings. I. The Theban Necropolis. Part 1. Private Tombs. 2nd edition . Griffith Institute, Ashmolean Museum, Oxford, S. 407–408 (PDF).
