= Tomb C.14 =

Ancient Egyptian tomb in Thebes

Theban tomb C.14
- Burial site of Anonymous (previously thought to be carved for Ankhefendjehuty)
- Location: Sheikh Abd el-Qurna, Theban Necropolis
- ← Previous; Tomb C.12 Mahu Next → Tomb C.15 Unknown

S34 f n G26
Ankhefendjehuty
in hieroglyphs
Era: New Kingdom
(1550–1069 BC)

The Theban Tomb C.14 is an ancient Egyptian tomb in Thebes, Upper Egypt. It is located in Sheikh Abd el-Qurna, part of the Theban Necropolis on the west bank of the Nile opposite Luxor. The tomb likely dates to the Twenty-sixth Dynasty of Egypt.

It was previously thought to be the burial place of Ankhefendjehuty, also called Neferibre-seneb. Recent work shows that Ankhefendjehuty likely usurped the tomb of Karakhamun (TT223). The tomb designated as C.14 by Wilkinson is in fact an unfinished, un-inscribed tomb. It was only partially constructed, and only one aisle of the pillared hall was completed.

== See also ==
- List of Theban Tombs
