= TT414 =

Theban tomb

Theban tomb TT414
- Burial site of Ankh-Hor
- Location within Egypt
- Location: El-Assasif, Theban Necropolis
- Discovered: 1970s
- ← Previous; TT413 Next → TT415

The Theban Tomb TT414 is located in El-Assasif, part of the Theban Necropolis, on the west bank of the Nile, opposite to Luxor. The tomb was originally constructed in the El-Assasif necropolis for the use of Ankh-hor and his family. Ankhor was the Chief Steward to the God's Wife Nitocris during the 26th Dynasty. Ankh-hor is dated to the reigns of Pharaohs Psamtik II and Apries. The tomb was later usurped during the 30th Dynasty and the Ptolemaic Period.

== Family of Ankh-hor ==
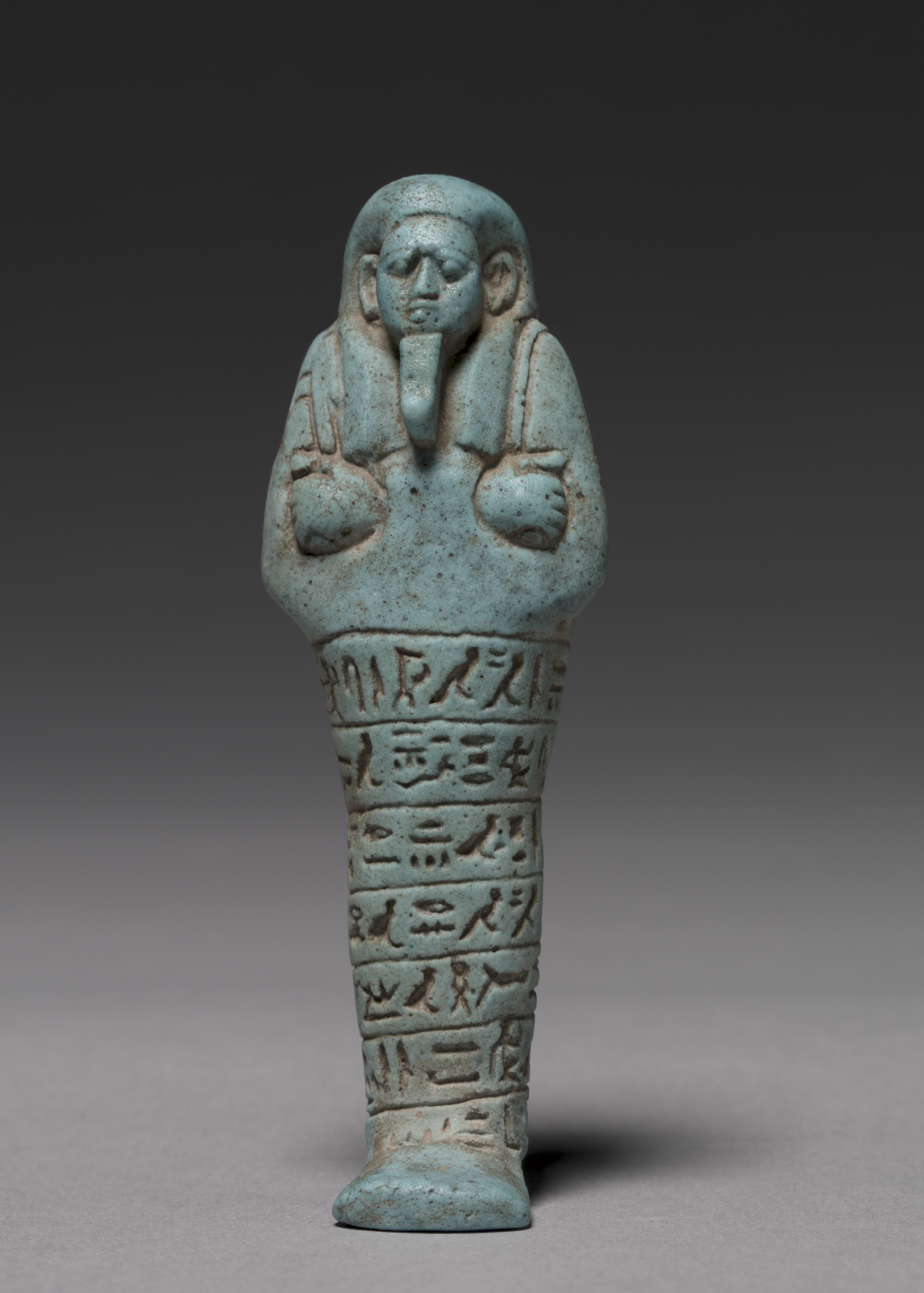
Shabti of Ankh-Hor

During the period of ca 590–530 BC the tomb was used for Ankh-hor and his family. Burials include those of Ankh-hor and family members including a sister, several brothers and a daughter. During this early phase of the use if the tomb the main burial sites were shafts in rooms 7,8 and 9. The burials were thoroughly ransacked, but remains of coffins, pearl nets, stelae, canopic jars, shabhtis, and Ptah-Sokar-Osiris statuettes were found. Fragments of two anthropoid coffins of Ankh-Hor were discovered in the tomb. The inner wooden coffin is notable due to the poor quality of the decorations. This is in stark contrast to the size and architecture of the tomb itself, as well as the quality of the funerary equipment of contemporary family members.

Relatively well preserved and of high quality is, for example, some of the coffins of a possible nephew or grandson of Ankh-Hor named Psammetik-men-em-Waset II. Parts of the coffin were found spread over multiple locations in the tomb. The largest fragments came from room 10, where the sarcophagus was apparently located.

In room 8 the remains of the funerary equipment of a woman named Her-aset was found. She was possibly the wife of one of Ankh-Hor's brothers. The finds included an anthropoid coffin, a wooden stele and a Ptah-Sokar-Osiris statuette.

== Family of Padi-Amun-neb-nesutawy I and Wahibre I ==
This second stage of the use of the tomb took place in ca. 380–300 BC. The family of Padi-Amen-neb-nesuttawy I, a priest of Amun from Karnak introduced secondary burials in room 7.1 and constructed additional rooms (for instance 10.2). The intact burial of Wahibre I dates to the 30th Dynasty, and the find was published by Bietak and Reiser-Haslauer in 1982.

== Family of Djed-Khonsu-iuef-ankh ==
During the period of 300-150 BC the tomb was used by the family of Djed-Khonsu-iuef-ankh. Secondary burials were placed in the tomb and some sarcophagi were recycled. The atrium of the tomb shows signs of repair during this time. Funerary items from the family of Djed-Khonsu-iuef-ankh and his wife Mut-min we found in rooms 4 and 7 of the tomb. These include fragments of the coffin of Djed-Khonsu-iuef-ankh himself, the canopic chest and hypocephalus of Mut-min, panels of the inner anthropoid coffins of Djed-Khonsu-iuef-ankh and Mut-menu's sons Padi-amun-neb-nesut-tawy V and Iret-Hor-ru. The tomb also contained the pedestal of a Ptah-Sokar-Osiris statue with the name of Amun-hotep called Py-hj, another son of Djed-Khonsu-iuef-ankh and his wife Mut-min. From inscriptions at the temple in Djeme (Medinet Habu) a fourth son is known, named Pa-kher-en-Khonsu V and his titles including God's father and prophet of Amun in Karnak, servant of the Upper-Egyptian crown, servant of Hor-wer-wadjti, administrator in the 3rd phyle of Amunemopet. The inscription at Djeme dates Pa-kher-en-Khonsu V to the reign of Alexander IV (years 5 and 12, i.e. 312 and 305 BC)

== Family of Horus and Osoroeris ==
During the period of 150/100 – 0 BC the tomb was used by the family of Horus (Hor) and one of his sons Osoroeris.

== See also ==
- List of Theban Tombs
