= TT164 =

Theban tomb

Theban tomb TT164
- Burial site of Intef
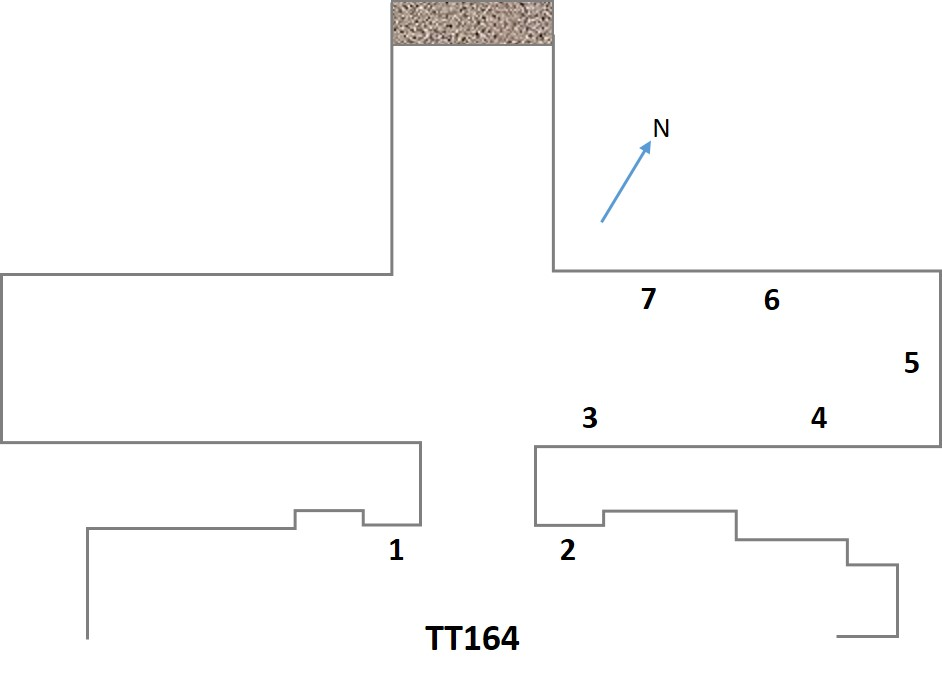

- Location within Egypt
- Location: Dra' Abu el-Naga', Theban Necropolis
- ← Previous; TT163 Next → TT165

W25 n&t&f
Intef
in hieroglyphs
Era: New Kingdom
(1550–1069 BC)

The Theban Tomb TT164 is located in Dra' Abu el-Naga', part of the Theban Necropolis, on the west bank of the Nile, opposite to Luxor.

TT164 is the burial place of the ancient Egyptian Intef, who was a scribe of recruits during the reign of Tuthmosis III in the Eighteenth Dynasty. Intef's time as a scribe of recruits may have overlapped with that of Tjanuny (TT74).

The tomb consists of a facade and a hall. Intef is depicted on the facade with a hymn. In the hall sons are shown bringing offerings to Intef and his wife. A stela with a hymn dedicated to Re-Harakhti was found. Intef is depicted spearing hippopotamus and in another scene he is shown fishing and fowling.

== See also ==
- List of Theban tombs
