= TT147 =

Theban tomb in Egypt

Theban tomb TT147
- Burial site of Heby / Neferrenpet
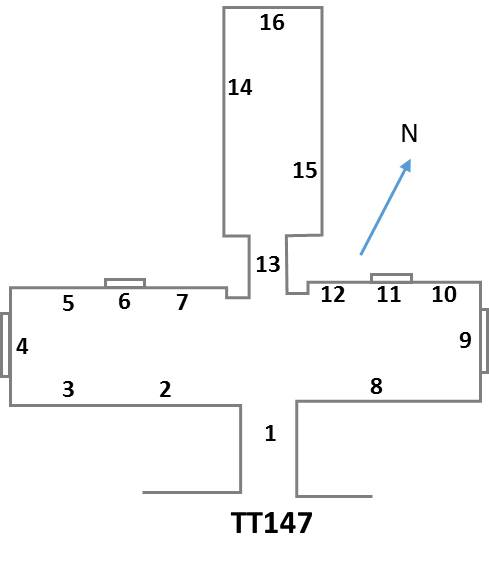

- Location within Egypt
- Location: Dra' Abu el-Naga', Theban Necropolis
- ← Previous; TT146 Next → TT148

The Theban Tomb TT147 is located in Dra' Abu el-Naga', part of the Theban Necropolis, on the west bank of the Nile, opposite to Luxor. It is the burial place of an Egyptian called Neferrenpet, who lived during the reign of Amenhotep III.

== See also ==
- List of Theban tombs
