= TT338 =

Ancient Egyptian tomb

Theban tomb 338
- Burial site of Maya
- Interior of the chapel of Maya, Museo Egizio, Turin (back wall)

- Location within Egypt
- Location: Deir el-Medina, Theban Necropolis
- Discovered: 1905-1906
- Excavated by: Ernesto Schiaparelli
- ← Previous; TT337 Next → TT339

Aa15 a M17 M17 and t A W19 M17 t B1
Maya and Tamyt
in hieroglyphs
Era: New Kingdom
(1550–1069 BC)

TT338 or chapel of Maya is the burial place of the ancient Egyptian artist Maya and his wife Tamyt in the necropolis of Deir el-Medina near modern Luxor, Egypt. Maya was titled "outline-draughtsman of Amun" and was active in the late Eighteenth Dynasty. The chapel was discovered and excavated in 1905-1906 by the Italian egyptologist Ernesto Schiaparelli, near the Tomb of Kha and Merit. The painted interior depicts the funerary procession and feasts of the deceased; the decoration was detached by the restorer Fabrizio Lucarini in 1906 and is housed today in the Museo Egizio in Turin, Italy.

== Owner ==
TT338 belonged to Maya (also transcribed Maï or May), an artist who bore the title "outline-draughtsman of Amun" who was active in the late Eighteenth Dynasty, after the reign of Akhenaten. His wife was named Tamyt.

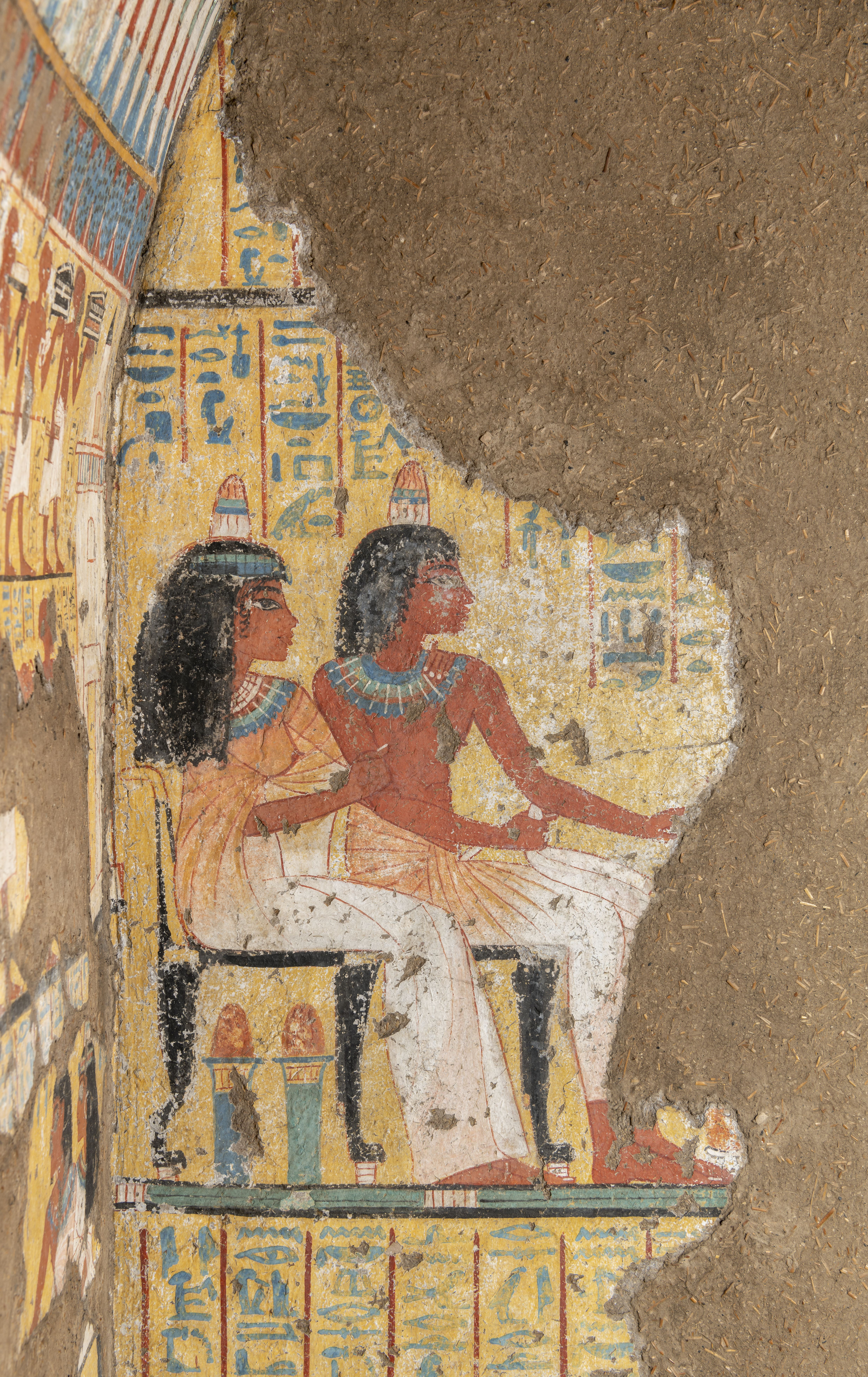
Maya and Tamyt portrayed seated in the back wall painting.

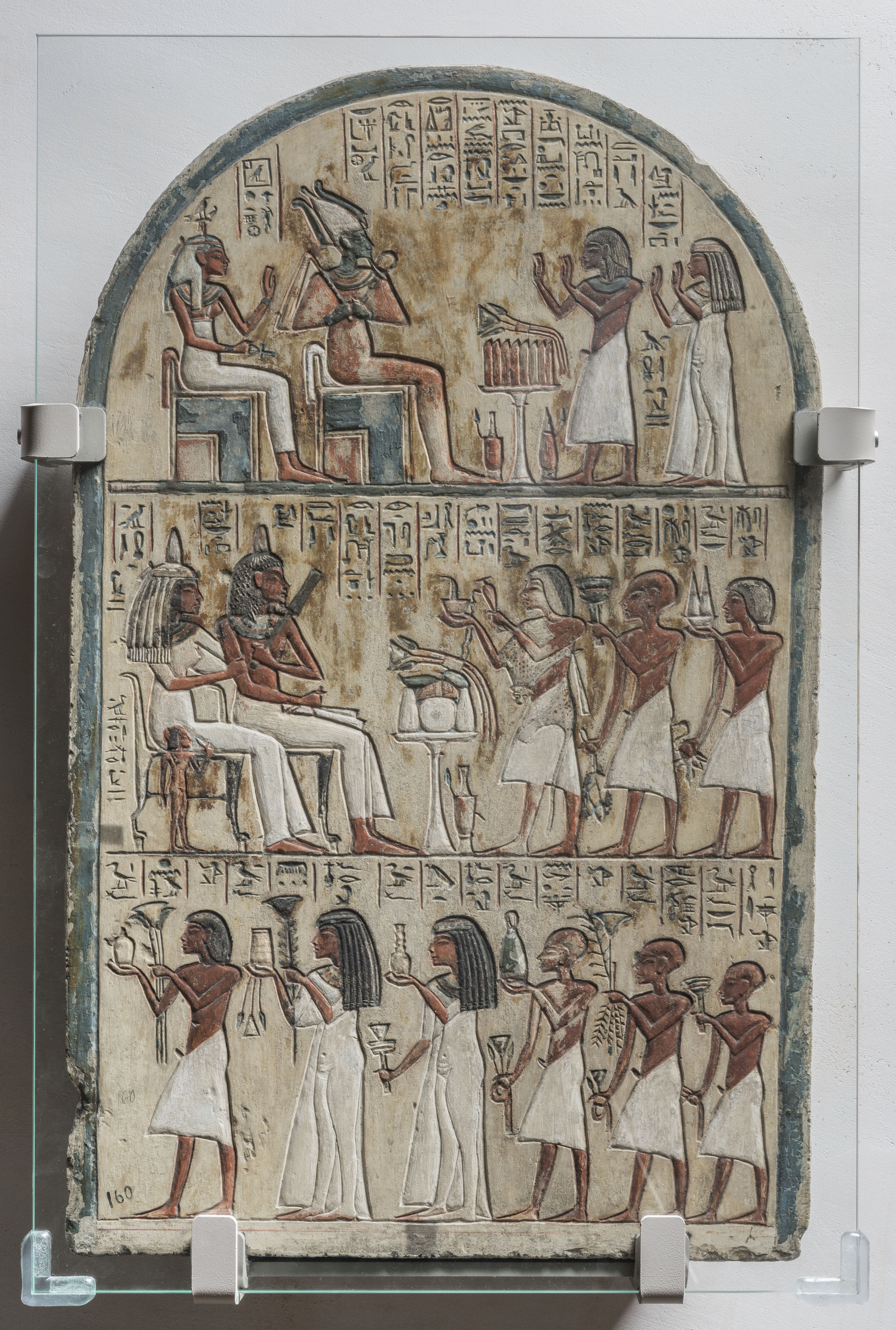
Funerary stela of Maya, limestone. Museo Egizio, Turin (C. 1579). The painted stela arrived in Turin with the Bernardino Drovetti collection in 1824. It was possibly discovered near the funerary chapel where Schiaparelli was to excavate roughly 80 years later. In the upper portion of the stele, Maya and his wife Tamyt pay homage to Osiris and Hathor, the gods of the necropolis. In the lower register is a similar, corresponding scene in which Maya and his wife receive food offerings, in their turn, from their many children, in keeping with a principle of reciprocity that is often found inn Egyptian religious thought.

== Description ==
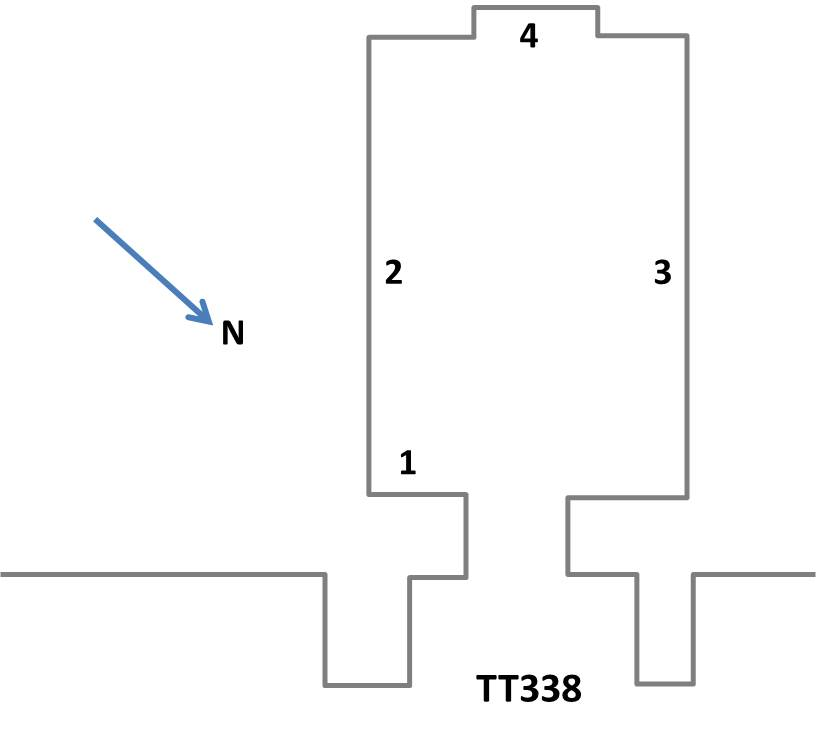
Schematic plan of TT38 tomb

The funerary chapel is situated in the northern cemetery of the workmen's village of Deir el-Medina, immediately east of TT8 and about 1 metre (3.3 ft) downhill of it. It was discovered in 1905-1906 by the Italian Archaeological Mission who removed the chapel's paintings to the Museo Egizio in Turin, Italy. The chapel was once pyramid-shaped but only the vaulted chamber remains; it was likely surrounded by a walled courtyard but nothing remains of the enclosure wall. The tomb is accessed via a shaft in the courtyard and leads to two small rooms which are uninscribed.

The chapel was entirely decorated with funerary scenes. The paintings of this chapel are axceptionally preserved, although not in their entirety. Wall painting was applied a tempera: the mudbrick walls were covered with a plaster of fresh mud and straw, painted after drying. The two long walls have three registers each depicting the funerary procession of the deceased to their tomb, the deceased receiving funerary offerings, and boat journeys to and from Abydos. The back wall had a funerary stele at its centre surrounded by depictions of seated couples and funerary priests.

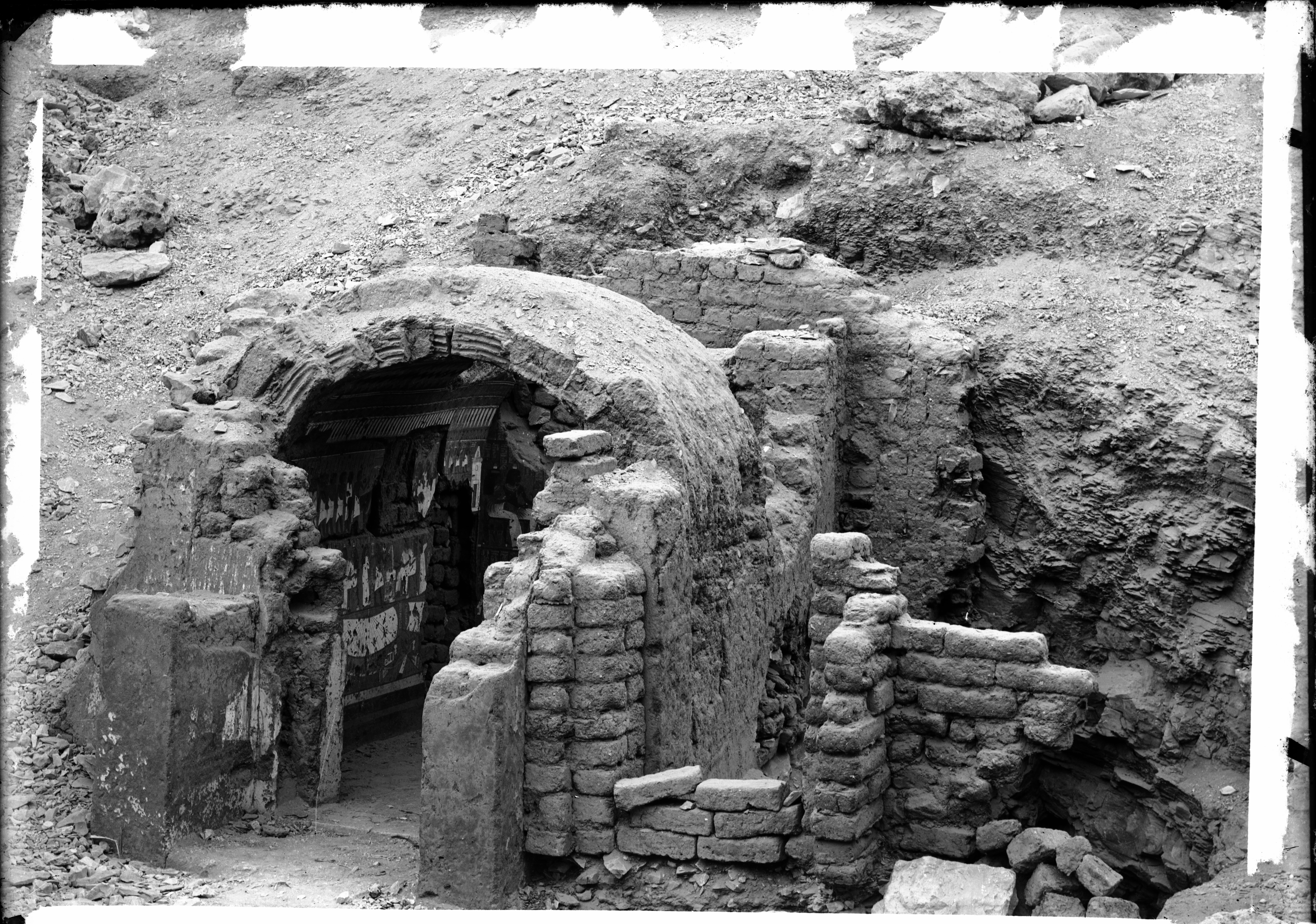
Exterior view of the chapel of Maia, in situ. Schiaparelli excavations, 1905-1906.

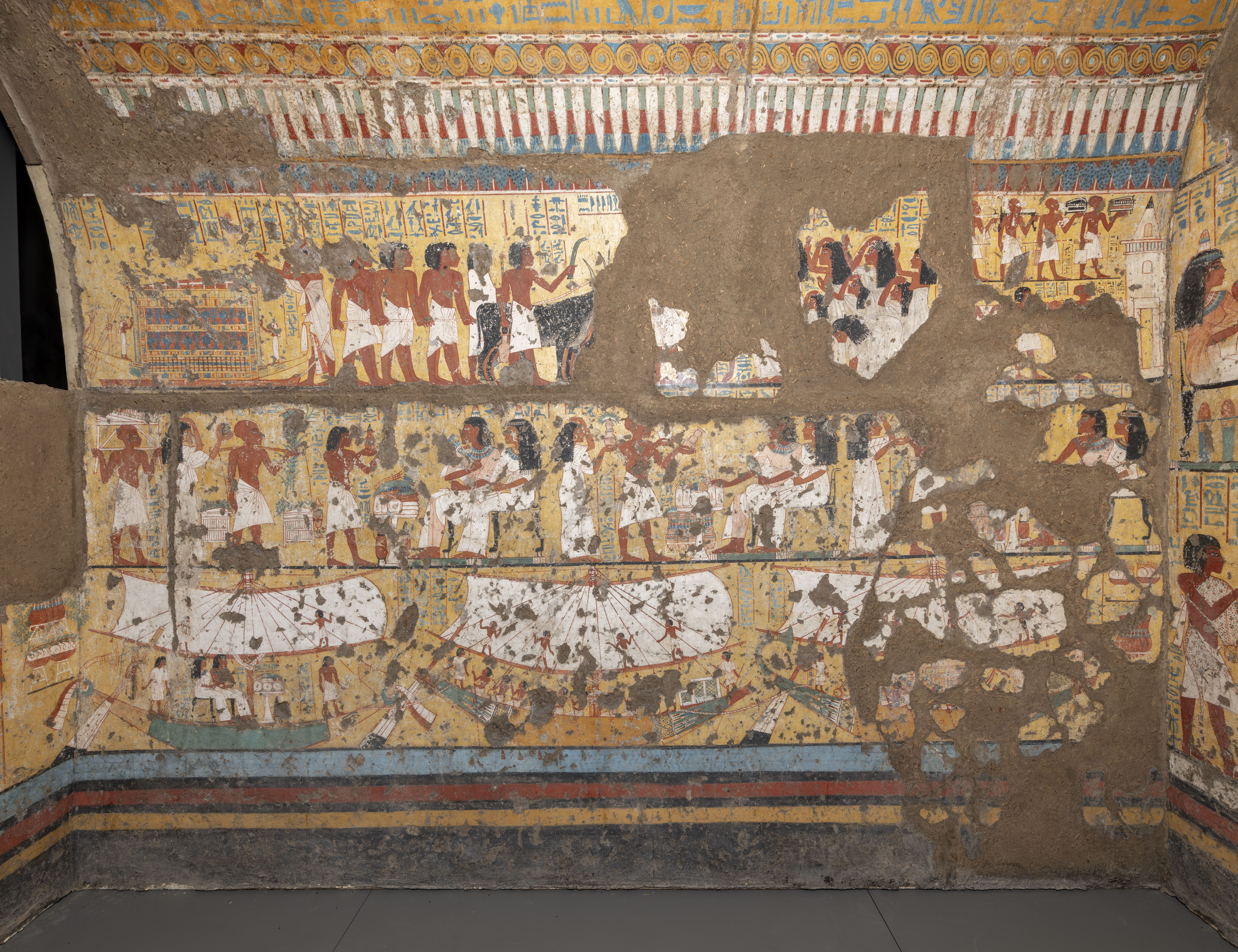
Paintings inside the chapel of Maya, Museo Egizio, Turin.

The entrance wall of the chapel

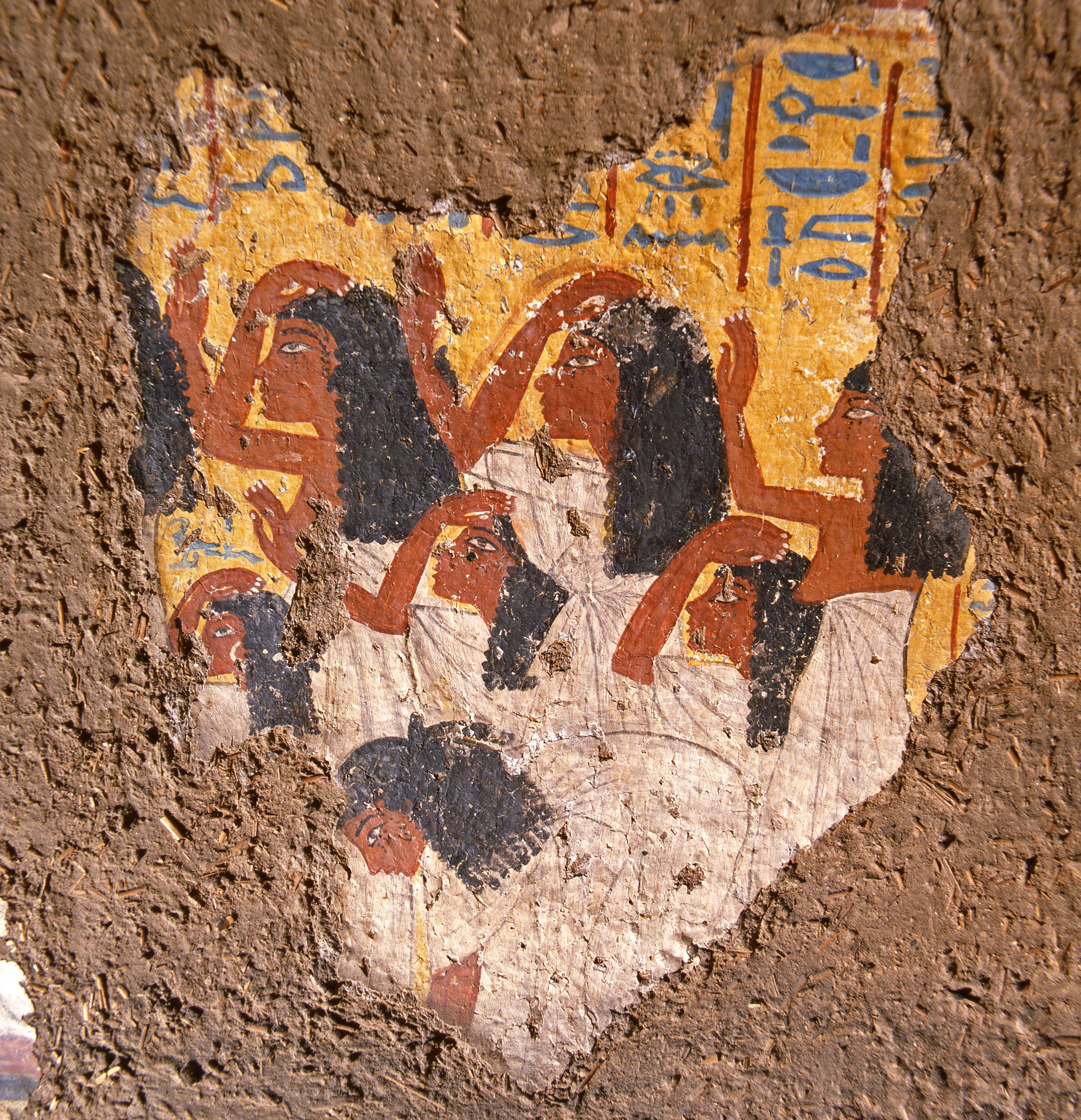
Detail of the wall decoration
