= TT133 =

Theban tomb

Coordinates: 25.7333°N 32.6000°E

Theban tomb TT133
- Burial site of Neferronpet
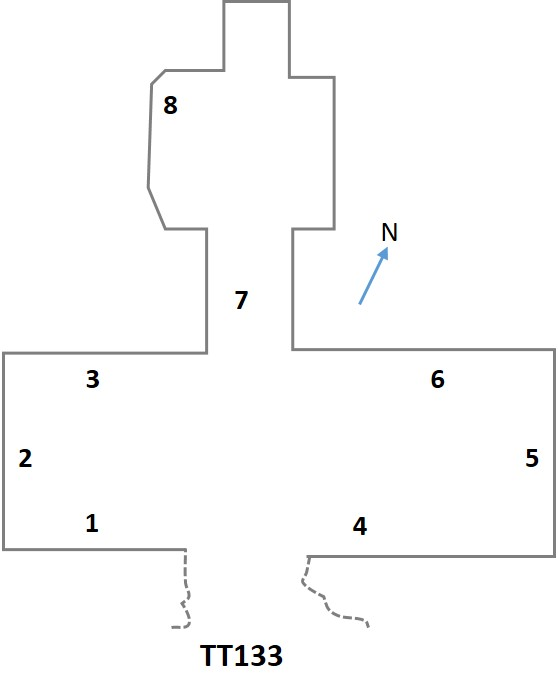

- Location within Egypt
- Location: Sheikh Abd el-Qurna, Theban Necropolis
- ← Previous; TT132 Next → TT134

F35 M4 t Z1
Neferronpet
in hieroglyphs
Era: New Kingdom
(1550–1069 BC)

The Theban Tomb TT133 is located in Sheikh Abd el-Qurna.

It is located within the Theban Necropolis, situated on the western bank of the Nile, directly across from Luxor.

The tomb belongs to a 19th Dynasty ancient Egyptian named Neferronpet, who was a Chief of weavers in the Ramesseum in the estate of Amun on the west of Thebes during the reign of Ramesses II. Neferronpet's wife was named Hunero.

The tomb has an inscribed hall. Neferronpet and Hunero are depicted with a tree-goddess in one scene. A possible additional title for Neferronpet appears in the hall: Chief of the Carrying Chairs of the Kings in Southern and the Kings in Northern Egypt.

== See also ==
- List of Theban tombs
