= Tomb D.1 =

Tomb in the Qurnet Murai necropolis

Theban tomb TTD1
- Burial site of Nehi
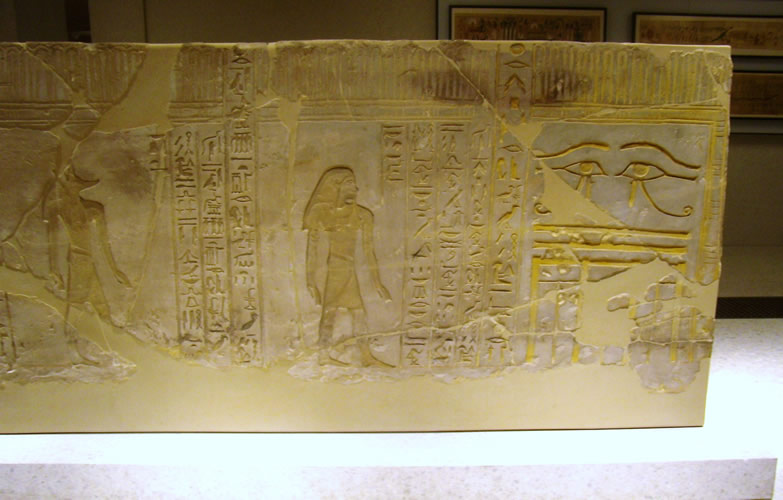
- Sarcophagus of Nehi
- Location: Qurnet Murai, Theban Necropolis
- Discovered: 1820
- ← Previous; Tomb C.15 Next → Tomb D.2

G21 H i
Nehy
in hieroglyphs
Era: New Kingdom
(1550–1069 BC)

Theban Tomb D.1 is located in Qurnet Murai. It forms part of the Theban Necropolis, situated on the west bank of the Nile opposite Luxor. The sepulchre is the burial place of the ancient Egyptian Nehi, who was Viceroy of Kush and Governor of the South Lands during the 18th Dynasty reign of the Pharaoh Thutmosis III.

== See also ==
- List of Theban Tombs
