= TT42 =

Theban tomb

Coordinates: 25.7333°N 32.6000°E

Theban tomb TT42
- Burial site of Amenmose
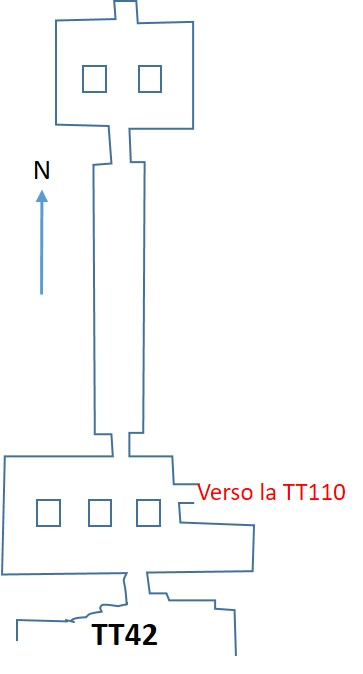

- Location within Egypt
- Location: Sheikh Abd el-Qurna, Theban Necropolis
- ← Previous; TT41 Next → TT43

i mn n ms s
Amenmose
in hieroglyphs
Era: New Kingdom
(1550–1069 BC)

The Theban Tomb TT42 is located in Sheikh Abd el-Qurna, part of the Theban Necropolis, on the west bank of the Nile, opposite to Luxor. It is the burial place of the ancient Egyptian Amenmose, who title was Captain of Troops, Eye of the King in Retenu, he is buried alongside his wife, Henuttaui.

== Tomb ==
The tomb decorations include the taking of a town in Syria and a northern tribute with Amenmose offering to king Tuthmosis III. It is possible that tribute scene is related to Amenmose's position as Overseer of the Northern Countries. The tribute recorded in Amenmose's tomb is unique in that it took place during a military campaign. The tribute is said to have taken place in the land of Negau, which was located in modern-day Lebanon. The fortress is shown as being located within a dense pine forest. In several scenes men are shown bringing vases, minerals, armament, horses, chariots and bulls. In one of the registers women are shown leading children by the hand. Amenmose also named Amenhotep II in his tomb indicating that he lived into the reign of Tuthmosis III's son and successor.

== See also ==
- List of Theban tombs
- N. de Garis Davies, Nina and Norman de Garis Davies, Egyptologists
