= TT286 =

Ancient Egyptian tomb

Theban tomb TT86
- Burial site of Niay
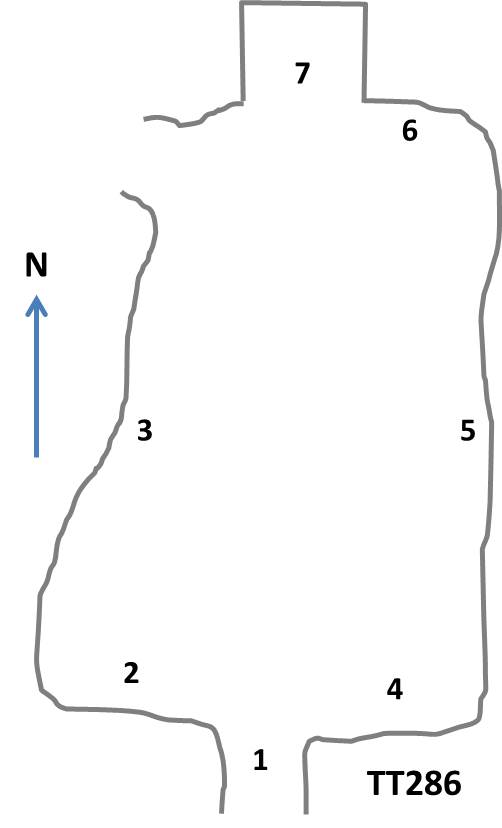
- Location: Dra' Abu el-Naga', Theban Necropolis
- ← Previous; TT285 Next → TT287

The Theban Tomb TT286 is located in Dra' Abu el-Naga', part of the Theban Necropolis, on the west bank of the Nile, opposite to Luxor.

== History ==
TT286 belongs to Niay the ‘scribe of the table,' and dates to the 20th Dynasty. TT286 is a "multi-chambered tomb with rich surviving wall decorations."

== Excavation and conservation ==
From January 2015 to June 2017, TT286 was one of the two tombs selected for conservation by the American Research Center in Egypt, working on behalf of the Egyptian Ministry of Tourism and Antiquities under a grant from the USAID. "The TT286 work involved finding and conserving an ancient mud brick wall outside the tomb entrance. New bricks were made to combine with the old wall, and the tomb entrance itself was strengthened. The guards at the necropolis had rescued some of the painted wall fragments after the villagers were evicted, so the conservation students [from the Ministry of Tourism and Antiquities who were receiving on-the-job training] examined the fragments and succeeded in reconnecting a few to their original locations on the painted walls. To accommodate visitors, a wooden floor was erected over the bedrock, with motion-activated solar lighting."
