= TT41 =

Theban tomb

Coordinates: 25.7333°N 32.6000°E

Theban tomb TT41
- Burial site of Amenemopet called Ipy
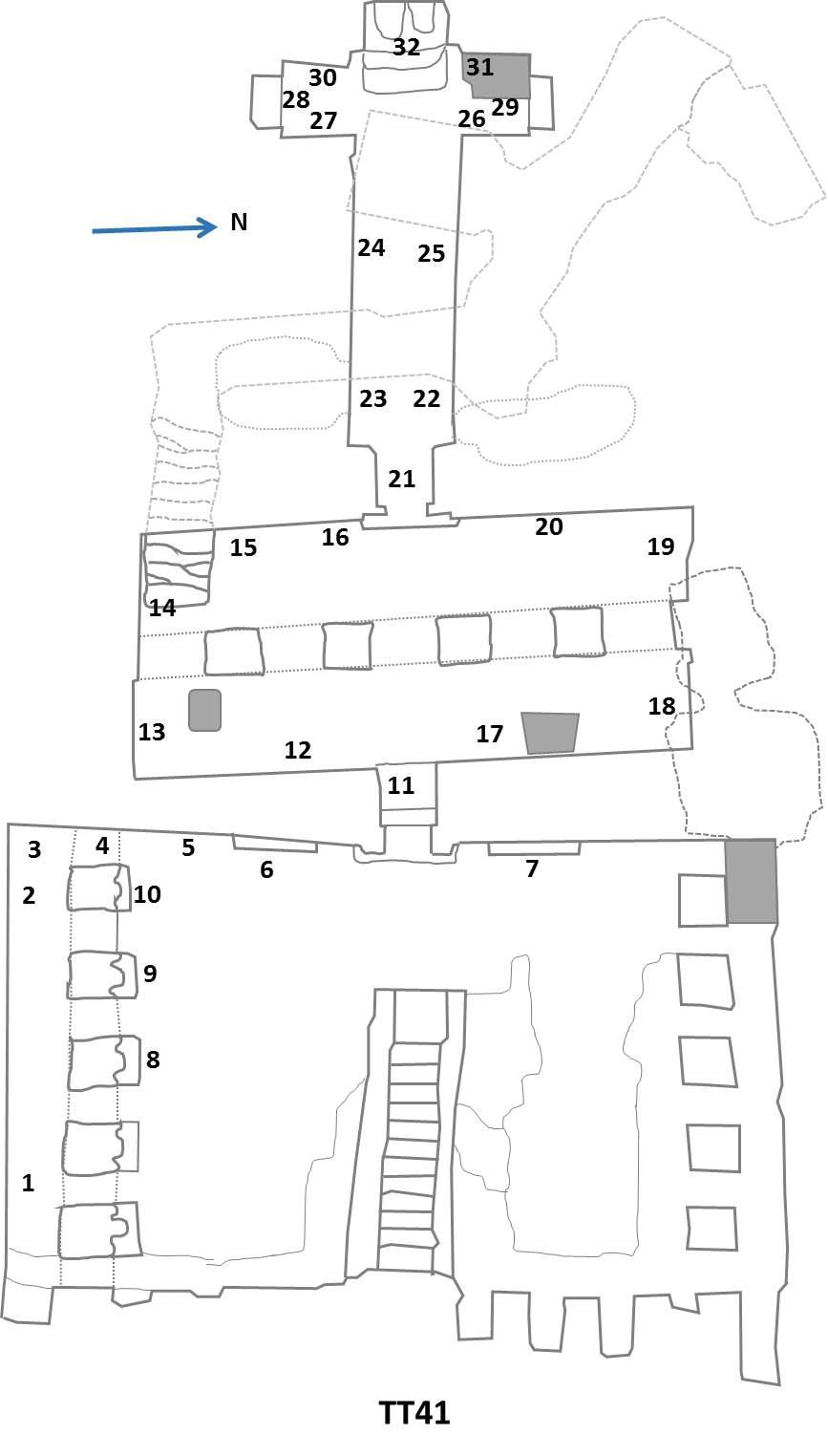

- Location within Egypt
- Location: Sheikh Abd el-Qurna, Theban Necropolis
- ← Previous; TT40 Next → TT42

i mn n M i p t O45 called i A2 p Z4 i i
Amenemopet called Ipy
in hieroglyphs
Era: New Kingdom
(1550–1069 BC)

The Theban Tomb TT41 also designated as Tomb B.4 is located in Sheikh Abd el-Qurna, part of the Theban Necropolis, on the west bank of the Nile, opposite to Luxor. It is the burial place of the ancient Egyptian Amenemopet called Ipy, whose title was Chief Steward of Amun in the Southern City. He dates to the time of Ramesses I, Sethi I and Ramesses II from the Nineteenth Dynasty of Egypt

Amenemopet called Ipy was the son of a judge named Nefertiu and his wife Iny (or Aniy), who was a songstress of the Theban Triad. Amenemopet called Ipy's wife was named Nedjemet, a chantress of Amun, born of the Chantress of Amun Maya. Further titles of Amenhotep called Ipy include Superintendent of the Granary of the North and the South, Superintendent of the prophets of Min and Isis, and Majordomo of the God’s Wife.

== See also ==
- List of Theban tombs
