= TT226 =

Theban tomb

Theban tomb TT226
- Burial site of Heqareshu
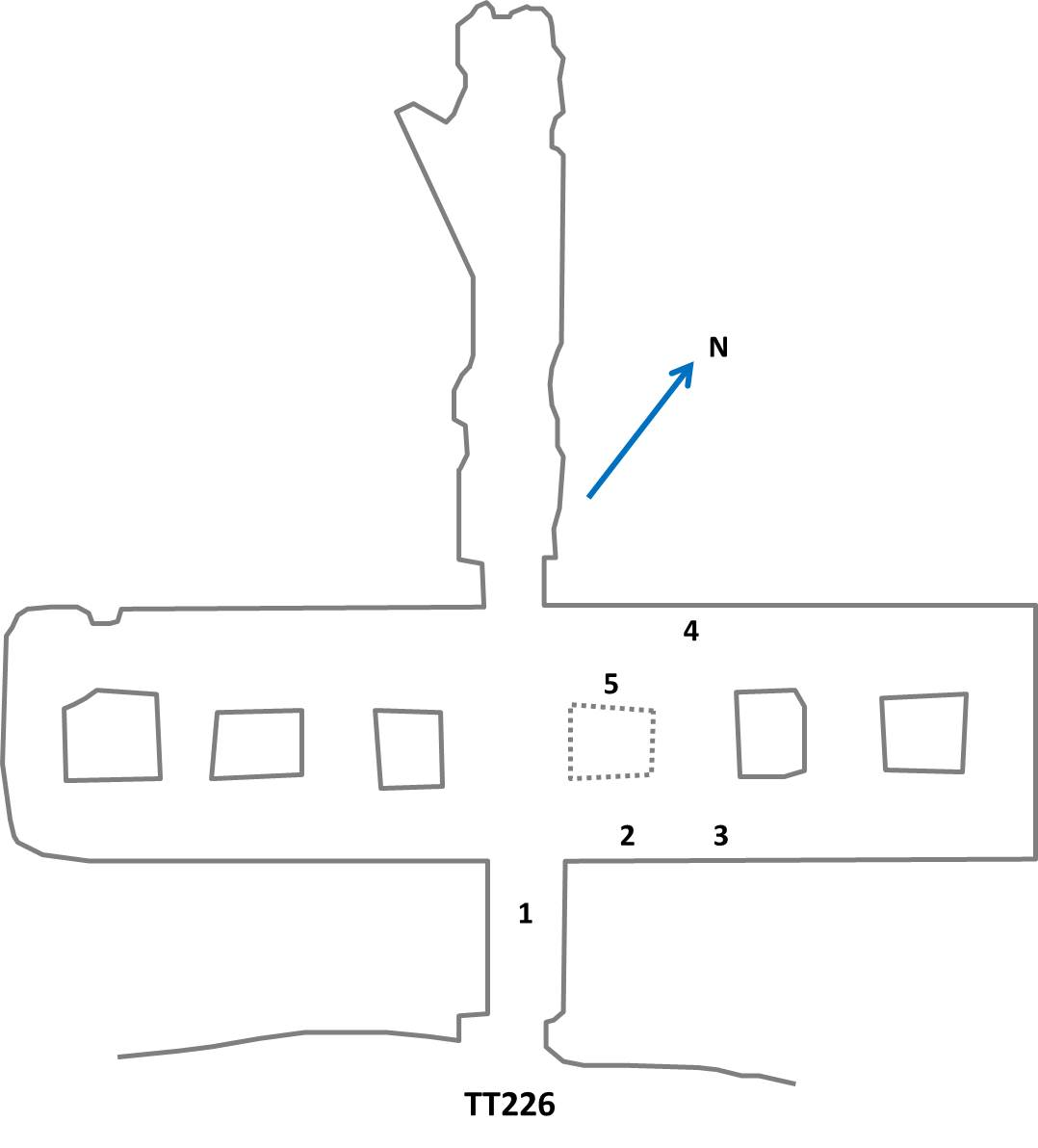

- Location within Egypt
- Location: Sheikh Abd el-Qurna, Theban Necropolis
- ← Previous; TT225 Next → TT227

S38 q Y1 r S w A2 A51
Heqareshu
in hieroglyphs
Era: New Kingdom
(1550–1069 BC)

The Theban Tomb TT226 is located in Sheikh Abd el-Qurna, part of the Theban Necropolis, on the west bank of the Nile, opposite to Luxor. It is the burial place of the ancient Egyptian Heqareshu (Hekreshu), who was an Overseer of the King's Tutors during the reign of Tuthmosis IV in the Eighteenth Dynasty.

In TT226 Heqareshu is depicted with four royal sons, including princes whose names have been reconstructed as Akheperre and Akheperure. Davies had suggested that Heqareshu was a tutor to the sons of Amenhotep III, but Newberry shows that these princes are sons of Tuthmosis IV. Pharaoh Amenhotep III is depicted in TT226 with his mother Queen Mutemwia, showing that Heqareshu died sometime during the (early) reign of Amenhotep III.

In TT64 (the tomb of Hekerneheh) Heqareshu is shown with a prince named Tuthmosis-Kakau (the future Tuthmosis IV) on his lap. Heqareshu is given the title Tutor of the king's eldest son Tuthmosis-Kha'kha'w.

== See also ==
- List of Theban tombs
