= TT111 =

Theban tomb

Theban tomb TT111
- Burial site of Amenwahsu
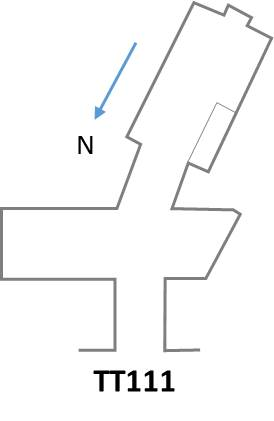

- Location within Egypt
- Location: Sheikh Abd el-Qurna, Theban Necropolis
- ← Previous; TT110 Next → TT112

i mn n V29 sw
Amenwahsu
in hieroglyphs
Era: New Kingdom
(1550–1069 BC)

The Theban Tomb TT111 is located in Sheikh Abd el-Qurna, part of the Theban Necropolis, on the west bank of the Nile, opposite to Luxor. The tomb belongs to a 19th Dynasty ancient Egyptian named Amenwahsu, who was a Scribe of divine writing of the estate of Amun during the reign of Ramesses II. Amenwahsu was a son of Simut, who was a head of outline draughtsmen, and the lady Wiay. Amenwhasu's wife was named Iuy. She was a songstress of Bubastis.

== Tomb ==
The tomb has an inscribed hall and ceiling. Amenwahsu is mentioned several times in inscriptions on the ceiling. The scenes in the hall depict Amenwahsu and his family. On one side is a scene with Amenwhasu and his parents Simut and Wiay. Amenwahsu is accompanied by his wife and children. His wife Iuy is a Lady of the house and chantress of Bastet, Lady of Ankh Tawy. Their children include sons Ipu and Dedia, several daughters were depicted but only one name remains: that of the lady Merysekhmet. A grandson named Khaemopet also appears in the tomb.

Other titles of Amenwahsu which appear in the tomb are: leader in the House of Amun, wab-priest of Sekhmet, who purifies the offering table, Festival leader of all the gods in their annual feasts, guide of the (God's) Barque in safety with spells of glorification from his mouth.

== See also ==
- List of Theban tombs
