= TT223 =

Ancient Egyptian tomb, part of the Theban Necropolis

Theban tomb TT223
- Burial site of Karakhamun
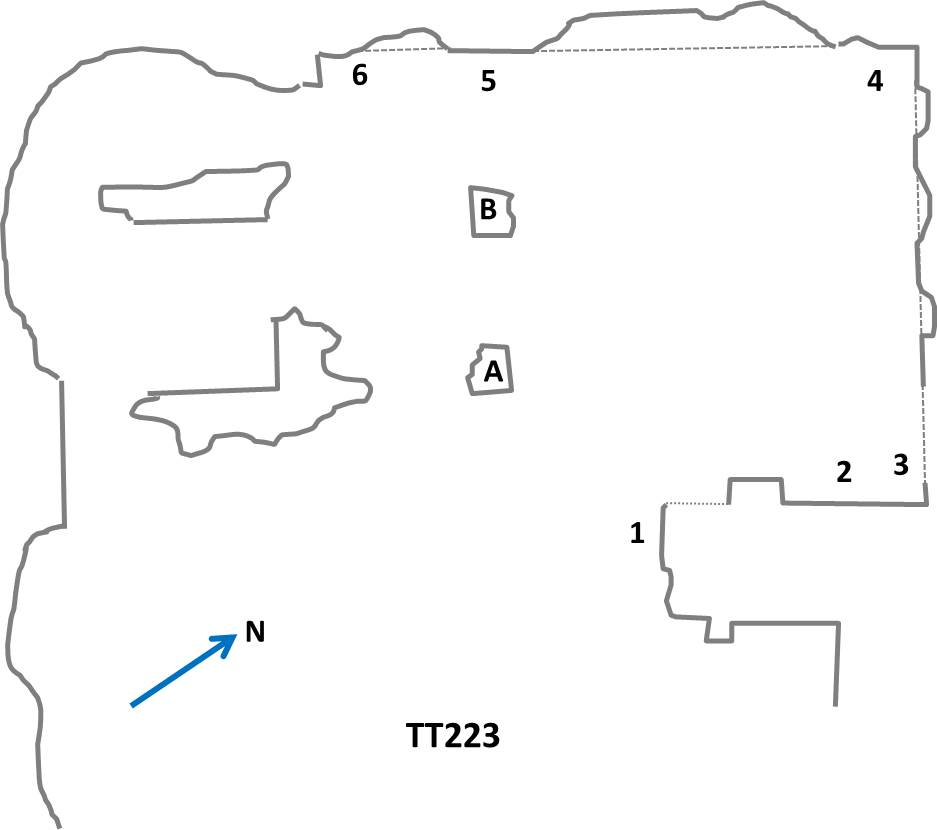

- Location within Egypt
- Location: South El-Assasif, Theban Necropolis
- Discovered: 1820
- ← Previous; TT222 Next → TT224

D28 Z1 E23 r Aa1 Z4 i mn n
Karakhamun
in hieroglyphs
Era: New Kingdom
(1550–1069 BC)

Theban Tomb TT223 is located in South El-Assasif. It forms part of the Theban Necropolis, on the west bank of the Nile opposite Luxor. The site is the burial place of the ancient Egyptian Karakhamun. It was first discovered in 1820 by Wilkinson, Hey and Burton, then by Lepsius, it was reopened in 2001.

The tomb consists of a court and a pillared hall. A scene from the court depicting Karakhamun adoring deities Re-Harakhti and Nut, with an adjoining scene showing a lion-headed goddess is now in the Berlin Museum (2110). The pillared hall contains among others an opening of the mouth ceremony scene and men making offerings before Karakhamun. A brother named Esamenopet was depicted in the tomb.

TT223 is not open to the public, as of 8 May 2004.

== See also ==
- List of Theban tombs
