= Amenmose (TT42) =

Ancient Egyptian noble

Amenmose was an ancient Egyptian noble who lived during the reigns of Thutmose III and Amenhotep II. His titles were Captain of Troops, Eye of the King in Retenu. He was buried along with his wife, Henuttaui, in a tomb in Sheikh Abd el-Qurna, part of the Theban Necropolis.
