= Intef (general) =

- Buried: TT386, Egypt
- Allegiance: Egypt
- Years active: c. 2025 BC
- Rank: Great Overseer of Troops (General)

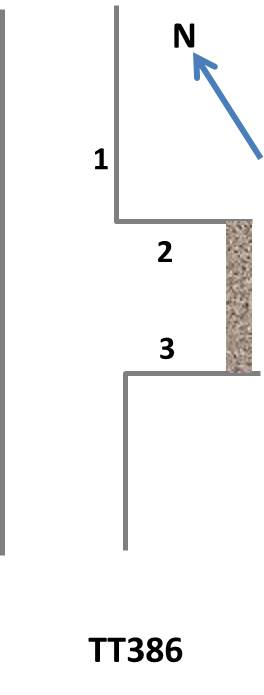
Plan of Intef's tomb TT386

Intef (Antef; fl. c. 2025 BC) was an Ancient Egyptian general of the 11th Dynasty, under king Mentuhotep II. His main title was overseer of troops often translated as general. Other titles include royal sealer and sole friend (of the king).

Intef is mainly known from his Theban tomb. This is a saff-tomb (TT386). It was fully decorated. The facade has several pillars with paintings, while the corridor behind was covered with relief decorated stone slabs. Behind the corridor there is a chapel also once decorated with slabs of stone, this time painted. Several of the paintings are well preserved on the front pillars and the wall behind them. They show the siege of a Palestine fortress, hunting in the marshes, agricultural scenes and workshops. The slabs of the corridor and cult chapel are only preserved in fragments. In the tomb appears the throne name: Mentuhotep II, confirming the dating of Intef under this king. At the cult chamber is the entrance to the underground burial chamber and there is standing uninscribed sarcophagus of Intef. In the tomb was also found a statue of Intef. Finally, in the Ny Carlsberg Glyptotek in Copenhagen is a stela of the general.
