= Mayor of Thebes =

Position in ancient Egypt

Mayor of Thebes (Haty-a-en-Niut) was an important position in ancient Egypt, as Thebes was the capital of Egypt for a long time. This title is documented in the monuments of the New Kingdom.

In addition to this title, which included the capital on the east bank of the Nile at Luxor, including the Karnak temples, there was also another official and another position for the mayor of the western side of Thebes, which was the mayor of West Thebes.

== In hieroglyphics ==
The first name: "Haty Aa" is formed by the two syllables: the lion's chest 𓄂 (Hat) and the arm 𓂝 (Aa or Ai or simply A), and they mean to go forward, or the one who is in front, then "In" from one letter which is a water wave and it is an addition letter that adds what comes before it to what comes after it, then "Niut" meaning the city or the metropolis (comparing to the village).

== Assignments ==
During the 18th Dynasty the person who held this title was the most influential official in the city of Thebes (Upper Egypt).

From the 19th Dynasty, during the reign of Ramesses II, the position of Mayor of West Thebes appeared, responsible for the western part of the city, the area of the funerary temples and the necropolises (now also called the Theban Necropolis), so the Mayor of Thebes was left only with responsibility for the eastern part of the city.
