= Rosalind Moss =

British Egyptologist and bibliographer

Rosalind Louisa Beaufort Moss, FSA (21 September 1890 – 22 April 1990) was a British Egyptologist and bibliographer, noted for her work on The Topographical Bibliography of Ancient Egyptian Hieroglyphic Texts, Reliefs and Paintings.

== Biography ==
Rosalind was born at Shrewsbury School, Shropshire, England. She was educated at Heathfield School, Ascot and read for a diploma in anthropology as a student in the Society of Oxford Home Students, which later became St Anne's College. She participated in archaeological excavations at the palaeolithic site of La Cotte de St Brelade in Jersey in 1914, directed by her tutor Robert Ranulph Marett. Rosalind was awarded the diploma in anthropology in 1917 and a BSc in 1922 for her thesis which was published in 1925 as The Life after Death in Oceania and the Malay Archipelago.

Rosalind began to study Egyptology in 1917 by attending classes given by Professor Francis Griffith, who was supervising the compilation of the Topographical Bibliography. Miss Bertha Porter had undertaken the initial phase of research until 1929. Rosalind began work on the Theban Necropolis volume in 1924, during which time she visited many royal and private tombs in Egypt. Work then begun on Volumes III to VI, which covered the area between Delta and Aswan. This included trips to numerous monuments such as the temples at Kom Ombo and Edfu. The final volume 7 on Nubia and other monuments beyond Egypt was published in 1951. Following the death of Professor Griffith in 1934 and his wife in 1937, their library was transferred to the newly founded Griffith Institute within the Ashmolean Museum, Oxford.

Rosalind continued to undertake research in the Griffith Institute, both on new publications and updated versions of the Topographical Bibliography. Rosalind retired from the Griffith Institute in 1970. In celebration of her 100th birthday, a collection of essays was edited by T.G.H. James and Jaromír Málek .

== Awards and recognition ==
She was awarded a DLitt honoris causa by Oxford University in 1961. She was elected as a Fellow of the Society of Antiquaries in 1949 and an honorary fellow of St Anne's college, Oxford in 1967. Volume 58 of The Journal of Egyptian Archaeology was dedicated to Rosalind.

== Publications ==
- Moss, R. 1925. The Life after Death in Oceania and the Malay Archipelago. Oxford.
- Moss, R. 1933. An Unpublished Rock-Tomb at Asyûṭ. The Journal of Egyptian Archaeology, 19(1/2), 33–33.
- Moss, R. 1941. Some Rubbings of Egyptian Monuments Made a Hundred Years Ago. The Journal of Egyptian Archaeology 27, 7–11.
- Moss, R. 1949. An Egyptian Statuette in Malta. The Journal of Egyptian Archaeology, 35, 132–134.
- Moss, R. 1950. The Ancient Name of Serra (Sudan). The Journal of Egyptian Archaeology, 36, 41–42.
- Porter, B & Moss, R. 1994 Topographical Bibliography of Ancient Egyptian Hieroglyphic Texts, Reliefs, and Paintings: The Theban Necropolis; Pt. 1. Private Tombs. Oxford: Griffith Institute, Ashmolean Museum.
- Porter, B., Moss, R. L., & Burney, E. W. (1975), Topographical Bibliography of Ancient Egyptian Hieroglyphic Texts, Reliefs and Paintings. VII. Nubia: The Deserts and Outside Egypt. Oxford: Clarendon Press. PDF
- Porter, B., Moss, R. L., & Burney, E. W. (1974) second edition,Topographical Bibliography of Ancient Egyptian Hieroglyphic Texts, 111. Memphis Part I. Abû Rawâsh to Abûsîr, PDF
- Porter, B., Moss, R. L., & Burney, E. W. (1968 reissue), Topographical Bibliography of Ancient Egyptian Hieroglyphic Texts Reliefs and Paintings, IV. Lower and Middle Egypt (Delta and Cairo to Asyut) Griffith Institute, University Press Oxford PDF
