= TT413 =

Egyptian tomb

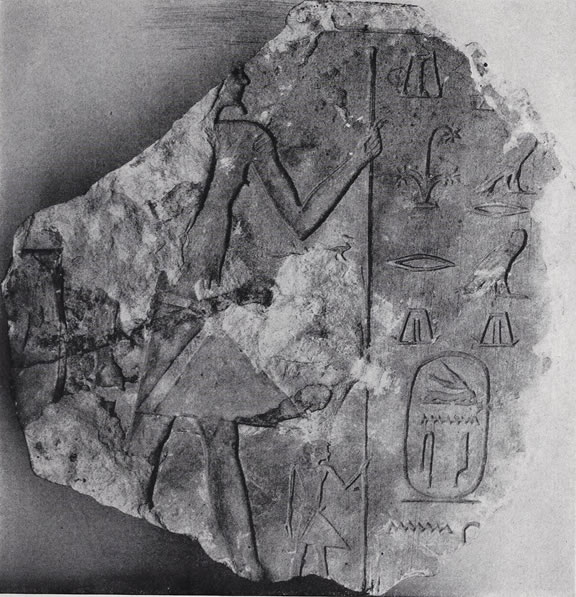
- Stela of Unasankh; Burial site of Unasankh
- Interactive map of TT413
- Type: Tomb
- Location: Luxor, Egypt

History
- Built: c. 2300 BC

TT413 is the modern name (TT stands for Theban Tomb) for the burial place and rock cut tomb chapel of the local governor Unasankh who lived most likely in the 6th Dynasty, around 2300 BC. The tomb consists of a decorated chapel with two rooms and three burial chambers that were cut under the chapel into the rocks, each burial chamber had its own entrance.

The decoration of the chapel is painted and shows Unasankh and his wife in front of an offering table on the right of the western wall. In the middle are offerings shown and on the left there appear several people bringing and preparing offerings. On the southern wall, he is show alone with granaries in front of him in two rows of musicians. On the same wall two ships are shown. Near the tomb were discovered two stelae showing Unasankh and listing many of his titles.

== See also ==
- List of Theban tombs

== Literature ==
- Mohamed Saleh: Three Old-Kingdom Tombs at Thebes (= Archaeologisches Veroffentlichungen. Band 14). von Zabern, Mainz 1977, ISBN 3-8053-0043-3, pp. 12–17.
