= Bertha Porter =

English biographer and bibliographer

Bertha Porter (1852–1941) was an English biographer and bibliographer known for her editorial role in the compilation of the Topographical Bibliography of Ancient Egyptian Hieroglyphic Texts, Reliefs, and Paintings.

== Early life ==
Bertha Porter was born in 1852 to Frederick William Porter, an architect of Irish birth and from 1860 surveyor to the Worshipful Company of Clothworkers, and his wife Sarah Moyle; little is known of Bertha's life, other than that she moved in literary circles. Her parents owned property in London and Hythe.

== Writing ==
Porter was engaged by Sidney Lee to write for the Dictionary of National Biography, completing 156 biographies by the time she left.

Francis Llewellyn Griffith, whilst working at the British Museum (he left in 1896), established funding and direction for the compilation of a Topographical Bibliography of Ancient Egyptian Hieroglyphic Texts, Reliefs, and Paintings, with the purpose of establishing the location and content of texts found on ancient monuments in Egypt and later Sudan. Porter was engaged to lead the compilation of the bibliography, a task which occupied her until her retirement from the project in 1929, a greater than 30-year span.

Porter studied hieroglyphs in London under Griffith and also under Kurt Sethe at the University of Göttingen. Her work was entirely London-based; she never travelled to Egypt. Instead, from 1924, she relied on Rosalind Moss to do field-work; Moss took over Porter's responsibilities upon her retirement. The bibliography is commonly referred to as Porter & Moss.
