= Theban Necropolis =

Area in Egypt, west of the Nile near Thebes

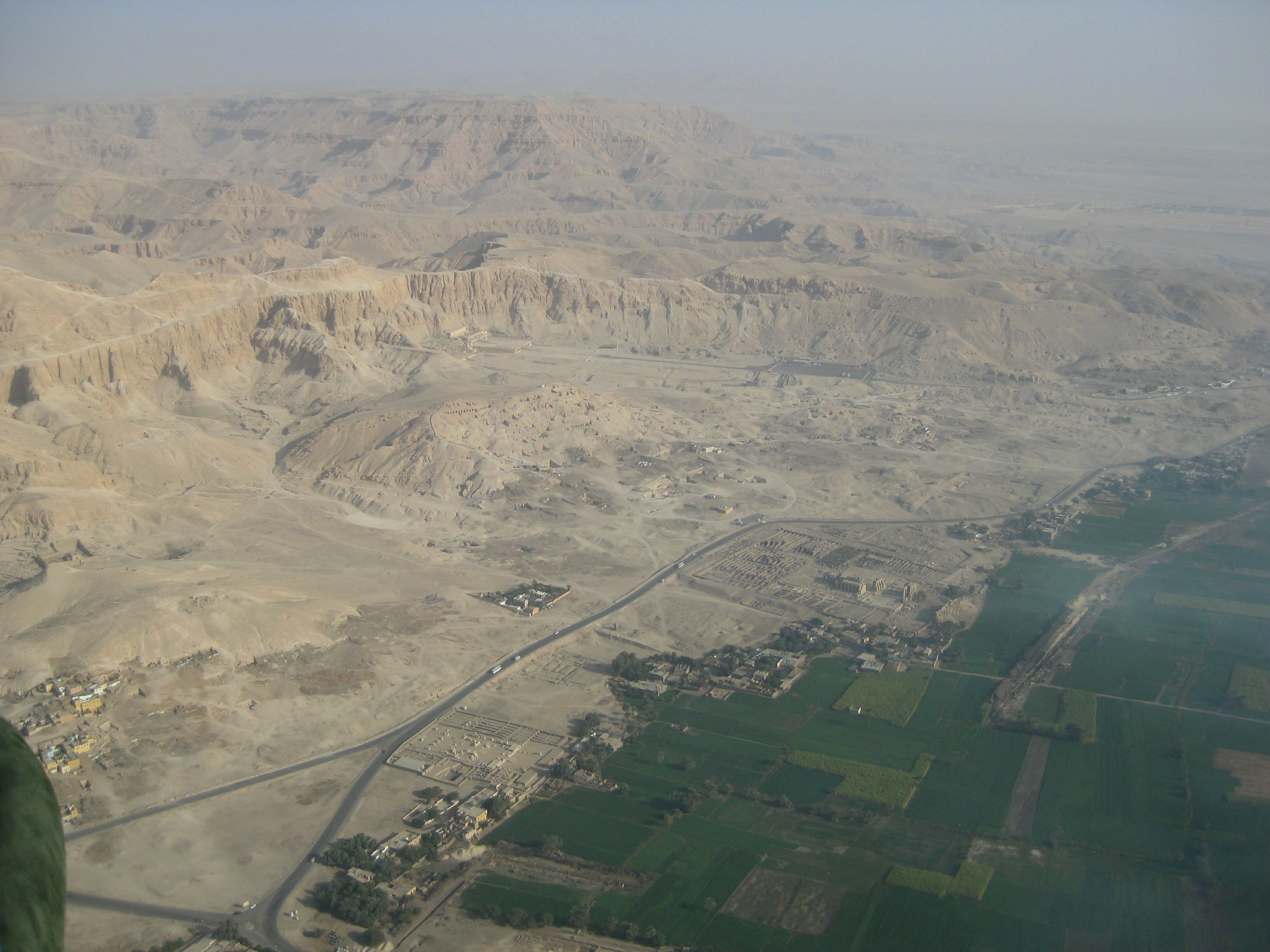
- Aerial view of the Theban Necropolis

- Location within Egypt
- 25°44′N 32°36′E
- Type: Necropolis
- Location: Qurnah District, Luxor Governorate, Egypt
- Region: Upper Egypt
- Part of: Thebes

UNESCO World Heritage Site
- Official name: Ancient Thebes with its Necropolis
- Type: Cultural
- Criteria: i, iii, vi
- Designated: 1979 (3rd session)
- Reference no.: 87
- Region: Arab States

The Theban Necropolis (Arabic: مدينة طيبة الجنائزية, romanized: Madīnat Ṭaybah al-Janāʼizīyah) is a necropolis on the west bank of the Nile, opposite Thebes (Luxor) in Upper Egypt. The necropolis was used for ritual burials throughout much of the Pharaonic period, particularly during the New Kingdom.

== Mortuary temples ==
- Deir el-Bahri
  - Mortuary Temple of Hatshepsut
  - Mortuary temple of Mentuhotep II
  - Mortuary Temple of Thutmose III
- Medinet Habu
- Mortuary Temple of Amenhotep III
  - Colossi of Memnon
- Mortuary Temple of Merneptah
- Mortuary Temple of Ramesses IV
- Mortuary Temple of Thutmose IV
- Mortuary Temple of Thutmose III
- Mortuary Temple of Twosret
- Temple of Nebwenenef
- Qurna
  - Mortuary Temple of Seti I
- Mortuary Temple of Amenhotep II
- Ramesseum (Mortuary Temple of Ramesses II)

== Royal Necropolis ==
- Valley of the Kings (Modern: "Wadi el-Muluk")
- Valley of the Queens (Modern: "Biban el-Harim")
- Royal Cache
- Bab el-Gasus

== Necropolis ==
- Deir el-Medina
  - Workmen's Tombs
  - Shrine to Meretseger & Ptah
- Tombs of the Nobles
  - el-Assasif
  - el-Khokha
  - el-Tarif
  - Dra' Abu el-Naga'
  - Qurnet Murai
  - Sheikh Abd el-Qurna

== See also ==
- List of Theban tombs
- Theban Mapping Project
