= TT10 =

Ancient Egyptian tomb

Coordinates: 25.7333°N 32.6000°E

Theban tomb TT10
- Burial site of Penbuy & Kasa
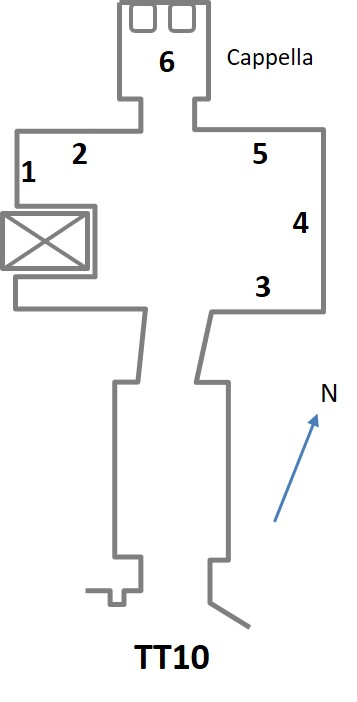

- Location within Egypt
- Location: Deir el-Medina, Theban Necropolis
- Discovered: 19th Dynasty
- ← Previous; TT9 Next → TT11

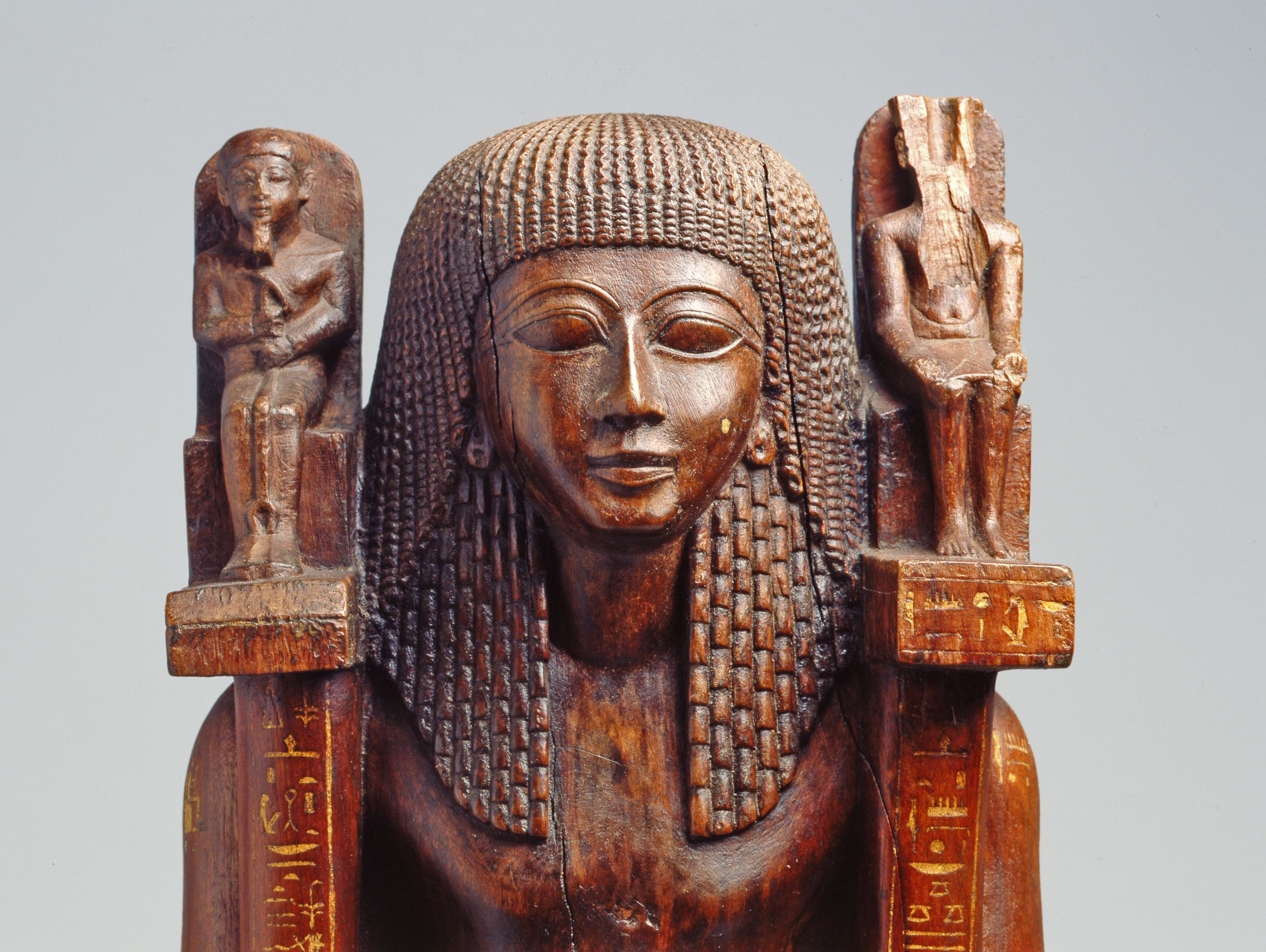
Standard-bearing wooden statue of Penbui, detail. Museo Egizio, Turin (C. 3048).

p n b w i i and D28 Z1 Aa18 Z1
Penbuy and Kasa
in hieroglyphs
Era: New Kingdom
(1550–1069 BC)

The Theban Tomb TT10 is located in Deir el-Medina, part of the Theban Necropolis, on the west bank of the Nile, opposite Luxor. It is the burial place of the ancient Egyptian artisan (his exact title was Servant in the Place of Truth) named Penbuy, who lived during the 19th Dynasty. Penbuy shared his tomb with Kasa, also a Servant in the Place of Truth.

The relation between the interred is disputed. From the evidence of stela Turin (N. 50037) it has been argued that Kasa was the son of Penbuy. However, the text in question refers most likely not to Penbuy, but to a woman, saying Kasa is her son. The relationship between Penbuy and Kasa likely comes through Penbuy's first wife Amentetwosret. It is not clear however if Amentetwosret was Kasa's sister or daughter.

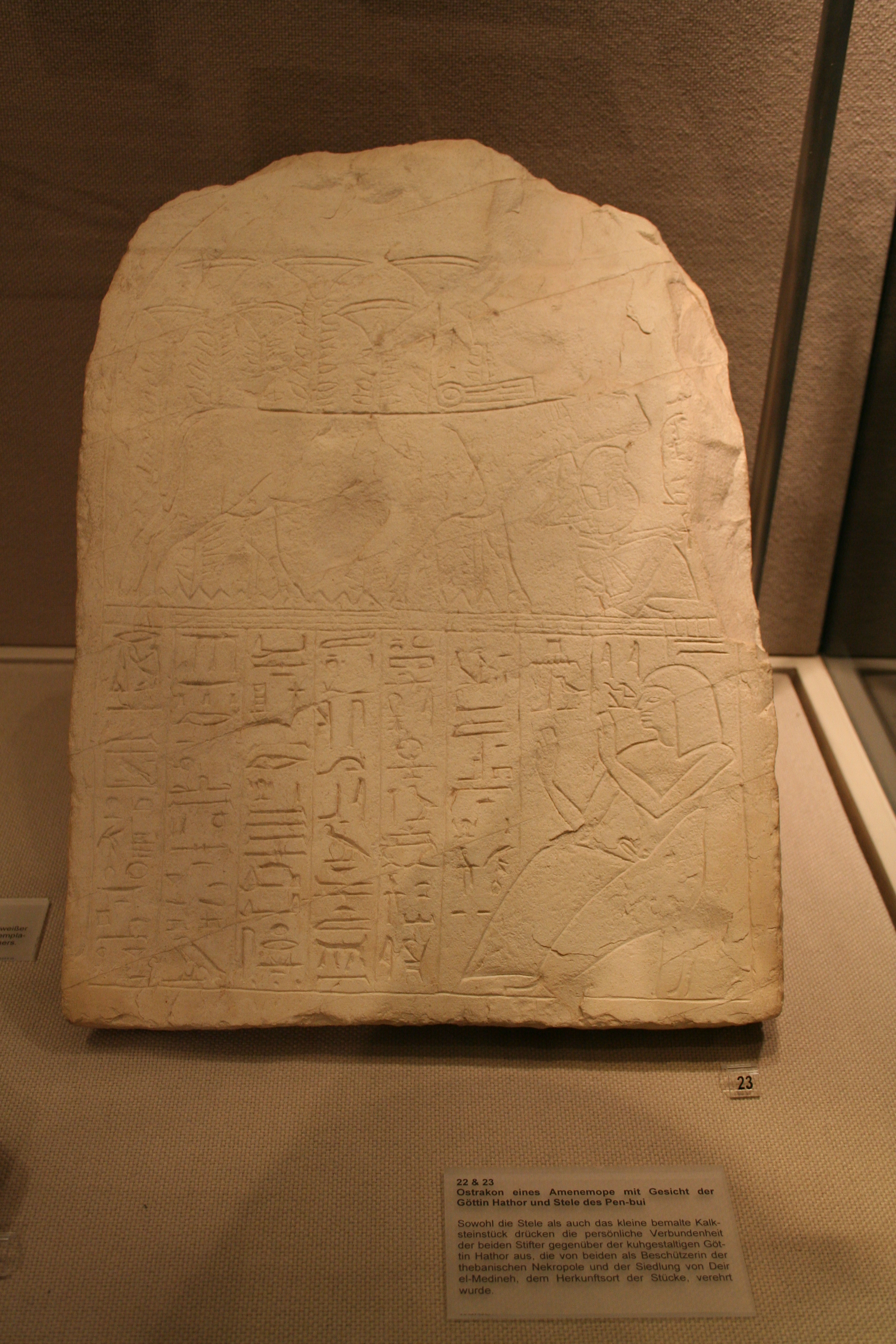
Steles of Penbui, Ägyptisches Museum Leipzig

== Tomb ==
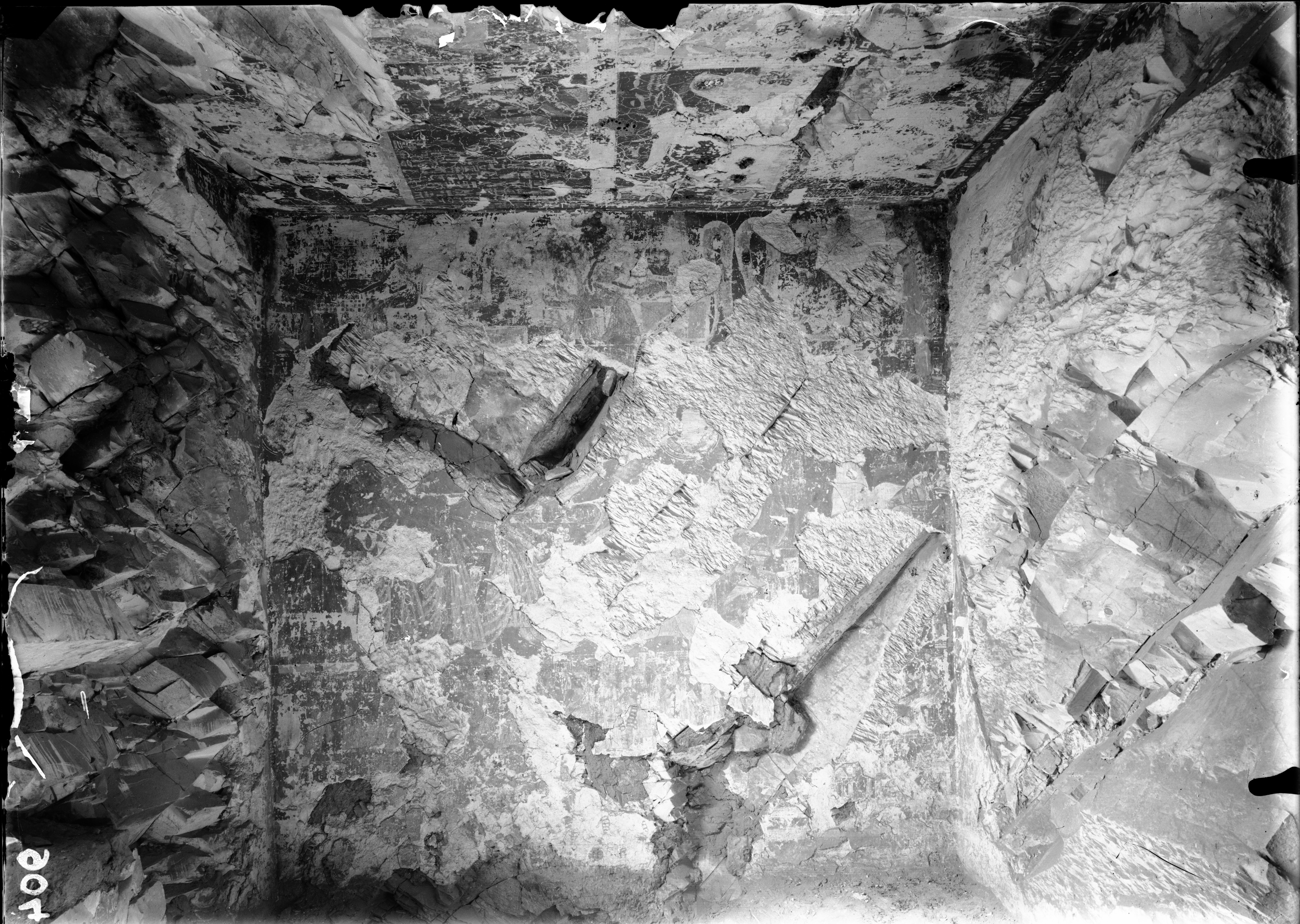
Wall from the antechamber of the tomb of Penbuy and Kasa (TT10), during Schiaparelli's excavations in 1905-1914.

The left side of the chapel shows several scenes of people offering to seated couples. Many of the names are illegible however. The right side of the chapel shows a scene depicting Kasa and his wife Bukha'nef with a daughter. In another register the tomb, four mummies and a funeral procession are depicted. The mummies seem to be Kasa, his son Nebamentet, his wife Bukha'nef and a lady of the house named Hathor. A son named Neferemsenut and a daughter named Sheritre are depicted standing before the mummies. In another scene a son of Kassa named Ptahmose is mentioned. Ptahmose's wife is named Sheritre.

On the ceiling of the chapel inscriptions again identify Kasa and his wife Bukha'nef, while another mentions Penbuy and his wife Amentet-wosret.

In the innerchapel Penbuy and his brother Penshen'abu are shown before Amenhotep I. Ahmose Nefertari and the pharaohs Sethi I, Ramesses I and Horemheb. In a nearby scene Ramesses II and the vizier Paser are shown offering to Ptah and Hathor.

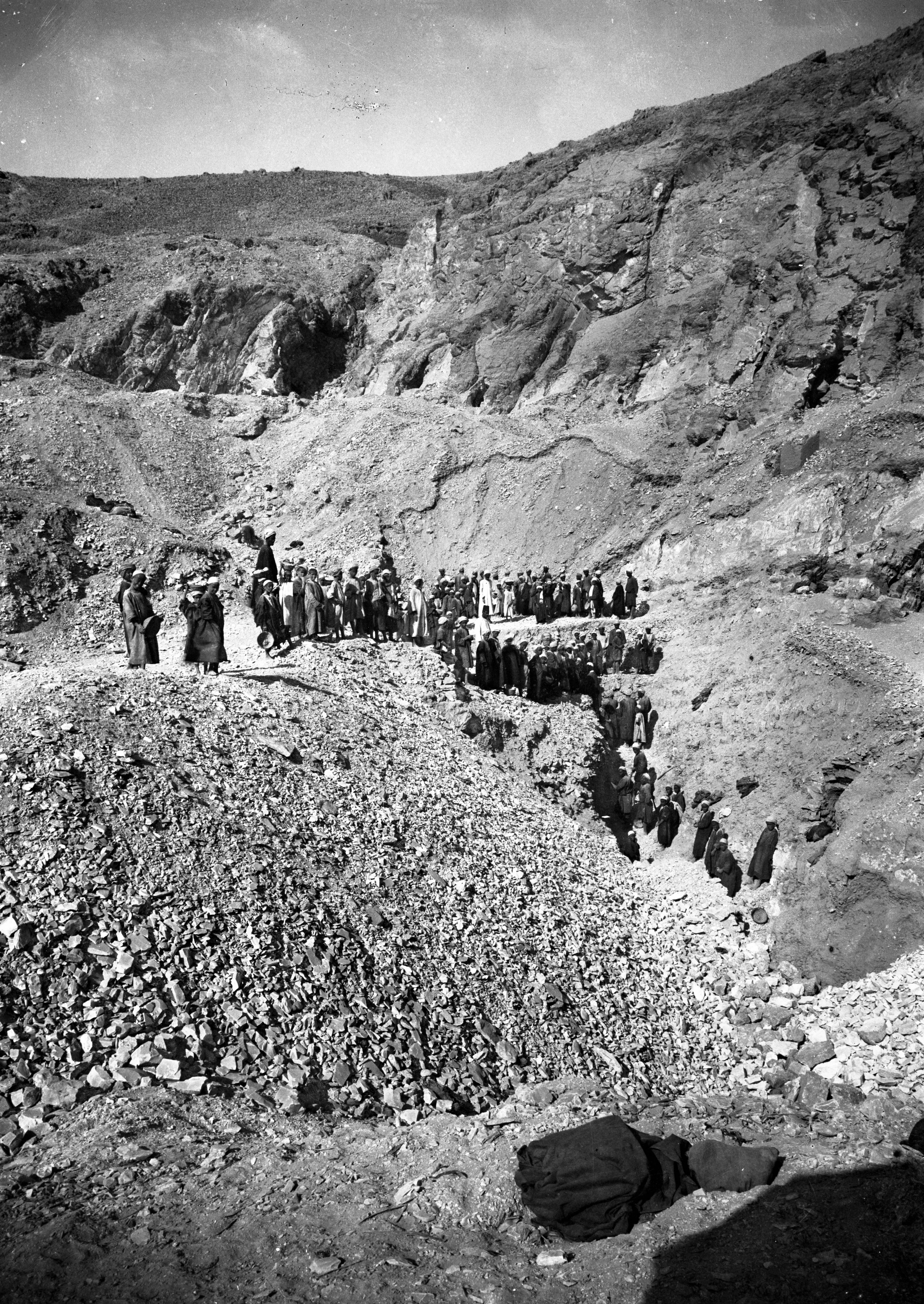
Excavations in the northern area of the necropolis, 1906. Above in the background, the entrance of the tomb TT10.

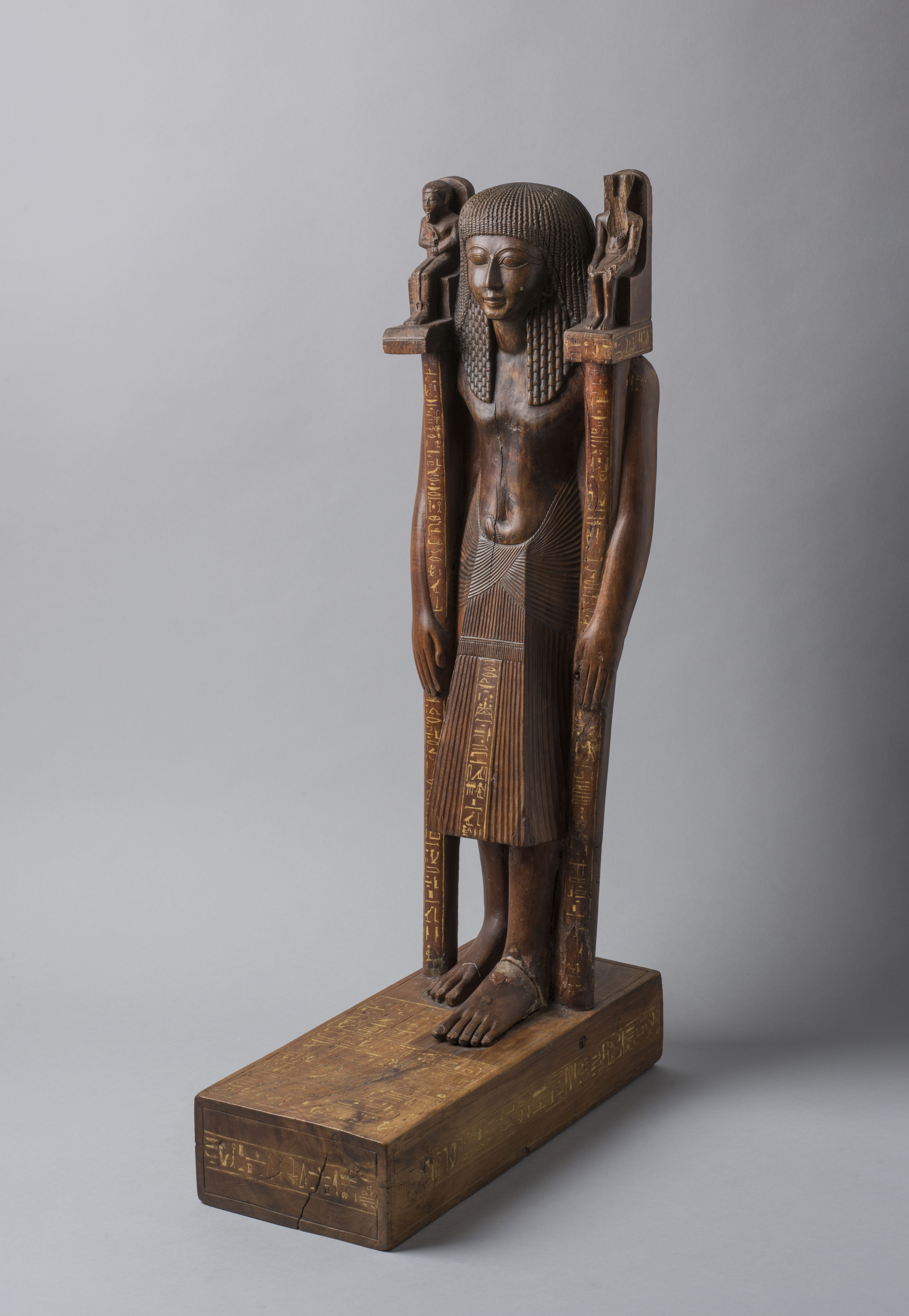
Standard-bearing statue Penbui (C. 3048)

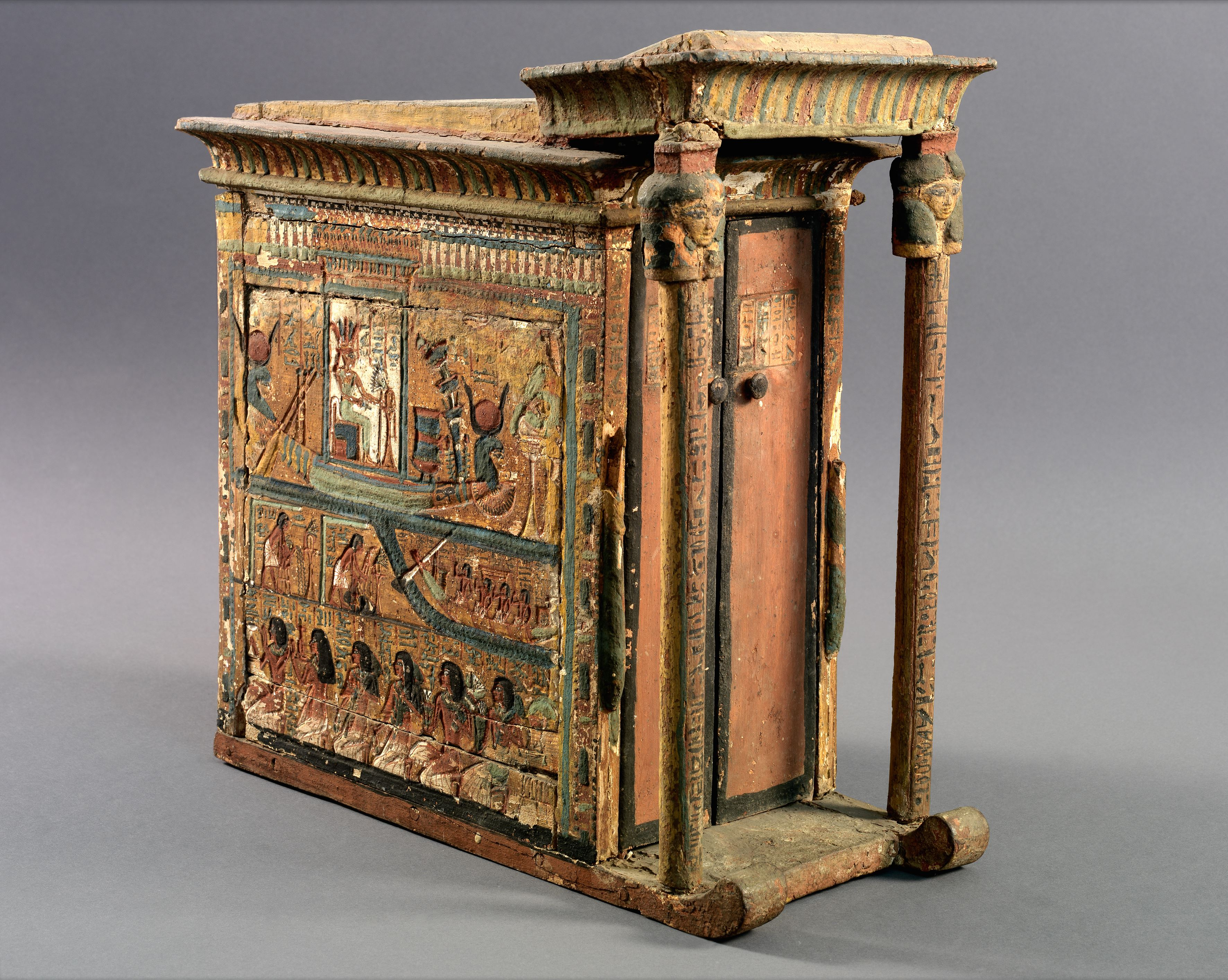
Votive naos of Kasa, Museo Egizio, Turin (C. 2446).

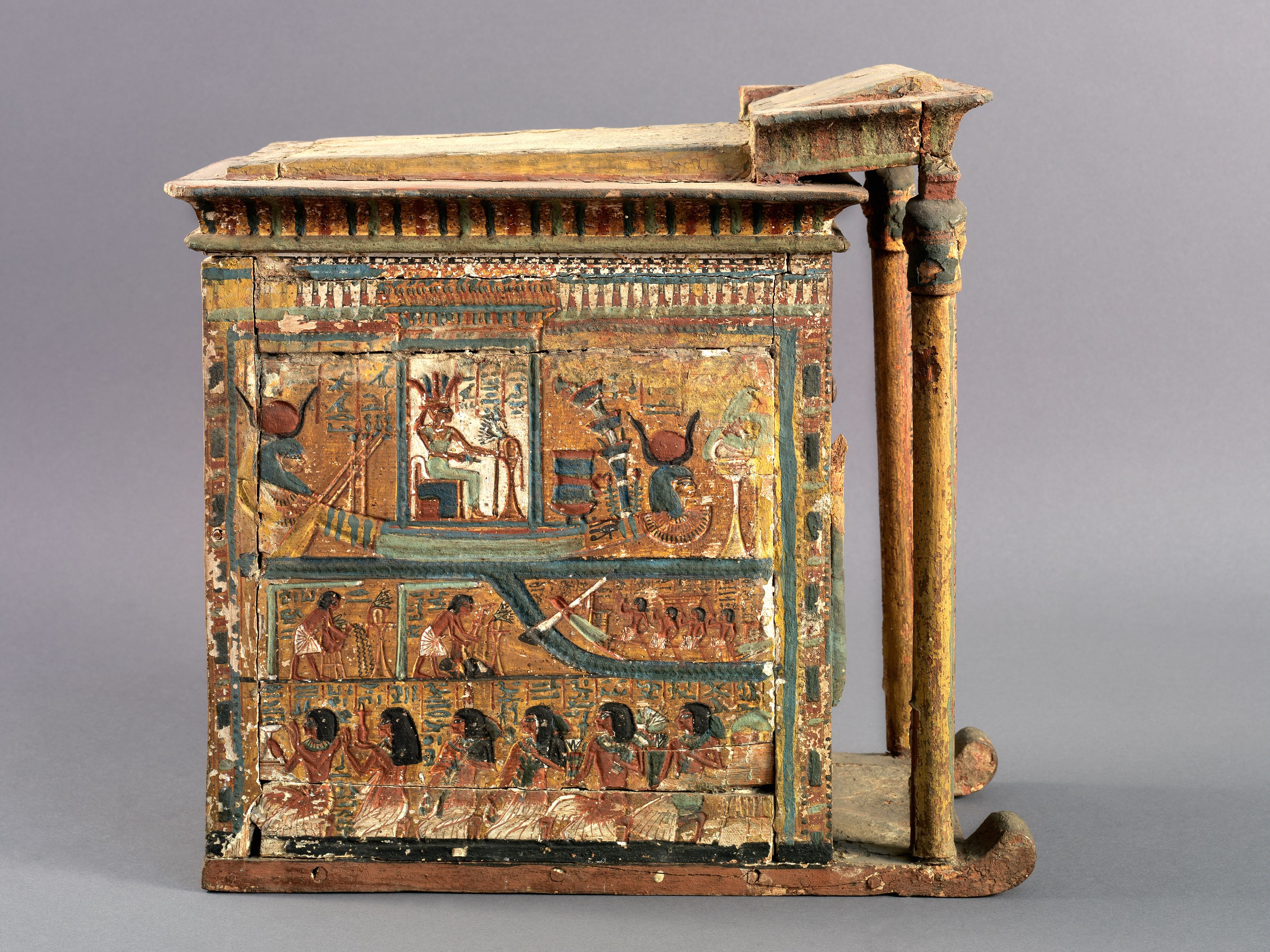
Votive naos of Kasa

== See also ==
- List of Theban tombs
- N. de Garis Davies, Nina and Norman de Garis Davies, Egyptologists
