= TT3 =

Ancient Egyptian tomb

Coordinates: 25.7333°N 32.6000°E

Theban tomb TT3
- Burial site of Pashedu
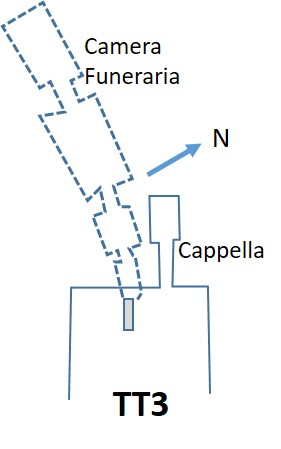
- Floor plan of TT3

- Location within Egypt
- Location: Deir el-Medina, Theban Necropolis
- ← Previous; TT2 Next → TT4

G40 A V22 d V1 D40
Pashedu
in hieroglyphs
Era: New Kingdom
(1550–1069 BC)

The Theban Tomb TT3 is located in Deir el-Medina, part of the Theban Necropolis, on the west bank of the Nile, opposite to Luxor. It is the burial place of the ancient Egyptian artisan (his exact title was Servant in the Place of Truth), Pashedu and his family.

Pashedu was a son of Menna and Huy. His wife was named Nedjmet-behdet. Pashedu was also owner of TT326.

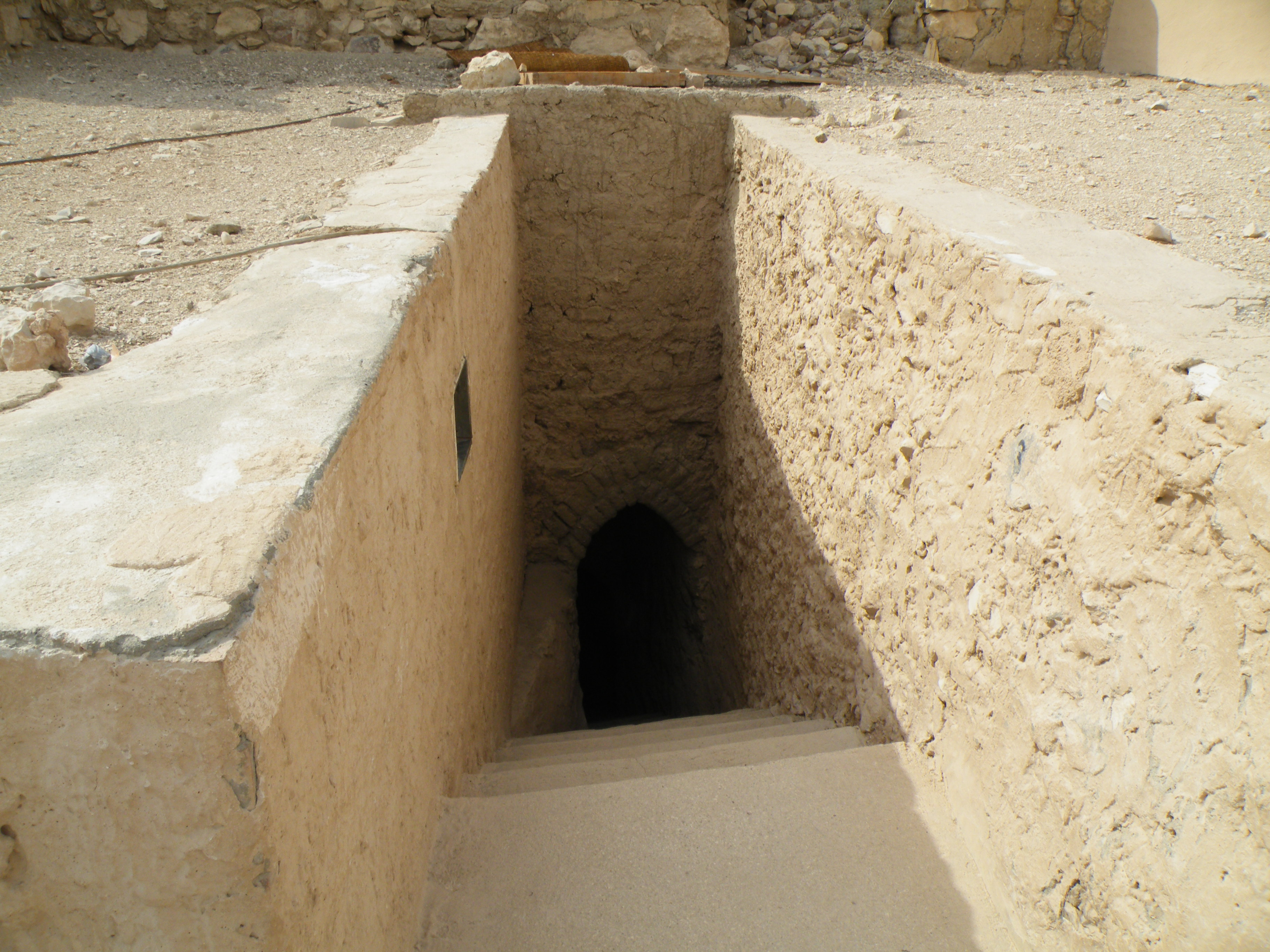
The entrance to TT3, the tomb of Pashedu

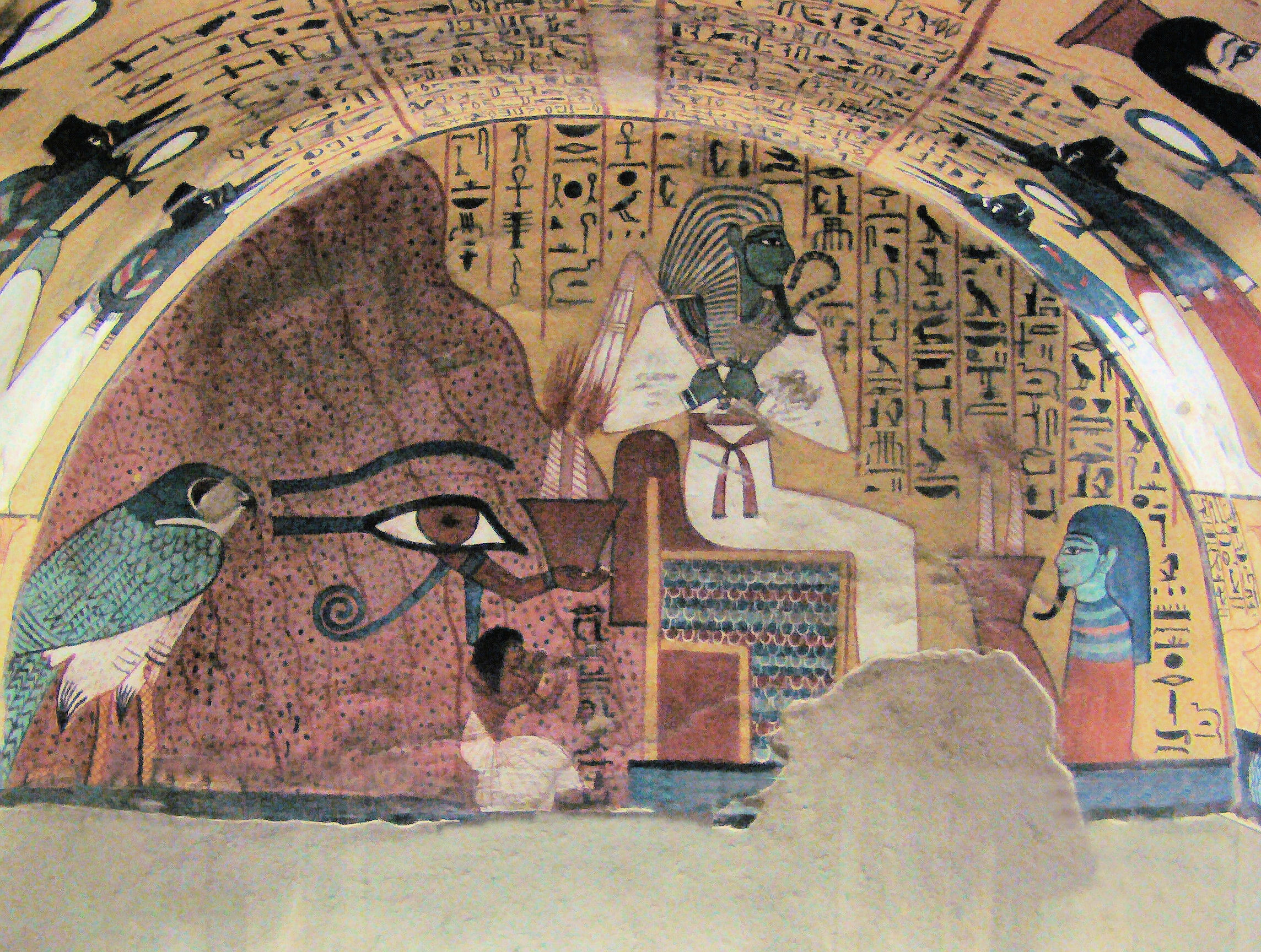
The god Osiris sitting on a throne flanked by Pashedu, who is kneeling in prayer. Behind Pashedu is a Wadjet eye holding a vessel, beyond whom is a falcon.

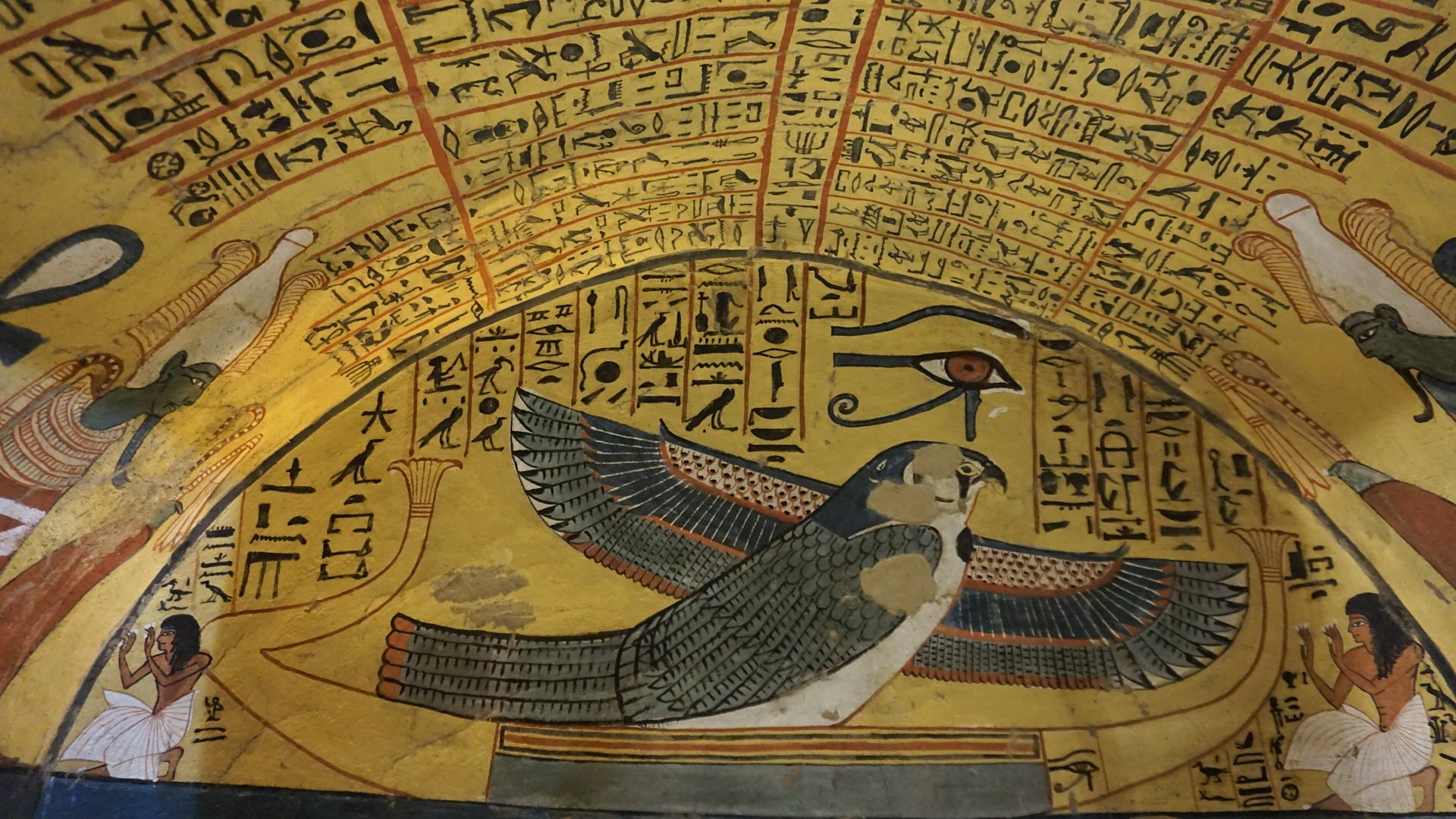
An opposite view of Pashedu's tomb

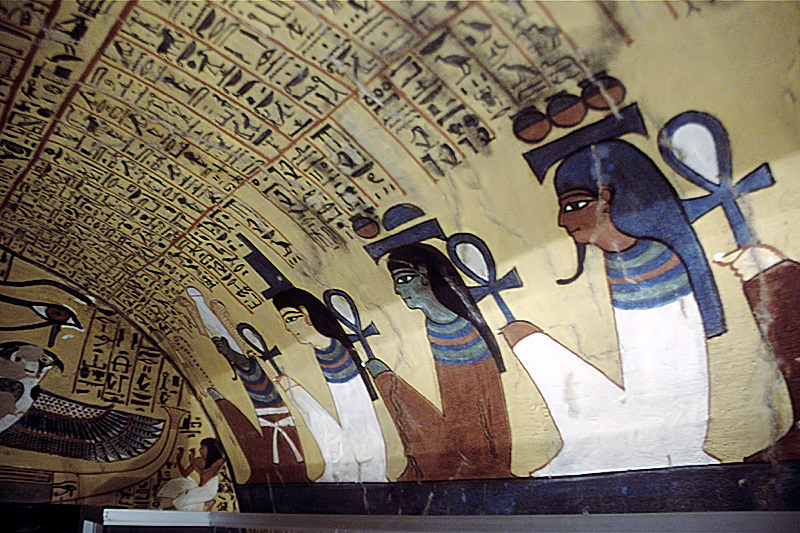
A row of deities holding ankhs depicted on the upper left wall of the tomb

== See also ==
- List of Theban tombs
