= Qen =

q n D40
Qen
in hieroglyphs
Era: New Kingdom
(1550–1069 BC)

Qen was an Ancient Egyptian artisan. Qen lived in Deir el-Medina on the west bank of the Nile, opposite Thebes, during the reigns of Ramesses II. His titles included Servant in the Place of Truth, meaning that he worked on the excavation and decoration of nearby royal tombs. He was buried in a tomb in the village necropolis.

Qen provided for many monuments in and around Deir el-Medina. A scene in his tomb depicting Ramesses II and his Vizier Paser dates Qen to the early part of the reign of Ramesses II.

== Family ==
Qen was a son of Thonufer (or Tjanufer) (Chiseller of Amun in the Khenu) and Lady Maetnefert. In the tomb two wives are mentioned:

- Nefertari was the mother of a daughter named Taqari and a son named Merymery (sometimes called Meryre). Nefertari may also have been the mother of a son named Huy. In TT4 Nefertari is said to be Qen's dear and always favorite lover, Lady of the house and favored one of Hathor. Nefertari is the daughter of Qen And Wadjetrenpet. A stela from Deir el-Medina (no. 320) has an interesting text with Qen stating that: "I am a man who went on oath falsely, because of the lady of the house Nefertari, justified. The divine wrath befell (me).." It's not clear what Qen was untruthful about as the rest of the text is damaged.
- Henutmehyt was the mother of Tjau-en-Huy, Kewer and Pendua(u), and of Huyemtjebutyfy(i), Baki(iv), and Khaemwaset(i)

Qen had at least seven (possibly nine) children:

- Taqari is the only known daughter. She is depicted before Qen and Nefertari and was likely Nefertari's daughter. Taqari is shown offering ointment to her parents in TT4. In another scene she is depicted as a female mourner before her parents.
- Merymery (or Meryre) is a sculptor. He is said to be a son of Nefertari. He is shown censing/libating before the bier in the funeral procession.
- Pendua(u) is a son of Henutmehyt. He takes part in the funeral procession and is shown with a naos. A record of a bequest of slaves from Qen to Pendua has been preserved. Qen lists ca. ten slaves he had inherited form his mother Maatnofret. Qen states that the slaves must go to his son Pendua "who has been good to him" and not to any of his other children.
- Tjau-en-Huy (or Tjau-en-Anuy) was a son of Henutmehyt. He is depicted several times in TT4 and participates in the funeral procession. He is depicted on a Stela now in Turin (N 50074).
- Huy may be another name for Tjau-en-huy or another son. Huy is mentioned on a stela now in the Copenhagen National Museum (B.3.) The stela is dedicated to Qen and Nefertari, and Huy may be another son of Nefertari. The Turin stela mentions both Tjau-en-huy and Huy.
- Kawer is a son of Henutmehyt and is mentioned in TT4. Kawer also appears on the stela form Turin, together with his brother Tjau-en-huy.
- Huyemtjebutyfy(i), a sculptor. Son of Henutmehyt
- Baki(iv), a sculptor. Son of Henutmehyt
- Khaemwaset(i) is either a son of Qen and Henutmehyt, or a son of Wennefer and Mutemopet.

== Other objects ==
- Theban tomb TT337 The sculptor Qen is depicted in the entryway
- Table of Offerings from TT4 The text mentions Qen and both his wives Nefertari and Henut-mehyt.
- Table of Offerings (Cairo CGC 23075) Inscriptions mention Nefertari and Qen.
- Pillar base with scene related to the cult of Amenhotep I. Qen is stated to be the servitor of Djoserkare. He is accompanied by his son Huy and ten more priests.
- Votive group of nine Smen-geese (Hildesheim Museum No. 4544) said to be made by the Sculptor of Amun Qen.
- Request of Slaves' services to Son (O. gardiner 90) Note to declare that the servants of Qen's mother Maatnofret are given to his son Pendua, and not to any of his other children.
- Statement of property (ODM 239)A list of property that passed from the hands of the sculptor Qen into the hands of the citizeness Isis. The list includes bronze bowls, pots and utensils as well as wooden stools, vessels, measures and a coffin.
- Stela (Copenhagen National Museum B3 - AA.d.11) Son Merymery offers before Qen and his wife Nefertari. Sons Merymery and Huy appear before the mummies of their parents.
- Stela (Turin N 50074 - Old Cat 1635) Funerary Stela with mention of deities Isis, Nephtys, Re and Re-Harakhty.
- Stela (New York MMA 59.93 Dedicated to Amenhotep I and Ahmose Nefertari. Qen and his wife Nefertari are accompanied by their sons Merymery and Huy.
- Stela (Deir el-Medina No 320) Qen states: "I am a man who went on oath falsely because of the Lady of the House Nefertari, justified. The divine wrath befell me, I spoke to the Sun, to <...> and to the Moon, to Ptah, Thoth and Amun: Be merciful on me .."
- Stela (Turin Cat 1634 - Old no. 323) Seated man before offerings.
- Stela (British Museum BM 815) Qen adoring Osiris, Amenhotep I and the Hathor-cow. The stela mentions Nefertari, and their son Huy.
- Stela of Son Pendua (Turin N 50040 Old Cat 1565) Goddesses named Neret-iiti and Irytnufer are depicted seated and facing each other. Qen is mentioned along Pendua and other relatives of his son.
- Stela of Son Tjau-en-anuy (DM No 19)
- Stela fragments from Deir el-Medina mention Nefertari, Henutmehyt, Qen and some of the children.
- Shabti and shabti-box fragments with the name of Qen.
