= TT4 =

Ancient Egyptian tomb

Coordinates: 25.7333°N 32.6000°E

Theban tomb TT4
- Burial site of Qen
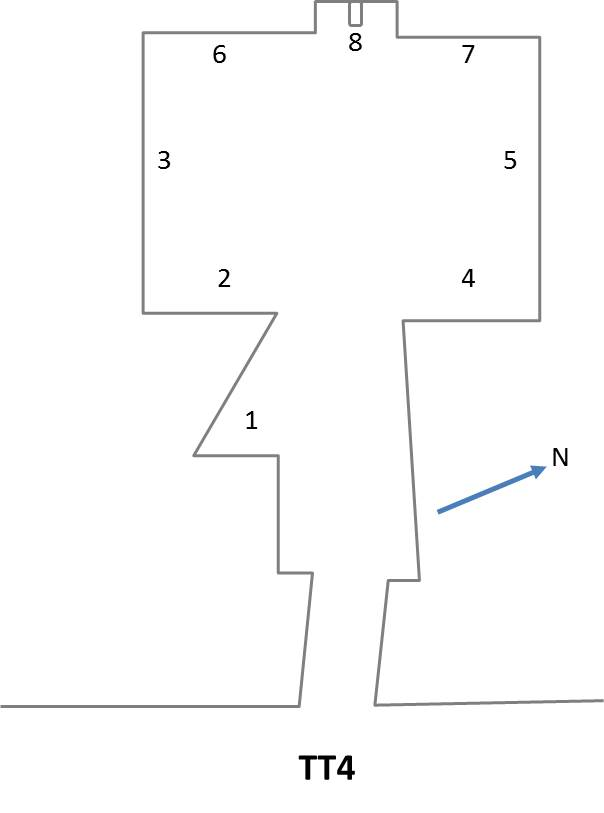

- Location within Egypt
- Location: Deir el-Medina, Theban Necropolis
- ← Previous; TT3 Next → TT5

q n D40
Qen
in hieroglyphs
Era: New Kingdom
(1550–1069 BC)

The Theban Tomb TT4 is located in Deir el-Medina, part of the Theban Necropolis, on the west bank of the Nile, opposite to Luxor. It is the burial place of the ancient Egyptian artisan (his exact title was Servant in the Place of Truth) named Qen.

Also mentioned in the tomb are Paser (owner of TT106) and Ramose (owner of TT7). Qen is also the owner of TT337, which was usurped in the 21st or 22nd Dynasty.

== Hall ==
A son named Merymery is shown officiating before Qen and his wife the Lady of the house Nefertari. Qen and Nefertari are accompanied by their daughter Taqari. On another wall Qen is depicted with a wife named Henutmehyt, and they are accompanied by their sons, Tjau-en-anuy, Kewer and Penduau. In another register Qen and his parents the sculptor Tjanufer and Maatnofret are shown worshipping Ptah and Maat. On the west wall Qen and his wife Henutmehyt in the company of their son Tjau-en-anuy worship Anubis, Hathor, and the deified Amenhotep I and Ahmose Nefertari. Also on the west wall is a niche dedicated to the Hathor-cow and Amenhotep I. They are flanked by Queen Ahmose-Nefertari and the King's sister Ahmose-Meritamun. That same wall also contains an scene where Qen accompanies Ramesses II, Vizier Paser and the royal scribe Ramose. The King is shown offering to the god Horus.

The South wall scenes of Qen with family and friends. Qen and both his wives are shown on a Barque, attended by their sons Merymery and Tjau-en-anuy. Another register shows Qen's sons Huy and Kewer offering to eight couples. Only the names of the first four have been preserved:

1. Qen and his wife Nefertari;
2. His parents Tjanufer and Maatnofret;
3. Her parents Qen and Wadjyt-ronpet;
4. Her brother Huy and his wife Iuy.

The south wall further depicts the funeral procession including the mummies and mourners before the tomb.

== See also ==
- List of Theban tombs
