= Servant in the Place of Truth =

Title for necropolis workers in ancient Egypt

sDm Aa15 a N37 Aa15 Q1 H6
Servant in the Place of Truth
in hieroglyphs
Era: New Kingdom
(1550–1069 BC)

sḏm-ꜥš m st mꜣꜥt, usually translated as Servant in the Place of Truth is an ancient Egyptian title that is used to refer to someone who worked in the Theban Necropolis, on the west bank of the Nile in Thebes. Set-Maat (Ancient Egyptian: st mꜣꜥt "Place of Truth") was the name of the workmen's settlement today known as Deir el-Medina. Several artisans had nicely decorated tombs here.

== Notable persons and their tombs ==
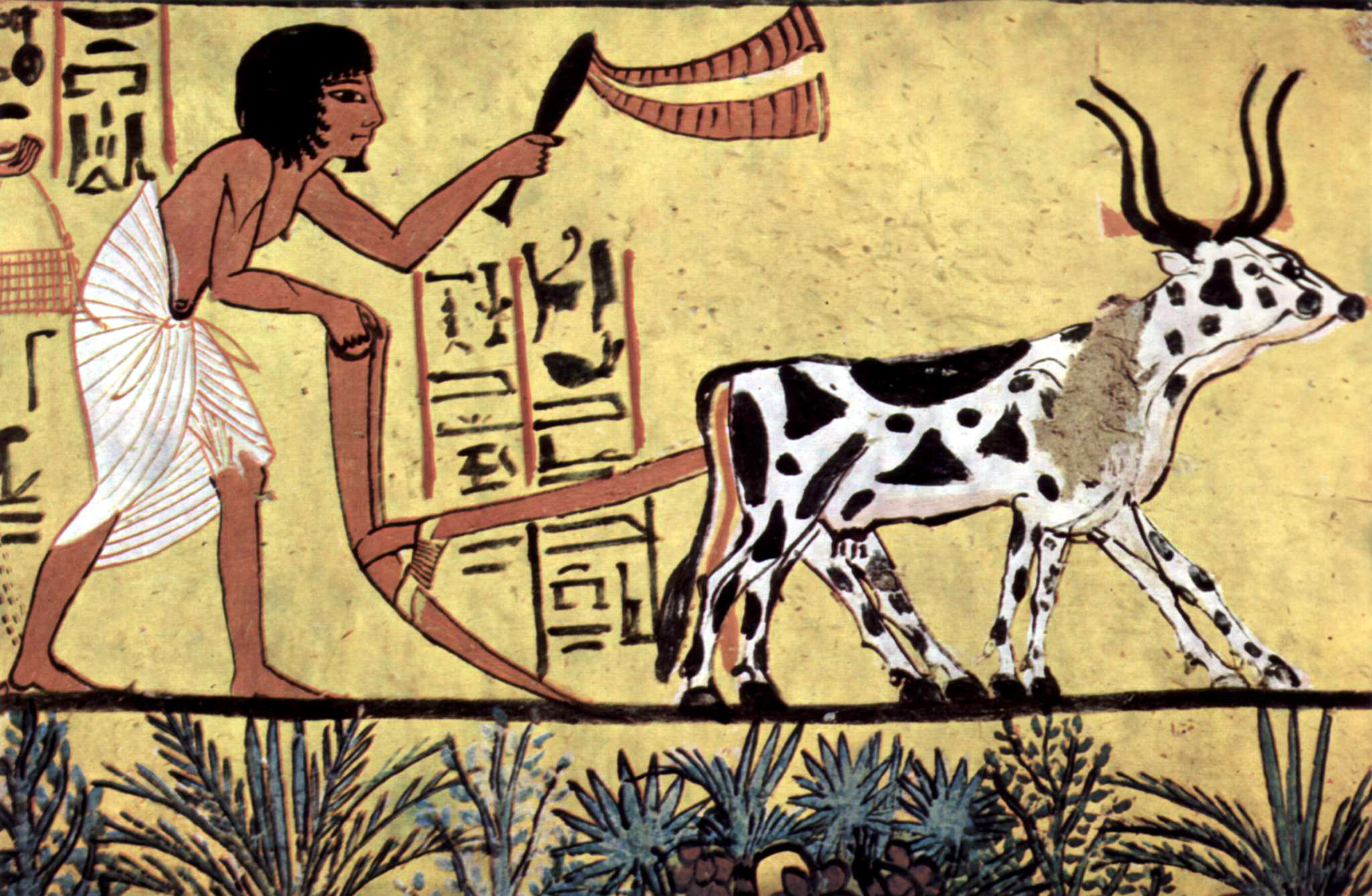
Scene from Sennedjem's tomb

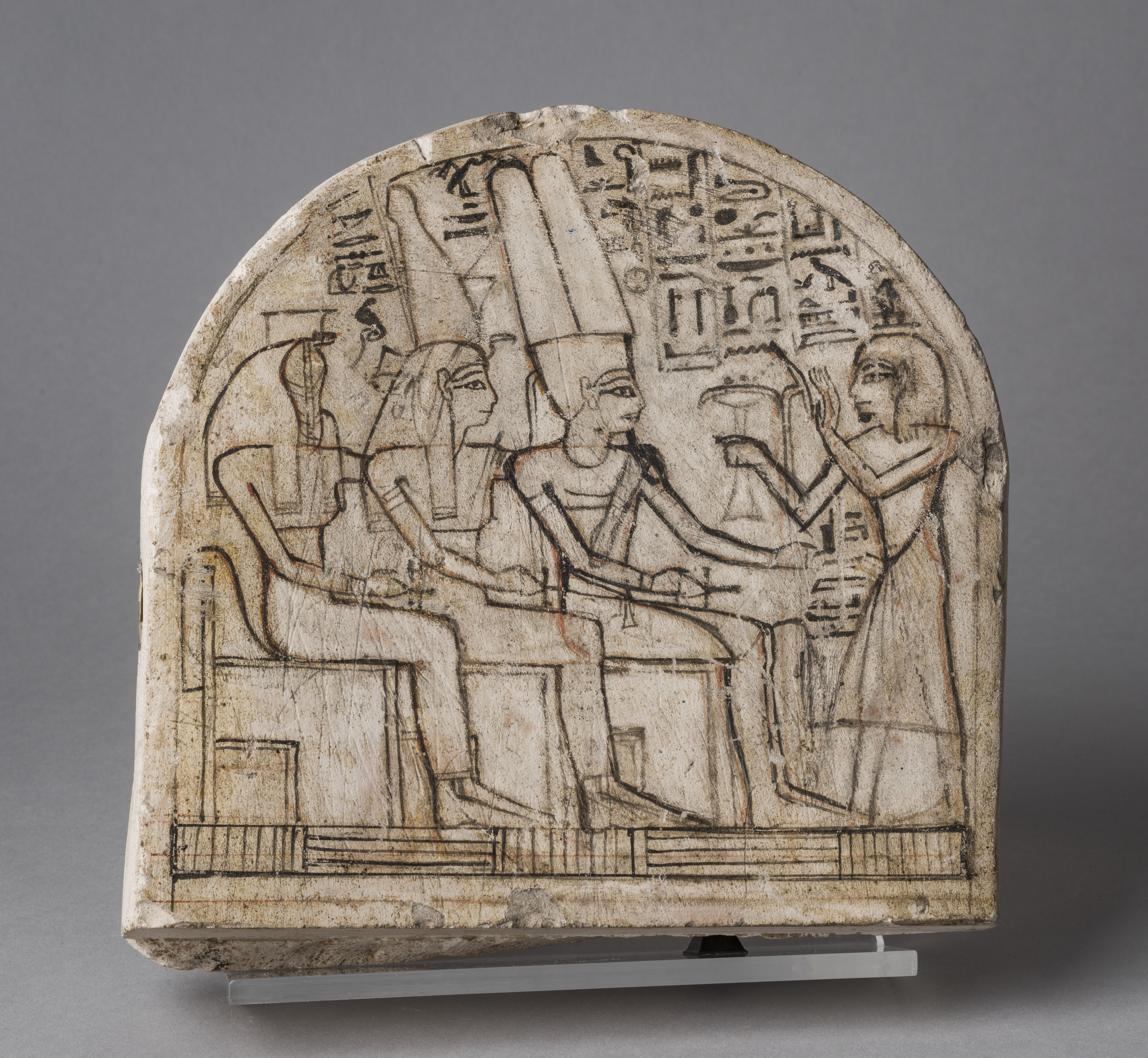
Fragment of an unfinished stela: offering of the Servant of the Place of Truth Mahu, to the gods Amun, Mut and Meretseger. Limestone, red and black inks. 1292-1190 BC, New Kingdom. Museo Egizio, Turin (Coll. 1580).

- Amenmose – TT9
- Khabekhnet – TT2
- Khawy – TT214
- Neferabet – TT5
- Pashedu – TT3
- Penamun – TT213
- Penbuy and Kasa – TT10
- Qen – TT4
- Sennedjem – TT1
- Sennefer – 1159a
