= Sennefer (Deir el-Medina) =

Ancient Egyptian official

- Servant in the Place of Truth
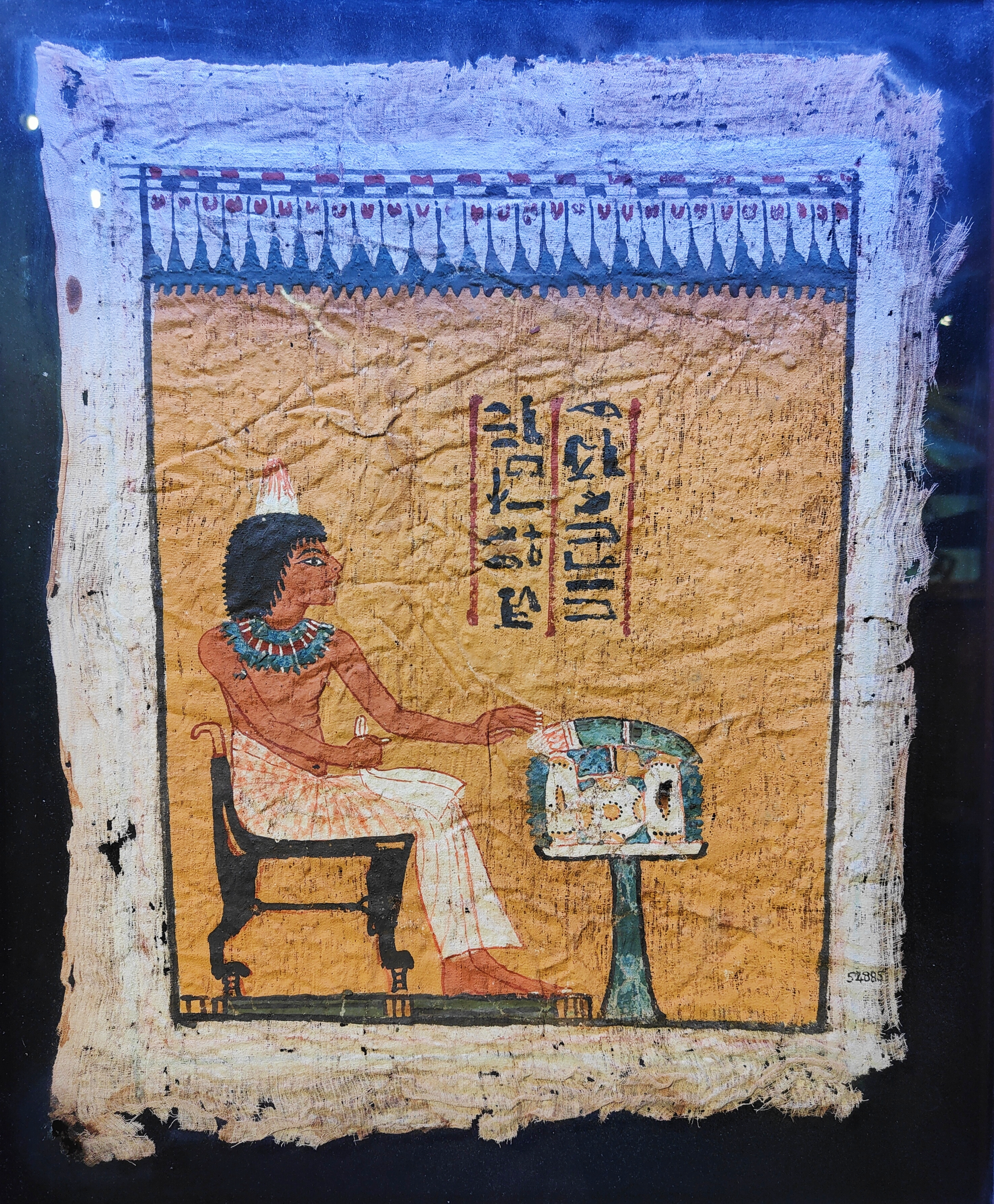
- Sennefer depicted receiving offerings in a painted scene found atop his shrouded coffin
Egyptian name
T22 n nfr f r
- Dynasty: 18th Dynasty
- Pharaoh: Tutankhamun?
- Burial: DM1159A, Deir el-Medina
- Spouse: Nefertiti

Sennefer was an Ancient Egyptian official with the title "Servant in the Place of Truth" at the end of the 18th Dynasty. He is mainly known due to his unlooted burial found in 1928 by excavations under Bernard Bruyère at Deir el-Medina. The burial chamber of Sennefer was found within the tomb of the servant at the place of truth Hormes (tomb no. 1159a). The small chamber contained the inscribed coffins of Sennefer and his wife Nefertiti. Both were found wrapped in linen. Sennefer was also adorned with a mummy mask. He had a heart scarab and was adorned with a pectoral. On his coffin was placed a painted piece of cloth, showing Sennefer before an offering table. Furthermore, the burial contained different types of furniture, including a bed, a box, a head rest and several pottery as well as stone vessels. The burial of a child in an undecorated box was found, too. Two shabti figures are datable by style to the end of the 18th Dynasty.

== Life ==
nfr M18 i t D54
Nefertiti
in hieroglyphs
Era: New Kingdom
(1550–1069 BC)

Little is known about Sennefer. He was titled "servant in the Place of Truth" which indicates that he worked on the cutting and decorating of royal tombs in the Valley of the Kings. He lived during the late 18th Dynasty; his burial is usually assigned to the reign of Tutankhamun based on the style of his coffins and funerary goods. Analysis of his skeletonised mummy indicates he was about 162–168 centimetres (5 ft 4 in – 5 ft 6 in) tall and died between 35 and 45 years of age. He had healed fractures to his wrist and a rib, a dent across the top of his head from an old injury, and many of his vertebrae have signs of osteoarthritis. His right arm is 1 centimetre (0.39 in) longer than his left.

Sennefer was buried with a woman named Nefertiti (also transcribed Neferiyt) who is thought to be his wife. Examination of her body estimated she died between the ages of 18 and 20. The infant interred with them is assumed to be their child; the baby died at approximately 9 months old.

== Tomb ==
=== Architecture ===
The tomb of Sennefer is located in Deir el-Medina's western cemetery, inside the tomb of Harmose (DM1159). The entrance to Sennefer's burial chamber, numbered 1159A, is cut into the floor against the western wall of Harmose's burial chamber. It consists of a descending staircase 1.70 metres (5.6 ft) deep that leads to an arched doorway 1.25 metres (4.1 ft) tall which opens to the west onto a roughly-cut rock chamber 1.9 metres (6.2 ft) high. The single room is almost square, with the walls measuring between 2.35 metres (7.7 ft) and 3 metres (9.8 ft) long.

The order of the tomb's ownership is debated. Sennefer is thought to have been the tomb's original owner, but he seems to have died without a living heir. Harmose, possibly a relative, inherited the tomb. Alternatively, Egyptologist Jaroslav Černý suggested Sennefer took over the tomb from Harmose.

=== Discovery and clearance ===
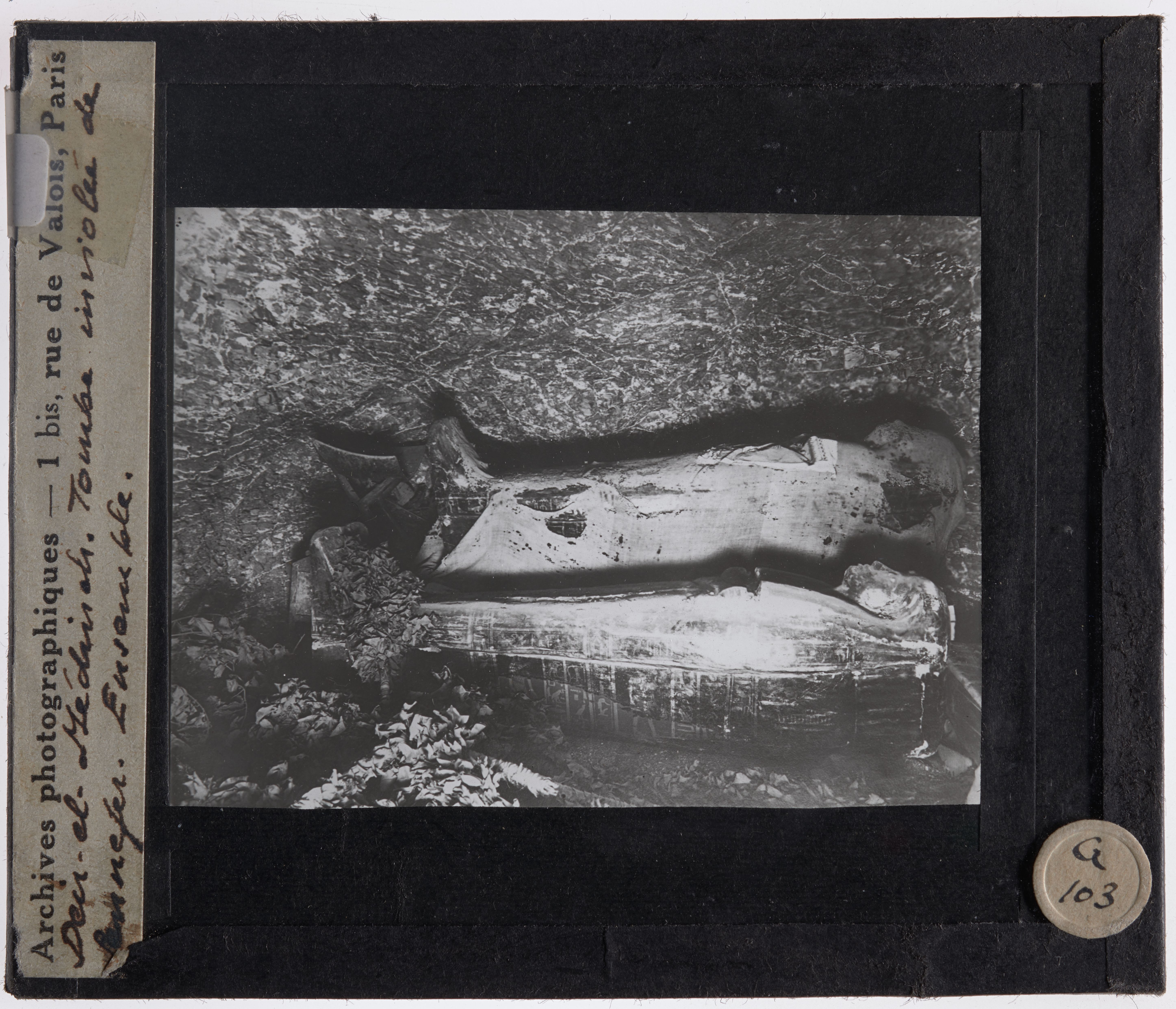
Tomb of Sennefer at the time of its official opening

Sennefer's intact tomb was discovered on 1 February 1928 by workmen supervised by George Nagel in excavations conducted by the Institut Français d'Archéologie Orientale (IFAO) and led by the French Egyptologist Bernard Bruyère. They were clearing the second (southernmost) of two shafts sunk into the floor of Harmose's burial chamber; the first (northern) shaft was found to be unfinished, consisting only of a shaft measuring 1.25 metres (4.1 ft) deep, and a partially cut doorway. As the door at the base of the southern shaft was uncovered, it was found entirely blocked with stacked bricks. The reis (foreman) Hassan Khalifa and his deputy Taher Hassane partly dismantled the blocking and reported to Nagel that they had found an undisturbed burial chamber. The opening was enlarged and Nagel quickly recorded the contents before resealing the blocking and refilling the shaft to await an official opening; the tomb was guarded by the reis and five of his men.

The tomb was officially opened on the morning of 7 February 1928 in the presence of Egyptologists including Pierre Lacau, director of the Antiquities Service and members of the IFAO teams. Nagel confirmed that the tomb had not been disturbed since its initial discovery; those present then entered and viewed the burial chamber. The contents were photographed, planned, and recorded in a single day before being transported to TT217 for storage; that afternoon the contents were inventoried and the mummy of Sennefer was unwrapped.

=== Contents ===
DM1159A is one of only three intact tombs discovered in Deir el-Medina. Funerary bouquets of foliage were piled near the entrance of the chamber; others were placed at the rear of the chamber. At the back of the room, taking up nearly the entire width of the tomb, were the coffins of Sennefer and Nefertiti placed side by side. Sennefer's coffin was placed on a bier (funerary bed) and covered with a shroud; on the chest was a square cloth with a painted scene of him sitting before an offering table and inscribed with his name and title. The coffin of the infant was placed in the space at the heads of the coffins. To the south, at the feet of the coffins, was a box with a pitched lid that supported a folding stool; both were once covered with a fabric shroud. Food offerings consisted of three plates of fruits, nuts and seeds, and two pottery vessels. A limestone ostraca with an offering table sketched in red ink was placed near the doorway.

Although the tomb was untouched by modern robbers and is thought to be intact, Bruyère considered it to have been anciently robbed, based on the small number of burial goods (which included disturbed objects and broken pottery), the roughly closed doorway, and parts of funerary bouquets and a broken statuette among in the shaft fill.

=== Burials ===
==== Sennefer ====
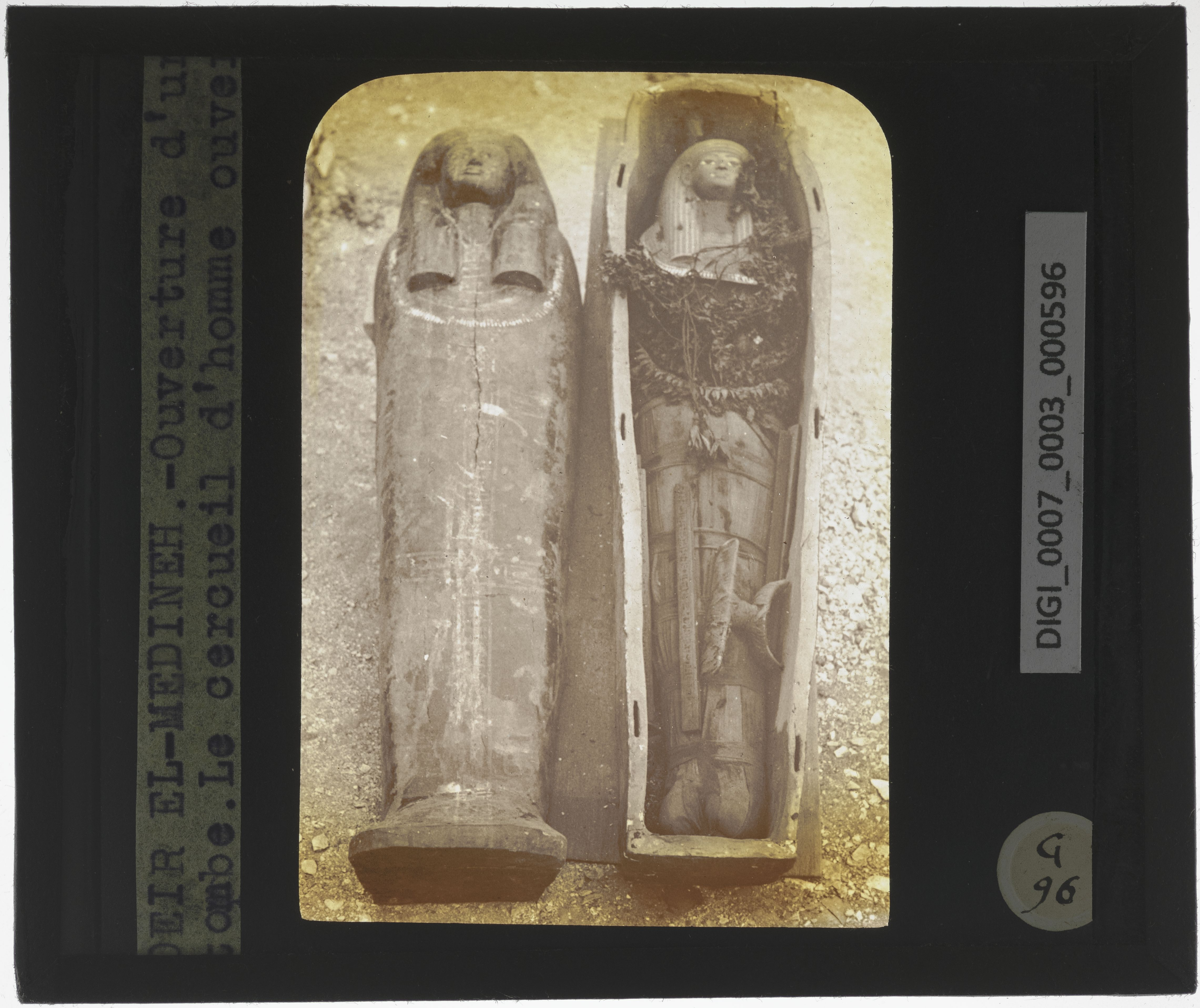
Coffined and adorned body of Sennefer

Sennefer was buried in a single wooden coffin 1.83 m (6.0 ft) long. The mummy-shaped coffin lacks hands and a curled divine beard, and depicts the deceased wearing a black and yellow-striped wig and multi-coloured broad collar. Below this is a vulture with open wings, grasping shen rings in its talons. The body of the coffin is black with vertical and horizontal bands of yellow text and figures. The goddesses Nephthys and Isis appear on the top of the head and the base of the foot respectively. The interior of the coffin is painted yellow.

His head and chest were covered by a funerary mask made of cartonnage. Despite the style of the ushabti dating the burial to the reign of Tutankhamun, the mask has features more typical of the reigns of the earlier kings Amenhotep III or Thutmose IV. On top of the chest and abdomen of his mummy were bunches of white lotuses with their stems tied in loops and three garlands made of vine and willow leaves. Beneath these was a heart scarab on a multi-stranded, multi-coloured beaded necklace; an additional pectoral-necklace had fallen beneath the body. A headrest wrapped in strips of fabric and five cubit rods were placed around his legs. At the level of his feet were five small vessels of bronze.

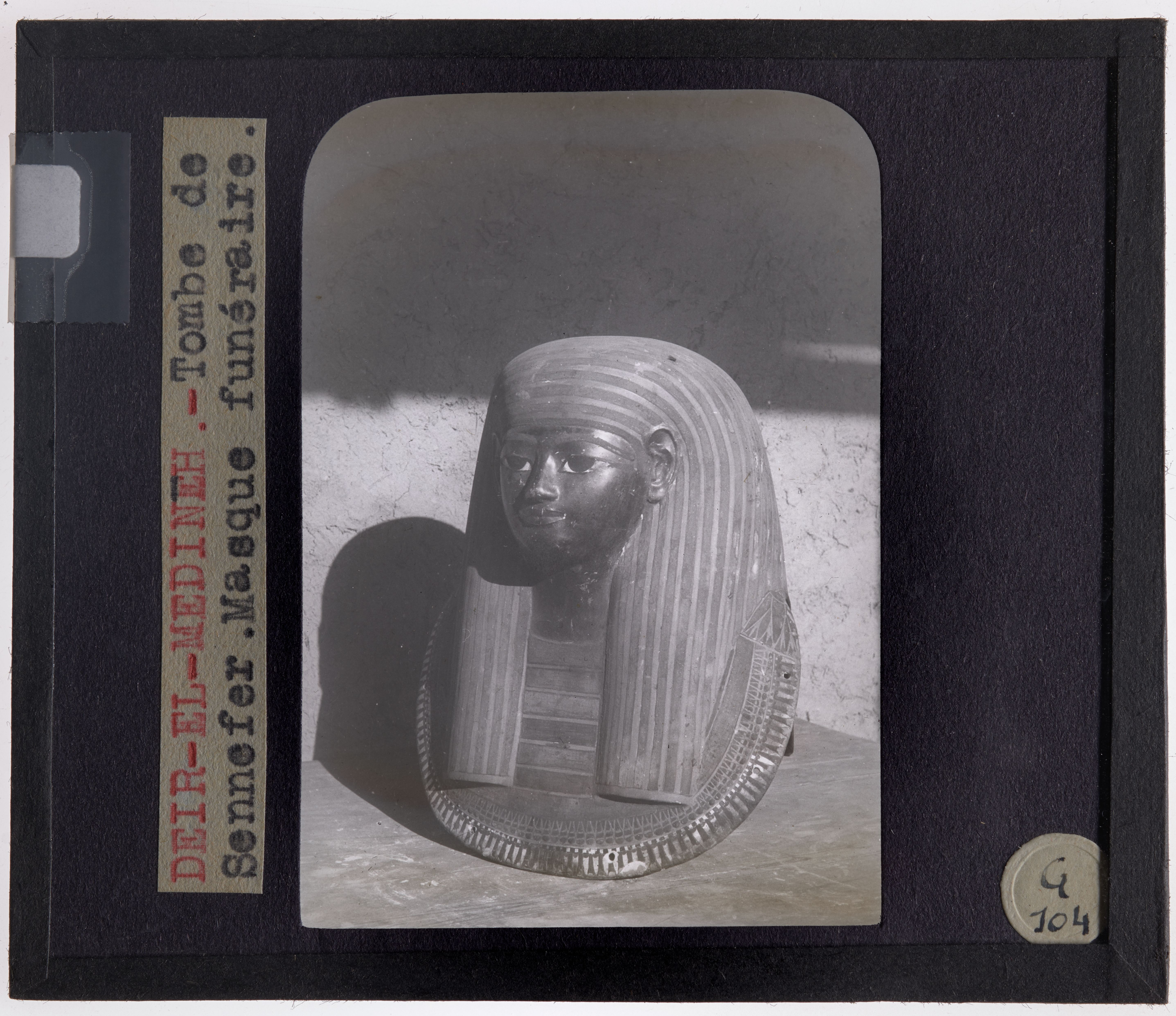
Funerary mask

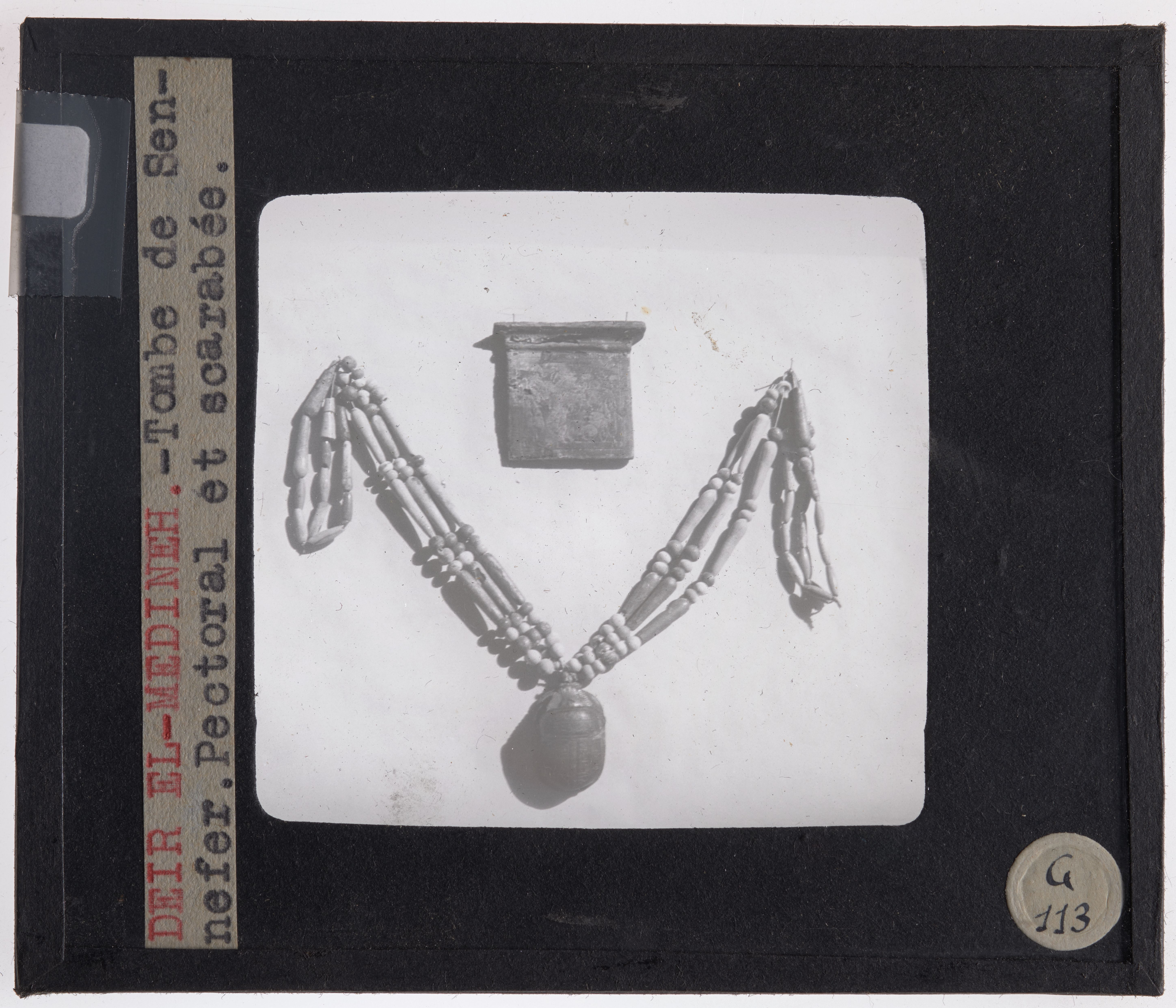
Pectoral and heart scarab

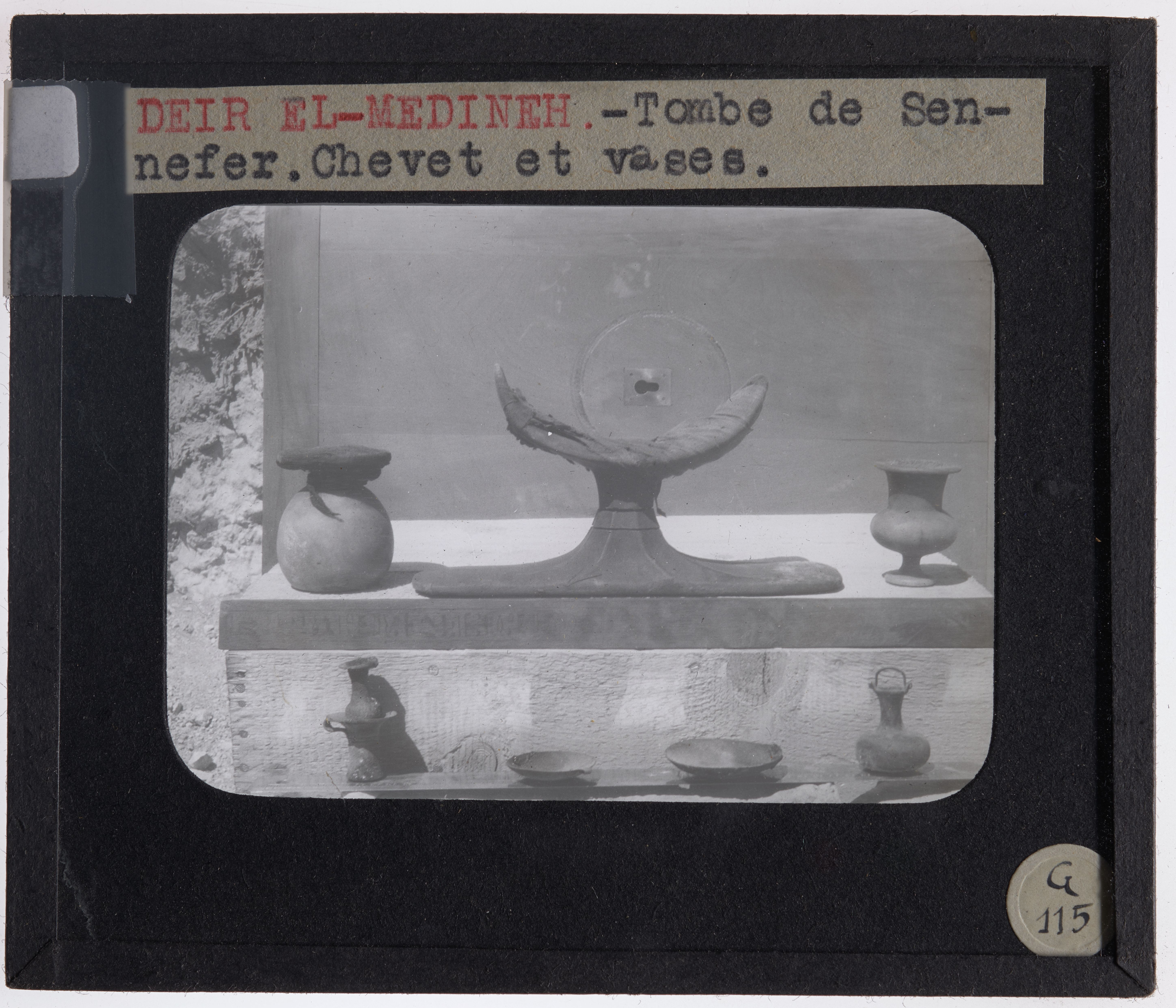
Headrest, metal and stone vessels, cubit rod

Sennefer's mummy was 166 cm (65 in) tall. His body was wrapped in seven layers of shrouds and seven layers of bandages of varying qualities of linen; the outermost shroud was stitched up the back and secured by horizontal and vertical fabric bands. Despite the careful external treatment, his body was not mummified. His remains were largely skeletonised, with very decayed and powdery organs remaining in the body cavity.

==== Nefertiti ====
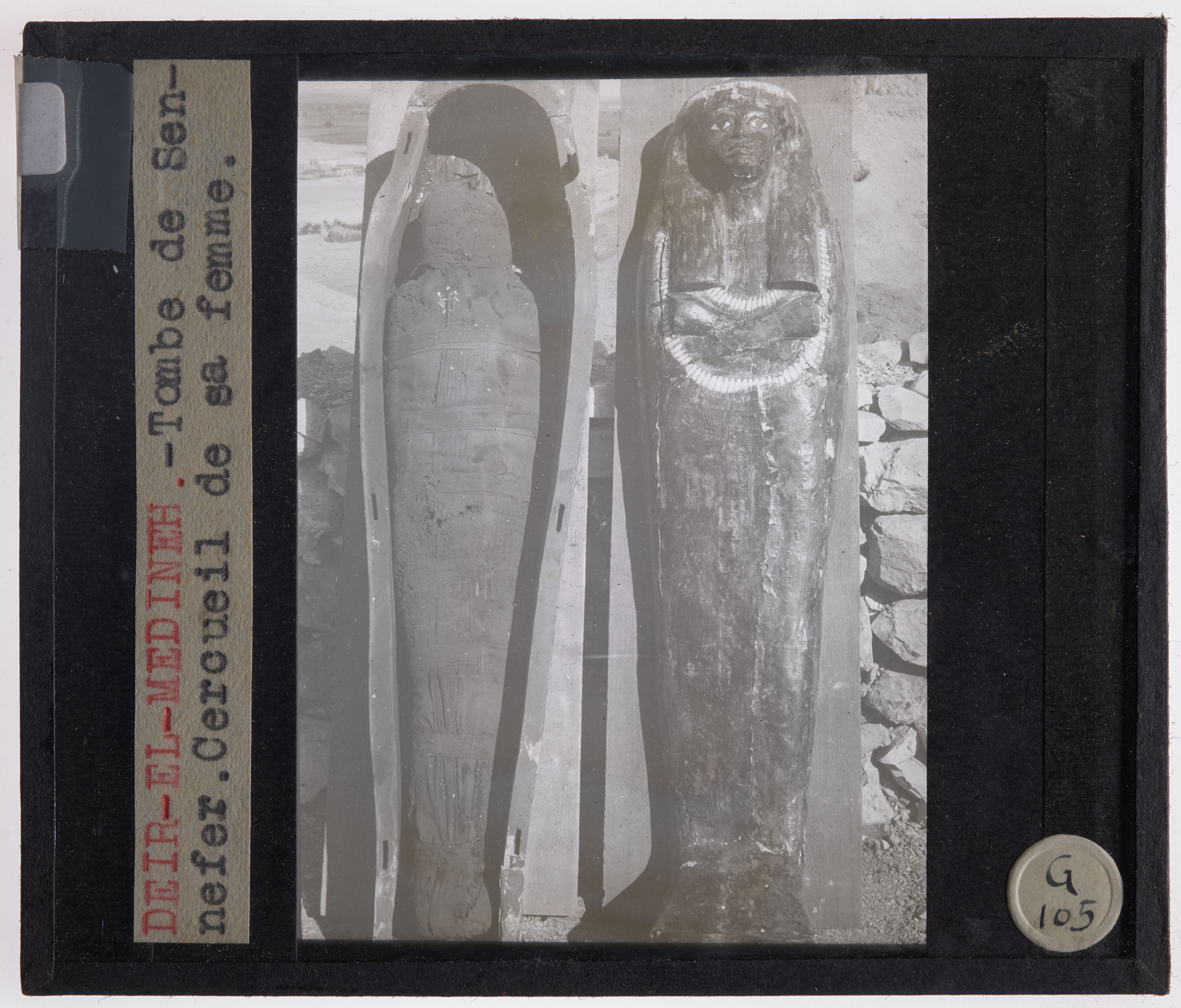
Coffined body of Nefertiti

Nefertiti was buried in a single coffin 1.92 m (6.3 ft) long made of sycomore wood. The mummiform coffin is very similar in style and decoration to Sennefer's, with the addition of hands and a headband painted across the front of the striped wig. The coffin's interior is also plain yellow.

On 6 March 1928, her coffin was opened and her mummy unwrapped. No objects were included in the coffin with her body and she was not equipped with a mask. Like Sennefer, she was wrapped in layers of linen, the outermost of which was a shroud secured by bands of fabric and stitched up the back. Her body showed no signs of mummification and was largely skeletonised, in similar condition to Sennefer. Large areas of mummified skin were present on her chest and abdomen.

Unlike Sennefer, her body wore several items of jewellery. A multi-stranded necklace composed of small beads of carnelian, turquoise, lapis lazuli, gold, and bone was found around her neck. On her left arm were two beaded bracelets, one on her upper arm and one on her wrist, and on the ring finger of her left hand were two rings. The larger of the two rings is silver and its bezel depicts a seated goddess with cow horns, possibly Hathor. The smaller ring is possibly electrum, a mix of gold and silver, and the bezel is incised with a design of a Hathor-cow in a papyrus swamp.

==== Infant ====
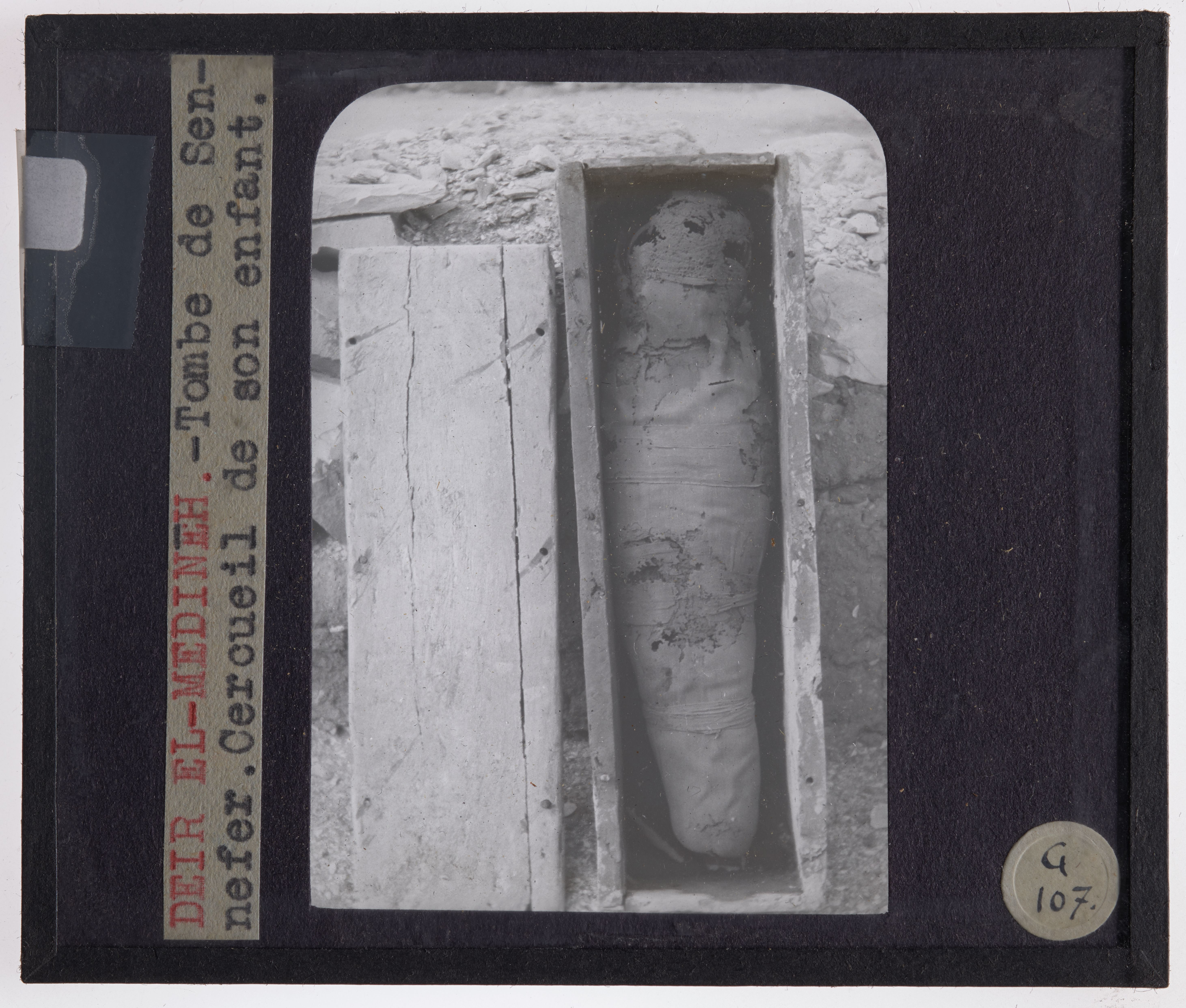
Wrapped body of the baby in their rectangular coffin

The infant was interred in a simple rectangular box-coffin 0.83 m (33 in) long, constructed from eight wooden boards. The exterior surface is painted white and is uninscribed. When discovered, the coffin was covered in a decayed linen shroud. The baby's mummy was 0.76 cm (0.30 in) tall. The mode of wrapping was similar to that of the adults, with an outer shroud secured by horizontal bands over several layers of bandages. The small body showed no signs of mummification and was skeletonised, with some preserved skin on the limbs and chest.

== Dispersal ==
The contents and human remains from the tomb are now divided between Egypt and several museums in Europe. The majority of the funerary goods and furniture, including Sennefer's coffin and items found on his mummy, are in the Louvre in Paris. The Egyptian Museum in Cairo retained the painted scene found atop his coffin and other small pieces such as the fan handle, an ushabti, and cubit rods. Nefertiti's coffin is in the National Museum of Warsaw. The skeletal remains of the occupants are held in Hrdlička’s Museum of Man in Prague, Czech Republic; an amphora and bowl are in the Náprstek Museum.

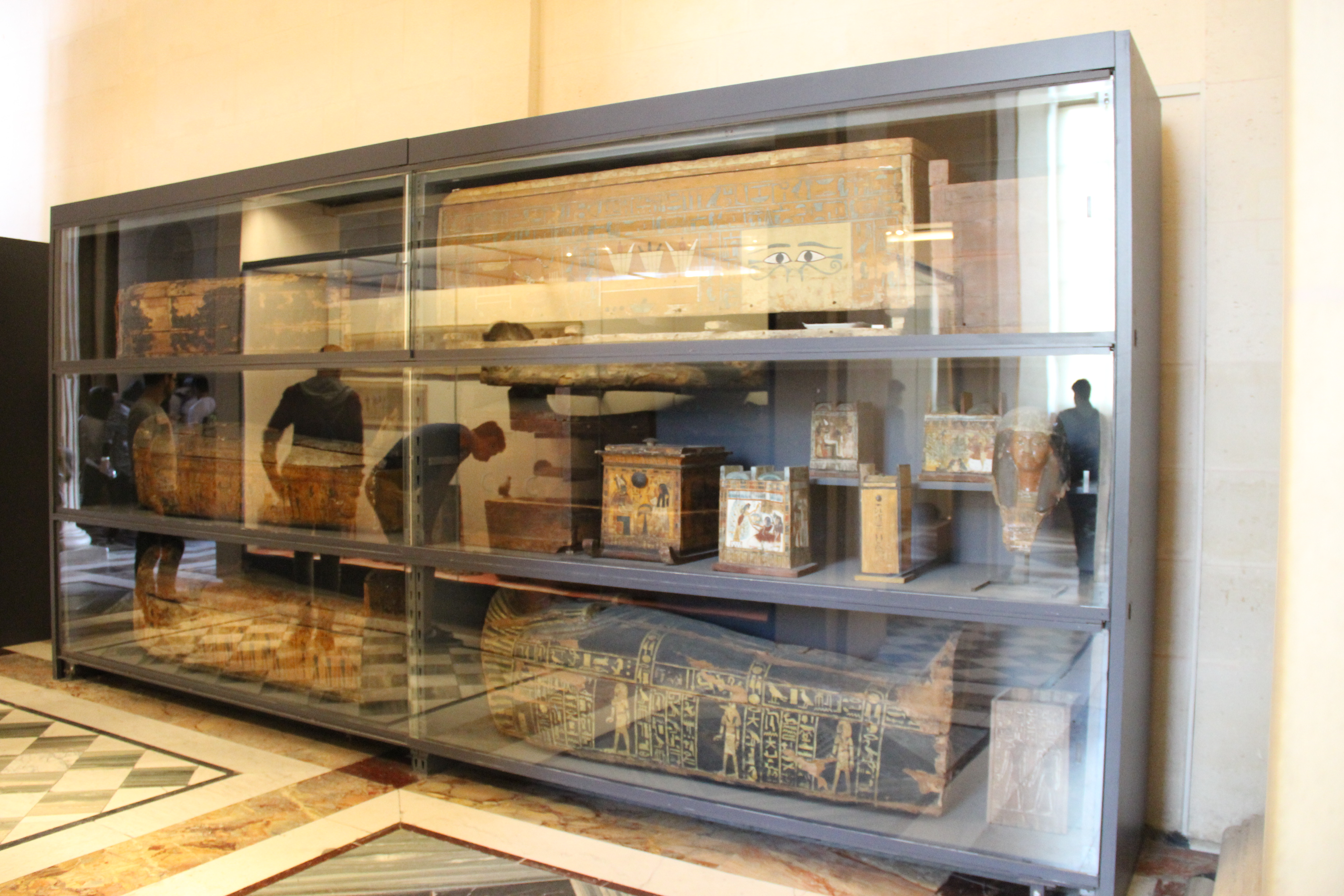
Coffin of Sennefer (bottom right) displayed in the Louvre in 2021

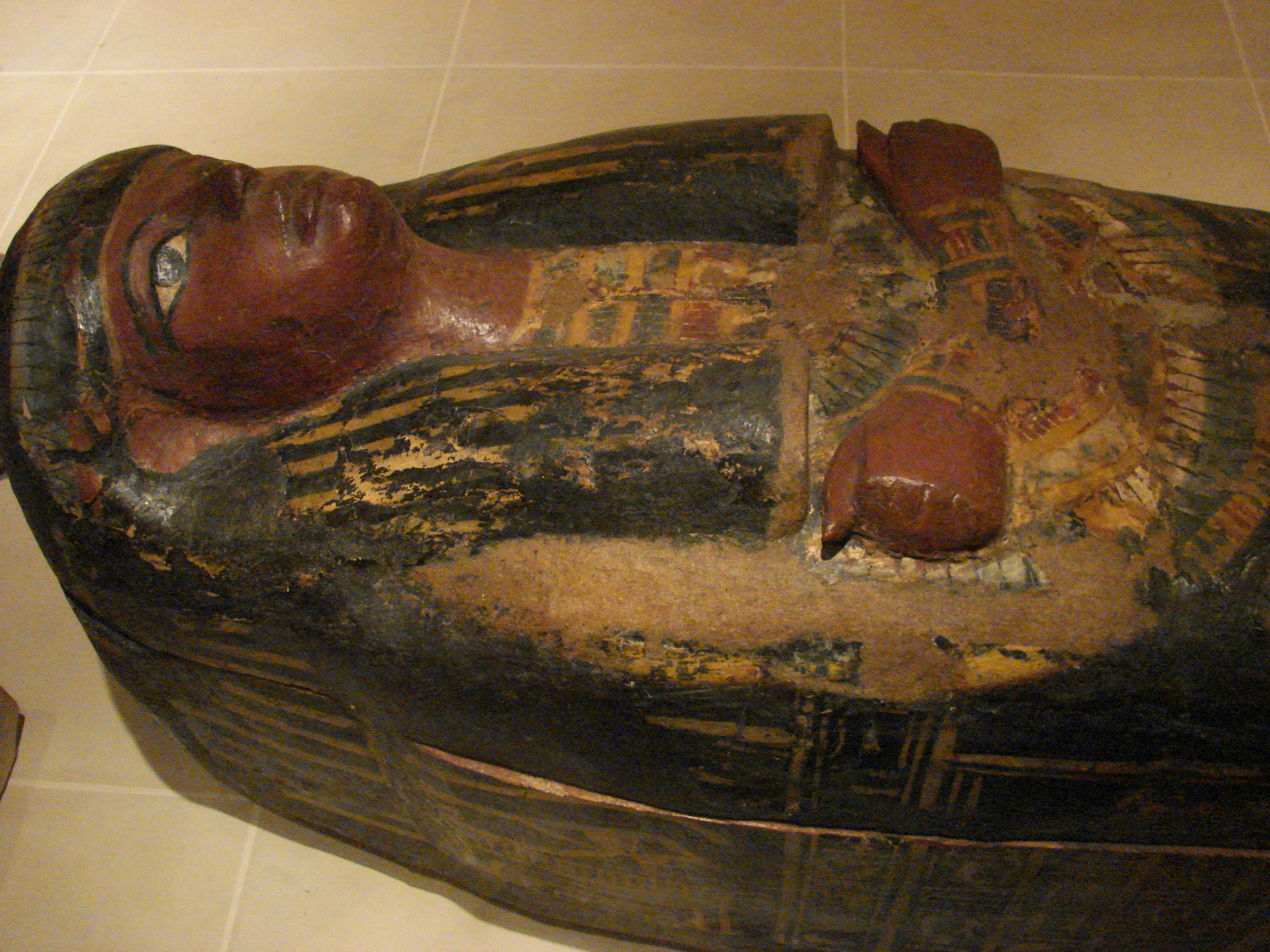
Coffin of Nefertiti displayed in the National Museum in Warsaw, Poland

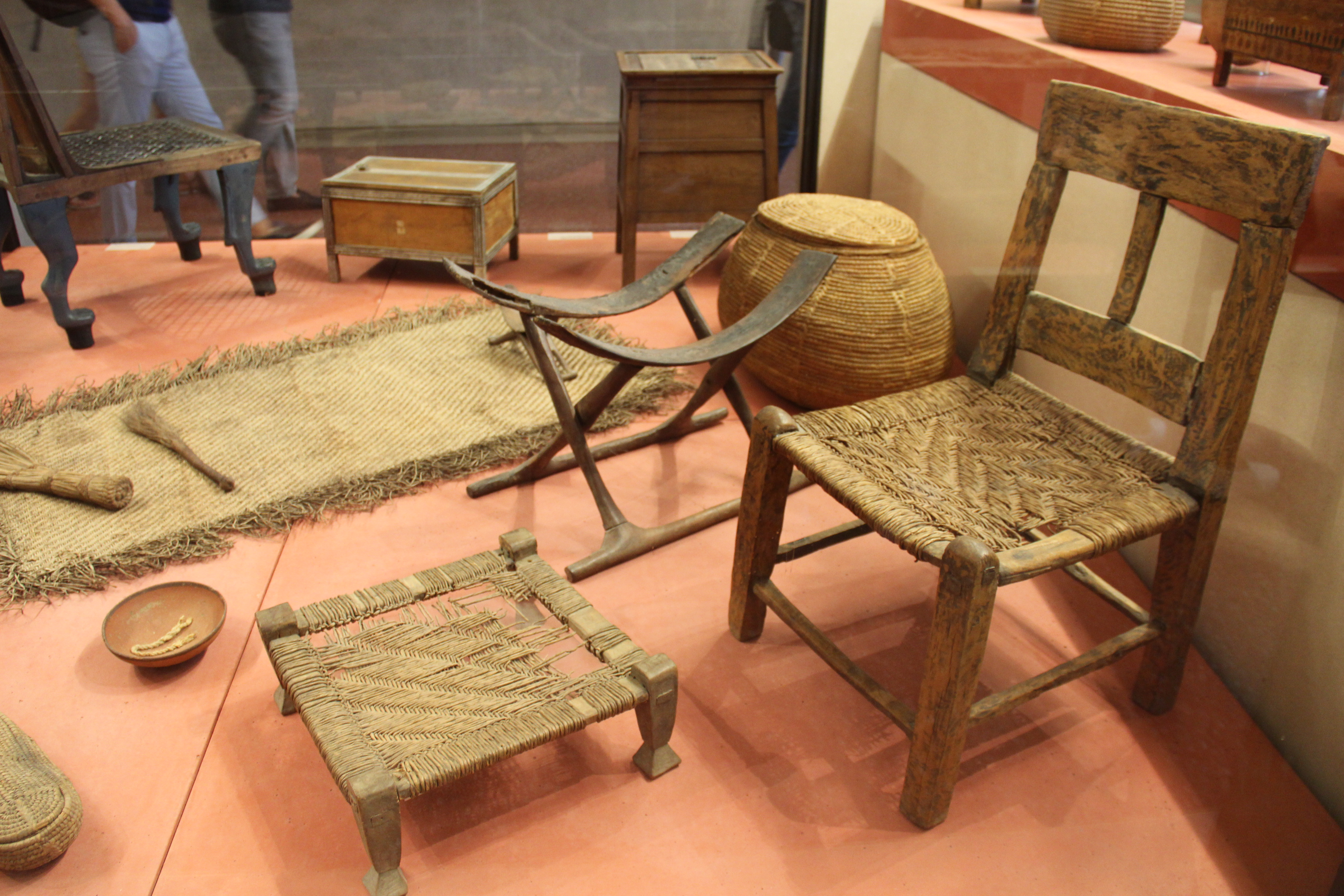
Folding stool of Sennefer (centre) displayed in the Louvre
