= TT5 =

Ancient Egyptian tomb

Coordinates: 25.7333°N 32.6000°E

Theban tomb TT5
- Burial site of Neferabet
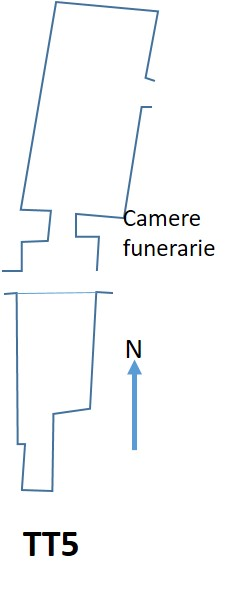

- Location within Egypt
- Location: Deir el-Medina, Theban Necropolis
- ← Previous; TT4 Next → TT6

F35 f r D59 t F51 M19
Neferabet
in hieroglyphs
Era: New Kingdom
(1550–1069 BC)

The Theban Tomb TT5 is located in Deir el-Medina, part of the Theban Necropolis, on the west bank of the Nile, opposite to Luxor. It is the burial place of the ancient Egyptian artisan (his exact title was Servant in the Place of Truth) named Neferabet, who lived during the Ramesside period.

Neferabet (also called Neferabu) was the son of Neferronpet and Mahi. His wife was named Taesi (Ta-Iset).

== Tomb ==
The tomb has two burial chambers. In chamber A a son named Nedjemger is shown offering a vase to Neferabet and Taesi. A large group of relatives is shown adoring the Hathor cow from the mountain. The relatives include: Neferabet himself, his "father" the scorpion curer Amenmose (father-in-law?), and his brother Amenemope. Also included are Neferabet's sons Neferronpet, Ramose, Nedjemger, Meriunu and Neferabets brothers Anhotep, Ipu, Huy, Merymaat and a man named Iryfdjodj. The women in the scene include Neferabet's wife Ta-ese, her mother Tenthaynu, his sister Istnofret and several daughters named Henuttu, Mahy, Tenthaynu, Hetepy, Mutemopet and Istnofret.

In another scene several family members are shown adoring Re-Harakhti. The relatives in this scene include Neferabet's father Neferronpet, Neferabet himself, Neferabet's brother Anhotep and several of Neferabet's uncles: Rahotep, Maaninakhtef, Ipu and Pashed.

In chamber B, five panels show the family adoring Anubis. Neferabet is accompanied by his wife, his sons Nedjemger, Neferronpet, Ramose, and Meriunu as well as his daughters Henutta, Tentha, Istnofret, Henut-iunet, Hetepy, Mutemopet, Mahy and Roruti. Anhotep is accompanied by their sisters Tentamenet and Ta(y)senofret.

1905-1914 photos during excavations. Archivio fotografico Museo Egizio, Turin.

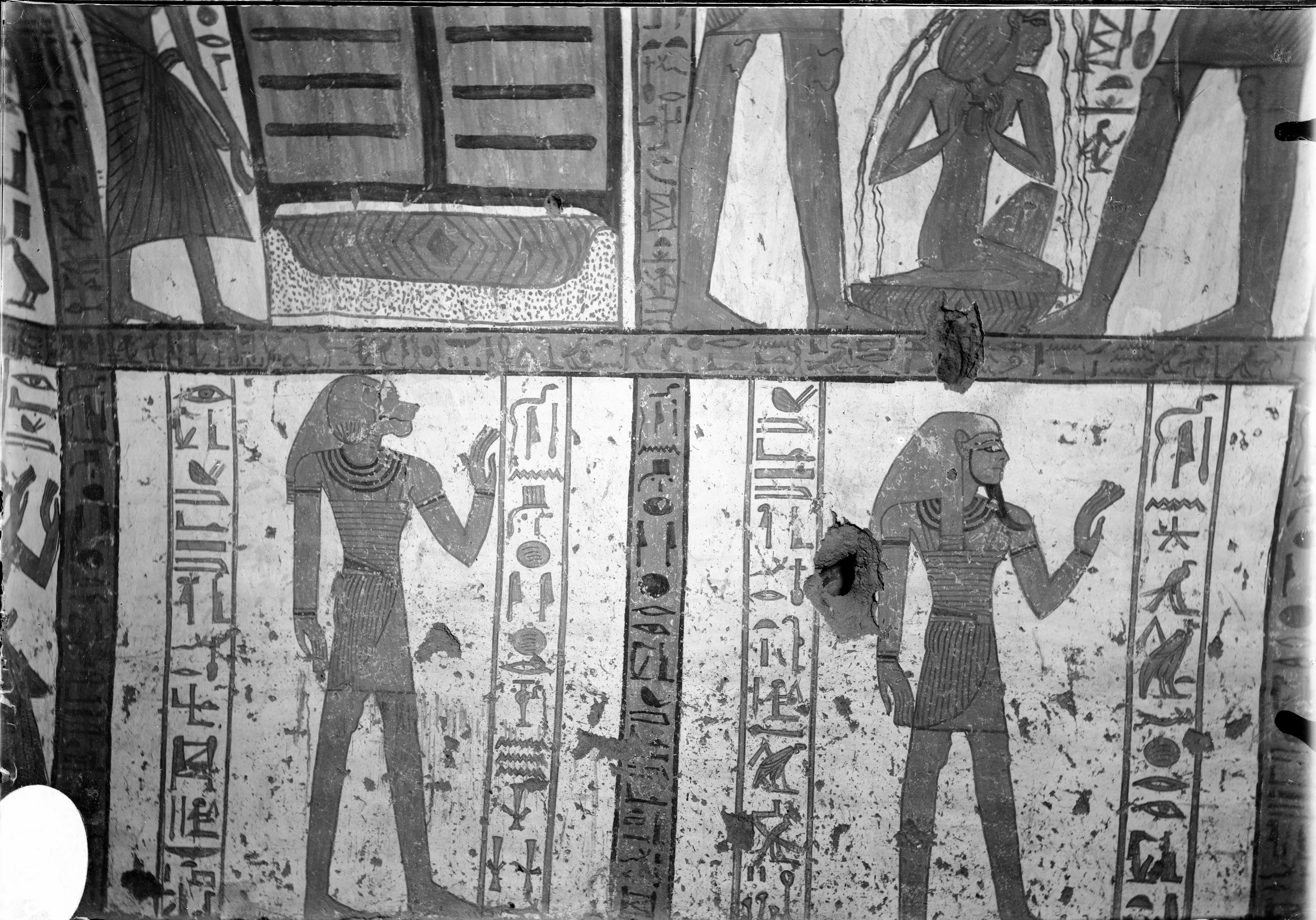
Detail of the west wall from the burial chamber of the tomb of Neferabet (TT 5). The funerary deity Qebekhsenuf is visible on the left and the funerary deity Duamutef, on the right.

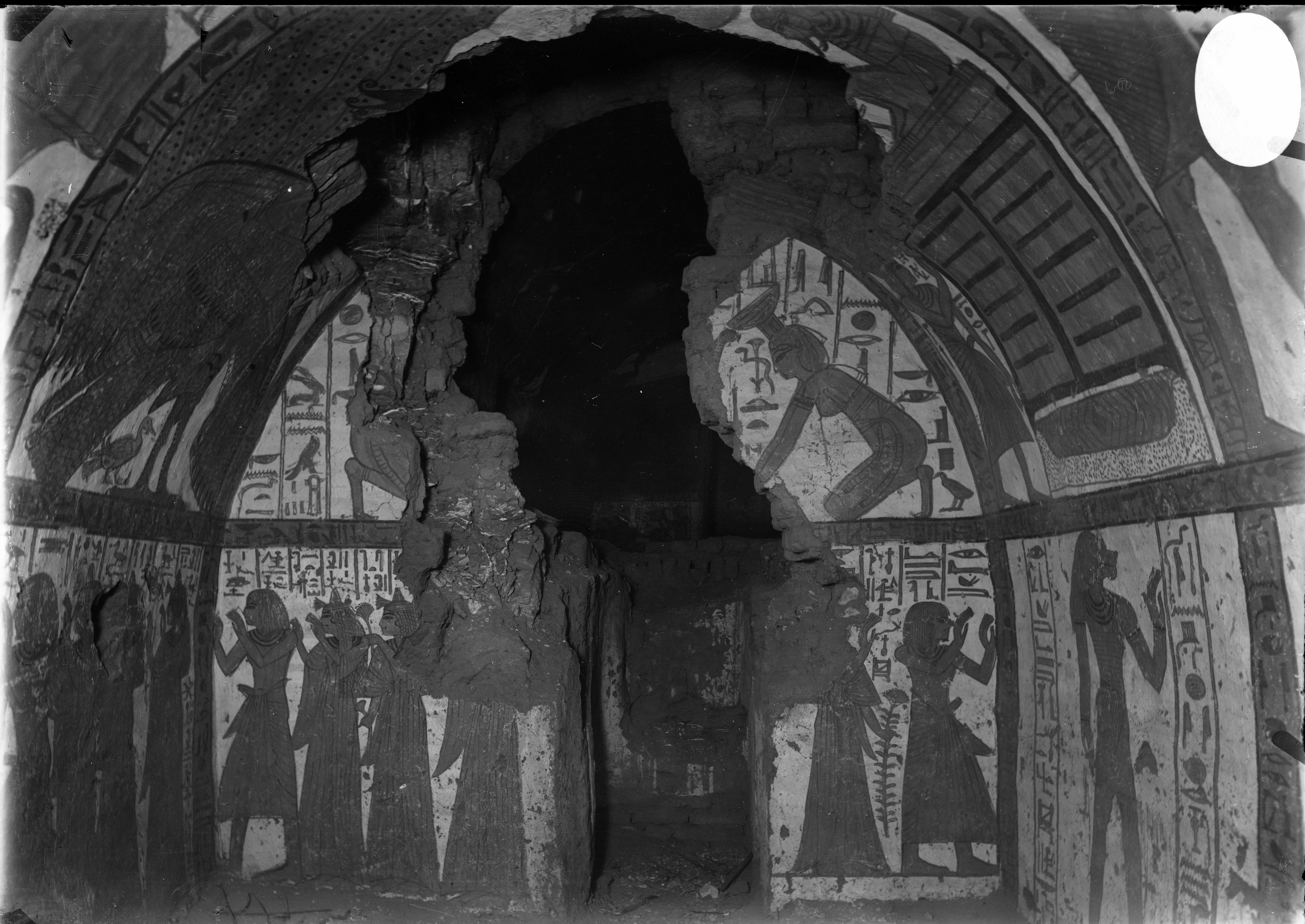
South wall from the burial chamber of the tomb. The wall is quite damaged. Identifiable in the upper register is the goddess Nephthys kneeling and on the other side is the goddess Isis, also kneeling. Only the feet of the goddess Isis remain. In the lower register there are adoration scenes.

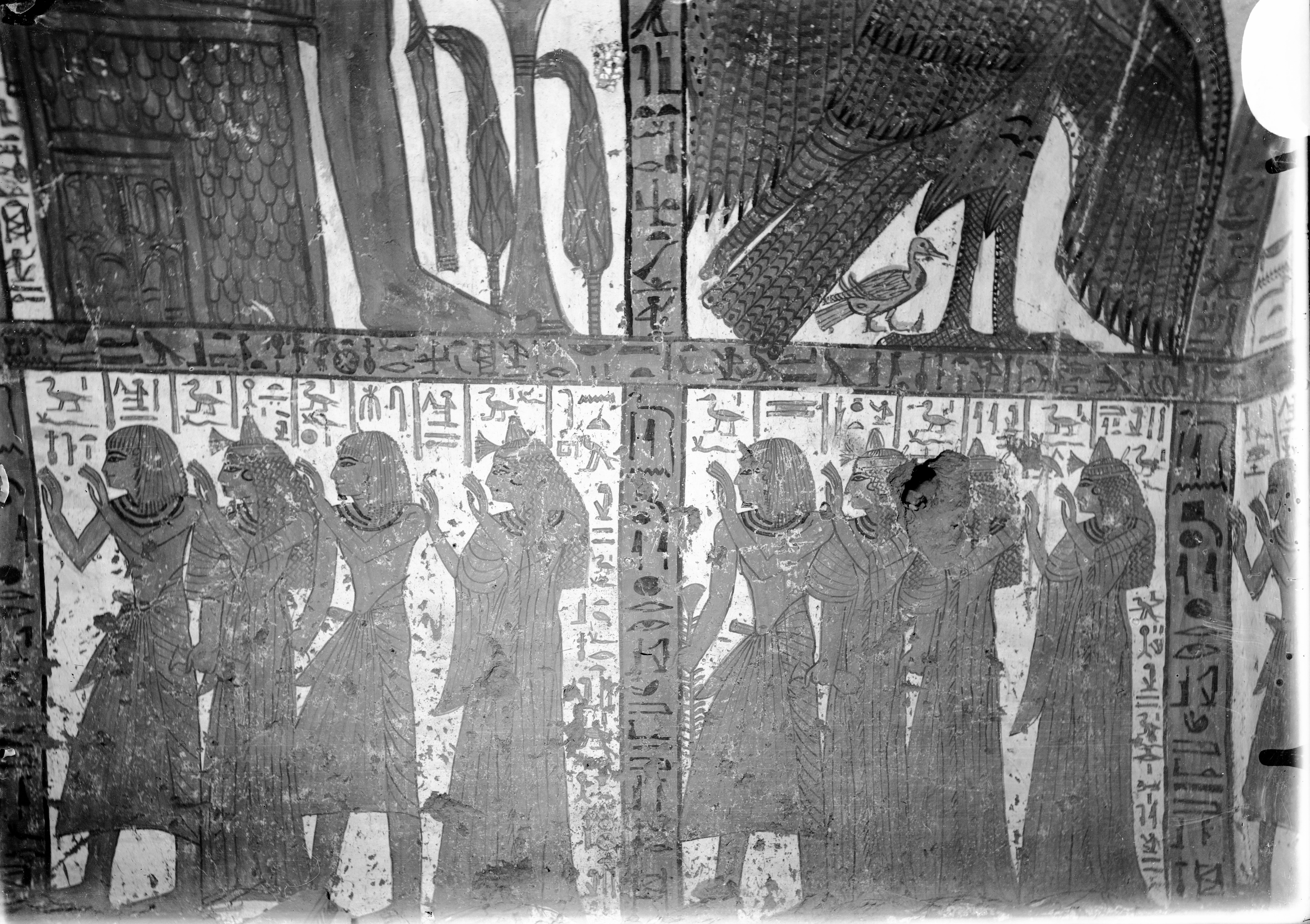
East wall from the burial chamber of the tomb. The deceased is represented with his family in the act of worshipping the god Anubis (not visible in this photograph).

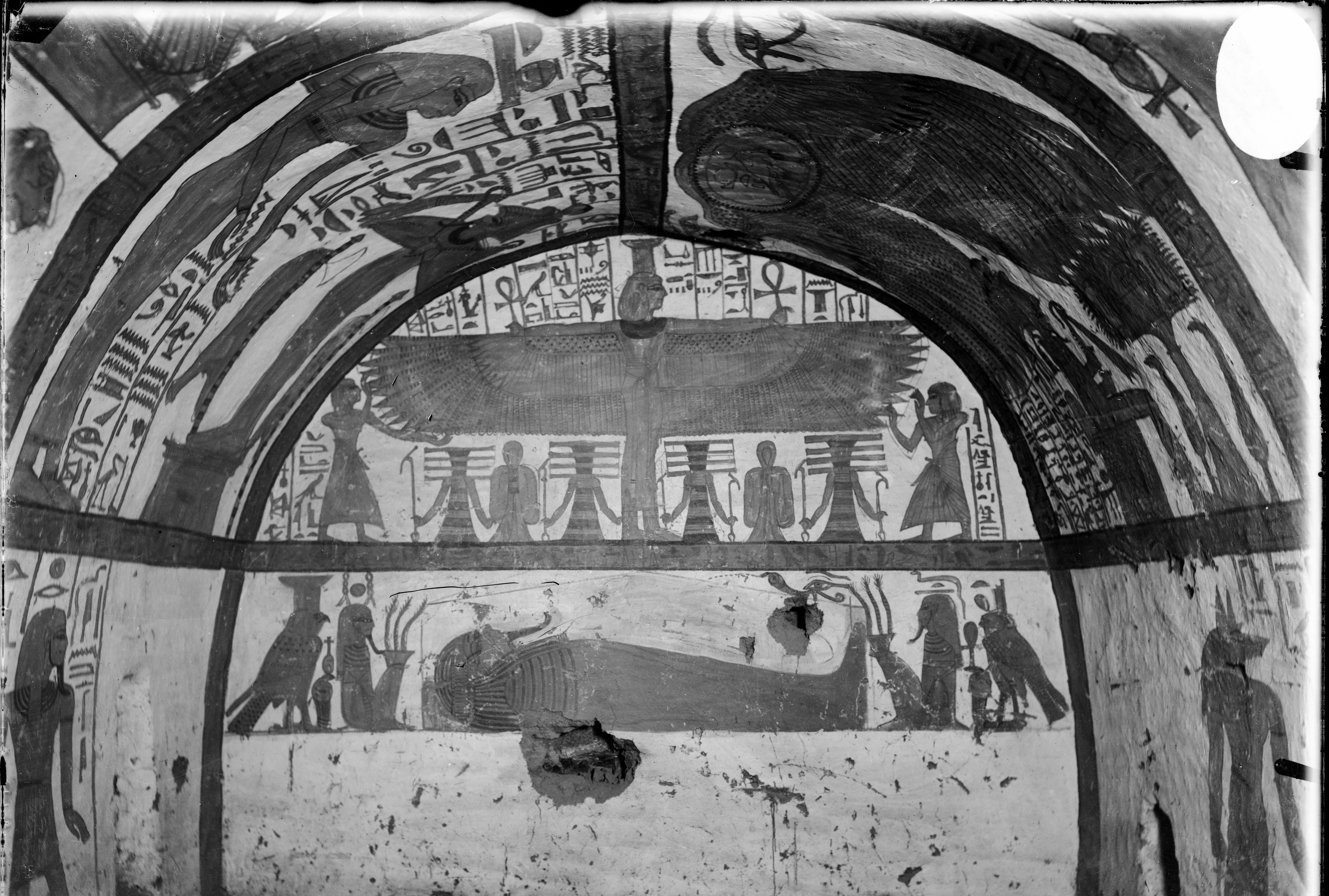
North wall (at the back) from the burial chamber. The upper register shows the winged goddess Nephthys, being worshipped by the deceased and his family. The lower register shows the mummy of the deceased, with the goddesses Nephthys (left) and the Isis (right) in the form of falcons on either side of Neferabet. Next to the goddesses are two divine figures (Khekekh and Djet).

== Finds ==
A stele mentioning Neferabet's father Neferrenpet is now in the British Museum (BM 150)

A statuette from Neferabu's tomb is now at the National Museum of Archaeology.

== See also ==
- List of Theban tombs
