= TT9 (tomb) =

Ancient Egyptian tomb

Coordinates: 25.7333°N 32.6000°E

Theban tomb TT9
- Burial site of Amenmose
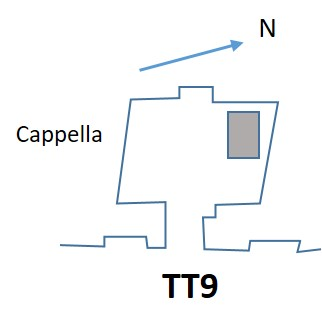

- Location within Egypt
- Location: Deir el-Medina, Theban Necropolis
- Discovered: 20th Dynasty, reign of Ramesses III
- ← Previous; TT8 Next → TT10

i mn n ms s
Amenmose
in hieroglyphs
Era: New Kingdom
(1550–1069 BC)

The Theban Tomb TT9 is located in Deir el-Medina, part of the Theban Necropolis, on the west bank of the Nile, opposite to Luxor. It is the burial place of an ancient Egyptian artisan (his exact title was Servant in the Place of Truth) named Amenmose, who lived during the 20th Dynasty, during the reign of Ramesses III.

Amenmose was a Servant in the Place of Truth and a Charmer of Scorpions. His wife was named Tent-hom.

== See also ==
- List of Theban tombs
