= Pashedu =

Ancient Egyptian artisan

- Servant in the Place of Truth
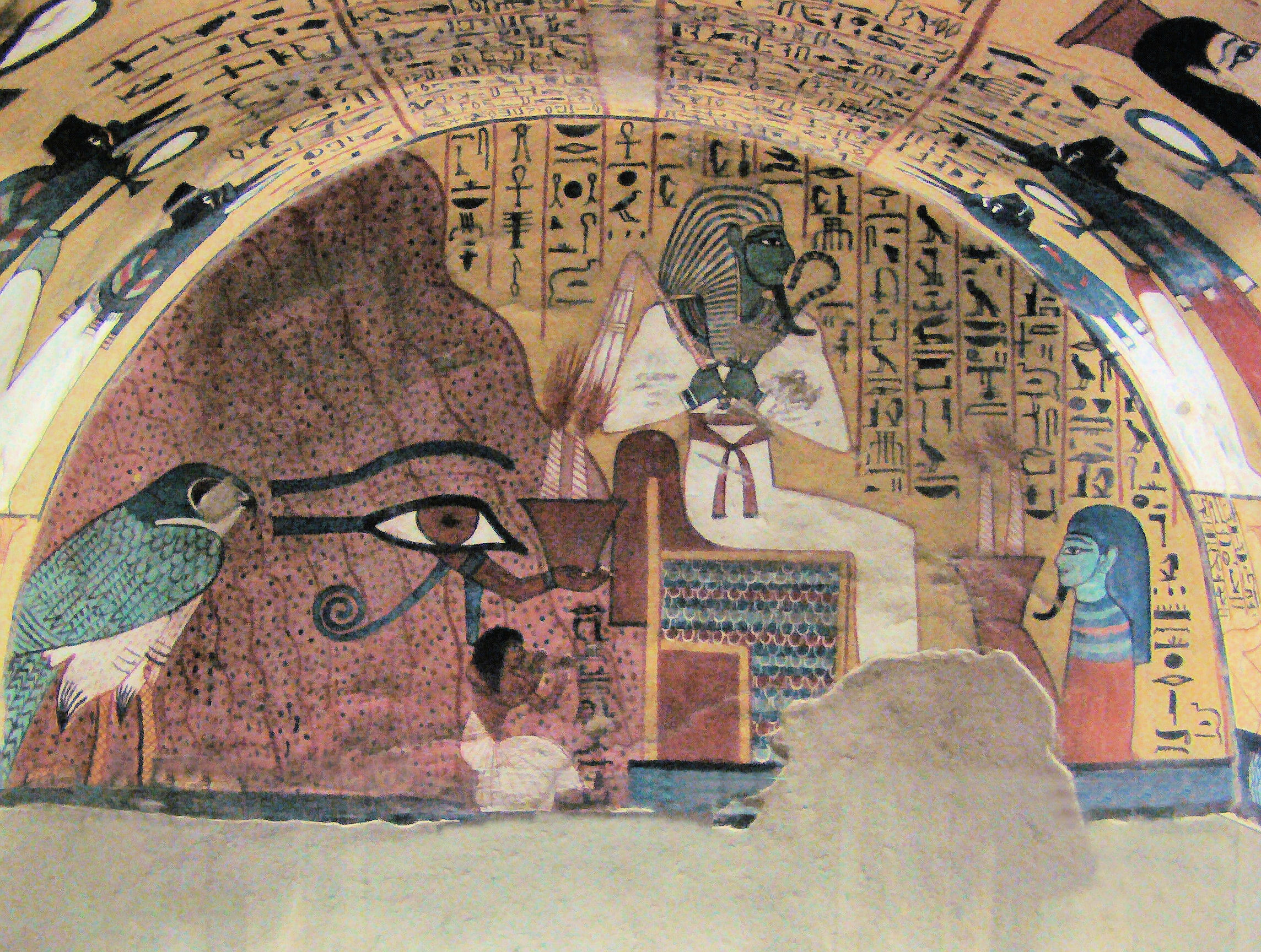
- Pashedu's tomb TT3
Egyptian name
G40 A F30 d V1 D40
- Dynasty: 19th Dynasty
- Pharaoh: Seti I & Ramesses II
- Children: Menna, Qaha, Nebenmaat?

Pashedu was an ancient Egyptian artisan. Pashedu lived in Deir el-Medina on the west bank of the Nile, opposite Thebes, during the reign of Seti I and possibly Ramesses II. Pashedu was a son of Menna and Huy. His wife was named Nedjmet-behdet. Pashedu was the owner of tomb TT3 and likely TT326. His titles included Servant in the Place of Truth, meaning that he worked on the excavation and decoration of the nearby royal tombs. Pashedu seems to have succeeded Baki as foreman for the left side during the reign of Ramesses II.

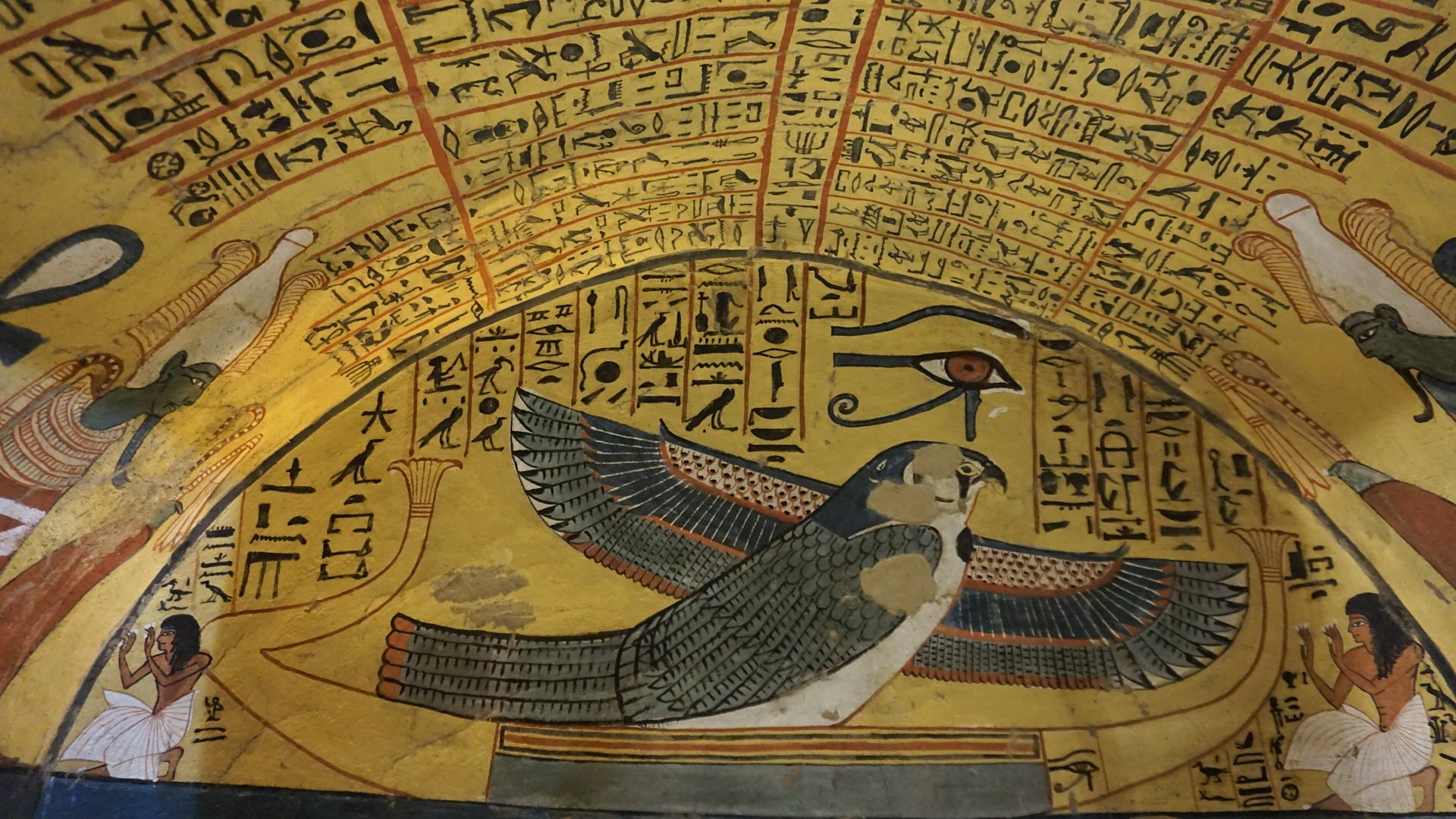
An opposite view of Pashedu's TT3 tomb.

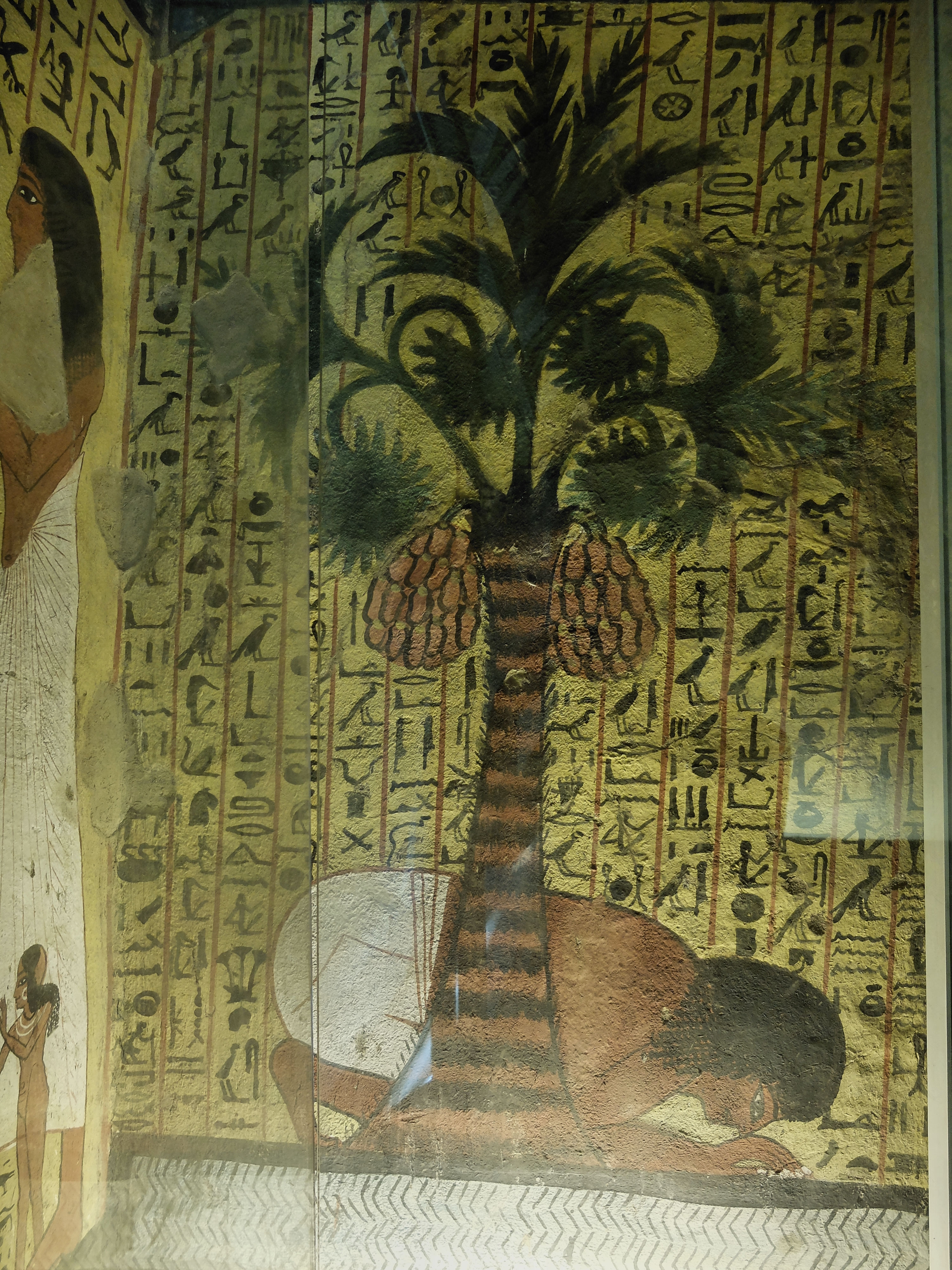
Painting of Pashedu kneeling down to drink from a canal next to a palm tree in his TT3 Tomb.

A son named Menna is mentioned in TT3. He was named after his paternal grandfather. Another son named Qaha is mentioned in the tomb as well. It is possible a third man named Nebenmaat (attested in TT219) is a son of Pashedu as well.

Pashedu's tomb is one of the most beautifully preserved tombs with well preserved reliefs and painted scenes during the New Kingdom.
