= TT250 =

Ancient Egyptian tomb near Luxor

Theban tomb TT250
- Burial site of Ramose
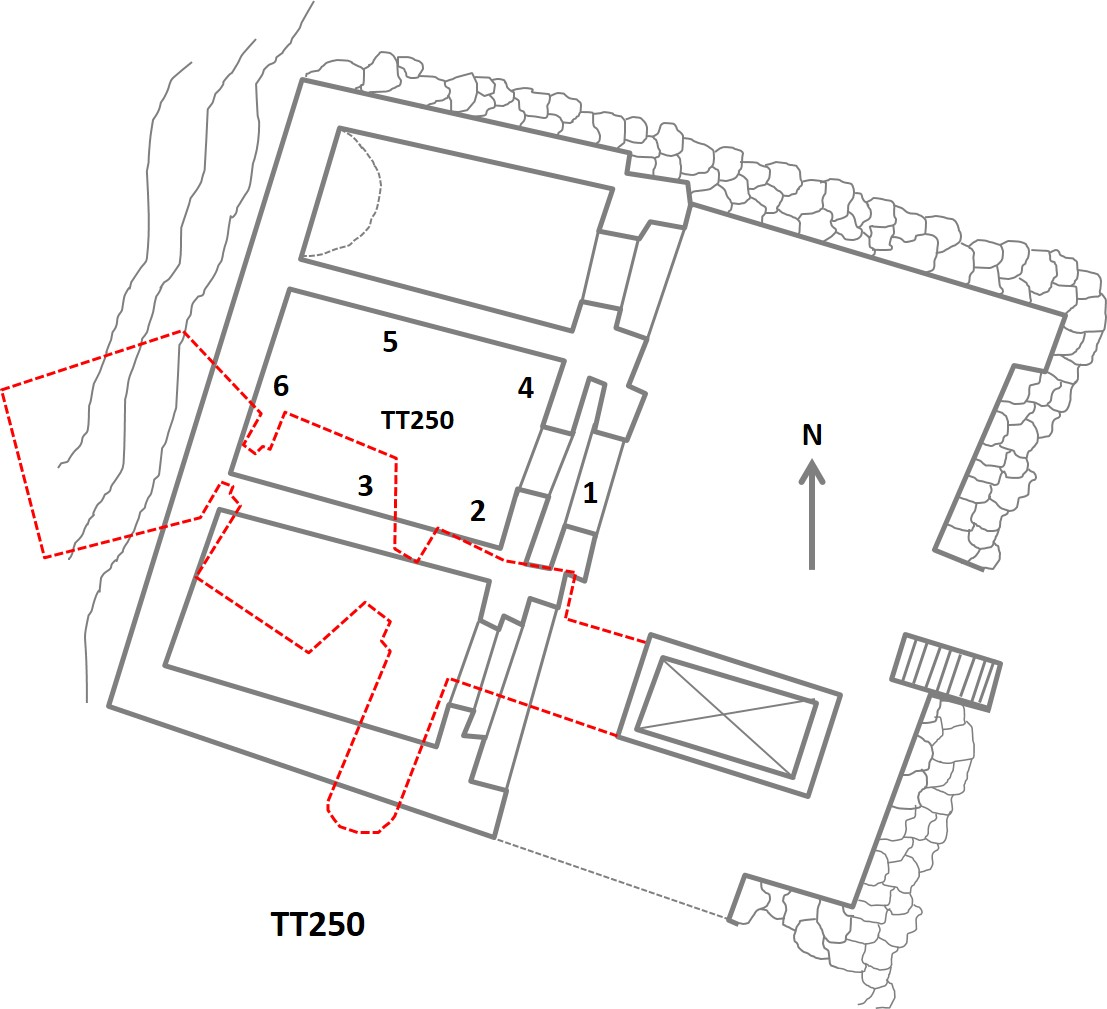
- Schematic plan of TT250 (Note: The numbering of the rooms and walls follows Porter and Moss 1927, p. 336.)

- Coordinates: 25.7333°N 32.6000°E
- Location: Deir el-Medina, Theban Necropolis, Theban Necropolis
- Decoration: Monochrome chapel decoration
- Layout: Three chapels, courtyard, shaft and underground burial apartment
- ← Previous; TT249 Next → TT251

r a N5 Z1 ms s
Ramose
in hieroglyphs
Era: New Kingdom
(1550–1069 BC)

Theban Tomb 250 (TT250) is an ancient Egyptian tomb attributed to the scribe Ramose in the necropolis of Deir el-Medina, one of the areas of the Tombs of the Nobles in the Theban Necropolis, on the west bank of the Nile opposite Luxor, Egypt. The tomb dates to the Nineteenth Dynasty, during the reign of Ramesses II. It was formerly attributed to Neferhotep and to Amenmes. Its traditional name, the "tomb of the female servants", comes from the female mummies shown in its decoration; the most recent interpretation sees TT250 as a tomb for the women around Ramose or his wife Mutemwia.

Ramose was one of the most important figures known from Deir el-Medina; more than one hundred monuments mention him or were dedicated to him. Two other tombs in the same necropolis are attributed to him, TT7 and TT212; TT7 is interpreted as his personal tomb, while TT212 remained at an early stage of work. The Theban Necropolis was used for burials of nobles and officials connected with the royal houses, especially in the New Kingdom, but it was also used as a cemetery from the Old Kingdom to the Saite and Ptolemaic periods.

== Tomb owner ==
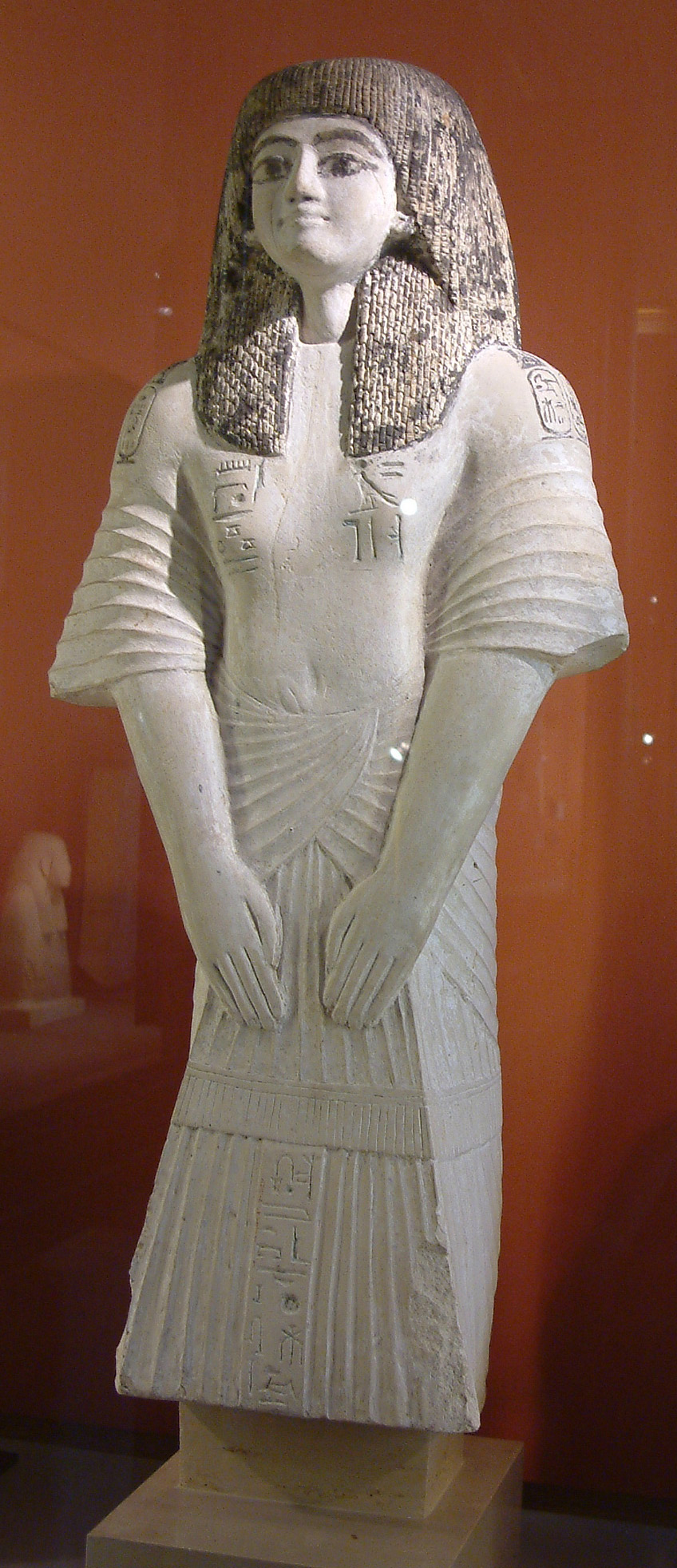
Statue of Ramose, painted limestone, reign of Ramesses II, found in 1939 in the khenu of Ramesses II at Deir el-Medina, room 9, shaft 1414; Paris, Louvre, E 16346.

TT250 was the tomb of Ramose, Scribe in the Place of Truth at Deir el-Medina under Ramesses II. The "Place of Truth" was Set-Maat, one of the names of the village of Deir el-Medina; the village was also known as Pa-demi, "the village". Gardiner and Weigall placed TT250 not far from the top of the hill, a little north of TT1, TT218 and TT220.

Ramose, the owner of TT250, is identifiable with the owner of TT7 and TT212. Besides the office of scribe attested in TT7, Ramose is known as one of the most important figures at Deir el-Medina, and more than one hundred monuments mention him or were dedicated to him. Traces and references to Ramose also appear in other tombs of the area. (Note: Traces of Ramose are recorded in several tombs: in TT336, the tomb of the sculptor Neferrenpet, Ramose and his wife Mutemwia, sometimes shortened to Wia, bring offerings to the royal scribe Huy, brother of Neferrenpet and father of Mutemwia; in TT219, the tomb of Nebenmaat, Servant in the Place of Truth, although the text copied by Bruyère in 1952 is now lost; in TT4, the tomb of the sculptor Ken, where the vizier Paser and the royal scribe Ramose offer libations to Maat; and in TT10, the tomb of Penbui and Kasa, servants in the Place of Truth, where Paser and Ramose, before Ramesses II, offer libations to Ptah and Hathor.) Wannan describes Ramose as the wealthiest person known to have lived at Deir el-Medina up to his time.

Ramose was the son of Amenemhab, a secretary and court bailiff, and of Kakaia. He married Mutemwia, daughter of Huy and Neferetkau, and adopted Kenherkhepeshef. (Note: An offering table in the Louvre in Paris, E 13998, bears the names of Ramose and Khenirkhopshef; it is thought to come from TT7 and has been used as evidence for the adoption.) His first known office was that of scribe in the house of Men-kheperu-Ra, the mortuary temple of Thutmose IV.

The titles attributed to Ramose include chief treasurer in the house of Men-kheperu-Ra, director of administration in the department of the director of sealed records, accountant-scribe of the cattle of Amun-Re, assistant scribe for the correspondence of the crown prince, servant in the domains of Amun-Re and administrator of funerary domains in the fields of Amun-Re. An ostracon in the Egyptian Museum in Cairo, CG 25671, records the appointment of Ramose as Scribe in the Place of Truth in year 5 of Ramesses II, third month of Akhet, day 10. A painted limestone statue in the Louvre, E 16346, identifies Ramose as Scribe in the Place of Truth and hem-servant of the domain of Amun-Re; the inscriptions on the statue also include the names of Ramesses II, Thutmose IV and Horemheb.

== Excavation and documentation ==
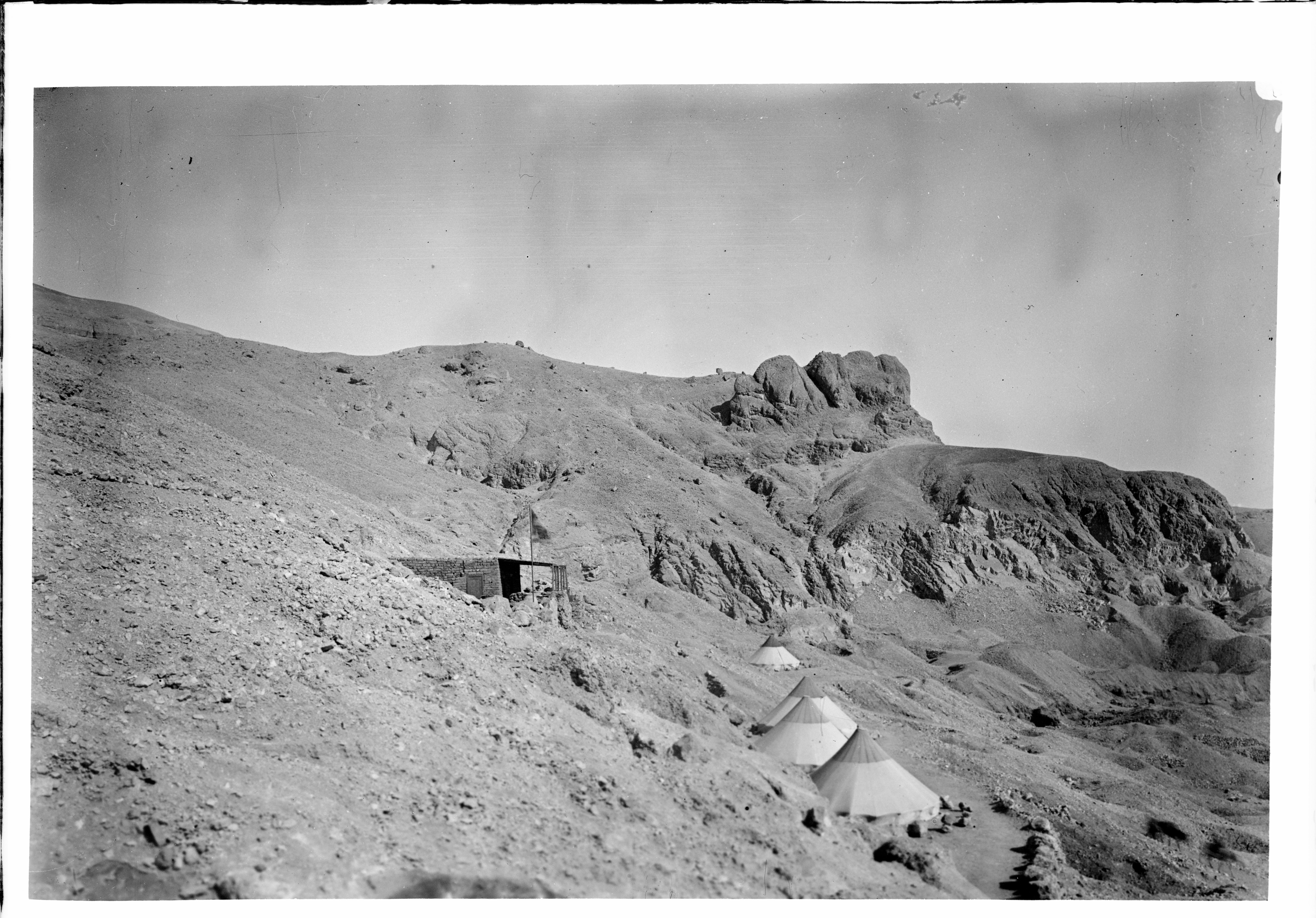
Camp of the Italian Archaeological Mission at Deir el-Medina in 1909. Museo Egizio Photo Archive, Turin.

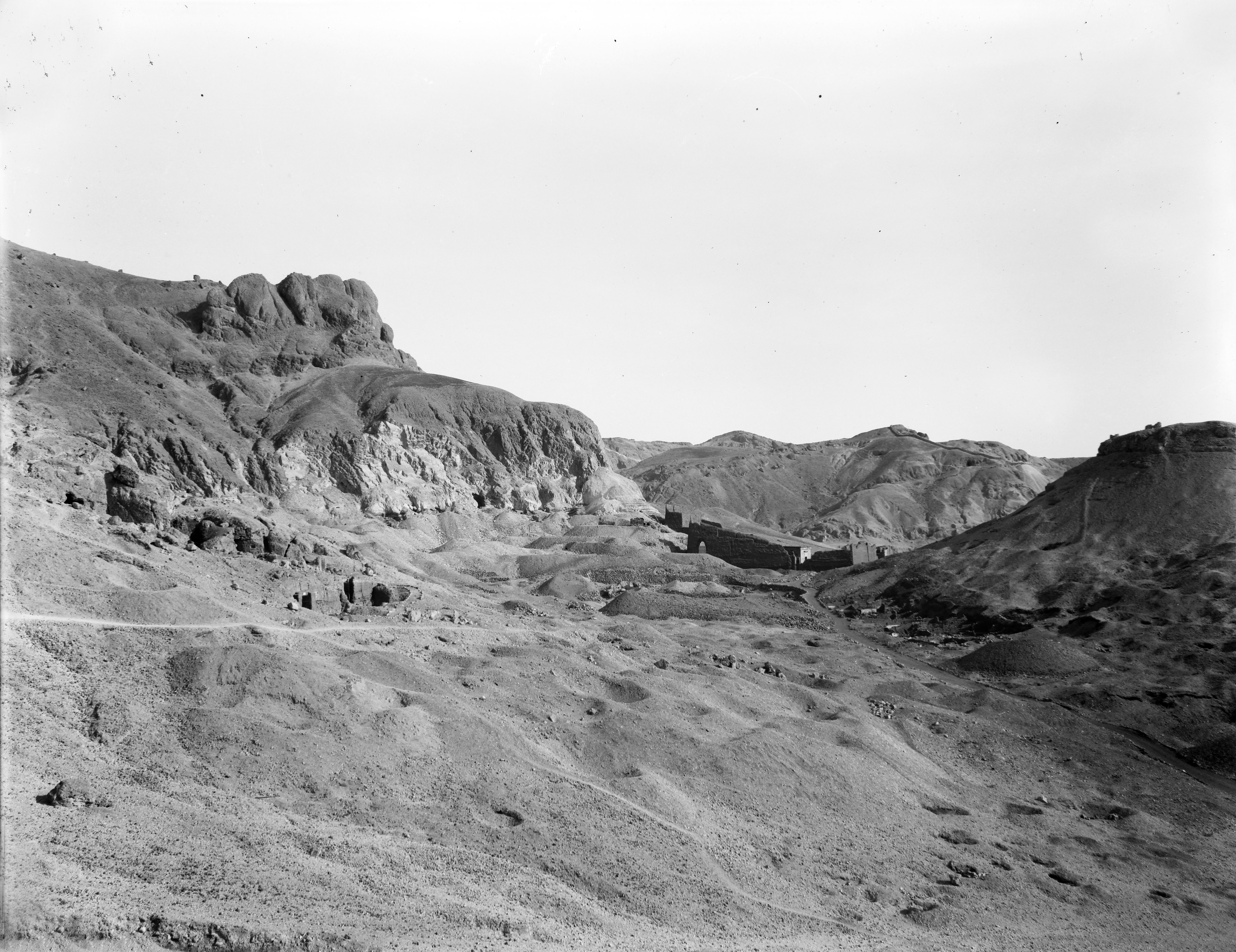
View of the valley floor at Deir el-Medina during Schiaparelli's excavations, 1906-1909. Museo Egizio Photo Archive, Turin, E00263.

TT250 is documented in Bernard Bruyère's report on the 1926 campaign at Deir el-Medina, published in 1927 on pages 59-74 and plates V-VIII. The photographic database of the Institut français d'archéologie orientale records three exterior views of the tomb, dated 1927, 1969 and about 1970, and a publication in preparation by Cédric Gobeil. In 2018, work was carried out on the archaeology, decoration, inscriptions and historical setting of TT250 in preparation for publication of the tomb.

Between 1905 and 1909, Ernesto Schiaparelli and the Italian Archaeological Mission excavated the site of Deir el-Medina. Their work covered the village, a votive area and the necropolis, including non-royal tombs of particular importance. The campaigns of the Italian Archaeological Mission are also recorded in photographs preserved in the Museo Egizio Photo Archive.

Several objects from Deir el-Medina connected with Ramose are held in Turin. A limestone fragment from the base of a statue bearing the name of the scribe Ramose was acquired during Schiaparelli's excavation in 1909. The Museo Egizio also preserves a stela dedicated by the royal scribe Ramose to the goddess Qetesh, represented between Min and Reshep, and fragments of a stela inscribed with the name of the scribe Ramose. A limestone pyramidion of Ramose, also in the Museo Egizio, has been connected with the brick pyramid that stood above the chapel of one of the three tombs attributed to Ramose.

Objects from Deir el-Medina inscribed for Ramose in the Museo Egizio, Turin

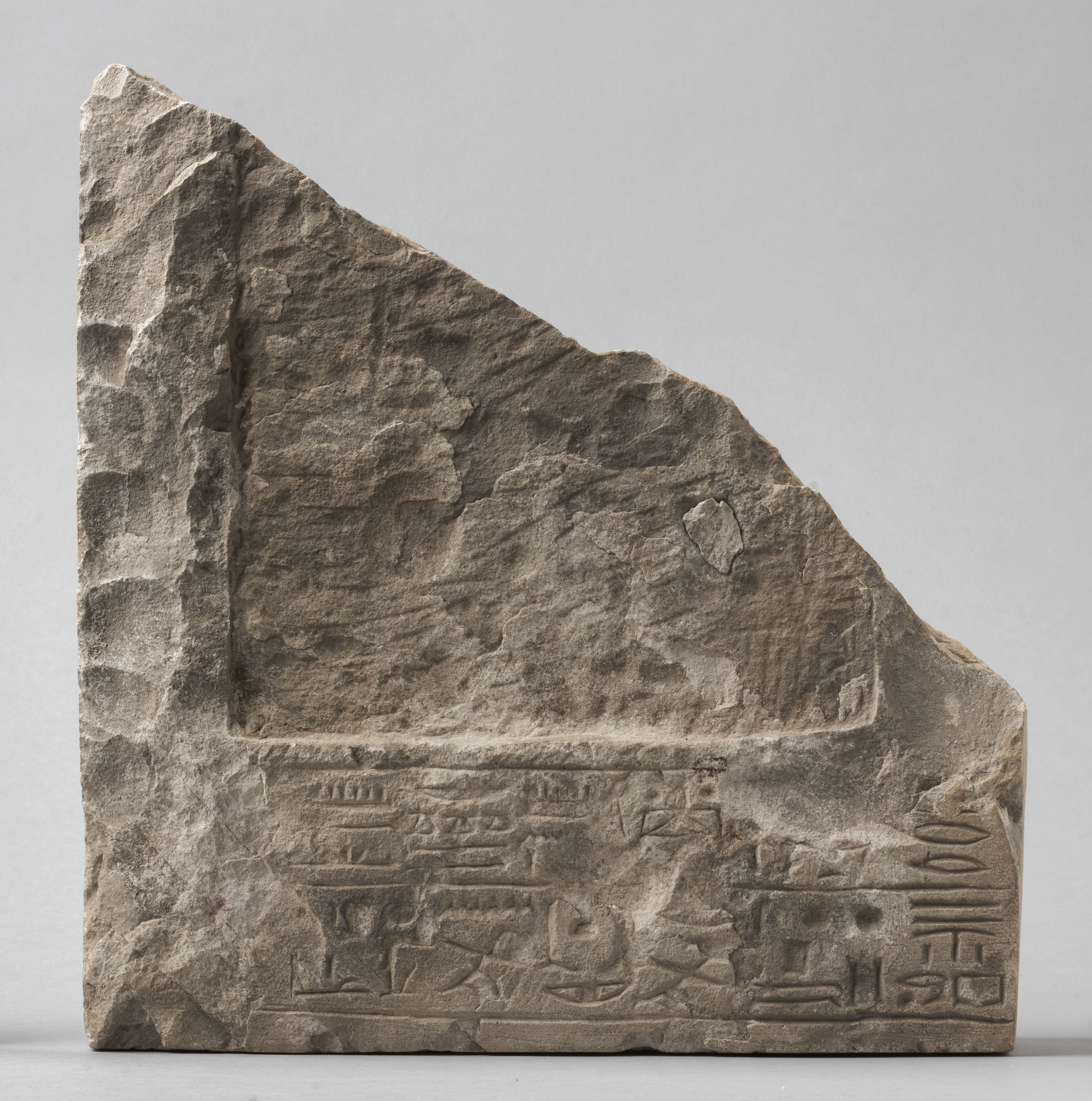
Fragment of a statue base with the name of the scribe Ramose, Suppl. 9493.

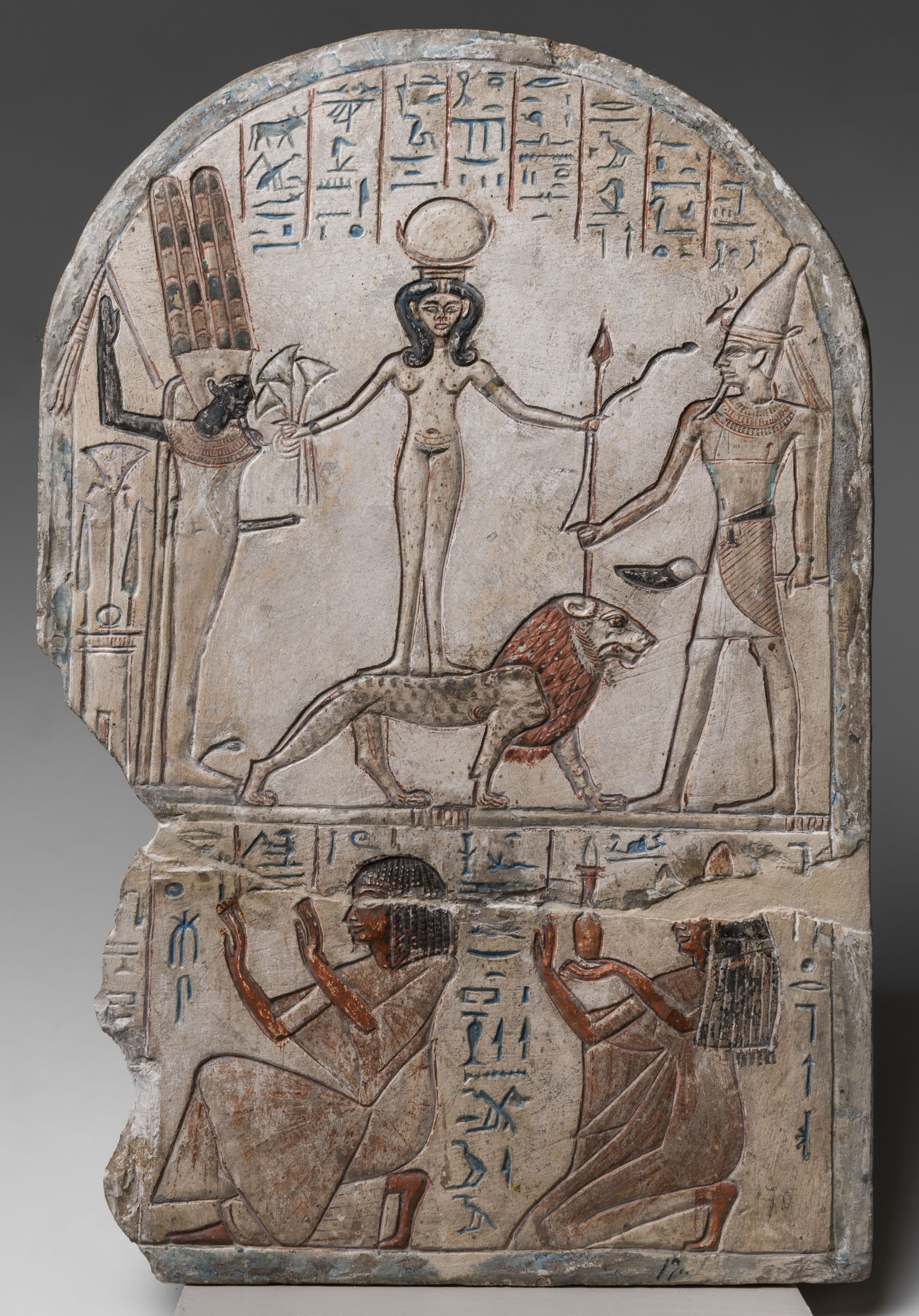
Limestone stela dedicated by the royal scribe Ramose to Qetesh, shown between Min and Reshep, Cat. 1601.

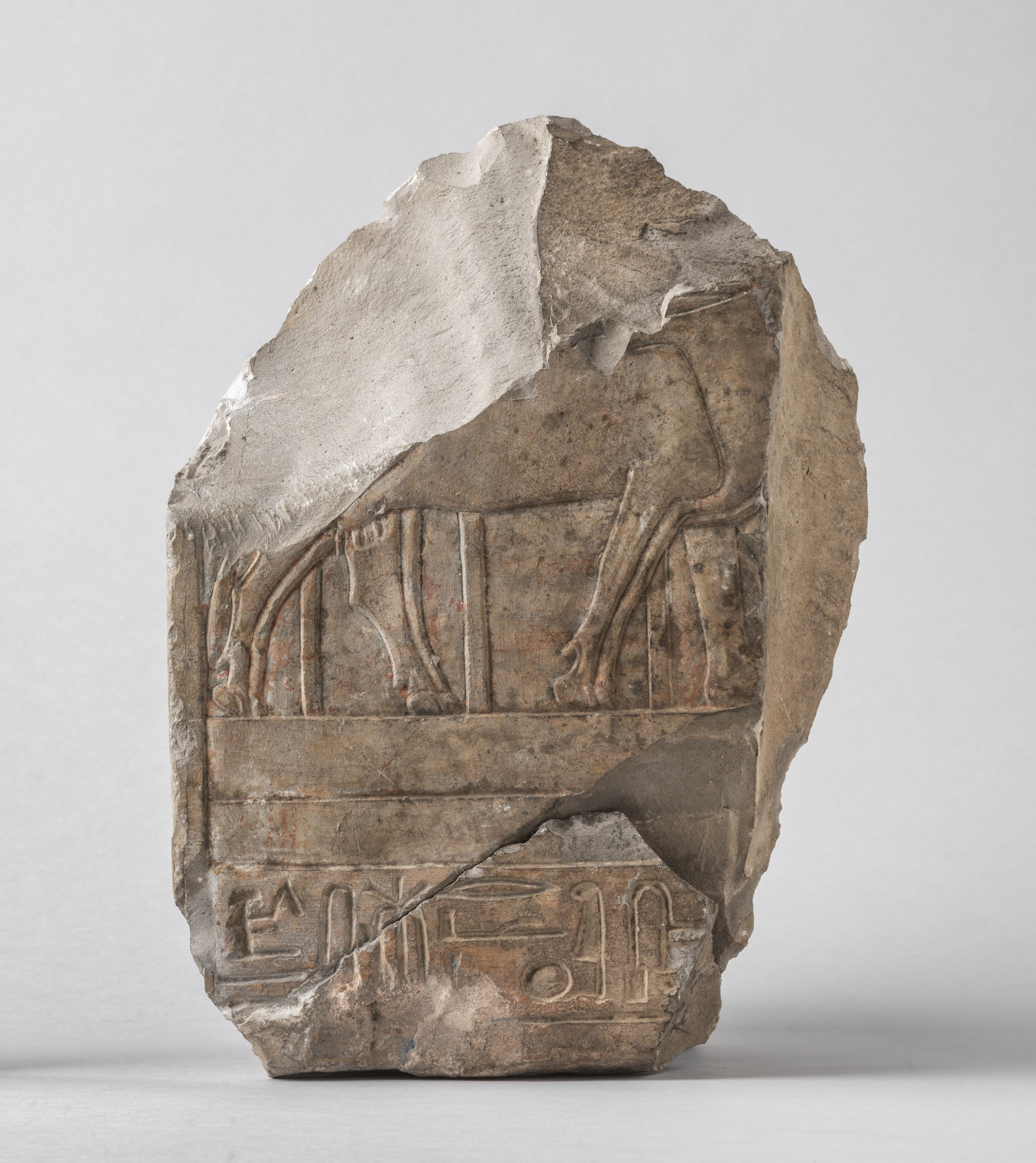
Stela fragments with the name of the scribe Ramose, Suppl. 6011 and Suppl. 06027.

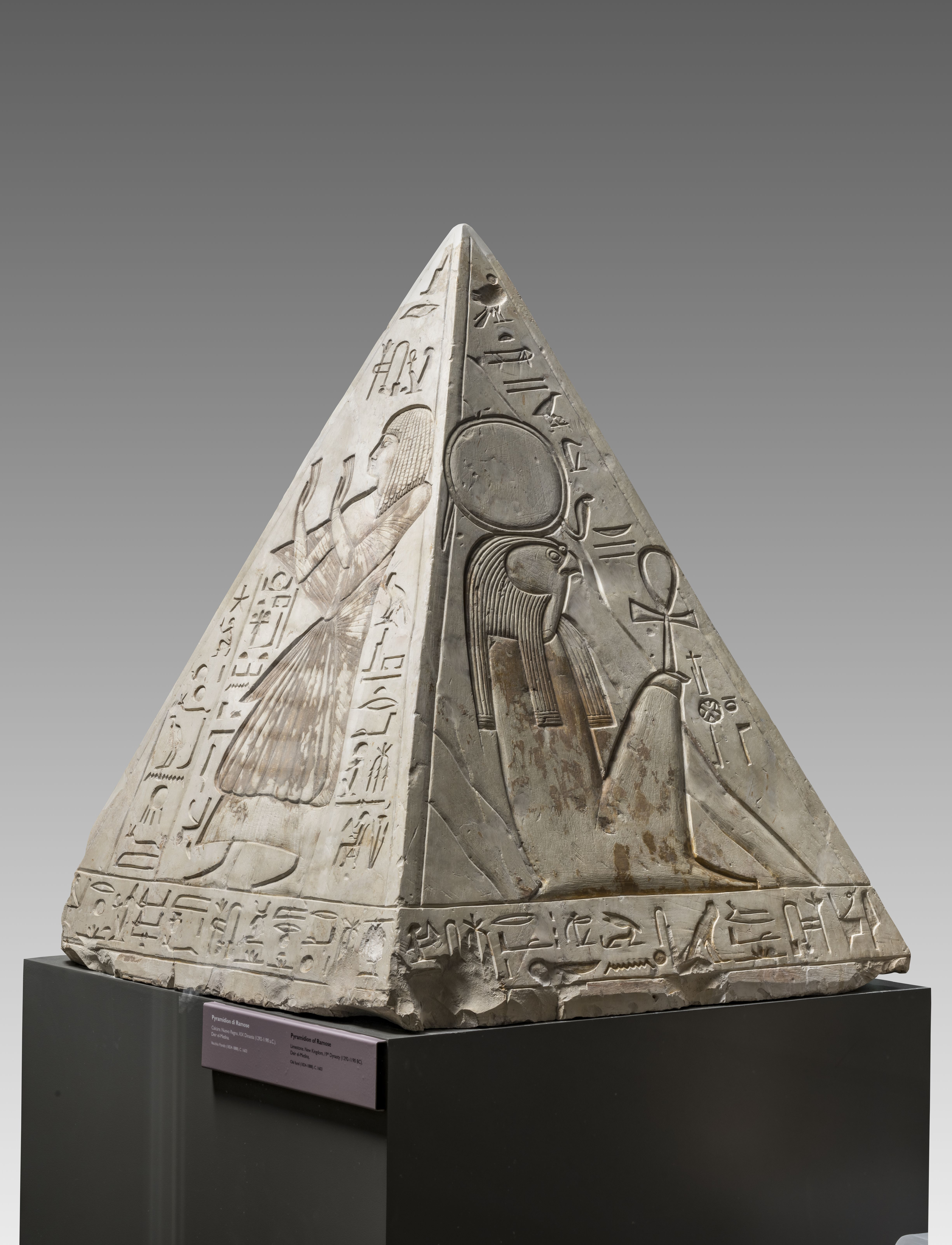
Pyramidion of Ramose, limestone, from Deir el-Medina, Nineteenth Dynasty.

== Description ==
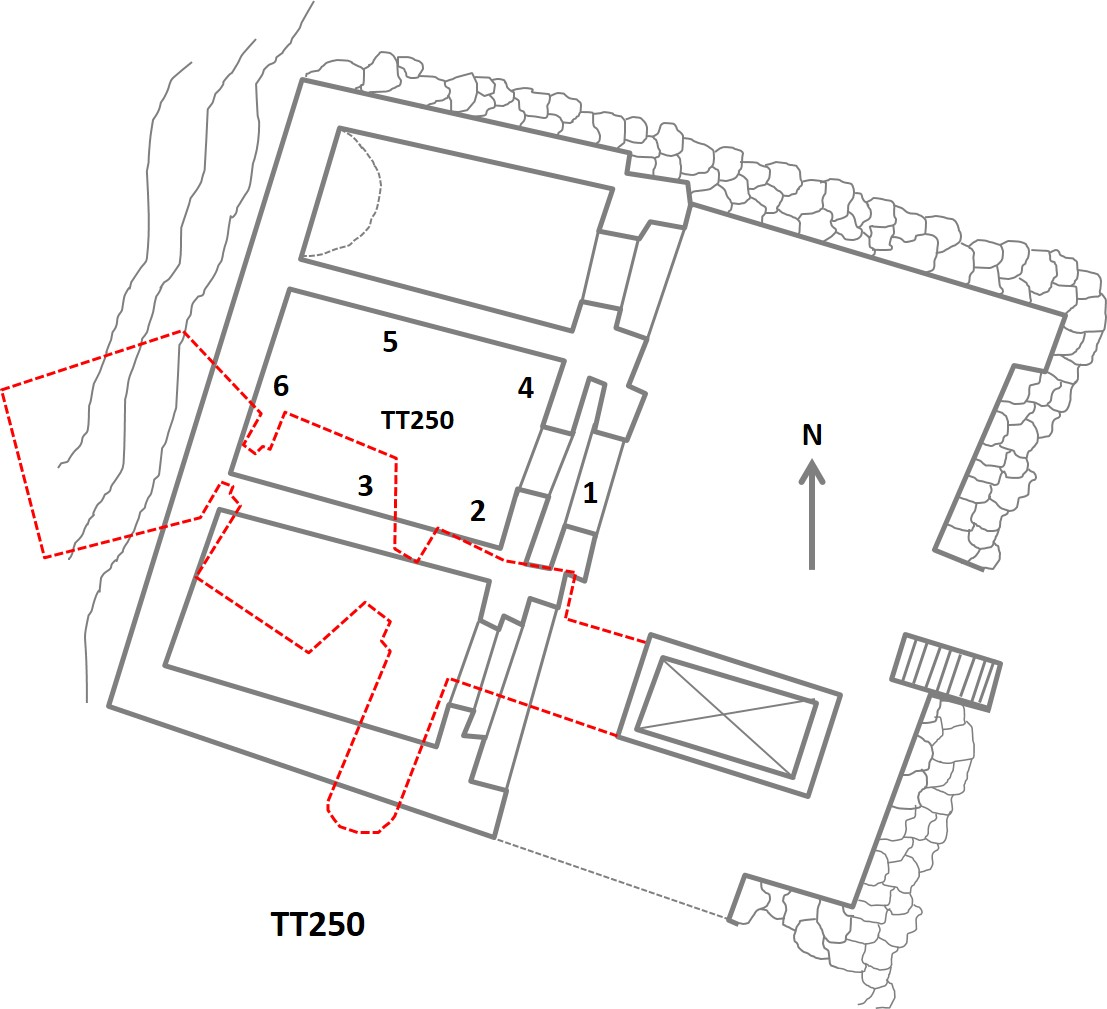
Schematic plan of TT250.

TT250 is located in the centre of the necropolis of Deir el-Medina, below the excavation house of the Institut français d'archéologie orientale. The tomb consists of three adjacent chapels built of baked brick and preceded by a courtyard; only the central chapel, a simple rectangular room, is decorated. The north chapel is 1.40 m (4.6 ft) wide, 2.60 m (8.5 ft) deep and 2.10 m (6.9 ft) high; the central chapel is 1.83 m (6.0 ft) wide, 2.65 m (8.7 ft) deep and 1.95 m (6.4 ft) high; the south chapel, whose roof had collapsed, is 1.62 m (5.3 ft) wide and 2.63 m (8.6 ft) deep; the courtyard measures 6.15 m (20.2 ft) by 3.70 m (12.1 ft). The shaft in the courtyard, about 4.50 m (14.8 ft) deep, gives access to the underground burial apartment, which consists of three undecorated rooms set one after another.

The decoration of the central chapel is especially important: TT250 is the only known tomb at Deir el-Medina in which the chapel, and not only a burial chamber, was decorated in monochrome style. The decoration makes broad use of yellow ochre on a white ground, with red and black used for details, inscriptions and dividing lines. About thirty tombs in the Theban Necropolis, twenty-two of them assigned to the Ramesside period, contain rooms decorated in monochrome; these rooms are usually burial chambers or ceilings. TT250 is exceptional because its monochrome decoration is in the chapel. A comparable use of monochrome painting is found in the tomb of Queen Nefertari, Great Royal Wife of Ramesses II, where a niche for the canopic jars shows the four sons of Horus and the goddess Nut in yellow monochrome, an effect recalling the papyri of the Book of the Dead and the colour of gold associated with the flesh of the gods. The use of monochrome painting was concentrated in the Nineteenth Dynasty, declined in the Twentieth Dynasty and is not attested from the reign of Ramesses IV.

The tomb was formerly attributed to Neferhotep, who is shown in a wall scene with his wife and son, and to Amenmes. The attribution to Ramose depends on the reading of a lateral inscription on a stela, where "the Osiris, the Scribe in the Place of Truth, Ramose, justified" is mentioned, and on the identification of texts referring to Amenemheb and Kakaia, the father and mother of Ramose, in scenes of funerary procession.

A short passage, whose walls show a woman and a child, leads into the rectangular hall. The walls preserve scenes of funerary processions of men and women; on the right side of one scene appear the mummies of four women, the feature from which the traditional name "tomb of the female servants" derives. The women and the named members of the workmen's community have led to the interpretation of the tomb not only as a funerary chapel but also as a place of remembrance connected with Ramose's family and with the community of Deir el-Medina under Ramesses II.

On other walls, in three registers one above another, are fragments of people before Neferhotep (TT216), his wife Iyemuau and his son Nebnefer (TT6). Figures also appear before Hathor represented as a sacred cow and, in two scenes, a man with a jar containing grain stands before seated people and before six seated women. On the rear wall is a stela in three registers: the deceased adores Osiris, the wife adores Amenhotep I, and, in a double scene, men adore Anubis and Queen Ahmose-Nefertari. The chapel also includes scenes of libation, priests with instruments for the Opening of the Mouth ceremony, a lector priest and five women preceding five female mummies, who are accompanied to their tomb by mourning sisters. (Note: Lector priests organized ceremonies and recited the required hymns aloud during sacred rites; because they knew the correct invocations, they were regarded as holders of magical power.)

== Other tombs of Ramose at Deir el-Medina ==
The other tombs attributed to Ramose in the necropolis of Deir el-Medina are TT7 and TT212. The three tombs have been interpreted as complexes with different purposes: TT7 as the personal tomb of Ramose, TT250 as a tomb for the women around Ramose or Mutemwia, and TT212 as a complex left at an early stage of work. Gobeil has proposed that TT212, by comparison with TT250, may have been connected with the men around Ramose.

The pyramidion of Ramose in the Museo Egizio, Turin, Cat. 1603, comes from Deir el-Medina and dates to the Nineteenth Dynasty. It has been connected with the brick pyramid above the chapel of one of the three tombs attributed to Ramose, although the specific tomb is not identified.

== See also ==
- Deir el-Medina
- List of Theban tombs
- Theban Necropolis
- Tombs of the Nobles (Luxor)
- Valley of the Kings
