= Ramose (TT7) =

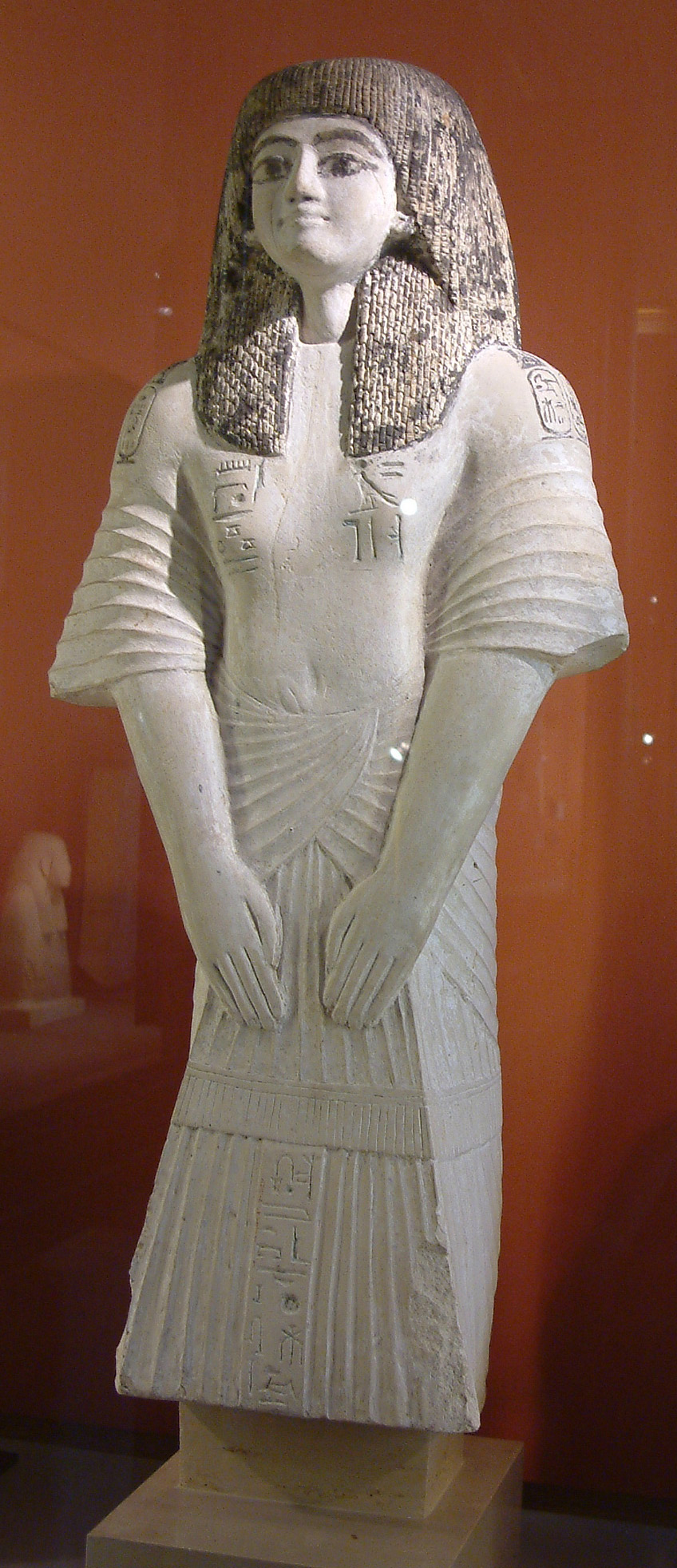
High-gloss painted limestone statue of Ramose, inscribed with hieroglyphs and cartouches. (atypical scribe statue, reflecting his high standing). Found in 1939 in the khenu of Ramesses II at Deir el-Medina, room 9, shaft no. 1414; Paris, Louvre (E 16346).

Ramose was an ancient Egyptian scribe and artisan who lived in Deir el-Medina on the west bank of the Nile, opposite Thebes, during the reigns of Ramesses II. He held the position of Scribe of the Tomb, the highest administrative position for a scribe in Deir el-Medina, from around years 5 to 38 of Ramesses II's reign. He was buried in a tomb in the village necropolis.

Ramose created a total of three tombs for himself in the Theban Necropolis, TT7, TT212 and TT250.

== Family ==
Ramose was the son of the retainer Amenemheb and the Lady Kakaia. He was married to the Lady Mutemwia (Wia), daughter of the royal scribe Huy and Nofretkau.

Despite extensive offerings to fertility gods like Hathor, Min and Taweret, Ramose and Wia were unable to have a biological child. Ramose is thought to have adopted the scribe Qenhirkhopeshef so that the latter could inherit his estate.

== Career ==
Ramose started out training as a scribe at one of the Theban schools. According to a stela in the Bankes collection he served as Treasury chief in the House of Menkheperure, chief of the administration in the house of the superintendent of the seal, scribe who reckons the cattle of Amun-Ra, assistant-scribe of the correspondence of the hereditary prince. Černý first posed the theory that the hereditary prince was the future Ramesses II, but later considered the possibility that the title referred to the famous Amenhotep Son of Hapu.

An ostracon records the fact that Ramose was appointed as Scribe in the Place of Truth in year 5, the 3rd month of Akhet, day 10 of the reign of Ramesses II. This appointment was likely made at the recommendation of the Vizier Paser who was responsible for all appointments in Deir el-Medina. Paser and Ramose would work together for many years and were responsible for installing a cult sanctuary – the khenu – for the living god at the sanctuary of Hathor. He was active until at least year 38. Because of the multiple tombs and numerous monuments he left behind, Ramose is estimated to be the wealthiest person who had ever lived in Deir el-Medina up until that point.

== See also ==
- List of ancient Egyptian scribes
