= TT7 =

Ancient Egyptian tomb near Luxor

Coordinates: 25.7333°N 32.6000°E

Theban tomb TT7
- Burial site of Ramose
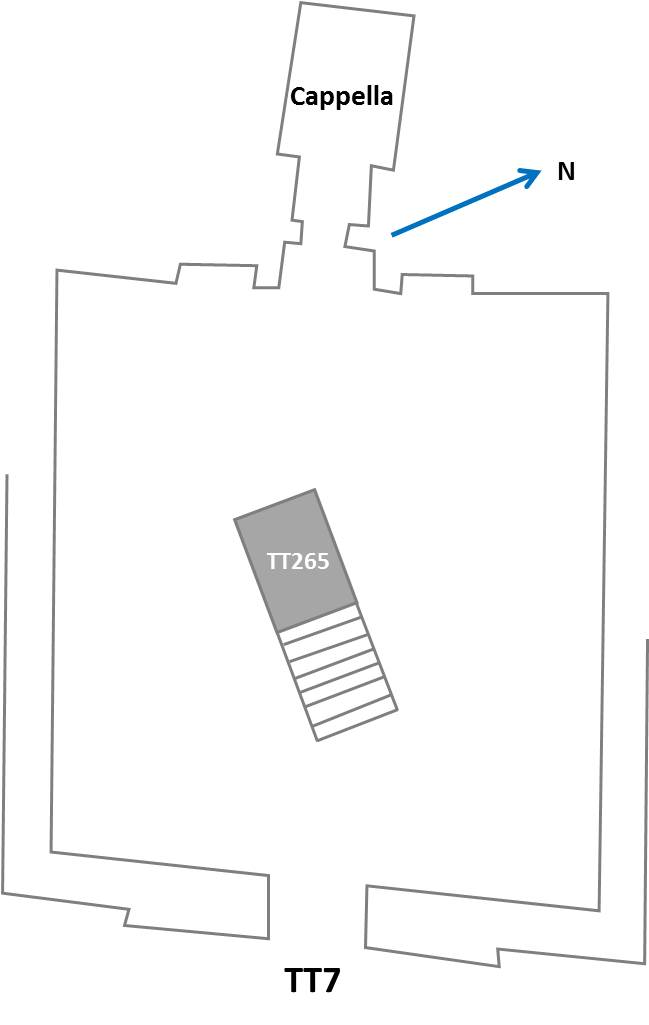
- Schematic plan of TT7

- Location within Egypt
- Location: Deir el-Medina, Theban Necropolis
- Discovered: Nineteenth Dynasty, reign of Ramesses II
- Decoration: Scenes of royal and divine figures, including Amenhotep I, Ahmose-Nefertari, Horemheb, Thutmose IV, Ramesses II and the Theban Triad
- Layout: Court and decorated chapel
- ← Previous; TT6 Next → TT8

r a N5 Z1 ms s
Ramose
in hieroglyphs
Era: New Kingdom
(1550–1069 BC)

The Theban Tomb TT7 is located in Deir el-Medina, part of the Theban Necropolis, on the west bank of the Nile, opposite Luxor. It is the burial place of the ancient Egyptian artisan and Scribe in the Place of Truth named Ramose, who lived during the Nineteenth Dynasty, during the reign of Ramesses II.

Ramose also created a total of three tombs for himself in the necropolis, the others being TT212 and TT250. TT7 is interpreted as Ramose's personal tomb, while TT212 and TT250 have been connected respectively with the male and female entourage of Ramose or of his family.

== Tomb owner ==
TT7 was the tomb of Ramose, a Scribe in the Place of Truth under Ramesses II. The title connected Ramose with the community of artisans at Deir el-Medina, the village responsible for excavating and decorating the royal tombs of the nearby valleys.

Ramose

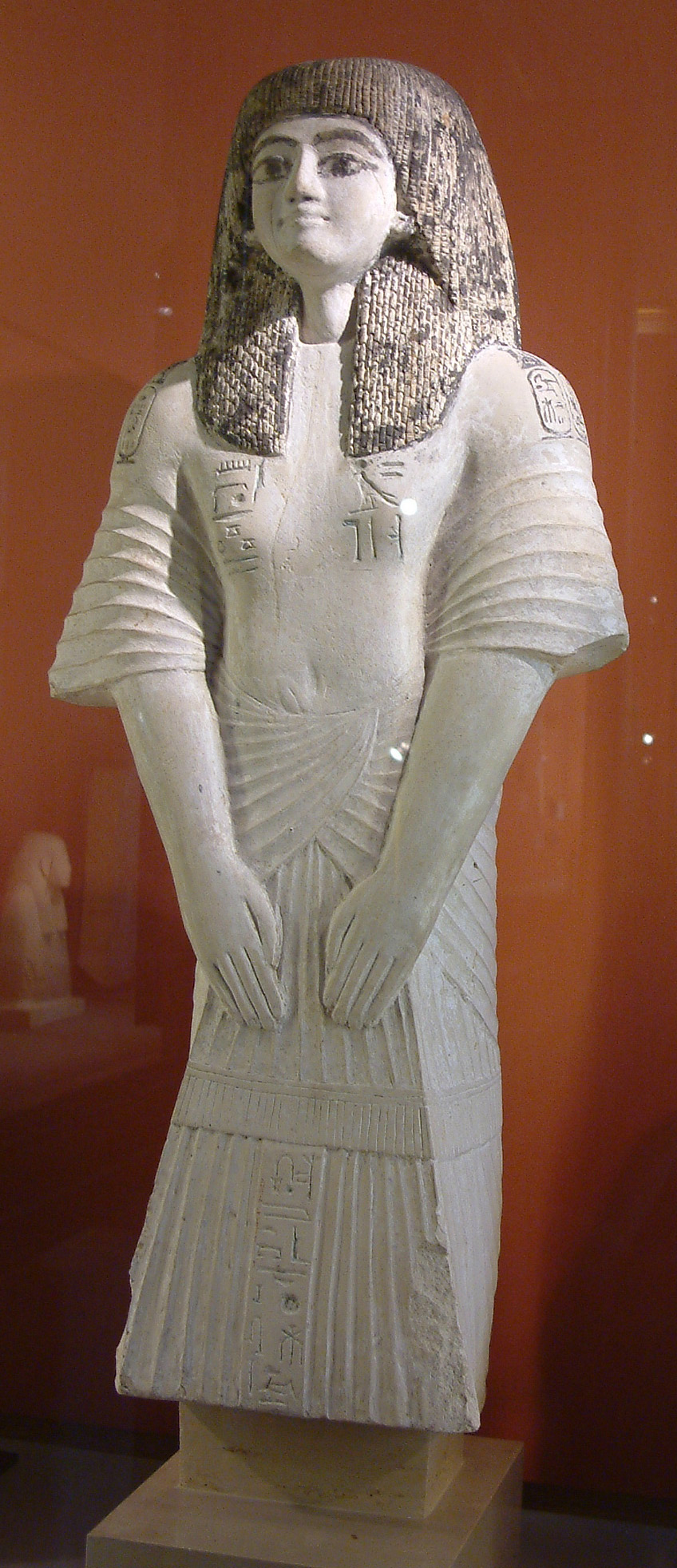
Statue of Ramose, painted limestone, found in 1939 in the khenu of Ramesses II at Deir el-Medina, room 9, shaft no. 1414. Paris, Louvre (E 16346).

== Objects associated with Ramose ==
The name of Ramose is attested on several objects from Deir el-Medina now held in the Museo Egizio, including limestone stela fragments acquired during Schiaparelli's 1905 excavation, a limestone statue-base fragment acquired during Schiaparelli's 1909 excavation, a limestone stela dedicated by the royal scribe Ramose to the goddess Qetesh between Min and Reshep, and a limestone pyramidion dated to the Nineteenth Dynasty.

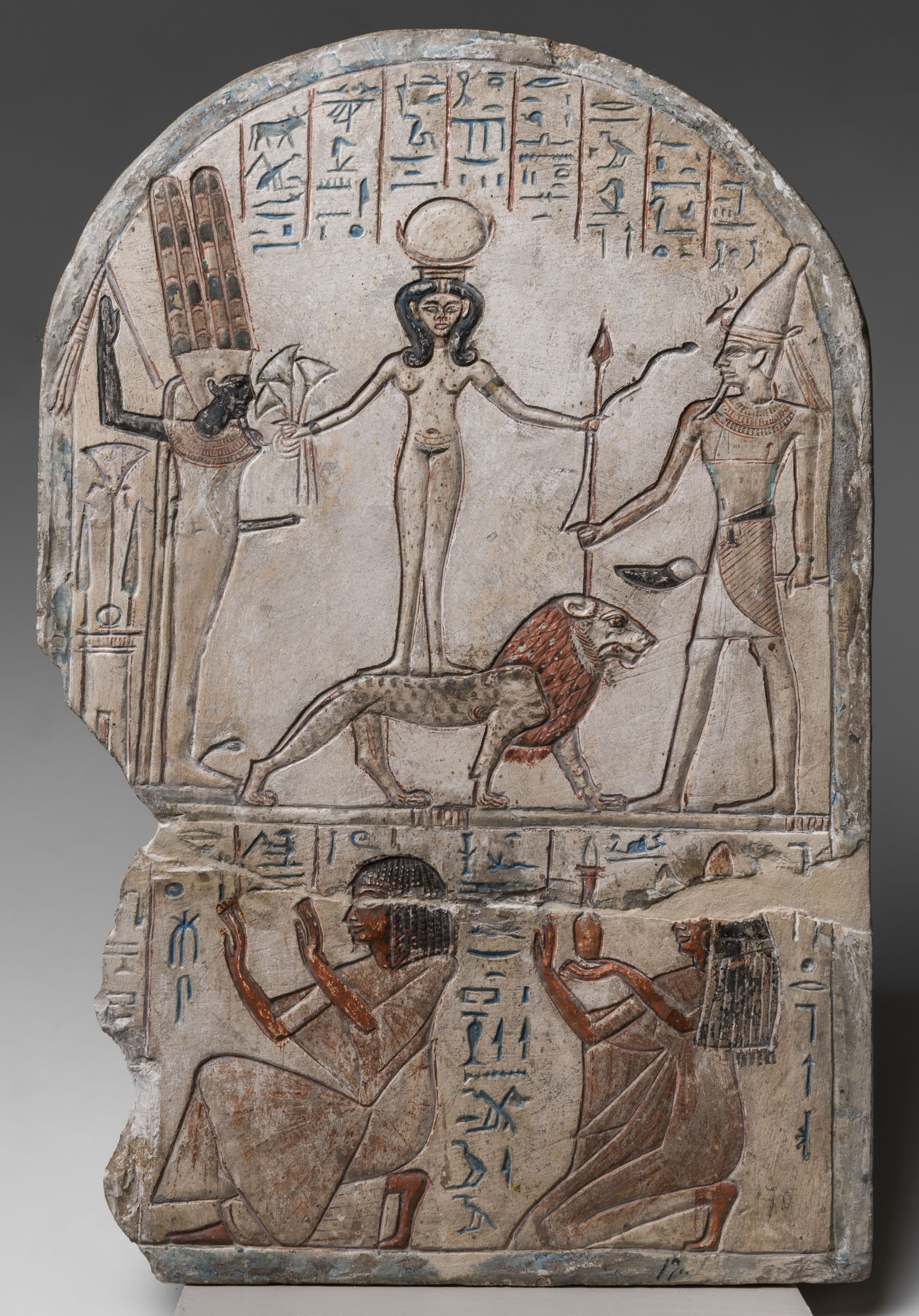
Limestone stela dedicated by the royal scribe Ramose to Qetesh, shown between Min and Reshep, from Deir el-Medina, Nineteenth Dynasty. Museo Egizio, Turin.

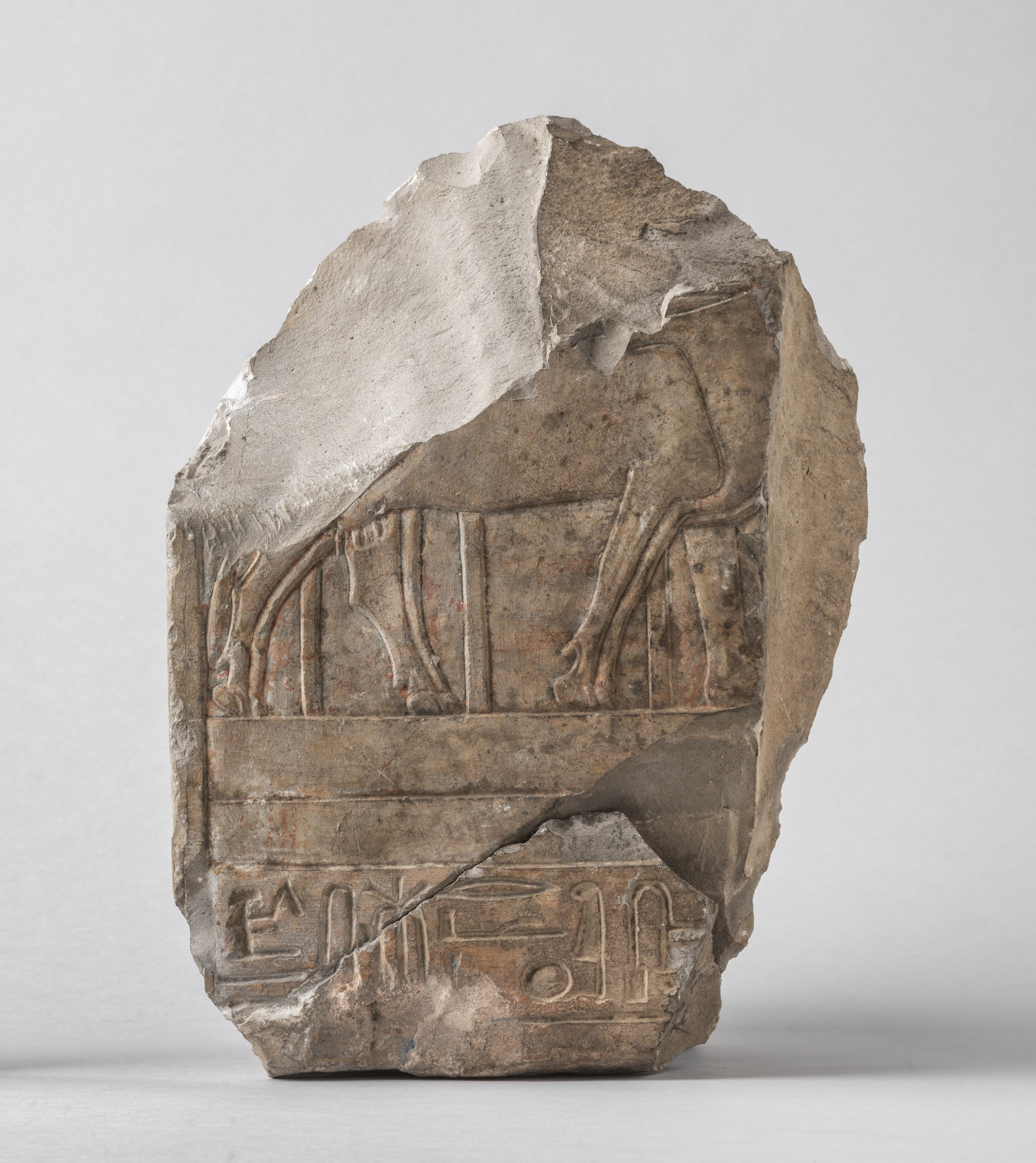
Stela fragments with the name of the scribe Ramose, limestone, from Deir el-Medina, reign of Ramesses II. Museo Egizio, Turin.

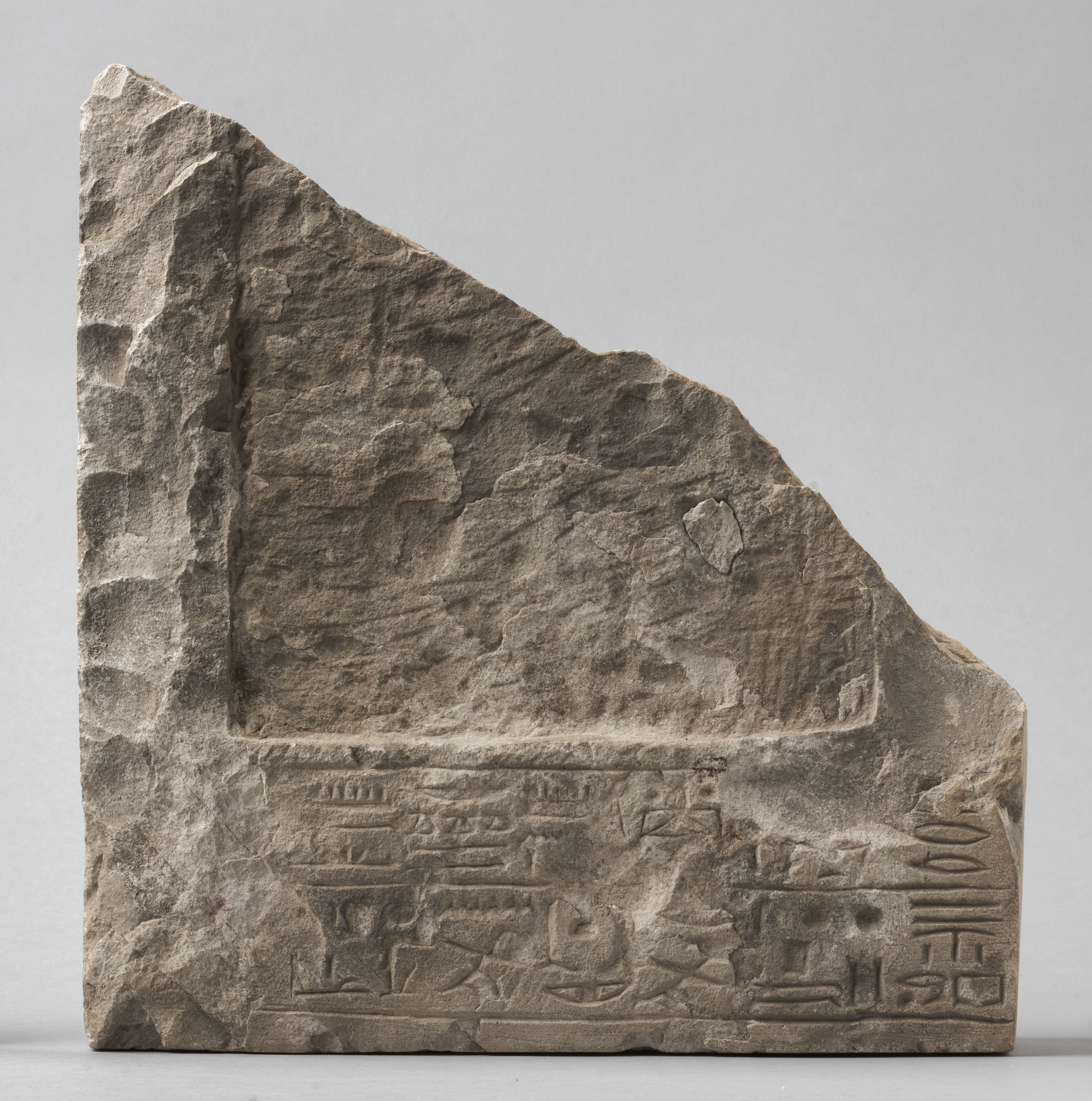
Fragment of a statue base with the name of the scribe Ramose, limestone, from Deir el-Medina, Nineteenth Dynasty. Museo Egizio, Turin.

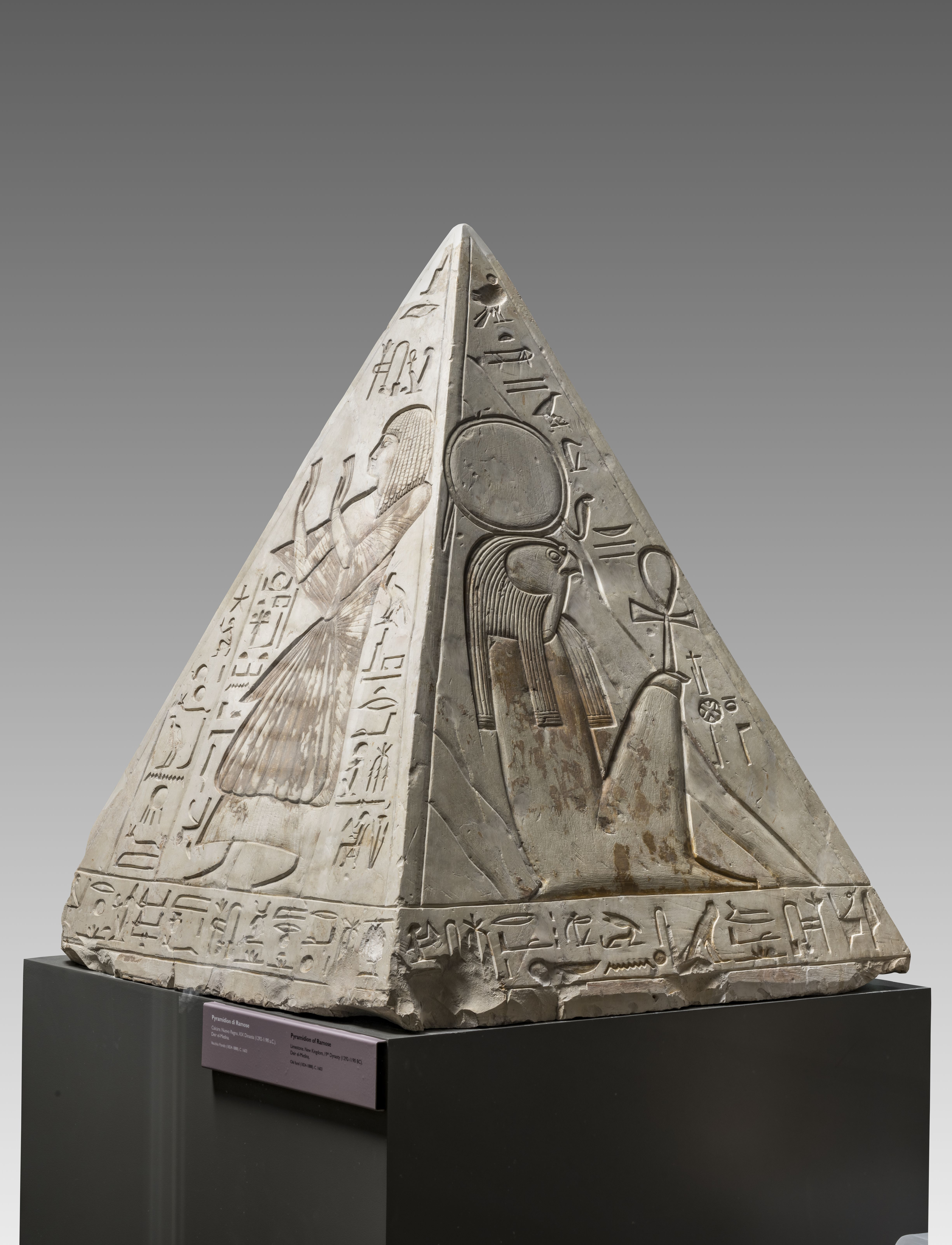
Pyramidion of Ramose, limestone, from Deir el-Medina, Nineteenth Dynasty. Museo Egizio, Turin.

== Excavation and documentation ==
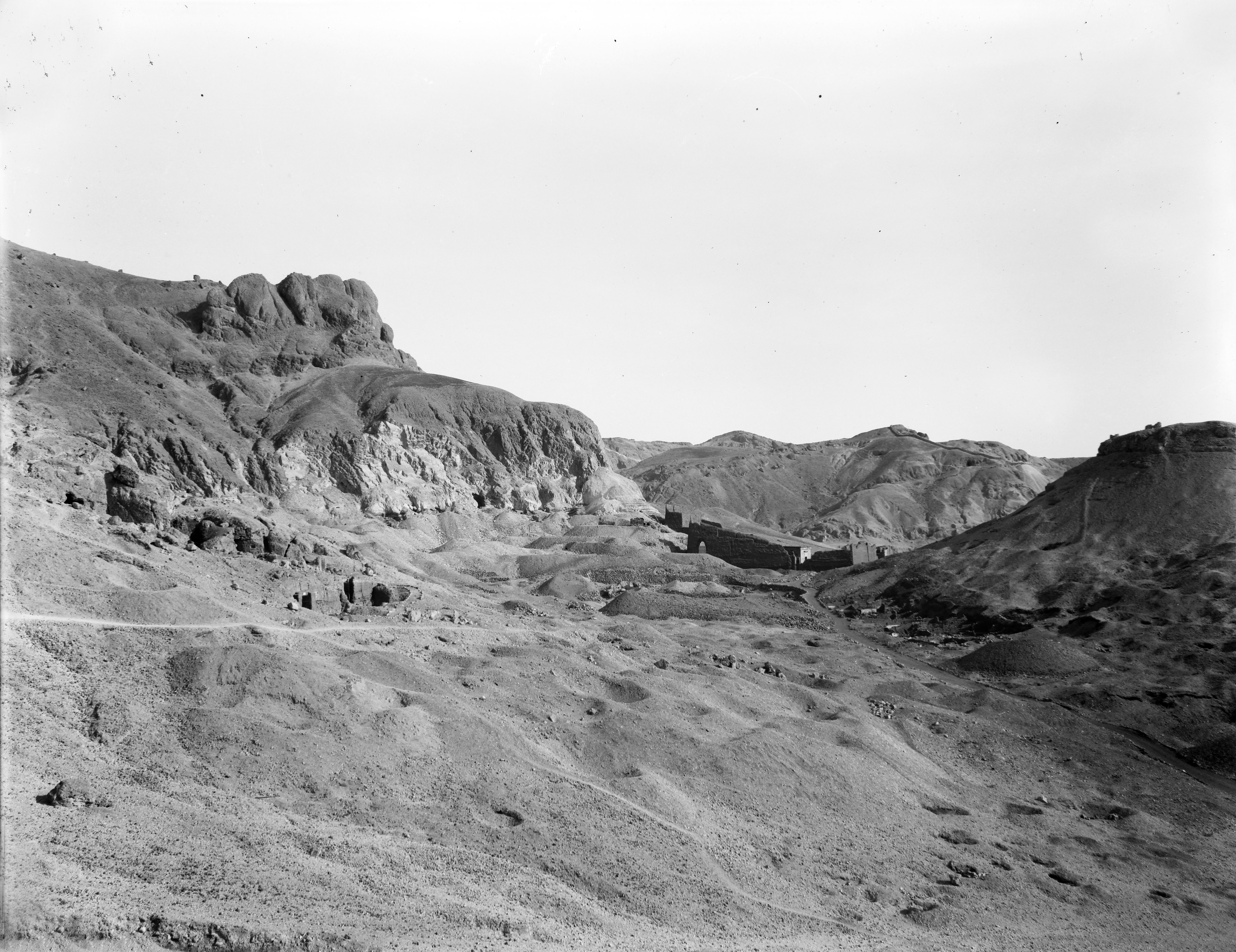
View of the valley floor of Deir el-Medina during Schiaparelli's excavations, 1906–1909. Museo Egizio Photo Archive, Turin.

The photographic database of the Institut français d'archéologie orientale records two exterior photographs of TT7 taken in 1974, and lists a plate published by Bernard Bruyère in 1926 and a publication in preparation by J.-P. Corteggiani. The Museo Egizio Photo Archive holds a photograph of the west wall of the chapel chamber of TT7, dated to 1905–1914 and recorded under plate C00106.

Between 1905 and 1909, Ernesto Schiaparelli and the Italian Archaeological Mission excavated the site of Deir el-Medina, including the village, the votive area and the necropolis. The Museo Egizio Photo Archive also preserves photographs of the Schiaparelli excavations in the village, temple and chapels of Deir el-Medina from 1905 to 1909.

== Description ==
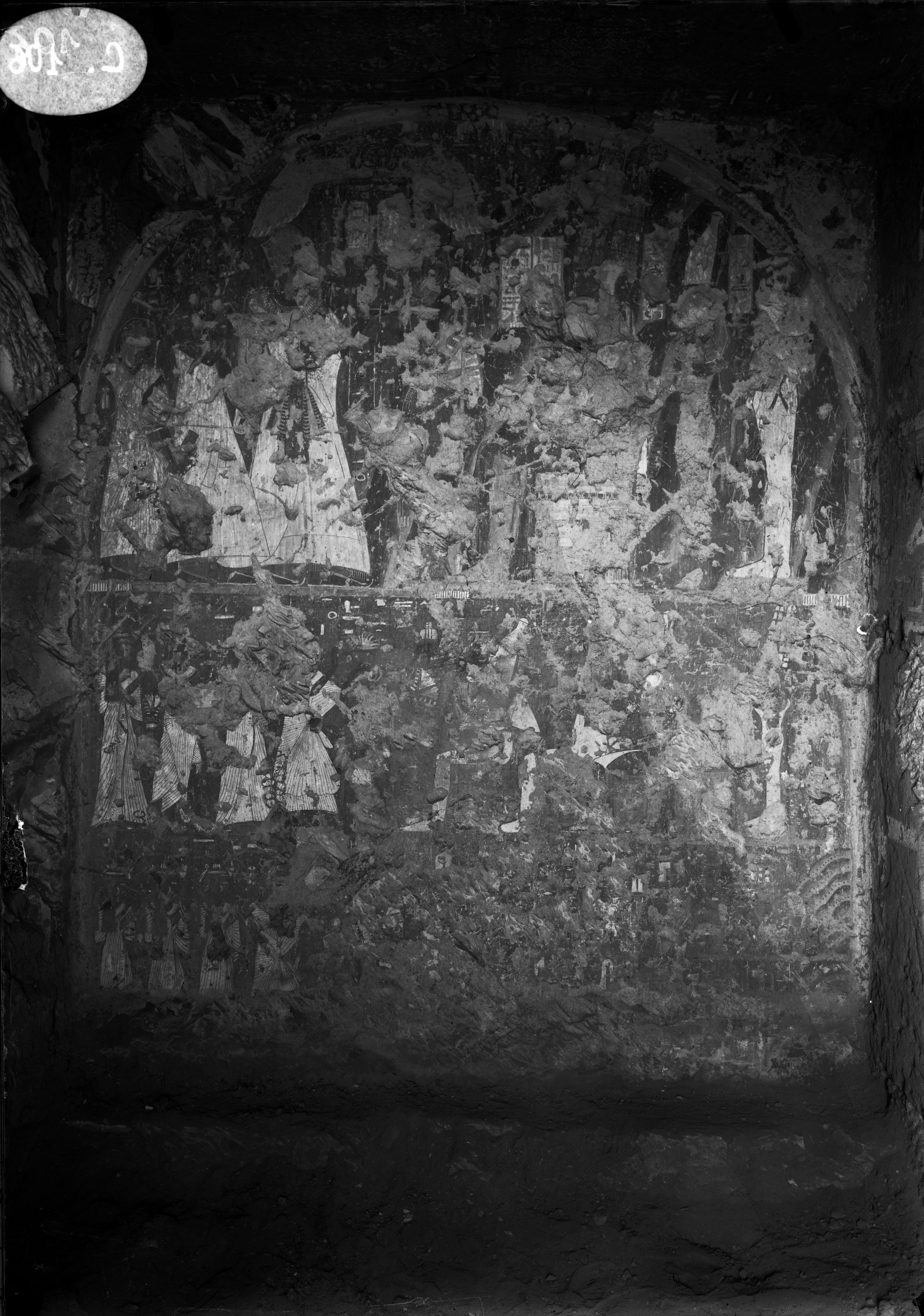
Decorated west wall of the chapel chamber of TT7, the tomb of Ramose, 1905–1914. Museo Egizio Photo Archive, Turin.

TT7 is situated at the top of a row of tombs at Deir el-Medina, north of TT216 and high above TT212. The tomb consists of a court and a chapel. The court was enclosed by a brick wall, and the access shaft of TT265, the tomb of Amenemopet, also opened in the same court. Two niches were cut on either side of the doorway and were intended for two stelae; one of these stelae survives, with a representation of the goddess Hathor and an inscription. At the entrance, Ramose is shown adoring Atum and Ra-Horakhty, and remains of a figure of the goddess Nut with outstretched arms are also recorded.

The chapel consists of a single chamber with damaged decoration. The preserved scenes include Amenhotep I, Ahmose-Nefertari, Horemheb and Thutmose IV. Another scene shows King Ramesses II, followed by the vizier Paser, offering before the Theban Triad: Amun, Mut and Khonsu. Another wall shows the barque of Osiris flanked by the goddesses Isis and Nephthys.

== Other tombs of Ramose at Deir el-Medina ==
In addition to TT7, two other tombs in the same necropolis are attributed to Ramose: TT212 and TT250. The three tombs have been interpreted as complexes with different functions: TT7 as Ramose's personal tomb, TT250 as a tomb connected with the female entourage of Ramose or of Mutemwia, and TT212 as an unfinished complex that may have been intended for the male entourage of Ramose. TT250 is also traditionally described as the "tomb of the slave women".

== See also ==
- List of Theban tombs
- Deir el-Medina
- Theban Necropolis
- Tombs of the Nobles (Luxor)
