= TT213 =

Theban tomb

Coordinates: 25.7333°N 32.6000°E

Theban tomb TT213
- Burial site of Penamun
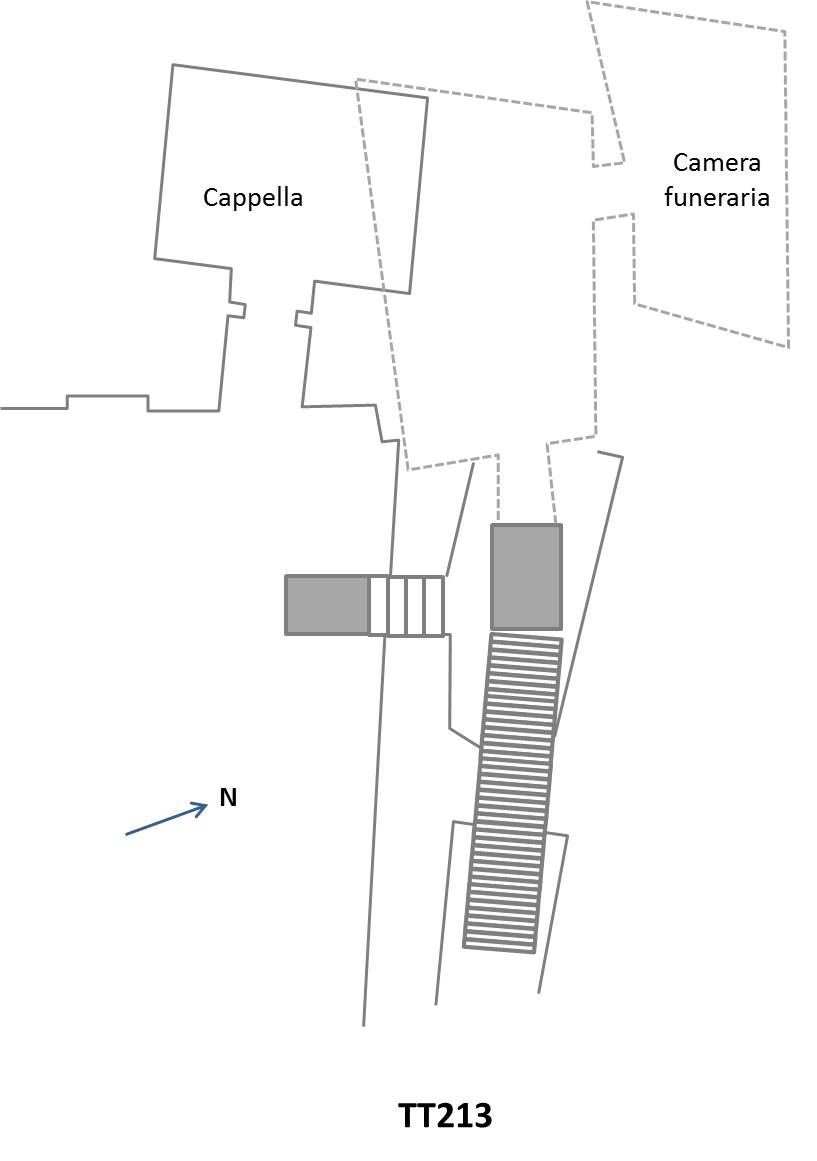

- Location within Egypt
- Location: Deir el-Medina, Theban Necropolis
- ← Previous; TT212 Next → TT214

p n i mn n
Penamun
in hieroglyphs
Era: New Kingdom
(1550–1069 BC)

The Theban Tomb TT213 is located in Deir el-Medina, part of the Theban Necropolis, on the west bank of the Nile, opposite to Luxor.

TT213 is the burial place of the ancient Egyptian servant of the Lord of the Two Lands and servant in the Place of Truth named Penamun, who lived during the 19th Dynasty. Penamun lived in Deir el-Medina during the reign of Ramesses II.

Penamun is the son of Baki, who is buried in TT298 and Taysen. Ḥis wife was named Neb(t)nuhet.

== Tomb ==
TT213 consists of a chapel and a burial chamber.

=== Chapel ===
The lintel contains hetep di nesu texts mentioning Penamun and his wife Neb(t)nuhet. The offerings from the king invoke Ptah, Hathor and Horus, son of Isis. The doorjambs and thicknesses contain texts mentioning a servant in the Place of Truth named Wennenufer, and Penamun's parents Baki and Taysen. In one text Penamun is said to be the son of Amennakht. Penamun and his son Amenmose are mentioned in a hetep di nesu offering to Amenhotep I and Queen Ahmose Nefertari.

=== Burial chamber ===
On the door frame from the entry there is an offering which the king gives to Horakhti-Atum for the servant in the place of Truth Wennufer, who is related to Amennakht. Another offering from the king is given to Ptah-Sokar for the servant in the Place of Truth Khaemwaset and his wife Taweret-herti. A third person was mentioned in the text, but their name was not preserved. A text over the stairs mentions Penamun.

== See also ==
- List of Theban tombs
