= TT214 =

Ancient Egyptian tomb in the Theban Necropolis

Coordinates: 25.7333°N 32.6000°E

Theban tomb TT214
- Burial site of Khawy
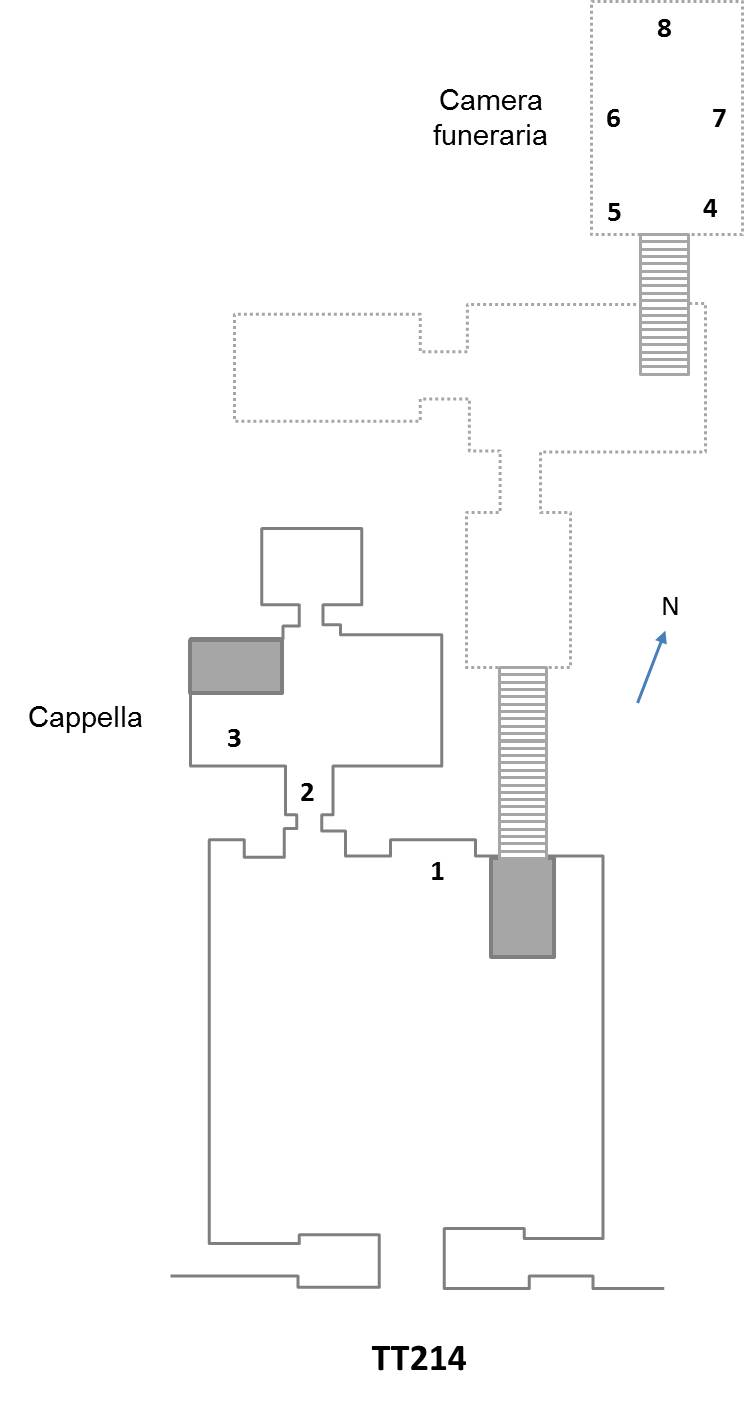

- Location within Egypt
- Location: Deir el-Medina, Theban Necropolis
- ← Previous; TT213 Next → TT215

M12 A w Z4 W3 N5
Khawy
in hieroglyphs
Era: New Kingdom
(1550–1069 BC)

The Theban Tomb TT214 is located in Deir el-Medina, part of the Theban Necropolis, on the west bank of the Nile, opposite to Luxor.

TT214 is the burial place of the ancient Egyptian guardian in the Place of Truth and servitor of Amun of Opet (Luxor) named Khawy, who lived during the 19th Dynasty. Khawy lived in Deir el-Medina during the reign of Ramesses II.

Khawy's wife was named Taweret, and they had a son named Huy.

== Tomb ==
TT214 consists of a court which opens into a chapel. From the court a set of stairs lead to a passageway with a suite of chambers which include a burial chamber at the end. The tomb was furnished with a pyramid.

=== Court ===
The court contains a stela with a double scene depicting Khawy kneeling before Amun and before Re-Harakhti. Khawy and his wife Taweret appear before Osiris.

=== Chapel ===
On a lintel Khawy and Taweret are shown adoring Osiris and Meretseger on the left, and Horus and Isis on the right.

On the thickness at the south side Khawy is shown adoring Shu-Atum and a solar barque. Atum is called the great god residing in Manu. Khawy is also shown before Amun, Lord of Opet (Luxor). In a lower register Khawy and Taweret are shown adoring Amun-Re.

On the thickness at the north side Khawy is shown before a solar barque, which has Isis at its stern. The texts are badly damaged.

=== Burial chamber ===
The burial chamber is decorated with a scene showing Anubis tending the mummy of Khawy. His son Huy is shown mourning his father. The ceiling contains an offering from the king (a hetep di nesu offering) to Ptah and Hathor. Ptah is called the Lord of Truth, King of Both Lands, fair of face, who is mighty in his seat, while Hathor is called chief in Thebes, Lady of Heaven, Mistress of all the gods.

== See also ==
- List of Theban tombs
