= TT211 =

Theban tomb

Theban tomb TT211
- Burial site of Paneb
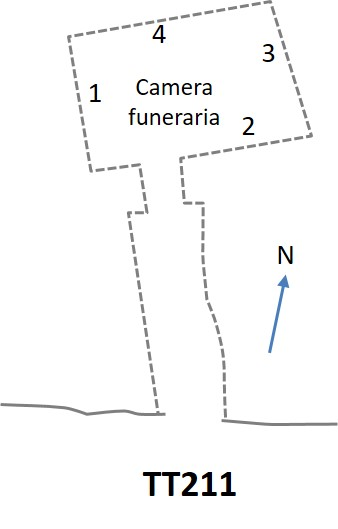

- Location within Egypt
- Location: Deir el-Medina, Theban Necropolis
- ← Previous; TT210 Next → TT212

G40 A nb
Paneb
in hieroglyphs
Era: New Kingdom
(1550–1069 BC)

The Theban Tomb TT211, or Tomb of Paneb, is the burial place of an ancient Egyptian named Paneb, who lived during the 19th Dynasty as a servant of the Lord of the Two Lands in the Place of Truth.

Paneb would have lived in Deir el-Medina during the reign of Ramesses II. He was the son of the servant of the Lord of the Two Lands in the Place of Truth named Nefersenut and his wife Iuy. Ḥe was the grandson of Kasa (TT10). Paneb was married to the Lady of the house Wabet

TT211 is located in Deir el-Medina, part of the Theban Necropolis, on the west bank of the Nile, opposite to Luxor.

Photos from 1905-1914 at the time of the excavations. Photographic Archive of Museo Egizio, Turin.

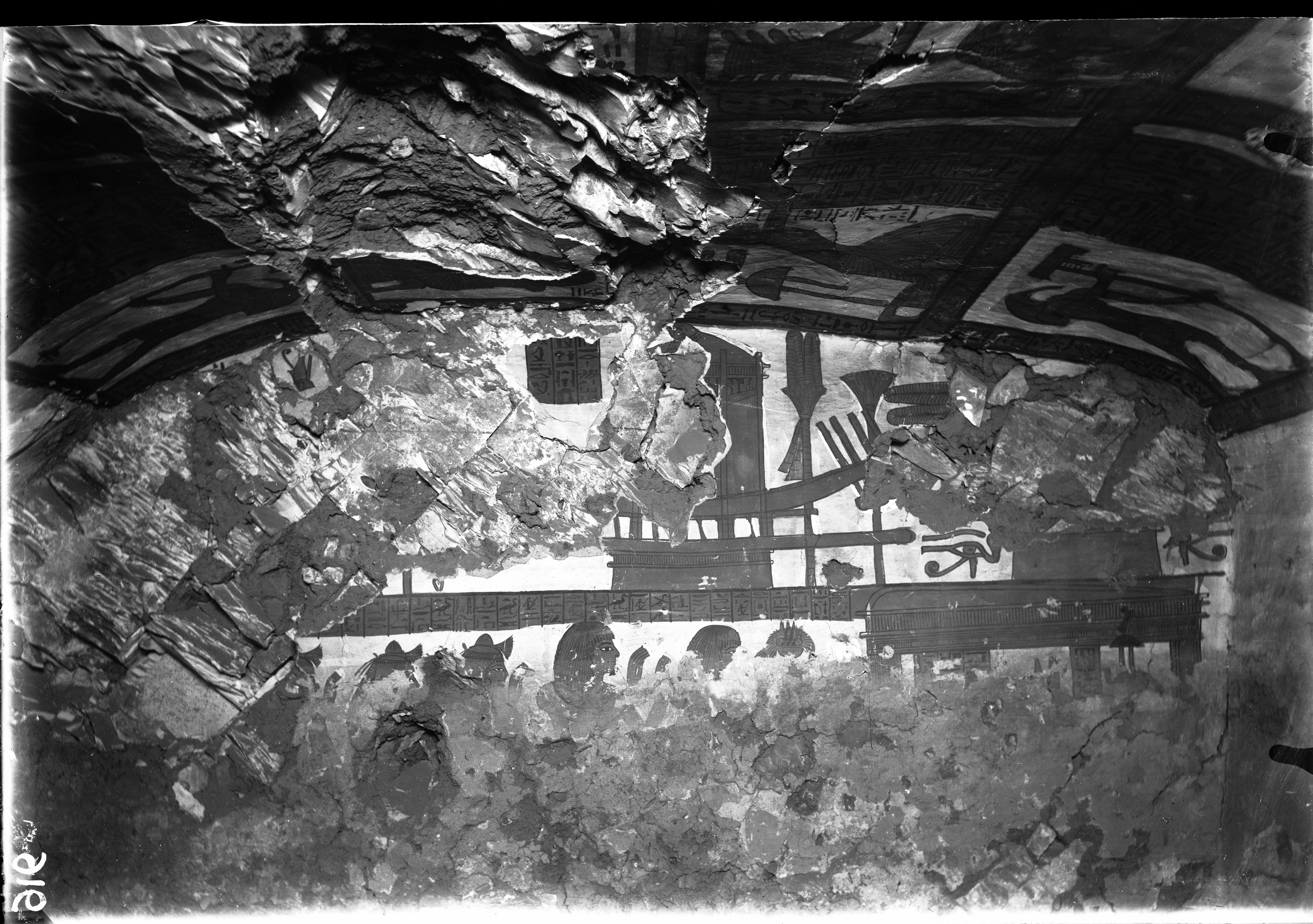
Heavily damaged west wall of the burial chamber of TT 211, the tomb of Paneb.

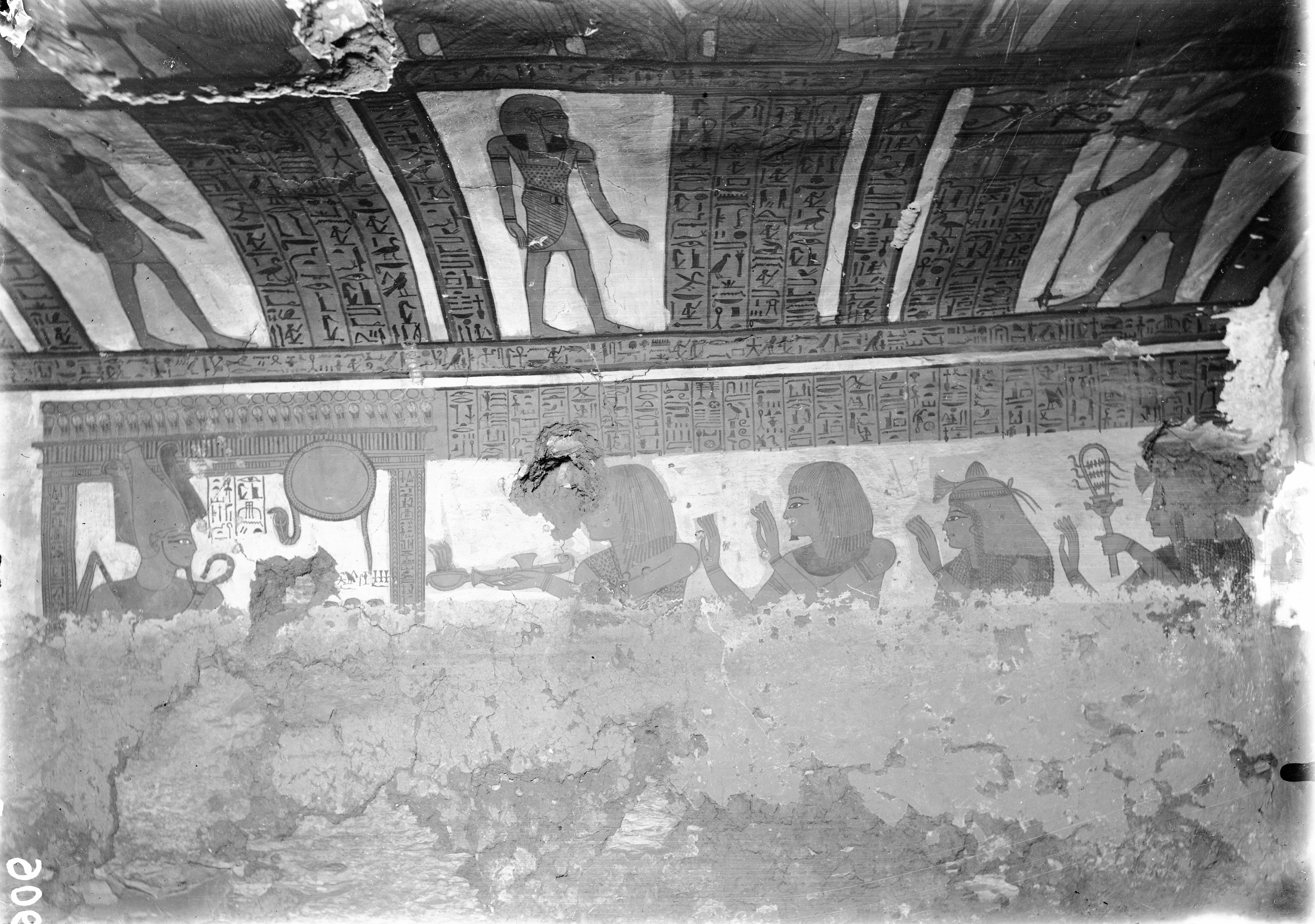
North wall, damaged, and part of the ceiling of the burial chamber of TT211. A scene of worship before the god Osiris is depicted inside a sanctuary.

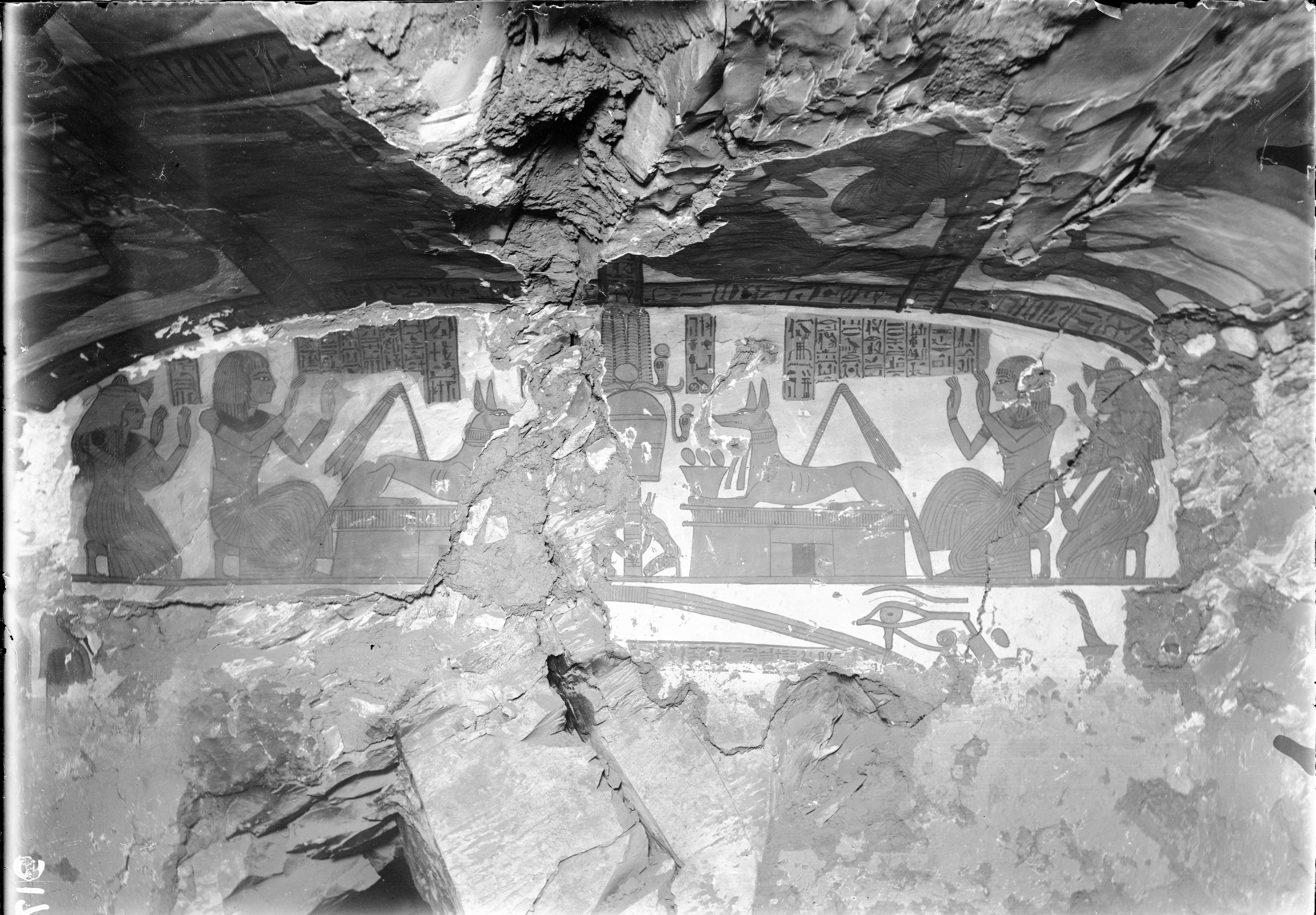
East wall, badly damaged, of the burial chamber of TT211.

== See also ==
- List of Theban tombs
