= TT215 =

Theban tomb

Coordinates: 25.7333°N 32.6000°E

Theban tomb TT215
- Burial site of Amenemopet (shrine and chapel only)
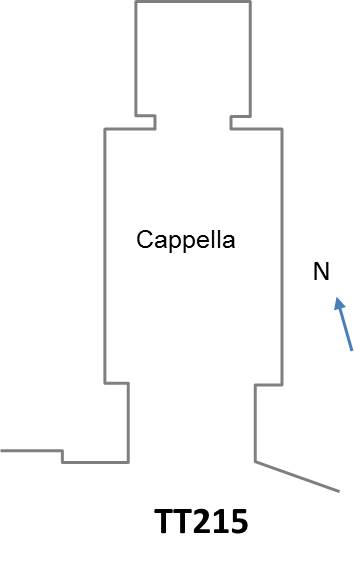

- Location within Egypt
- Location: Deir el-Medina, Theban Necropolis
- ← Previous; TT214 Next → TT216

i mn n Aa13 i p t O45
Amenemopet
in hieroglyphs
Era: New Kingdom
(1550–1069 BC)

The Theban Tomb TT215 is located in Deir el-Medina. It forms part of the Theban Necropolis, situated on the west bank of the Nile opposite Luxor.

TT215 is a chapel and shrine of the ancient Egyptian royal scribe in the Place of Truth named Amenemopet, who lived during the 19th Dynasty. The actual burial place for Amenemopet is TT265. Amenemopet was the son of Minmose and Isis who are mentioned in TT335. Amenemopet's wife was named Hathor and also called Hunero.

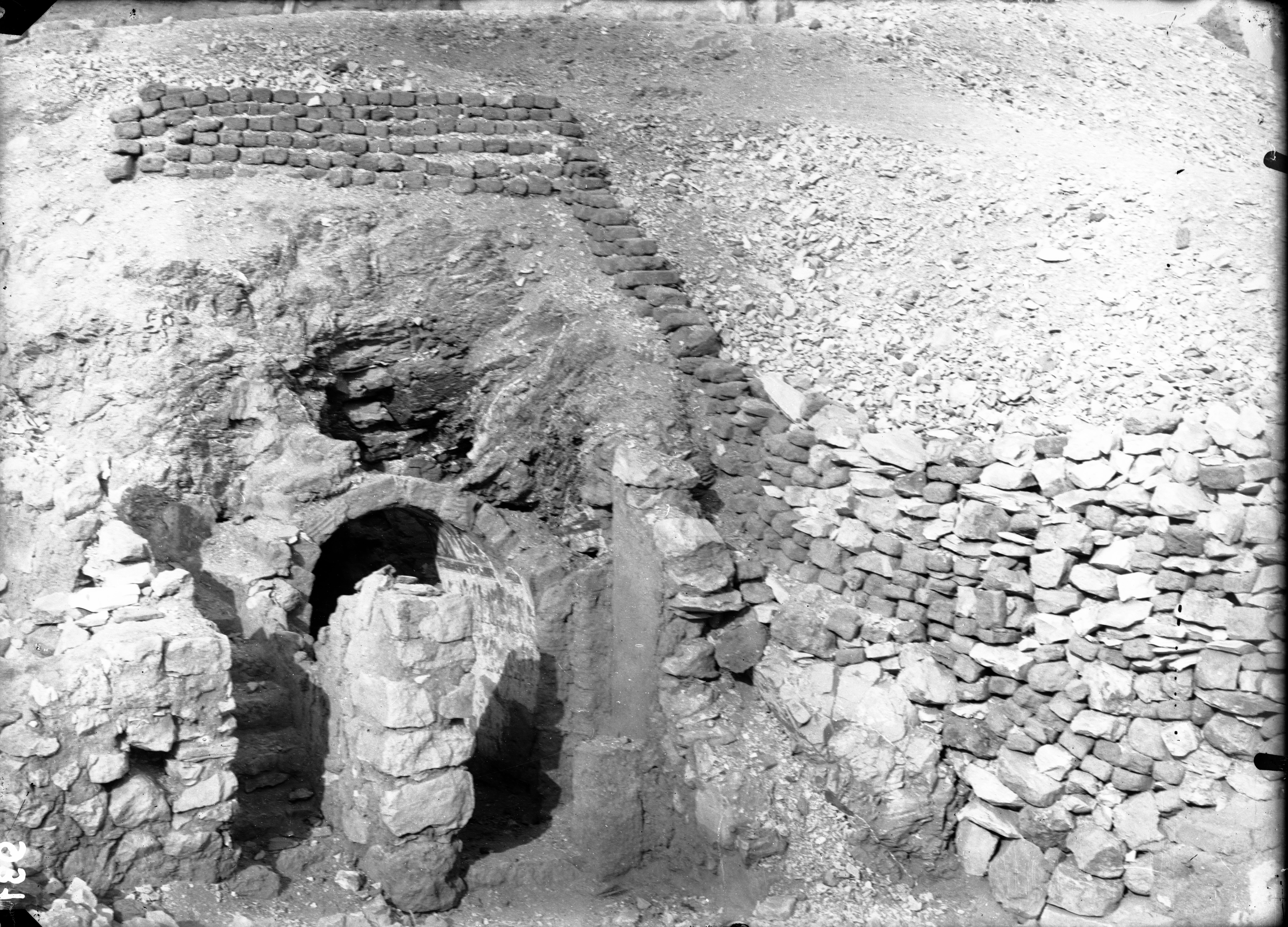
Funerary chapel of tomb TT215 of Amenemopet. The chapel's barrel-vaulted structure was originally covered by a small masonry pyramid. Excavations by Ernesto Schiaparelli, 1909.

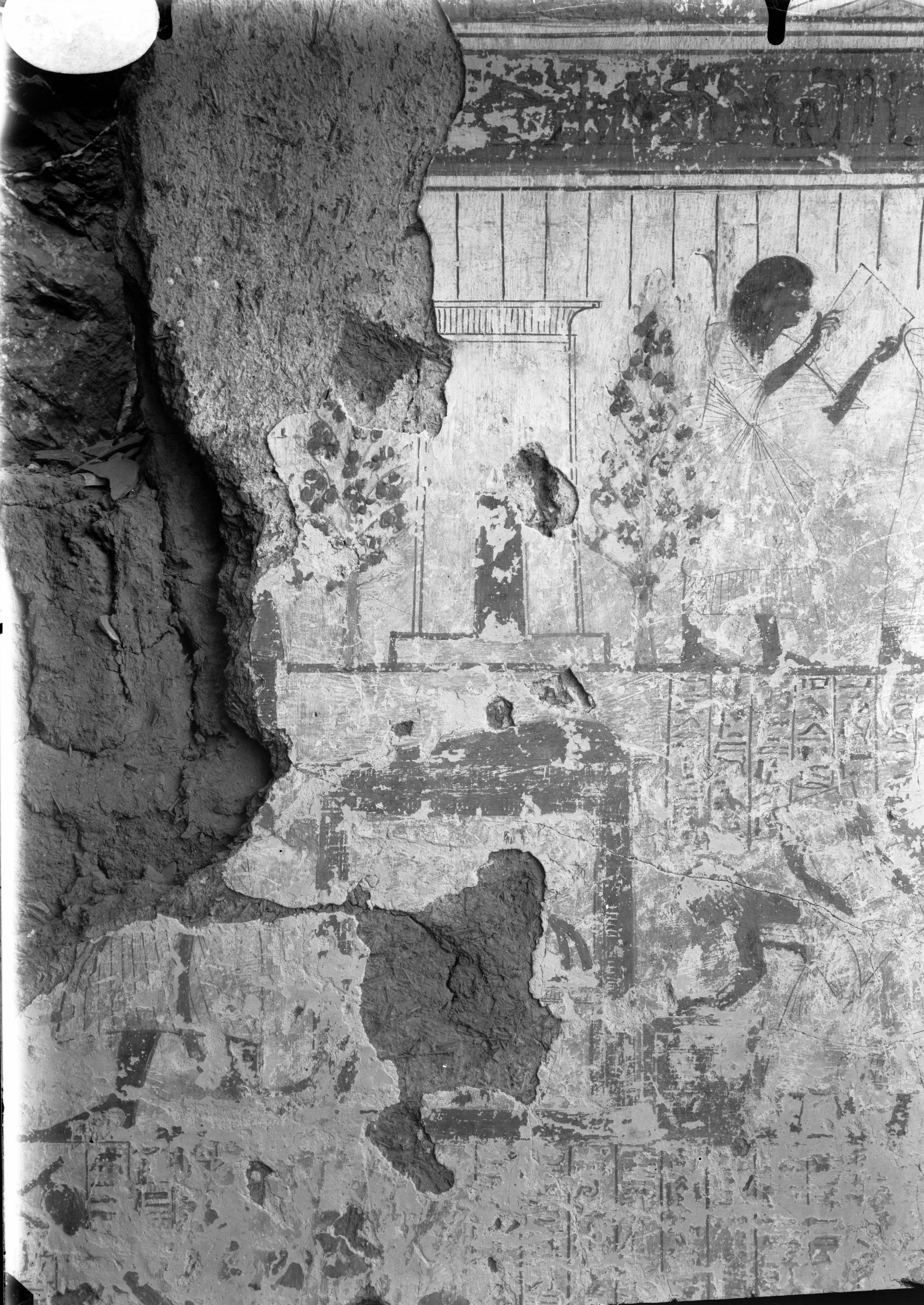
East wall of the chapel. In the upper register, a funeral procession departs from a shrine between two trees. The register below is less visible, but also depicts a funeral procession.

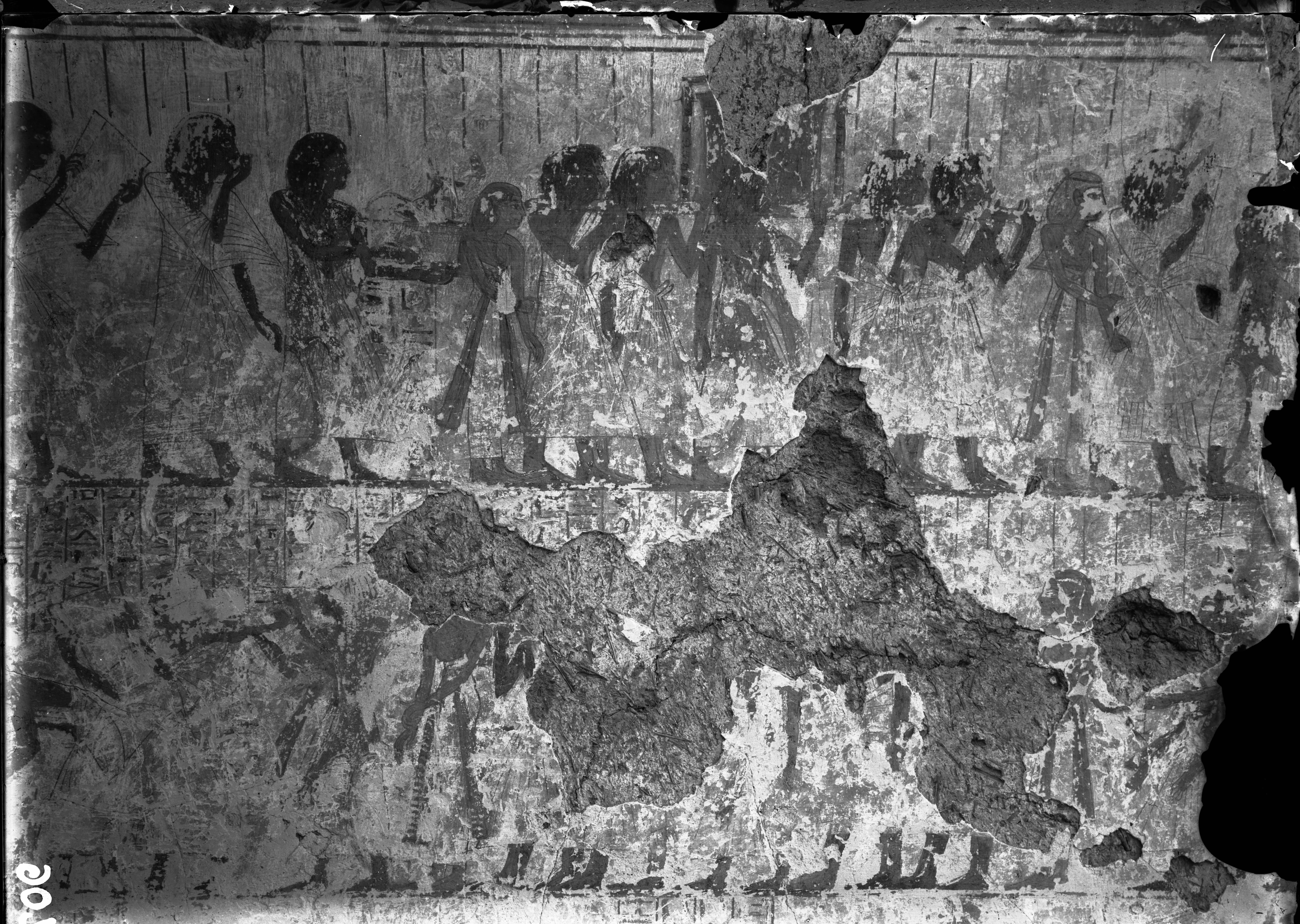
East wall of the chapel.

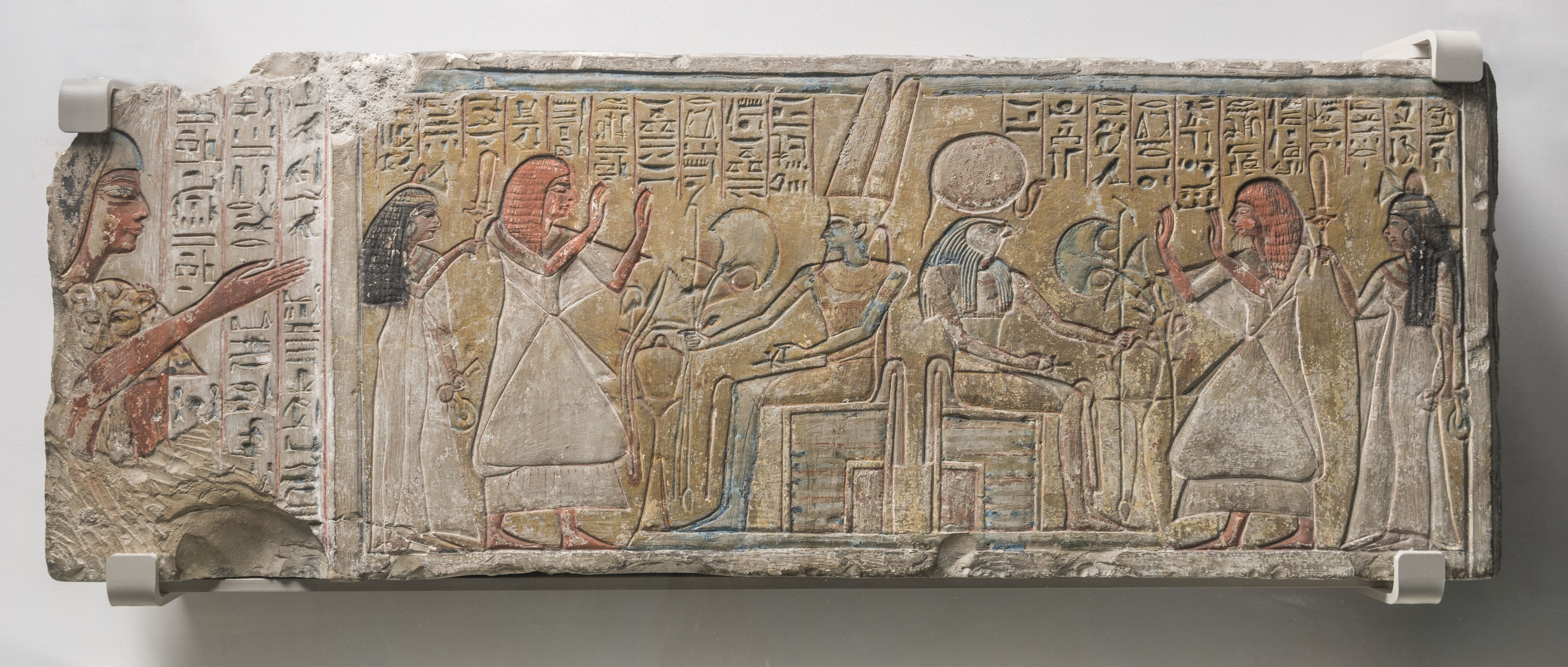
Architrave from the tomb of Amenemopet. Museo Egizio, Turin (Cat. 1516).

== See also ==
- List of Theban tombs
