= TT210 =

Theban tomb

Theban tomb TT210
- Burial site of Raweben
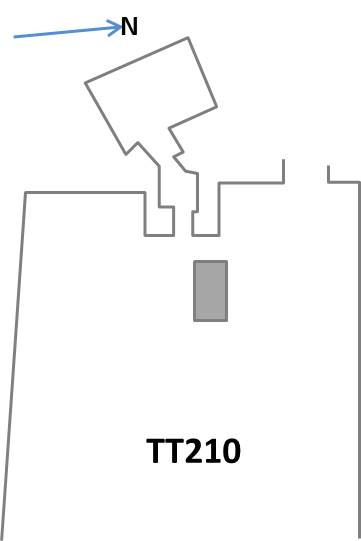

- Location within Egypt
- Location: Deir el-Medina, Theban Necropolis
- ← Previous; TT209 Next → TT211

r a N5 Z1 w b n N8
Raweben
in hieroglyphs
Era: New Kingdom
(1550–1069 BC)

The Theban Tomb TT210, part of the Theban Necropolis, is located in Deir el-Medina, on the west bank of the Nile, opposite to Luxor. TT210 is the burial place of the ancient Egyptian artisan named Raweben, who lived during the 19th Dynasty. Raweben would have lived in Deir el-Medina during the reign of Ramesses II.

== Family ==
Raweben was the son of the sculptor of the Place of Truth named Piay and his wife Nefertkau. Raweben's brother Ipuy (TT217) is also depicted in the tomb, together with Ipuy's sons Nebnakht and Huy. Ḥe was married to the Lady of the house Nebtiunu. They are shown in the tomb accompanied by their sons Huy and Ramose and their daughters Hent-wedjebet, Tahaynu and Raia.

== Tomb ==
On the lintel of the entrance Raweben and his wife and children are shown on one side before Osiris, Isis, Horus, Hathor and Ptah. On the other side of the lintel Raweben's father Piay, his brother Ipuy, his mother Nofretkau and others are shown worshipping Re-Harakhti, Ptah-Sokar, Hathor, and Amenhotep I and his mother Queen Ahmose Nefertari.

On the entrance there are balancing scenes on the outer jambs. On one side Raweben and his family are mentioned in a hetep di nesu offering, while his brother Ipuy and his family are mentioned on the other side.

== Other objects ==
A limestone stela of Qenemkhopshef was discovered, begotten by Raweben as an offering to Re-Harakhty. The stela gives evidence of textual prayer on behalf of Raweben to Re-Harakhty. On the theme of limestone, there was also a limestone offering table of Raweben which can also be referred to as Rauben in academic settings. The offering table of Raweben had dedications to Amenhotep I and Ahmose Nefertari. There was also an architrave fragment, which is a beam that rests atop columns on the captials, which is now housed in the Turin Museum.

== See also ==
- List of Theban tombs
