= Khawy =

Ancient Egyptian guardian in Deir el-Medina

- Guardian in the Place of Truth
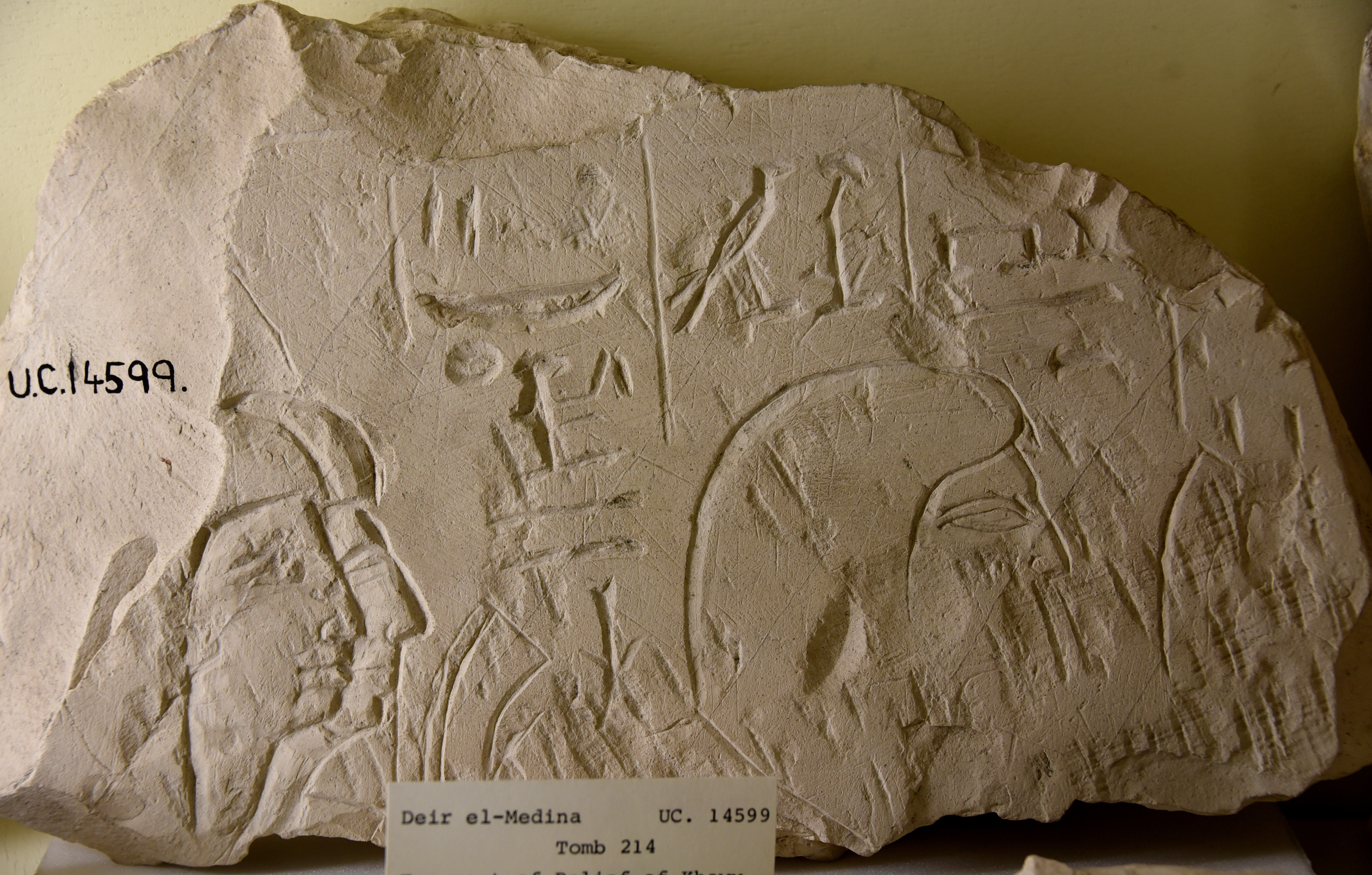
- Fragment of relief of Khawy
Egyptian name
M12 A w Z4 W3 N5
- Dynasty: 19th Dynasty
- Pharaoh: Ramesses II
- Burial: TT214
- Spouse: Taweret
- Children: Huy

Khawy was a guardian in the Place of Truth and servitor of Amun of Opet (Luxor) from the reign of Ramesses II. He lived in the workers village Deir el-Medina (House NE XV). Khawy is known from his tomb TT214, his house and several other inscriptions.

== Monuments and inscriptions ==
- Khawy was buried in Tomb TT214 which is located in Deir el-Medina near Luxor. The tomb consists of a courtyard, a chapel and a set of underground rooms, one of which served as the burial chamber.
- A door frame which is now in the museum in Turin (N. 50207 and 50211) in Italy is inscribed with hetep di nesu texts (king's offerings) to Amen-Re and Khons.
- A table of offerings now in the Sheurleer Museum in The Hague, the Netherlands. The text consists of hetep di nesu offerings to Re-Harakhti-Atum and Osiris.
- A stela with the Vizier Paser which is now in the Egyptian Museum in Cairo (JdE 72021) shows Paser and Ramesses II adoring Hathor, while Khawy is depicted in a lower register.
- A stela depicting a solar barque with Amun seated in a solar disc shows Khawy and his wife Taweret kneeling and adoring the gods.
- A fragment of a stela shows Khawy adoring Amun-Re-Atum
- A jamb and stone fragments from Khawy's house in Deir el-Medina record his name.
- A shabti box of Khawy was found at his tomb.
- Graffiti in Western Thebes mentions Khawy. His titles range from Guardian of the Place of Truth, Guardian of the Place of Eternity, Guardian of the Lord of the Two Lands, to Servant in the Place of Truth.
