= TT6 =

Ancient Egyptian tomb

Coordinates: 25.7333°N 32.6000°E

Theban tomb TT6
- Burial site of Nebnefer and Neferhotep
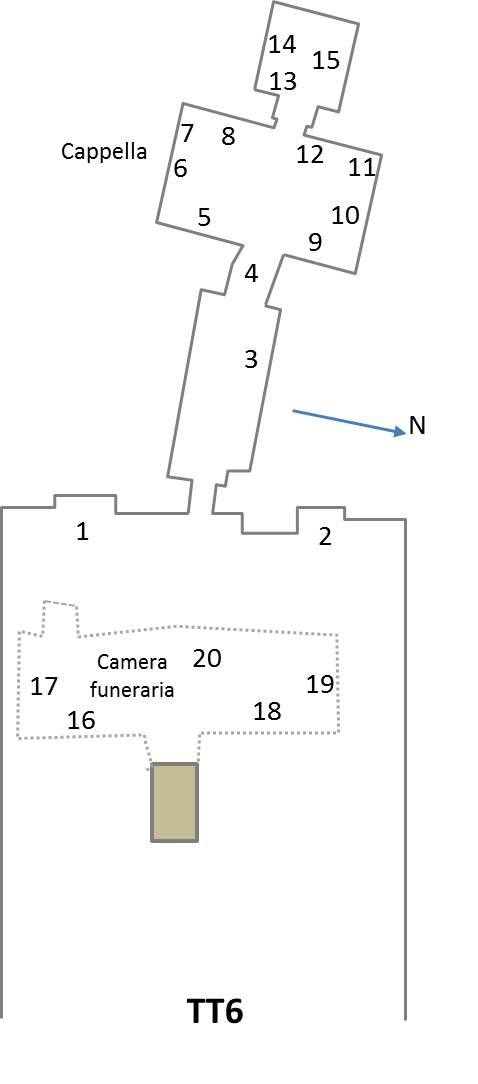
- Location: Deir el-Medina, Theban Necropolis
- ← Previous; TT5 Next → TT7

nb F35 f r and F35 f r Y1 t p
Nebnefer and Neferhotep
in hieroglyphs
Era: New Kingdom
(1550–1069 BC)

The Theban Tomb TT6 is located in Deir el-Medina, part of the Theban Necropolis, on the west bank of the Nile, opposite to Luxor. It is the burial place of the ancient Egyptian artisans named Neferhotep and Nebnefer (father and son respectively), who lived during the end of the 18th and beginning of the 19th Dynasty.

Neferhotep the Younger, son of Nebnefer and grandson of Neferhotep is buried in TT216.

== Tomb ==
In the passage into the tomb both Nebnefer and Neferhotep are mentioned. Neferhotep is called Chief Workman in the Place of Truth.

In the chapel the right side shows the son nebnefer. He is depicted with his wife Iyi before a goddess. In another scene nebnefer, his wife Iyi and her mother Ese receive offerings, while nearby nebnefer and Iyi are shown playing a game. In the scene where Nebnefer and his wife adore Re-Harakhti, he is specifically said to be the son of the dignitary of the Western Side, Chief workman of the Place of Truth, Neferhotep.

The left side of the chapel shows scenes with Neferhotep and his wife Iyemwaw. The couple appear with several children. Their son Nakhy is an army scribe and chariot warrior of His Majesty, Mose is a transport officer of His Majesty, horse groom and Porter of the temple of Usermaatre Setepenre. A daughter Tuya also appears before her parents. The ceiling has two parallel inscriptions. One for Nebnefer and his wife, the other for Neferhotep and his wife.

A shrine contains more scenes. Neferhotep and nebnefer are shown with relatives before Khnum, Anuqet and Satis in one scene, while they appear before Anuqet and the Horus falcon in another. The tomb was fully published in 2022.

== See also ==
- List of Theban tombs
