= TT212 =

Theban tomb

Theban tomb TT212
- Burial site of Ramose
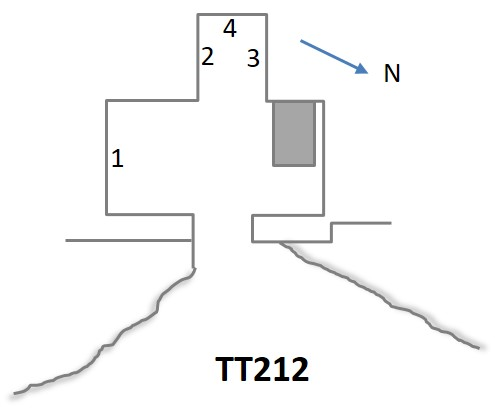

- Location within Egypt
- Location: Deir el-Medina, Theban Necropolis
- ← Previous; TT211 Next → TT213

r a N5 Z1 ms s
Ramose
in hieroglyphs
Era: New Kingdom
(1550–1069 BC)

The Theban Tomb TT212 is located in Deir el-Medina, part of the Theban Necropolis, on the west bank of the Nile, opposite to Luxor.

TT212 is a chapel of the ancient Egyptian scribe in the Place of Truth named Ramose, who lived during the 19th Dynasty. Ramose would have lived in Deir el-Medina during the reign of Ramesses II. TT212 is one of three tombs attributed to Ramose. TT7 and TT250 also belonged to him. This tomb is the smallest of the three.

Ramose was the son of Amenemhab and Kakaia. His wife was named Mutemwia.

== Tomb ==
TT212 only consists of a chapel and a shrine. The chapel contains (damaged) agricultural scenes. The shrine at the back of the chapel shows Ramose making offerings before Harsiese and Thoth. and Ramose and his wife Mutemwia before Osiris and Isis. The back wall contains a hymn to Re while the goddess Nut holds the horizon disk in her arms in mountain. Other gods shown in the scenes include Ptah in a shrine, Maat before Re-Harakhti and a statue of the Hathor-cow. The ceiling is decorated with scenes depicting Ramose seated under a fig tree by a pool and in another scene adoring Re-Harakhti.

== See also ==
- List of Theban tombs
