= TT216 =

Theban tomb

Coordinates: 25.7333°N 32.6000°E

Theban tomb TT216
- Burial site of Neferhotep
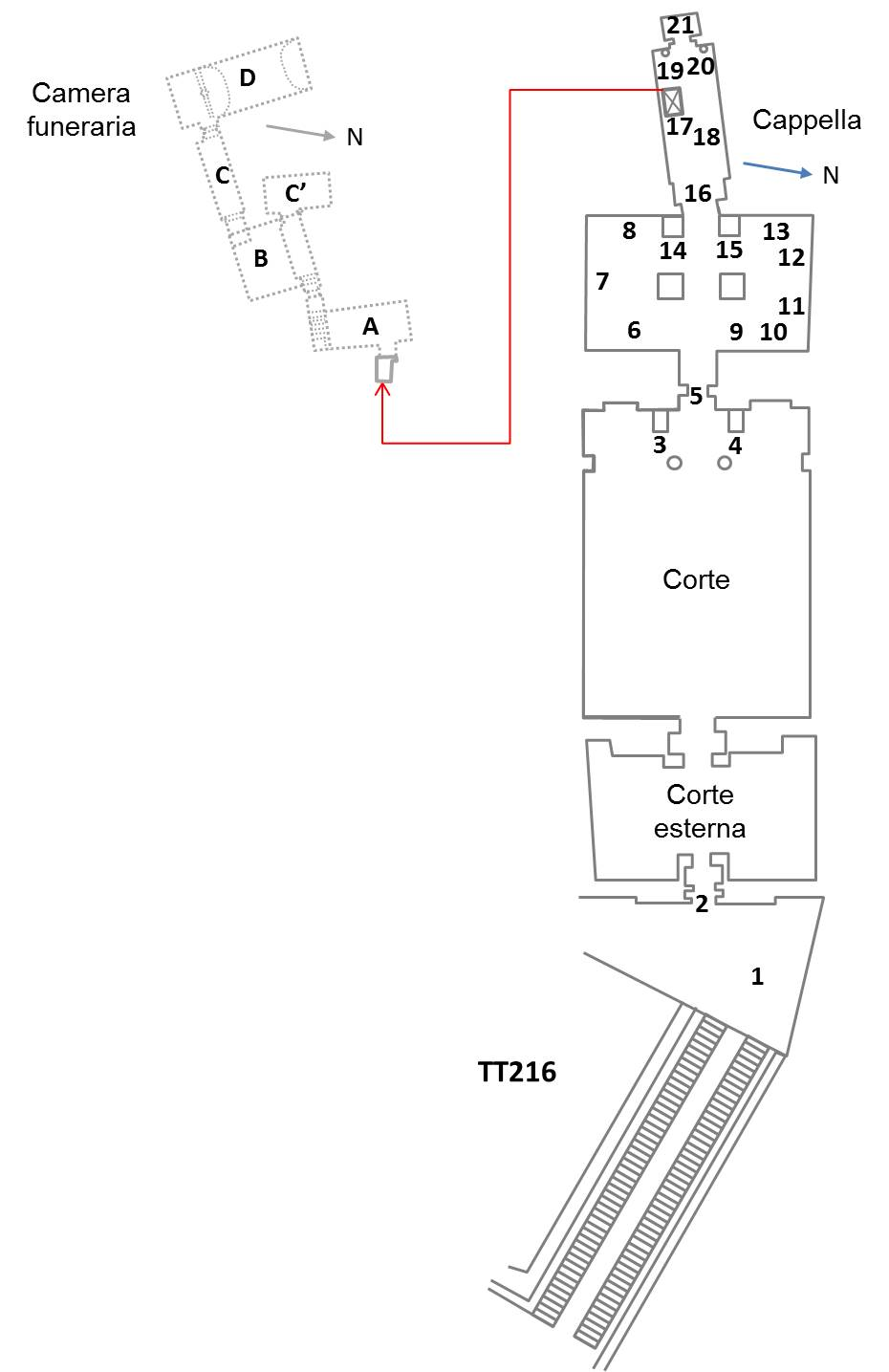

- Location within Egypt
- Location: Deir el-Medina, Theban Necropolis
- ← Previous; TT215 Next → TT217

F35 f r Y1 t p
Neferhotep
in hieroglyphs
Era: New Kingdom
(1550–1069 BC)

The Theban Tomb TT216 is located in Deir el-Medina, part of the Theban Necropolis, on the west bank of the Nile, opposite to Luxor. It is the burial place of the ancient Egyptian artisan named Neferhotep, who lived during the 19th Dynasty. Neferhotep would have lived in Deir el-Medina during the reigns of Ramesses II, Merenptah and Sethi II.

Neferhotep the Younger, was the son of Nebnufer and grandson of Neferhotep (who were buried in TT6). His wife was named Webekht.

== Tomb ==
In the outer chapel Neferhotep is depicted with his wife Webkhet, his father Nebnufer, his mother Iyi and his maternal grandmother Ese. In another scene people are shown before pharaoh Ramesses II.

The inner chapel includes scenes showing a funeral procession attended by Neferhotep's brothers Anuy, Pashed and Nebnufer as well as several servants. There are two statue groups. Each depicts Neferhotep and his wife Webkhet.

== See also ==
- List of Theban tombs
