= Mortuary temple of Thutmose I =

Ancient Egyptian temple located at El-Khokha in the Theban Necropolis

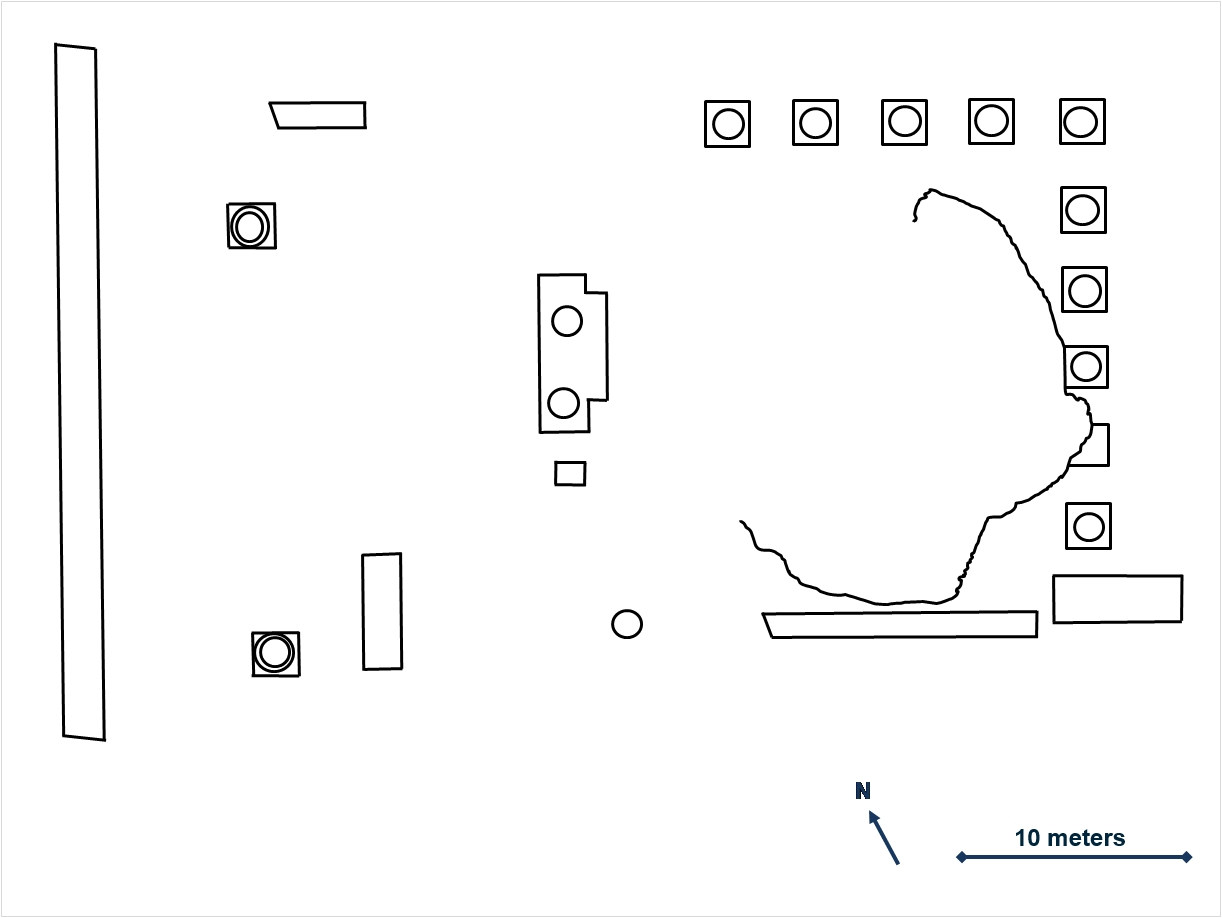
- Floor plan of the temple

- Location within Egypt
- 25.730278°N 32.615278°E
- Type: Mortuary temple
- Periods: Eighteenth Dynasty of Egypt
- Cultures: Ancient Egypt
- Location: El-Khokha, Egypt
- Part of: Theban Necropolis

History
- Built: 15th century BC
- Built by: Hatshepsut

Site notes
- Excavation dates: 1970-1978
- Archaeologists: Abu el-Ayun Barakat
- Discovered: 1970

The mortuary temple of Thutmose I was an Ancient Egyptian temple located at El-Khokha in the Theban Necropolis. It was the mortuary temple of the pharaoh Thutmose I, probably constructed by his daughter Hatshepsut. The monument is now completely destroyed; only the base of a column remains.

== Description ==
W9 X1 S34
H̱nmt ˁnḫ (Khenemet-ânkh)
"The one which is united with life"
in hieroglyphs
Era: New Kingdom
(1550–1069 BC)

The mortuary temple of Thutmose I was an Ancient Egyptian temple built in the Theban Necropolis, on the west bank of the Nile, across from the ancient city of Thebes (modern Luxor). The building was erected in the same area of the necropolis as the other mortuary temples of the New Kingdom, along the processional way of the Beautiful Festival of the Valley. It was located at El-Khokha, between the mortuary temple of Ramesses IV and that of Thutmose III.

The temple was constructed with blocks of limestone extracted from a local quarry and sandstone probably originating from Gebel el-Silsila. The latter, being more resistant, was probably used mainly for the temple's supporting elements, while limestone was employed for the interior structures. Due to the temple's extremely poor state of preservation (as it was located in a flood-prone area), it is difficult to reconstruct its original layout with precision. The only certainty is the existence of a hypostyle hall composed of columns 1.50 metres in diameter and spaced 2.50 metres apart, a standard arrangement in temples built by Hatshepsut. Outside, the temple was surrounded by a two-metre-thick wall of mudbrick.

Despite the destruction of the temple, a very large number of fragments have been recovered, allowing scholars to learn more about the monument. One of the temple's peculiarities is the very poor quality of part of its decoration. Some blocks show that certain walls were painted directly onto the raw stone surface without any preparatory whitening stage. In addition, some inscriptions and illustrations were only painted onto the stone rather than carved in relief, as would normally be expected in such a monument. Another unusual feature of the decoration is the presence of chariot battle scenes, a type of representation common during the New Kingdom but still extremely rare at this early period. The temple also contains the earliest known representation of a religious festival calendar on an external temple wall during the New Kingdom.

== History ==
=== Construction and activity ===
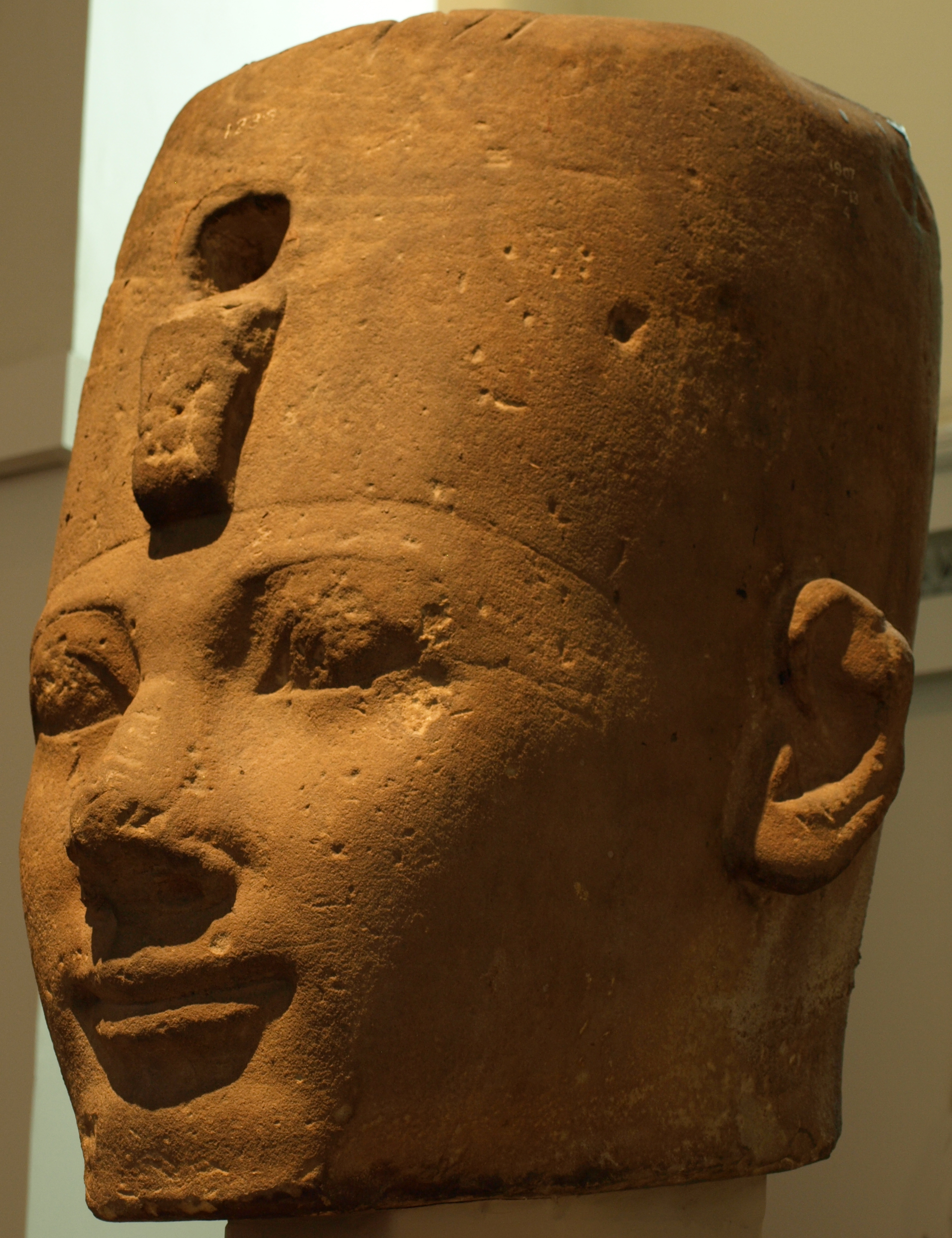
Thutmose I

The temple of millions of years of the pharaoh Thutmose I was a mortuary temple constructed in order to maintain the king's cult after his death and ensure the immortality of his soul. It is unclear whether construction of the temple began during this king's reign. Ineni, the architect of Thutmose I, does not mention the monument in the list of temples he built for the king. In any case, it was certainly his daughter, the queen-pharaoh Hatshepsut, who completed the construction of the building, as her name appears extensively in the temple inscriptions. The poor quality of the building's decoration suggests that it was erected hastily.

The earliest attestation of the temple's existence and activity outside the monument itself dates to the reign of Thutmose III, Hatshepsut's successor. After the queen's death, he replaced her cartouches with those of Thutmose II. The temple was damaged during the Amarna Period, when the name of the god Amun was erased, and may also have been partially dismantled. The history of the temple during this period is difficult to reconstruct because not all divine representations were hammered out on the temple walls, suggesting that at least part of the temple had already been abandoned by that time. The building was later restored and remained in use at least until the Ramesside Period. The latest mention of the temple dates to the reign of Ptolemy VI Philometor.

The temple was eventually abandoned and used as a quarry, notably for the manufacture of stone bowls, many unfinished examples of which have been found on the site.

=== Discovery ===
In 1970, a group of Egyptian workers installing a pump at a public well in order to supply water to the Polish archaeological mission at Deir el-Bahari discovered the base of an ancient column. The Egyptian archaeologist sent to the site by the Supreme Council of Antiquities, Abu el-Ayun Barakat, identified the remains as those of a temple dating to Hatshepsut's reign. Barakat went further and identified the site as Kha-Akhet, a temple whose location was still unknown at the time but which was well attested in archaeological sources. According to several hieroglyphic inscriptions found on monuments at Thebes, Kha-Akhet was a temple erected by Hatshepsut near Deir el-Bahari and the mortuary temple of Thutmose III at El-Khokha. Since the ruins excavated by Barakat were geographically located between these two sites, he identified the site as the temple of Kha-Akhet. This identification nevertheless remains controversial among scholars.

During Barakat's excavations (1970-1978), thousands of stone block fragments originating from the temple were discovered and stored in the Theban tomb MMA 828, which was used as a storage area. A Polish team led by Zbigniew Szafranski, working at the mortuary temple of Hatshepsut at Deir el-Bahari, visited the tomb several times in order to determine whether blocks from Hatshepsut's temple were present there. In doing so, they drew nearly five thousand fragments and photographed almost seven thousand five hundred of them.

In the 2000s, the discovery of the temple of Kha-Akhet at the Ramesseum definitively ruled out the identification proposed by Abu el-Ayun Barakat. In autumn 2009, the discovery of the name of the mortuary temple of Thutmose I (Khenemet-ankh) on several blocks found by Barakat and stored in tomb MMA 828 enabled Polish archaeologists to identify the ruins at El-Khokha as the mortuary temple of Thutmose I.

== Bibliography ==
- Barakat, Abu El-Ayun (1981). "The Temple of Kha'-'Akhet in Western Thebes". Mitteilungen des Deutschen Archäologischen Instituts Kairo. 37: 29–33.
- Iwaszczuk, Jadwiga (2011). "Unique Temple of Thutmose I". Annual Reports. Polish Academy of Sciences: 22–25.
- Iwaszczuk, Jadwiga (2012). "The Temple of Thutmosis I Rediscovered". Polish Archaeology in the Mediterranean. 21: 269–278. ISBN 9788323511441.
- Ćwiek, Andrzej (2014). "Old and Middle Kingdom Tradition in the Temple of Hatshepsut at Deir el-Bahari". Etudes et Travaux. Vol. XXVII. Warsaw: Iksio Pan. pp. 61–93. ISBN 9788392231981.
- Ullmann, Martina (2015). "The Temples of Millions of Years at Western Thebes". In Wilkinson, Richard; Weeks, Kent R. (eds.). The Oxford Handbook of the Valley of the Kings. Oxford: Oxford University Press. pp. 417–432. doi:10.1093/oxfordhb/9780199931637.013.45. ISBN 9780199931637.
- Zdziebłowski, Szymon (June 28, 2017). "Polish Egyptologist identified fragments of a lost Egyptian temple... in a storage". Science in Poland. Archived from the original on May 22, 2023.
- Iwaszczuk, Jadwiga (2017). Sacred Landscape of Thebes During the Reign of Hatshepsut: Royal Construction Projects, Volume I: Topography of the West Bank (PDF). Warsaw: Iksio Pan. ISBN 9788394758233.
- Iwaszczuk, Jadwiga (2021). "Battle scenes from the temple of Thutmose I in Qurna". Egypt and the Levant. 31: 147–162.
