= TT47 =

Theban tomb

Coordinates: 25.7333°N 32.6000°E

Theban tomb TT47
- Burial site of Userhat
- Location within Egypt
- Location: El-Khokha, Theban Necropolis
- ← Previous; TT46 Next → TT48

F12 s r D40 F4 t Z1
Userhat
in hieroglyphs
Era: New Kingdom
(1550–1069 BC)

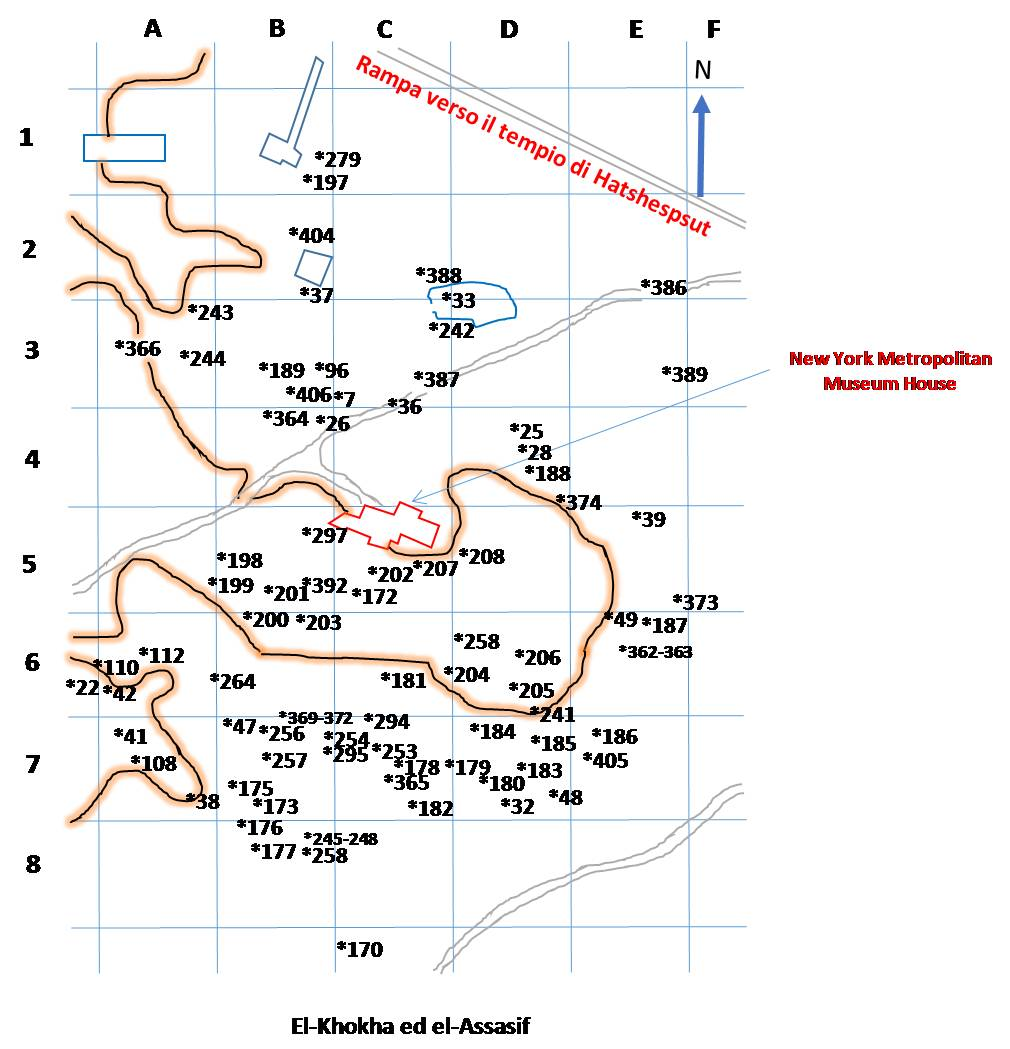

The Theban Tomb TT47 is located in El-Khokha, part of the Theban Necropolis, on the west bank of the Nile, opposite to Luxor.

TT47 was the burial place of the ancient Egyptian named Userhat, who was an Overseer of the royal harem. Userhat dates to the time of Amenhotep III from the middle of the Eighteenth Dynasty of Egypt. Userhat was the son of the judge Neh and his wife Senenu. Userhat's wife was named Maiay.

A Japanese expedition started to work in the tomb in 2007. The tomb chapel is cut into the rocks. There is a courtyard and west of it are two halls with pillars and columns. The wall of the halls are decorated with reliefs. One shows queen Tiye, wife of king Amenhotep III. This relief was already in at the beginning of the 20th century cut out of the wall and sold to the Cinquantenaire Museum in Brussels.

== See also ==
- List of Theban tombs
