= TT374 =

Egyptian tomb

Theban tomb TT374
- Burial site of Amenemope
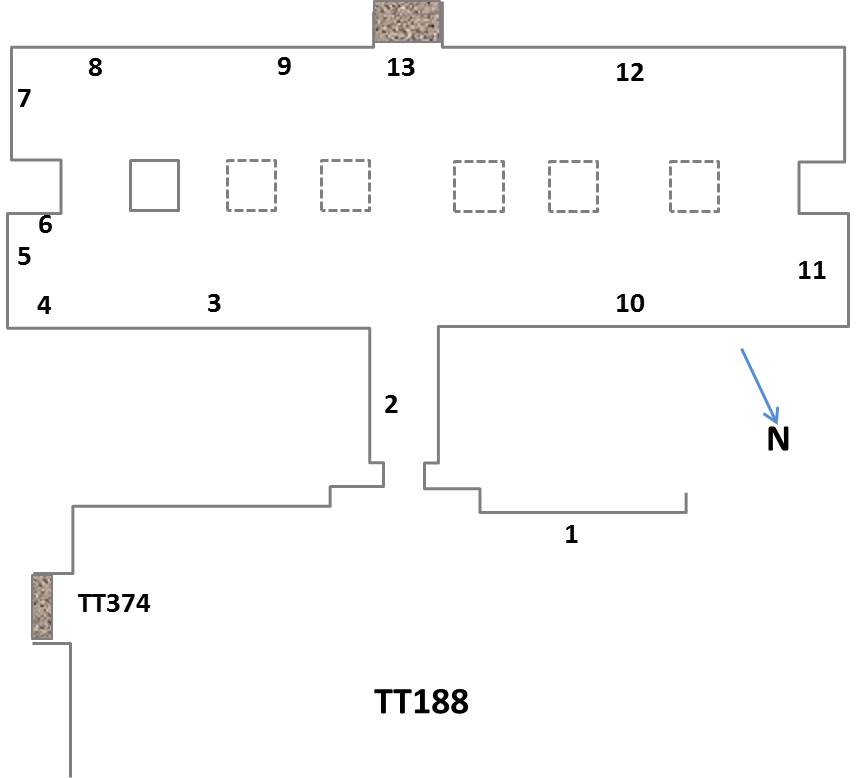
- TT374 in the courtyard of TT188

- Location within Egypt
- Location: El-Khokha, Theban Necropolis
- ← Previous; TT373 Next → TT375

Tomb TT374, located in the necropolis of El-Khokha in Thebes, Egypt, is the tomb of the Scribe of the Treasury of the Ramesseum, Amenemope.

The tomb was dug into the side of the courtyard of TT188, the tomb of Parennefer. The deceased is shown before Osiris and Ra. Porter and Moss identify the god as Re-Harakhti.

== See also ==
- List of Theban tombs
