= TT176 =

Theban omb

Theban tomb TT176
- Burial site of Userhat
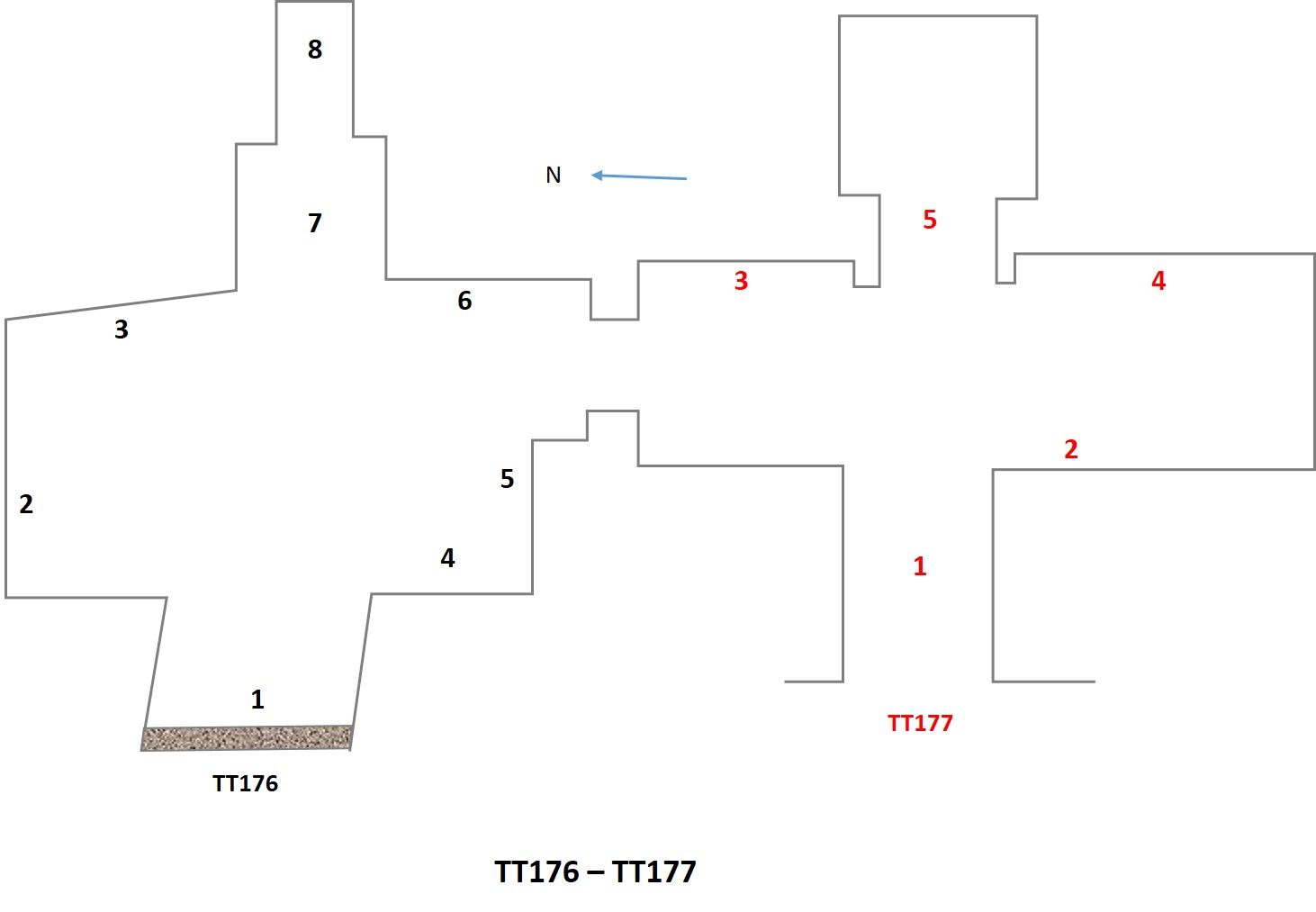
- Location: El-Khokha, Theban Necropolis
- ← Previous; TT175 Next → TT177

wsr HAt t Z1
Userhat
in hieroglyphs
Era: New Kingdom
(1550–1069 BC)

The Theban Tomb TT176 is located in El-Khokha, part of the Theban Necropolis, on the west bank of the Nile, opposite to Luxor.

TT176 was the burial place of the Ancient Egyptian official named Userhat, who was a servant of Amun, clean of hands. He lived in the 18th Dynasty under the reign of Amenhotep II and Thutmose IV.

His tomb chapel is very small and today much destroyed. The decoration of the chapel is painted. At the very back there is a decorated niche with an unfinished painted decoration. Between 1920 and 1930, the German scholar Siegfried Schott took some photographs and Davies copied some tomb scenes. In 1994 and 1995 the tomb was fully recorded by Bram Calcoen, who published the results of her work together with Christiane Müller-Hazenbos.

Scenes in the tomb include depictions of the travel to Abydos, a banquet scene, rituals in front of Userhat, Userhat in front of offering tables and fragments of a harvest scene.

== See also ==
- List of Theban tombs
