= Puimre =

Ancient Egyptian priest

Q3 G43 M17 G17 N5 Z1
Pwj m Rˁ
Puimre
in hieroglyphs
Era: New Kingdom
(1550–1069 BC)

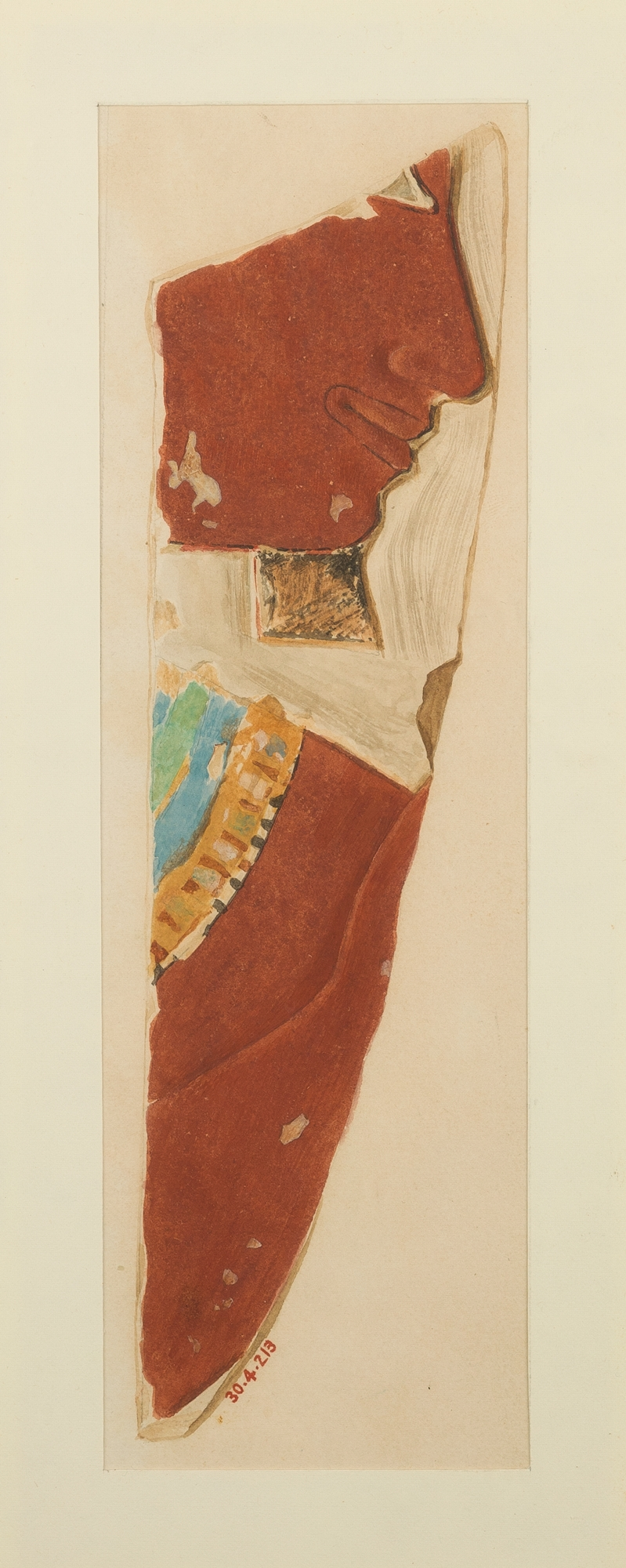
Face of Puyemre, Tomb of Puyemre

Puimre, also spelled Puyemrê, was an ancient Egyptian noble, architect and Second Priest of Amun during the reign of Thutmose III of the 18th Dynasty of Egypt. He was the son of Puia and Lady Nefer-iah, and had two wives: Tanefert and Sensonb. His wife Sensonb was the daughter of Puimre's superior, the High Priest of Amun Hapuseneb and his wife Amenhotep. Sensonb served in the temple of Amun as a Divine Adoratrice.

Puimre's tomb – namely TT39 – is located in El-Khokha, part of the Theban Necropolis, on the west bank of the Nile, opposite to Luxor. A damaged relief from the tomb contains an image of a cat and its name, "Nedjem", the earliest known individual cat name.
