= TT184 =

Theban tomb

Theban tomb TT184
- Burial site of Nefermenu
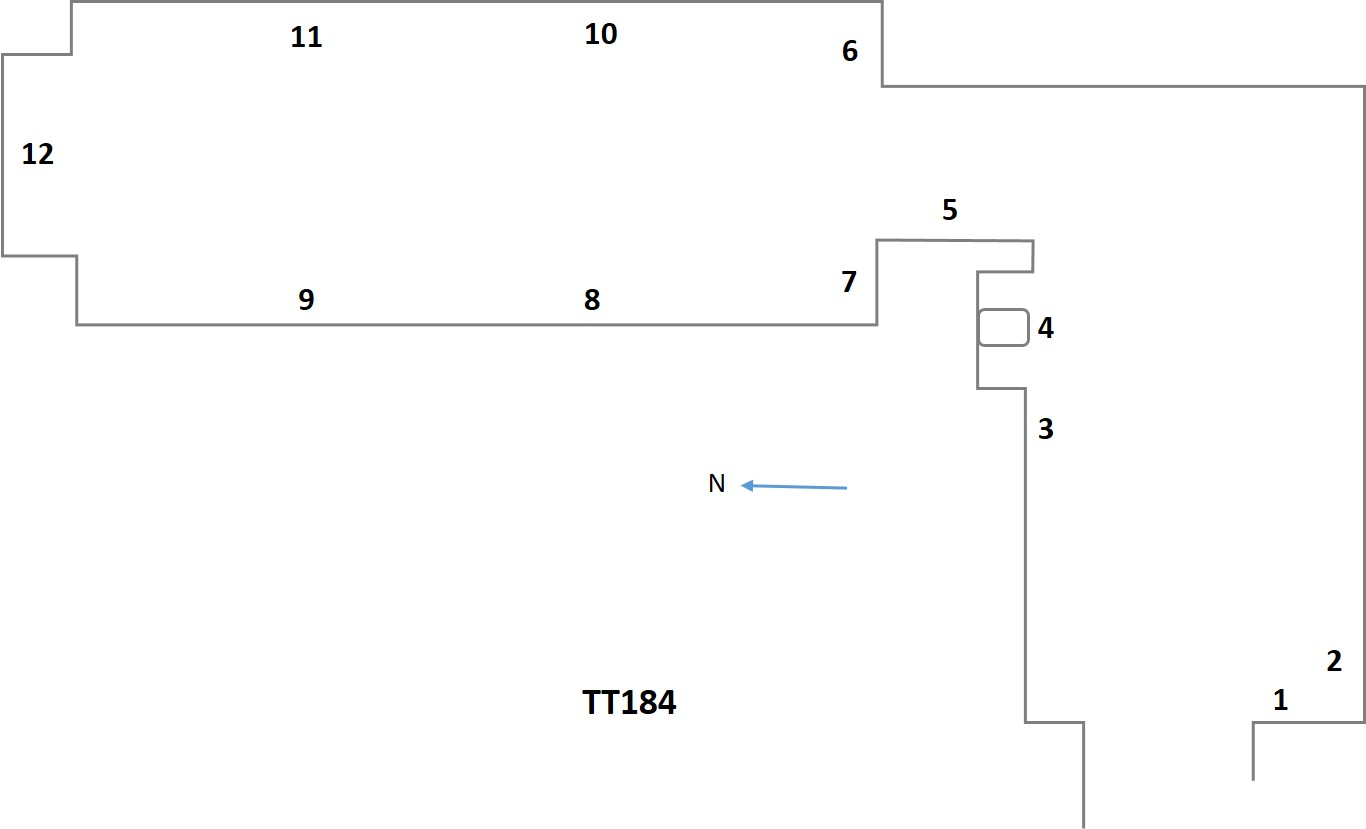

- Location within Egypt
- Location: El-Khokha, Theban Necropolis
- Excavated by: Zoltán Imre Fábián; Hungarian Archaeological Mission
- ← Previous; TT183 Next → TT185

nfr mn n W24 W24 W24
Nefermenu
in hieroglyphs
Era: New Kingdom
(1550–1069 BC)

The Theban tomb TT184 is the burial place of Nefermenu, an ancient Egyptian official, Mayor of Thebes and Royal Scribe during the reign of Ramesses II. The tomb is part of the Theban Necropolis and located on the El-Khokha hillock on the west bank of the Nile, opposite to Luxor.

== The owner ==
Nefermenu's most commonly used titles are those of royal scribe and mayor, but he also held the following titles: overseer of the granaries of Amun, steward of Amun, overseer of the granaries of all the gods of Upper and Lower Egypt, steward of the (mortuary) temple of Amenhotep I in Thebes, overseer of the house of silver and gold, chief taxing master of the lord of the Two Lands, and feast leader of all the gods in Thebes.

Nefermenu's wife Mery(nebu) is depicted in the tomb. She was a songstress of Amun like many other high ranking noble ladies.

== The tomb ==
Fieldwork on TT184 started in 1995. The excavations were conducted by the Hungarian Archaeological Mission under the direction of Zoltán Fábián.

The hall of the tomb shows the name of Nefermenu and the walls show scenes from the Book of the Dead, spell 145. Nefermenu is shown with his wife while they receive offerings. A niche in the hall contains a statue. The inner room shows several scenes of Nefermenu in the presence of gods including Horus, Osiris, the goddess of the West and Thoth.

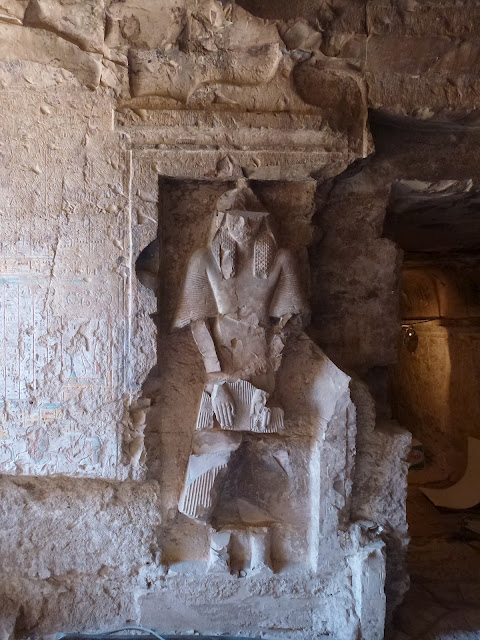
Statue of Nefermenu

== See also ==
- List of Theban tombs
