= TT39 =

Theban tomb

Coordinates: 25.7336°N 32.6134°E

Theban tomb TT39
- Burial site of Puimre
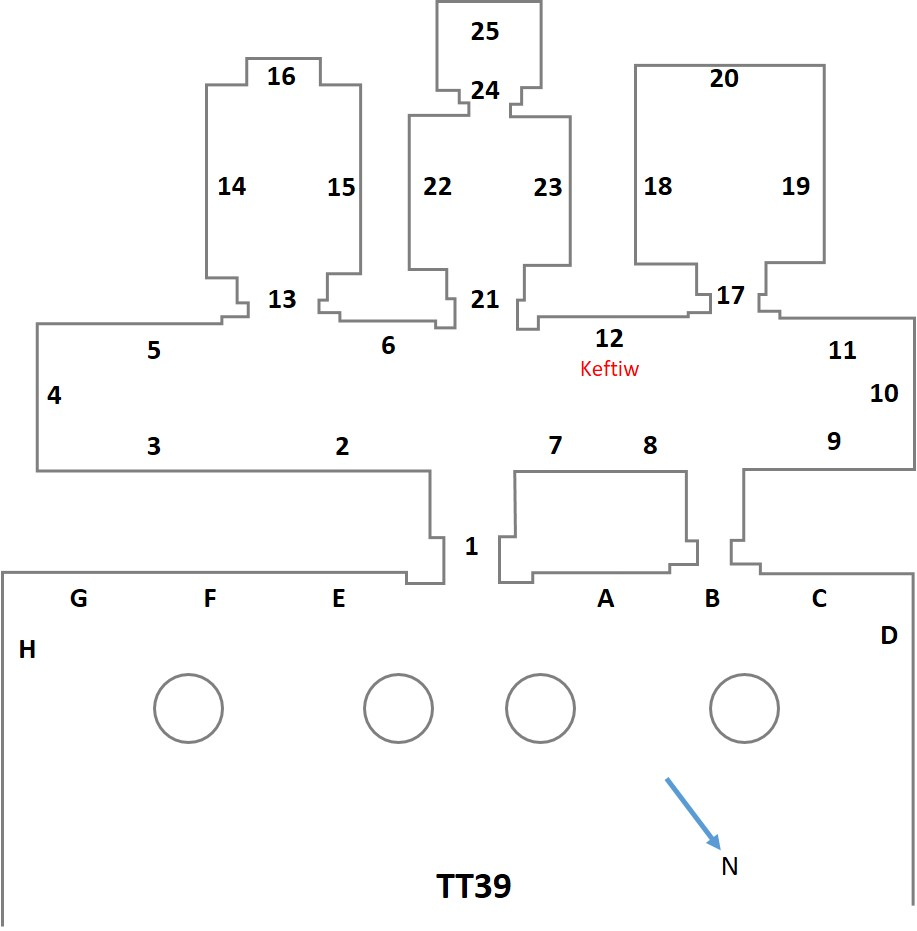
- Floor plan of TT39

- Location within Egypt
- Location: El-Khokha, Theban Necropolis
- Discovered: 18th Dynasty
- ← Previous; TT38 Next → TT40

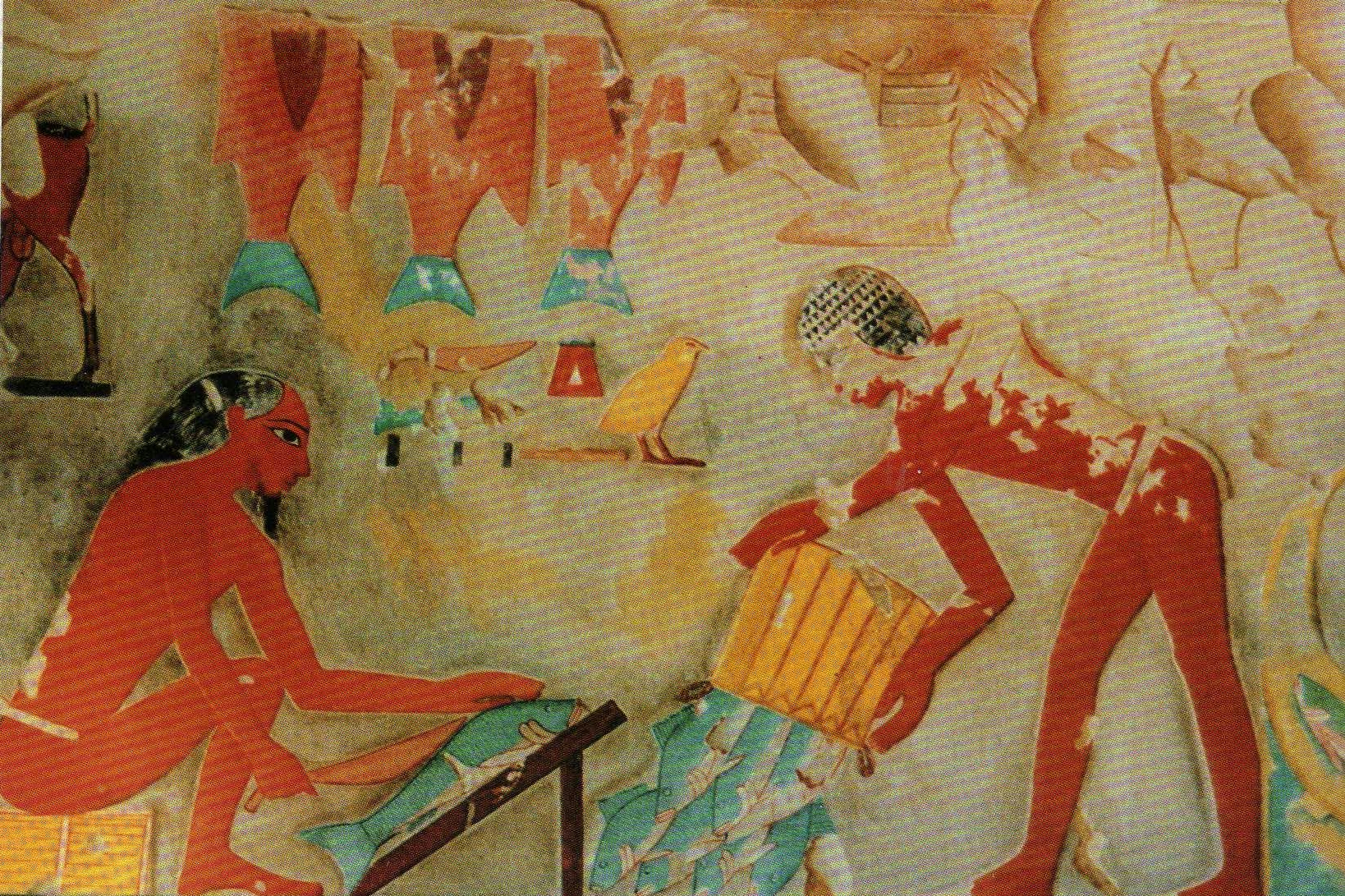
Relief from TT39 depicting the fish gutting

The Theban Tomb TT39 is located in El-Khokha, part of the Theban Necropolis, on the west bank of the Nile, opposite to Luxor. It is the burial place of the ancient Egyptian official, Puimre (or Puyemre).

== Tomb ==
The portico of the tomb contains eight stelae, six of which contain autobiographical texts. The hallway is decorated with scenes depicting gardens, workshops of the temple of Amun and agricultural scenes. Further scenes in the hall include a banquet and the recording of produce from Nubia for the treasury of Amun. A son offers a bouquet to Puiemre and his wife Senseneb, while in another scene Puiemre is accompanied by his wife Tanefert while inspecting produce. In yet another scene Puiemre and Senseneb are shown inspecting other items including geese, fish, etc.

In the south chapel sons and daughters are shown offering new year gifts with his wife Senseneb depicted on one wall and his wife Tanefert depicted on the other. The north chapel contains funeral scenes and further funeral scenes. The central chapel includes scenes showing a son before Puiemre. Priestesses of Hathor are shown offering menats and emblems of the goddess to Puimre.

=== Tomb of Puyemré ===
The tomb of Puyemré dates back to the New Kingdom during the time of Reign of Thutmosis III. Puyemré's parents were Puia and Nerferioh and he had two wives named Tanefert and Senseneb, he was the second prophet of Amūn. In his earlier career Puyemré as second priest of Amon had been responsible for Queen Hatshepsut for the construction of the outworks of her temple. Puyemré was given the name of “Baumeister des Hatschepsuttempels von Deir el-Bahari” by B. Engelmann von Carnap because of the responsibility he had for Queen Hatshepsut. The tomb of Puyemré is a private tomb located in Khokha. It was excavated in the rock in the great cemetery in the western bank of the Nile at Thebes. The current location of the tomb of Pyuemré is now at the museum under the Tytus Fund. The architecture of this tomb with its columned portico and transverse hall leading to three chapels is unique compared to typical T-shaped tombs of the Eighteenth Dynasty. The portico has been reconstructed due to being old which was a common thing in all tombs that reconstruction would happen. The portico the roof being supported by columns that have texts of deceased in the intercolumnar there remained scenes including banquet and deceased by two priest. The three chapels: south chapel, north chapel and the central chapel are all filled with decorations that capture different scenes. The south chapel has sons and daughters with new year gifts before deceased and wife Sensonb on the left and Tanefer on the right wall. Puyemré wives must have been very important to him because they are almost in every wall pictured doing something different. In the north chapel there are funeral scenes on each side of the doorway as well as offering lists to Nefertem before being deceased. Finally, in the central chapel there are two scenes of Hathor that emblems to deceased. Before the men are deceased there are oils on burnt offerings and the priest with offerings is deceased with his wife.

The façade was not only the form of decoration that TT39 courtyard had but also has false doors at slight intervals and rounded tablets but also its execution the backward lean and the incised inscription in monochrome. The proposed shelter was taken into consideration the quality of the rock at the level that it was being 4.5 meters above the floor of the false doors could not be cut into. So there was an alternative way or reconstruction including flat stones twelve to fifteen centimeters thick to provide support. The hall way that leads to the three chapels show scenes with inspects workshops of the temple of Amūn and ploughing in carpenters, jewelers, stone-vase workers, ploughing, and attendants with horses and chariot (Porter 71). There is guest and female musicians included and women with lyre; this records the produce of south lands before the deceased for Treasury of Amūn, including Nubians with cattle, gold and ivory, monkeys and baboons, and Egyptians with linen.

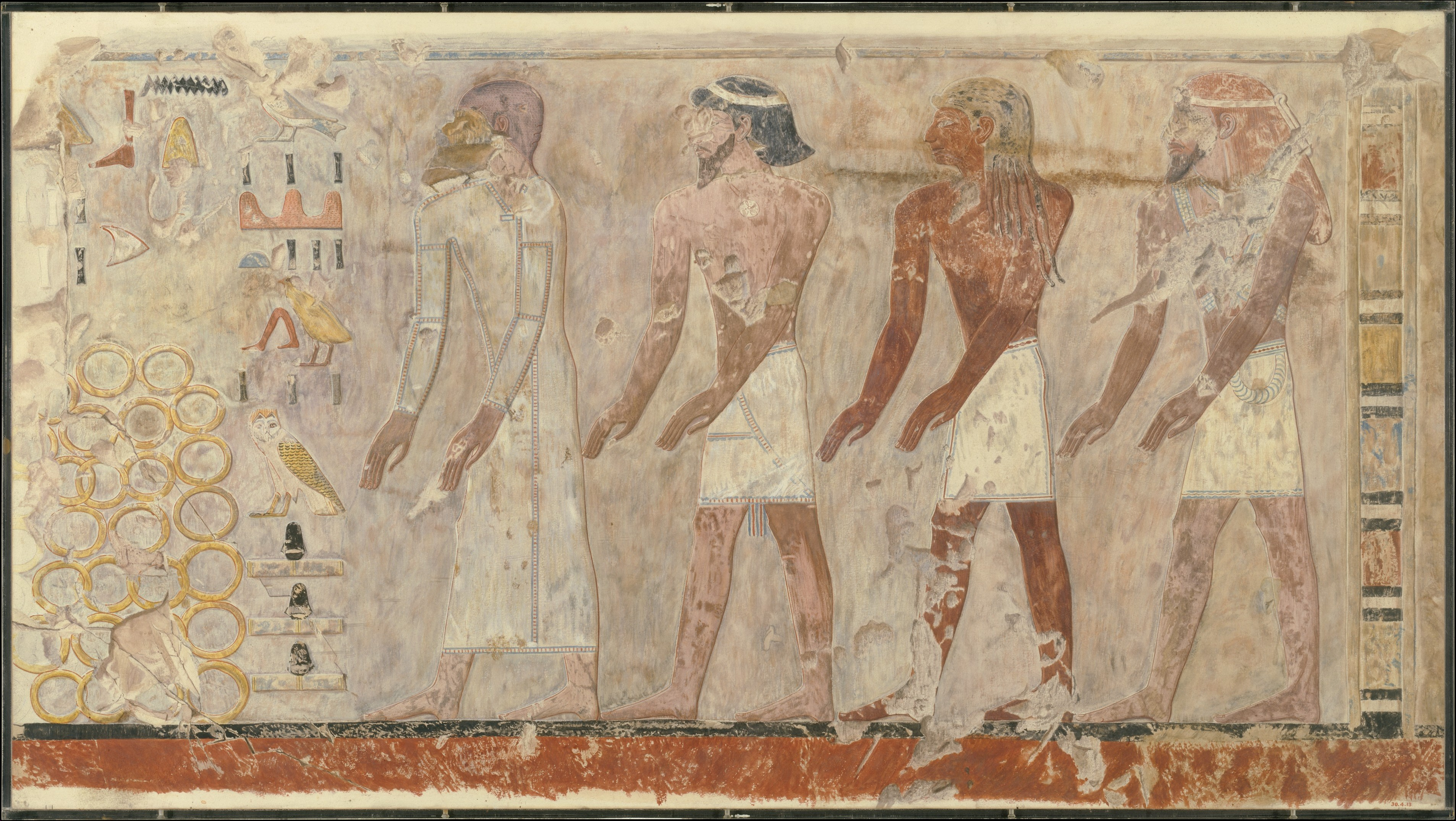
"Four Foreign Chieftains" from TT39 (Metropolitan Museum of Art, MET DT10871). The second from the right is a Keftiu.

In TT39, the only repast scenes incorporating an offering procession were shown in the southern chapel (Stupko-Lubczyńska 656). Where the scene corresponds with the selection of gifts presented to the deceased. This scene is being questioned because it's found in TT81 (Ineni) in the corresponding wall, TT71 (Nebamon) and in TT100 (Rekmire). This scene was a popular decoration to have in the Eighteenth Dynasty. What links the scene in TT 39 and that in the Chapel of Hatshepsut, apart from the presented product, are the titles of the bearers. All of them in TT 39 are described as Hrj mr(w)t, ‘an overseer of mr(w)t-people’. Seven of fifteen men in the Chapel of Hatshepsut are entitled sS Hrj mr(w)t, ‘a scribe (of) an overseer of mr(w)t-people’, while the figures with this title tend to concentrate in the end of the register. N. de G Davies gives an example referenced to the Hatshepsut chapel where there's scenes that are placed in the chapel of Hatshepsut in TT39. The chapel of Hatshepsut is seen as a significance to TT39 for inspiration and decoration the scenes the non offering list, the motifs of incense, linen, and animals incorporated into the offering procession and the figures of Iunmutef and Thot, placed in the Chapel itself are interesting when compared to the typical Old and Middle Kingdom of Egypt offering scenes. Where the offering scenes served as a symbolic and as well as a magical purpose. Inside the tomb there are thirty-one plates that consist of photogravures, line drawings and twelve color plates.

Puyemré had reserved his tomb for his family including his two wives. This shows that Puyemré did not follow the old custom of assigning names and offices to all but the very humblest servitors (Davies, N. de Garis 38). There is a repetition in scenes that show Puyemré and his two wives where Tanefret is his companion on the north wall and Senseneb on the south wall. This shows the two rivals coming together for the affection or the affectionate memory of Puyemré showing a lack of domestic harmony. It turns out that this scene is the most appealing to visitors when they visit the tomb. These scenes are back to back coming together in the center of the niche in plate sixty-two. There are three scenes that show deceased Tanefert with monkeys eating dates under her chair and deceased spearing hippopotamus as well as deceased families that are fishing. The other scene where Senseneb is deceased where she is standing inspecting three rows bringing geese, ducks, and cranes, netting fowl herdsmen bringing cattle and brining netting fish, the third where there's vintage with sealing wine-jars, pressing and treading grape, and papyrus-harvest. These scenes based on Puyemré's wives seem to be most important because it seemed that both of them had a hard work life for Puyemré they were both worked down doing all these activities/jobs.

Plate LXIV: Presentation of animals as an element of the offering procession in the chapel of Hatshepsut

Plate LXII South chapel plan and drawing of the niche in the back wall: The dead man and his wives at meat

== See also ==
- List of Theban tombs

== Bibliography ==
- Bull, Ludlow S: The Tomb of Two Sculptors at Thebes, The Metropolitan Museum of Art Bulletin, vol. 20, no. 8, 1925, pp. 205–205. www.jstor.org/stable/3254313
- Davies, N. de Garis: The Tomb of Puyemré at Thebes, 2 vols. New York: MMA, 1923 volume one, online, volume two, online
- Lythgoe, Albert M.: The Tomb of Puyemrê at Thebes, in: The Metropolitan Museum of Art Bulletin, vol. 18, no. 8, 1923, pp. 186–188. www.jstor.org/stable/3254611.
- Porter, Bertha and Rosalind Moss: Topographical Bibliography of Ancient Egyptian Hieroglyphic Text, Reliefs, and Paintings. I, 1. The Theban Necropolis: Private Tombs. Oxford: Clarendon Press, 1960. pp. 71–75.
- Strudwick, Nigel, and Helen Strudwick: Thebes in Egypt: A Guide to the Tombs and Temples of Ancient Luxor. Ithaca, NY: Cornell UP, 1999. Print.
- Stupko-Lubczyńska: The chapel of Hatshepsut as an inspiration for the Theban tombs decoration: the case of TT 39 (Puyemre), in: Études et Travaux' 26 (2), Anastasiia 2013.653–678.
