= TT174 =

Theban tomb

Theban tomb TT174
- Burial site of Ashakhet
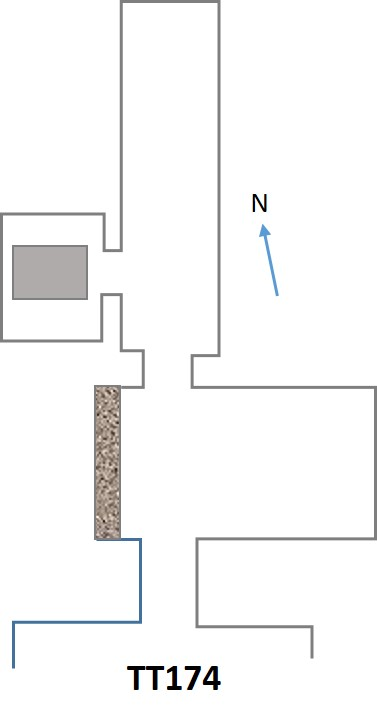

- Location within Egypt
- Location: El-Khokha, Theban Necropolis
- ← Previous; TT173 Next → TT175

I1 t Z2 Aa1 t Y1 Z2
Ashakhet
in hieroglyphs
Era: New Kingdom
(1550–1069 BC)

Tomb TT174 is in El-Khokha, located in the Theban Necropolis in Thebes, Upper Egypt. It is the sepulchre of Ashakhet, who was a priest in front of Mut. The tomb dates to the 19th Dynasty.

Ashakhet and his wife Tadjabu are depicted at a family banquet in the hall of the tomb. Their son Pakhihet (TT187) is shown offering to his parents.

== See also ==
- List of Theban tombs
