= TT48 =

Theban tomb

Coordinates: 25.7333°N 32.6000°E

Theban tomb TT48
- Burial site of Amenemhat called Surer
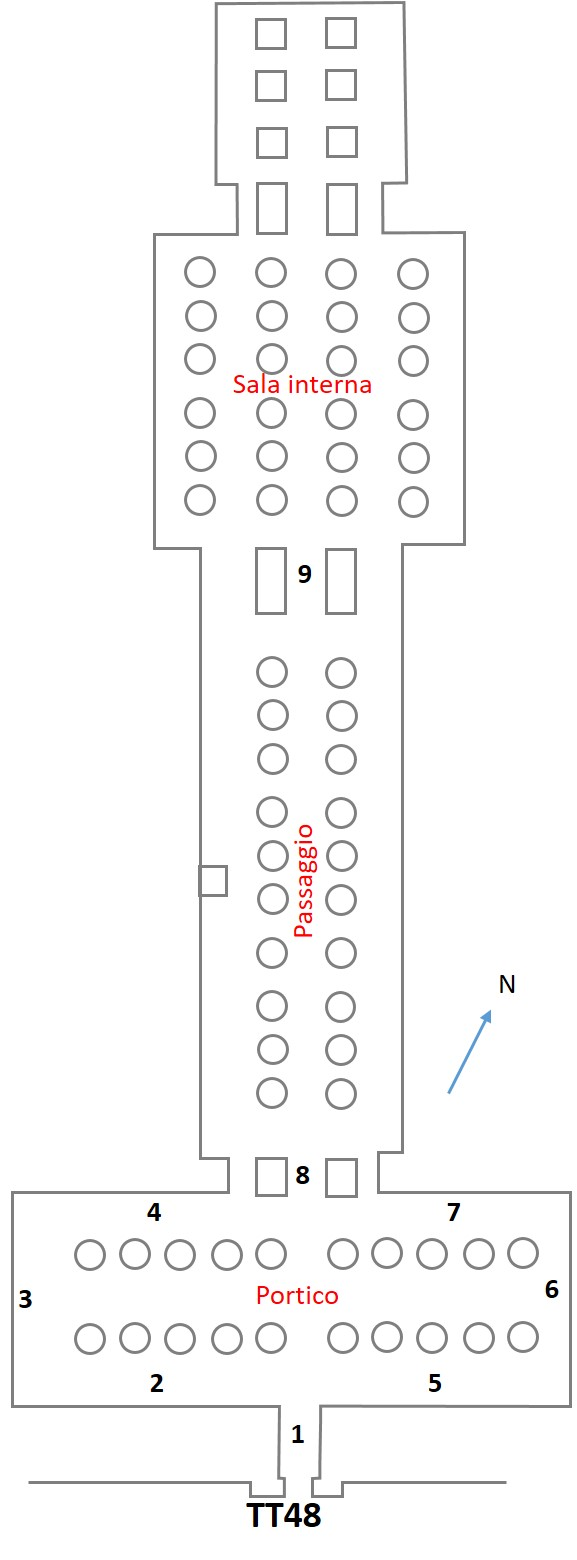

- Location within Egypt
- Location: El-Khokha, Theban Necropolis
- ← Previous; TT47 Next → TT49

i mn n m F4 t Z1
called sw w r Z1 r Z1
Amenemhat called Surer
in hieroglyphs
Era: New Kingdom
(1550–1069 BC)

The Theban Tomb TT48 is located in El-Khokha, part of the Theban Necropolis, on the west bank of the Nile, opposite to Luxor. TT48 was the burial place of the ancient Egyptian named Amenemhat called Surer, who was a Chief Steward, At the head of the King, Overseer of the Cattle of Amun. Amenemhat called Surer dates to the time of Amenhotep III from the middle of the Eighteenth Dynasty of Egypt. He was a son of Ith-taui, who was an overseer of the cattle of Amun and the lady Mut-tuy.

== Tomb ==
The tomb of Amenemhat called Surer consists of a portico, a passage and an inner hall. The portico is the first chamber in the tomb, and it contains twenty pillars. The south wall is decorated with scenes of Surer gods and goddesses including Geb, Nut, Osiris and Isis. Offering lists are depicted while rituals are performed before a statue of Surer. In another scene offering bringers appear before Surer and his mother Mut-tuy. The western wall shows scenes from a harvest festival celebrated by Amenhotep III. The king is shown making offerings and adoring the gods. On the eastern wall Amenhotep is shown followed by his ka. The northern wall shows more scenes of king Amenhotep III. Surer is depicted as he appears before his king who is seated in a kiosk. Other scenes show the king slaying his enemies. Images of statues of the king and Queen Tiye are shown as they are waiting to be consecrated. Equipment shown in the tomb represent items made for the Sed festival in year 30 of Amenhotep III. The passage and the inner hall are decorated with scenes of Surer adoring the gods.

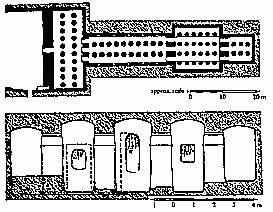
Sketch of the plan of TT48

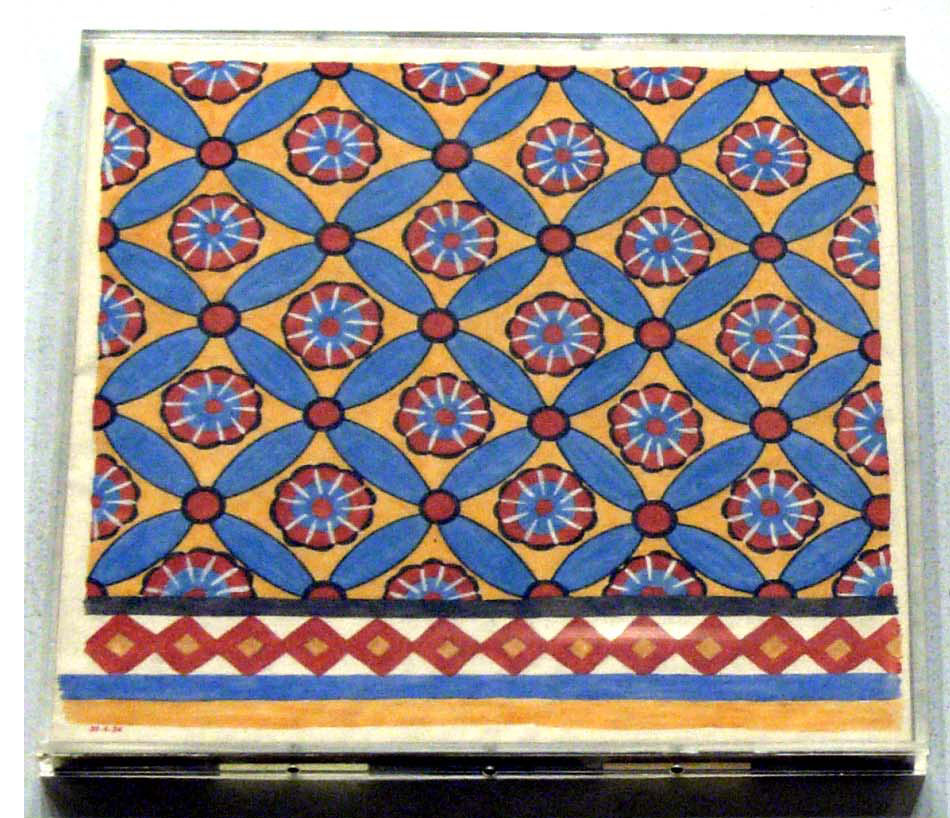
Tomb of Amenemhat Surer. Ceiling fragment. MET.

== See also ==
- List of Theban tombs
- N. de Garis Davies – Nina and Norman de Garis Davies, Egyptologists
