= TT178 =

Theban tomb

Theban tomb TT178
- Burial site of Neferronpet called Kenro
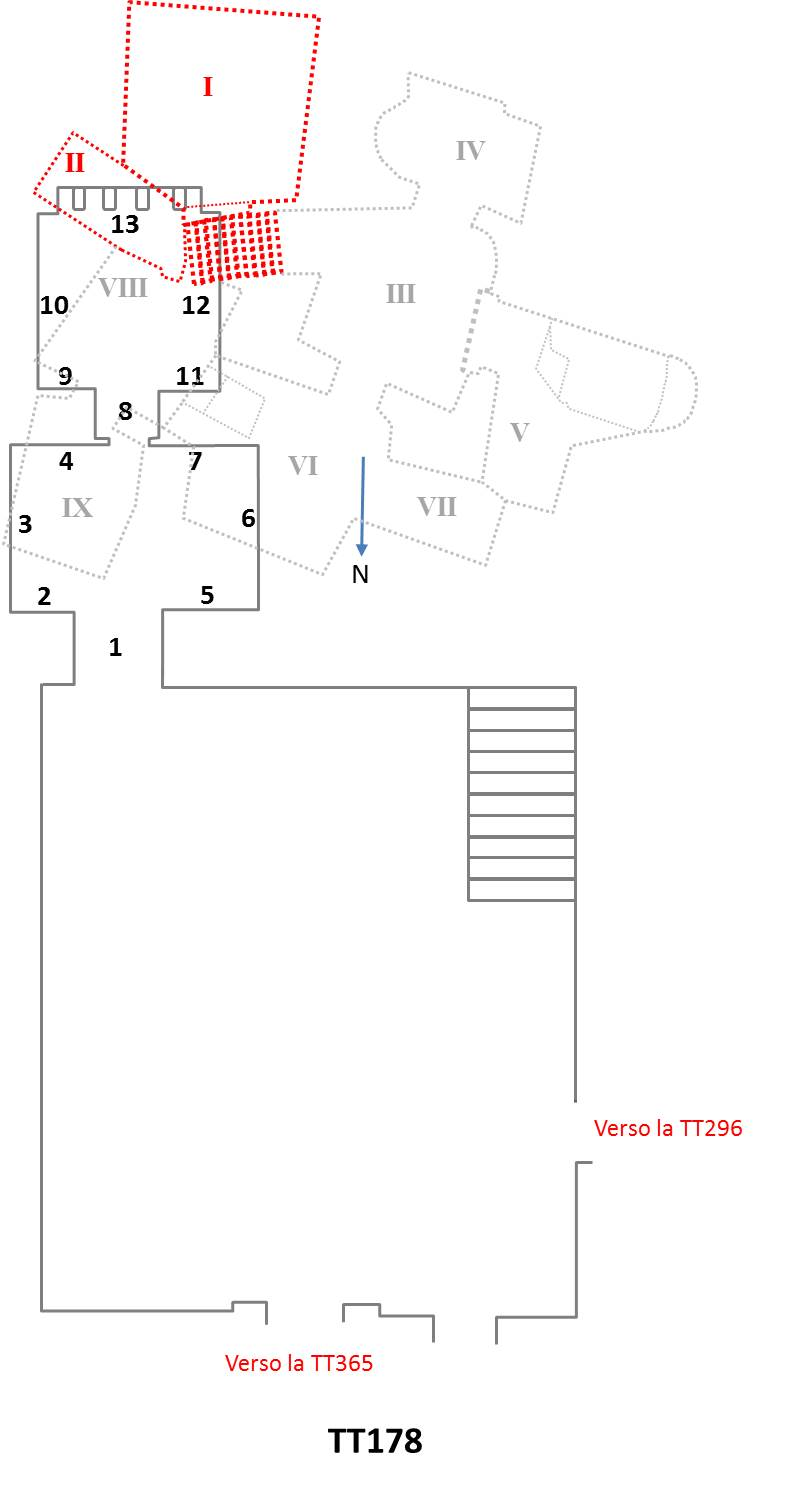

- Location within Egypt
- Location: El-Khokha, Theban Necropolis
- ← Previous; TT177 Next → TT179

F35 M4 t Z1 called k n Z2 r Z1
Neferronpet called Kenro
in hieroglyphs
Era: New Kingdom
(1550–1069 BC)

The Theban Tomb TT178 is located in El-Khokha, part of the Theban Necropolis, on the west bank of the Nile, opposite to Luxor.

TT178 was the burial place of the ancient Egyptian named Neferronpet called Kenro, who was a scribe of the treasury in the estate of Amun-Re. Neferronpet called Kenro lived during the reign of Ramesses II during the Nineteenth Dynasty of Egypt. He had a wife named Mutemwia. In the inner room Neferronpet called Kenro is said to be the son of a man named Piay. Four seated statues include those of the priest of Amun named Piay and a woman named Wiay (his mother?)

== The tomb ==
The tomb consists of a hall and an inner room. The hall contains scenes depicting Kenro and his wife adoring. They are shown censing and libating before offerings made to Amenhotep I and Ahmose Nefertari. In another scene Kenro and his wife Mutemwia are shown playing the game senet while a harpist sings before them. A man named Bakenwer, who was a priest and lector of Ptah is shown offering incense, bread and beer to Kenro and his wife, while in another scene is he shown offering a bouquet to Kenro.

The funerary procession depicted in the hall shows and names several men. They include a man named Ray, one named Panehesy and a man named Huy, who is described as his (Kenro's) brother. The person offering the libations is named Pre-rekh, while the lector priest is named Amenemone.

In the inner room treasury, the scribes Bakamun and Nai are shown kneeling and libating before Kenro and his wife Mutemwia. An offering list detailing some 36 items in included on the walls of the inner chamber. The offerings range from bread and cakes to beer and wine. The treasury scribe Khaemope is shown in another scene offering to Kenro and his wife as the couple is seated in a kiosk. Pre-rekh and Bakenwer, who were shown in the hall, also appear in offering scenes in the inner room. Pre-rekh is described as his friend.

A short corridor of the tomb shows on its walls the deceased and his wife adoring Osiris and Isis, on one side, and Ra-Horakhti and Maat, on the other side; on the ceiling the ba bird appears. A rectangular chamber presents, on its walls: on two registers and eight scenes the deceased Neferronpet or Kenro adoring a mummiform god and the deceased Neferronpet or Kenro and his wife adoring Taweret and Hathor in the guise of a sacred cow. On other tomb walls, the deceased and his wife offer libations to a personified Djed pillar with Anubis, Thoth and Wepwawet with Sokar-Osiris represented as a falcon. In one scene, the deceased, indicated as Kenro, supervises the work of bead makers, sculptors and cooks; the House of Gold of Amun with the control of the weight of the gold recorded by scribes and men storing provisions. At the back a niche houses four statues: the deceased and his wife, a certain [Ni]ay, a wab priest of Amun and another character of whose name only the hieroglyph for "y" remains

A text in the inner room identifies Kenro's father as a man named Piay. A priest of Amun named Piay also appears as one of the seated statues in a niche in the inner room. The other statues depict Kenro, his wife Mutemwia, and a woman named Wiay.

== Tomb extension ==
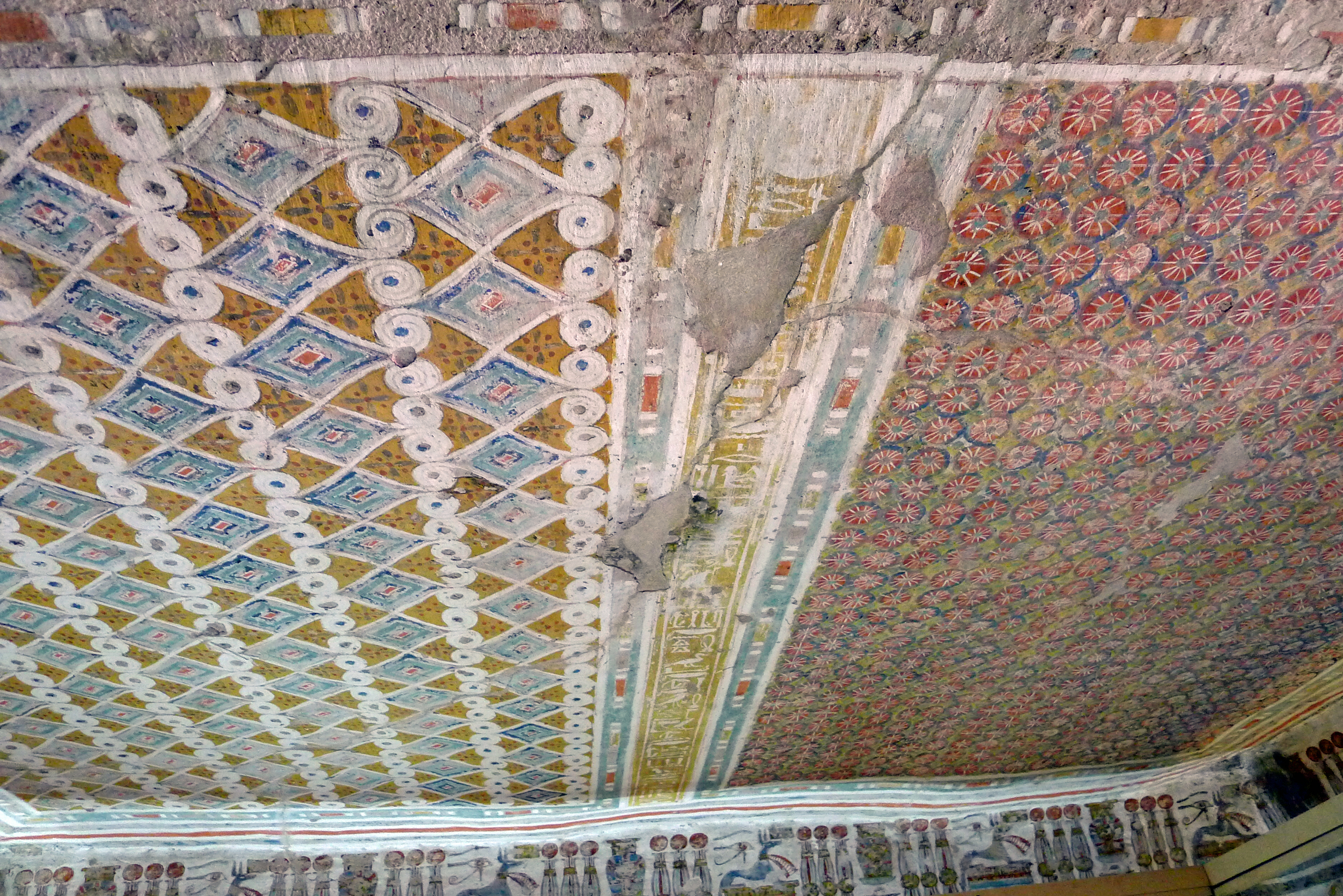
The Tomb ceiling of TT178

The tomb also includes an underground apartment which is accessed via a well approximately 5 metres deep which is located in the south-east corner of the innermost rectangular room (in grey or red dotted line on the plan); however, due to the stylistic details of the excavation, it is believed that only rooms I[N 11] and II[N 12] (in red on the plan) are contemporary with TT178 and were part of the funerary apartment of Neferronpet and Mutemwia; the remaining rooms (from III to IX in grey on the plan) were probably excavated later, perhaps to house other members of their family. The discovery of fragments of a chest and of an ushabti with the name of Piay, and of a fragment of the sarcophagus with the name of Mutemwia confirms their actual burial in the first two rooms--room I and II--of the tomb floor plan.

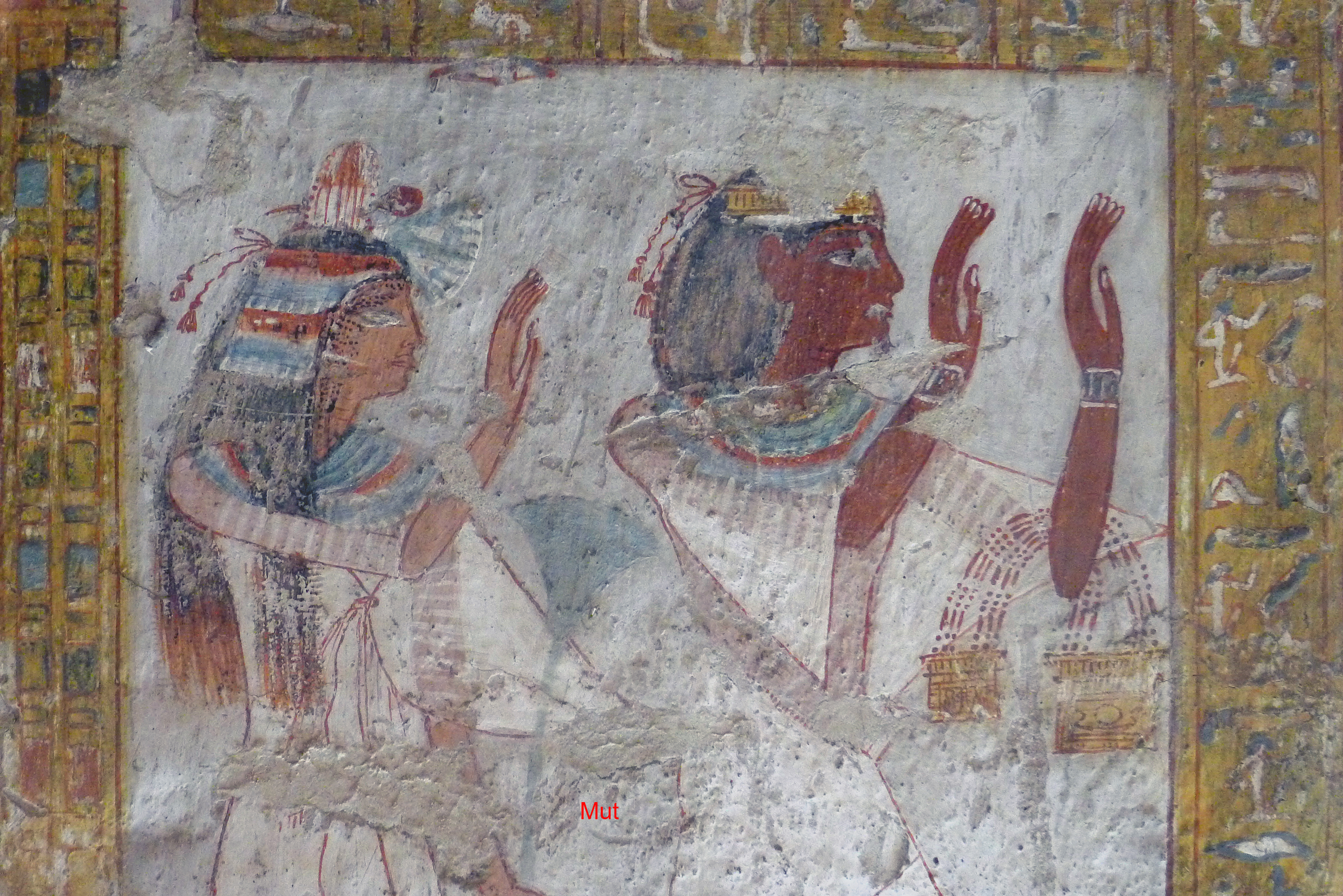
Neferronpet and Mutemwia in TT178

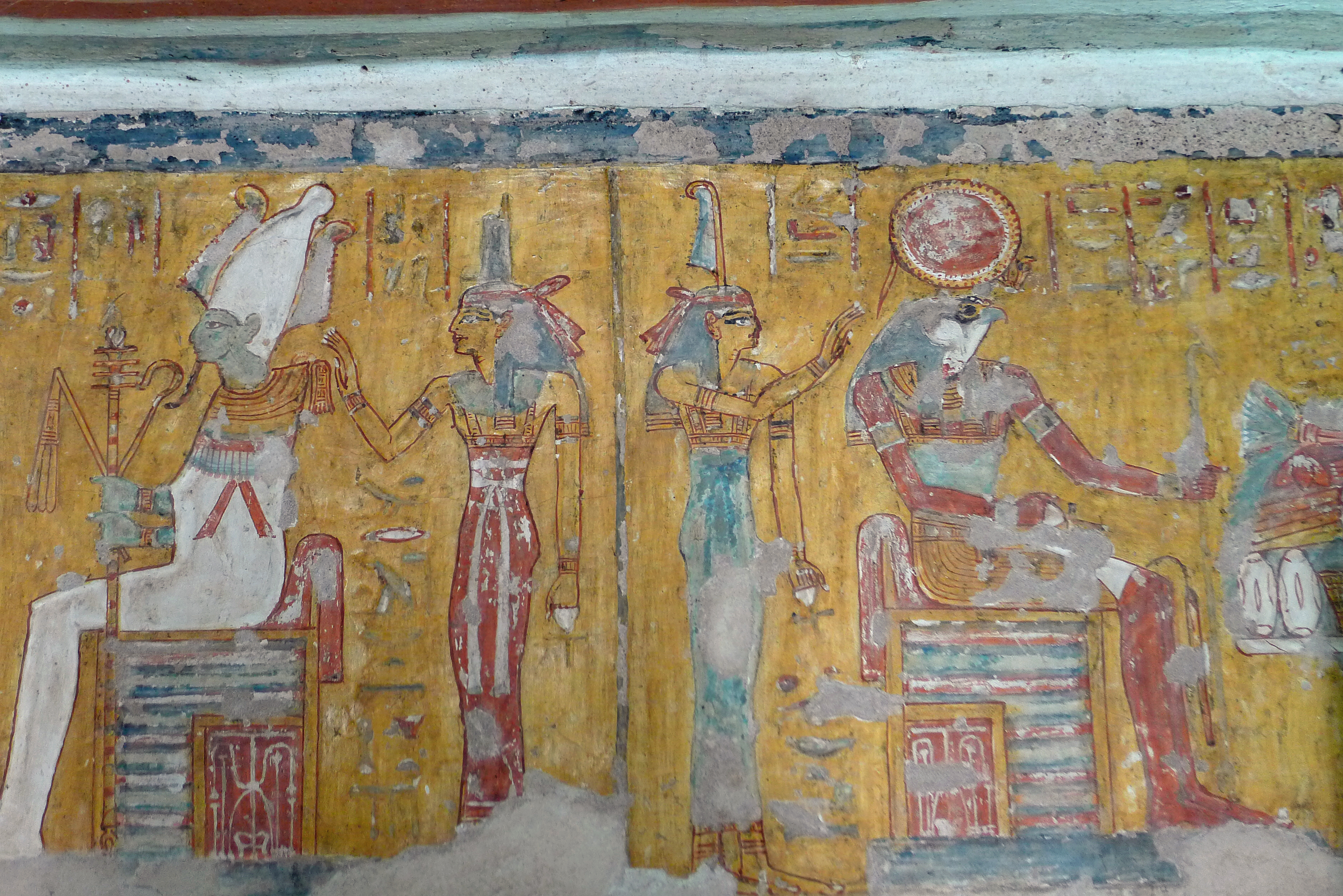
Osiris, Isis, Ra-Horakhti and Maat in TT178

== See also ==
- List of Theban tombs
