= TT177 =

Ancient Egyptian tomb

Theban tomb TT177
- Burial site of Amenemopet
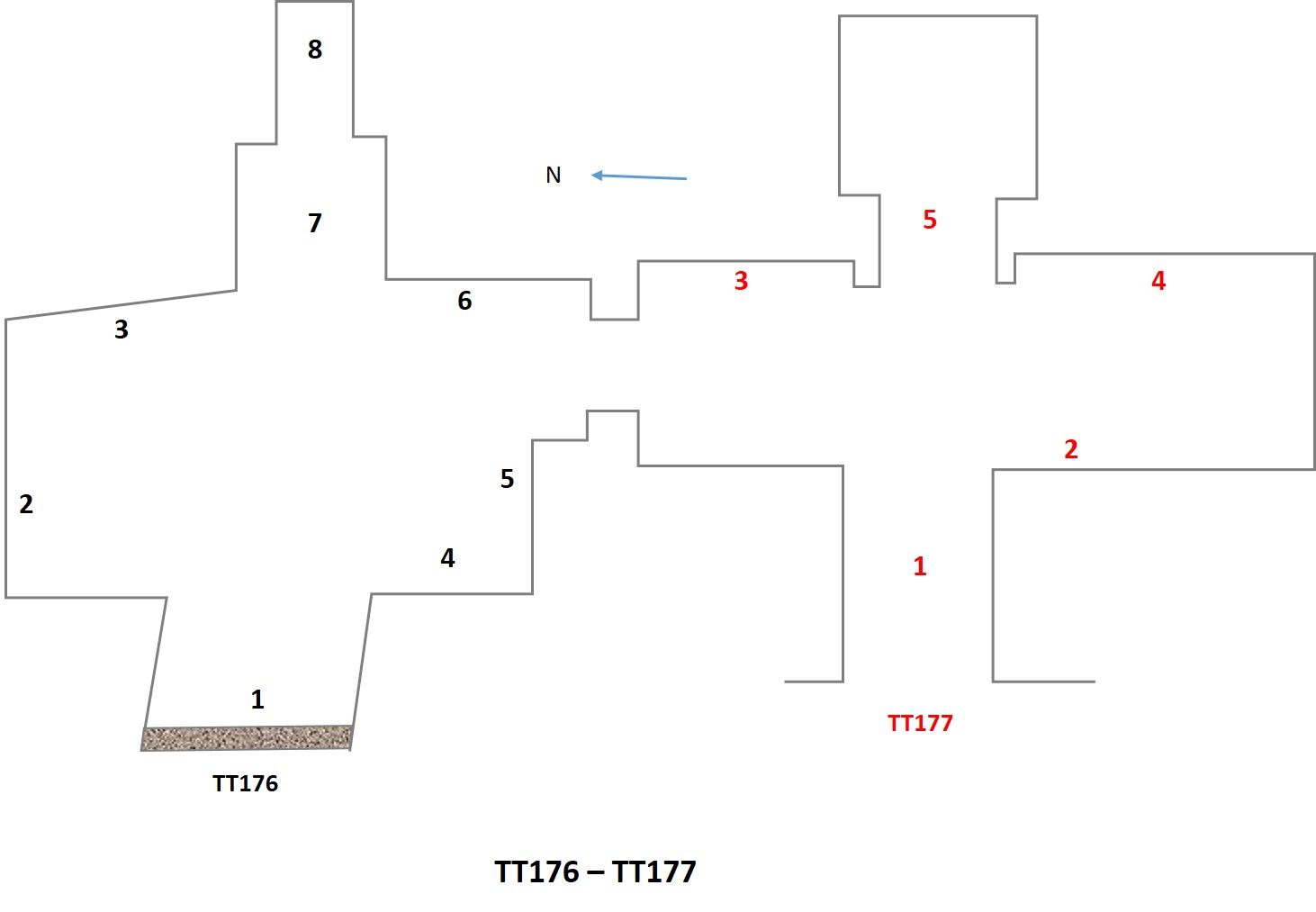

- Location within Egypt
- Location: El-Khokha, Theban Necropolis
- ← Previous; TT176 Next → TT178

i mn n Aa13 i p t pr
Amenemopet
in hieroglyphs
Era: New Kingdom
(1550–1069 BC)

The Theban Tomb TT177 is located in El-Khokha, part of the Theban Necropolis, on the west bank of the Nile, opposite to Luxor.

TT177 was the burial place of the ancient Egyptian named Amenemopet, who was a scribe of truth in the Ramesseum in the estate of Amun. Amenemopet lived during the reign of Ramesses II during the Nineteenth Dynasty of Egypt. He was the son of a man named Nebkhed, who was a scribe of the divine seal of the estate of Amun.

The tomb contains a hall which is decorated. Kitchen translates the titles of Amenemopet as lector of Amun in the Temple of Usimare Setepenre, and true scribe in the Temple of Usimare Setepenre in the Estate of Amun. Amenemopet's father, Nebqed, is said to be a scribe of the God's valuables of the Estate of Amun.

== See also ==
- List of Theban tombs
