= TT46 =

Theban tomb

Coordinates: 25.7333°N 32.6000°E

Theban tomb TT46
- Burial site of Ramose
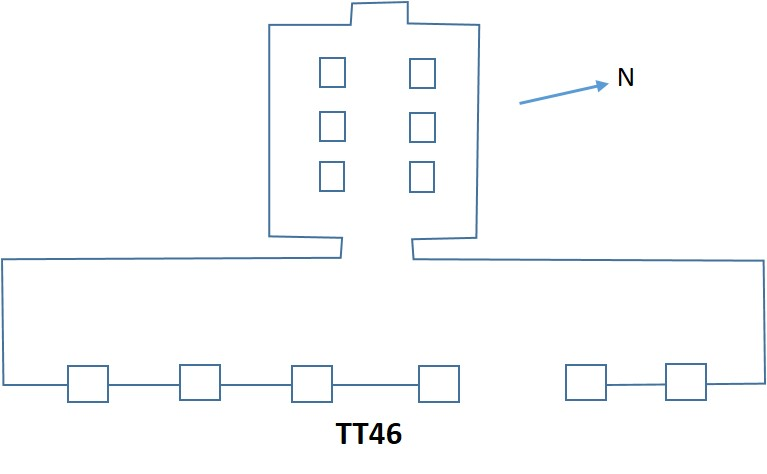

- Location within Egypt
- Location: Sheikh Abd el-Qurna, Theban Necropolis
- ← Previous; TT45 Next → TT47

N5 Z1 ms s
Ramose
in hieroglyphs
Era: New Kingdom
(1550–1069 BC)

The Theban Tomb TT46 is located in Sheikh Abd el-Qurna. It forms part of the Theban Necropolis, situated on the west bank of the Nile opposite Luxor.

TT46 is the burial site of an ancient Egyptian named Ramose, who served as Steward of the Mansion of the Aten and Overseer of the Granary of Upper and Lower Egypt. In the tomb, Ramose is described as an honoured one of Queen Ahmose Nefertari. He also holds the title First priest of Amun in Menset which refers to the mortuary temple of Queen Ahmose Nefertari. Ramose dates to the time of Amenhotep III during the middle of the Eighteenth Dynasty of Egypt. His wife, Nefertkha, was a singer of Hathor and a singer of Amun. Ramose was the steward of the Mansion of the Aten according to the inscriptions in his tomb, which places him during the reign of Akhenaten (Amenhotep IV).

== See also ==
- List of Theban tombs
