= TT187 =

Theban tomb

Theban tomb TT187
- Burial site of Pakhihet
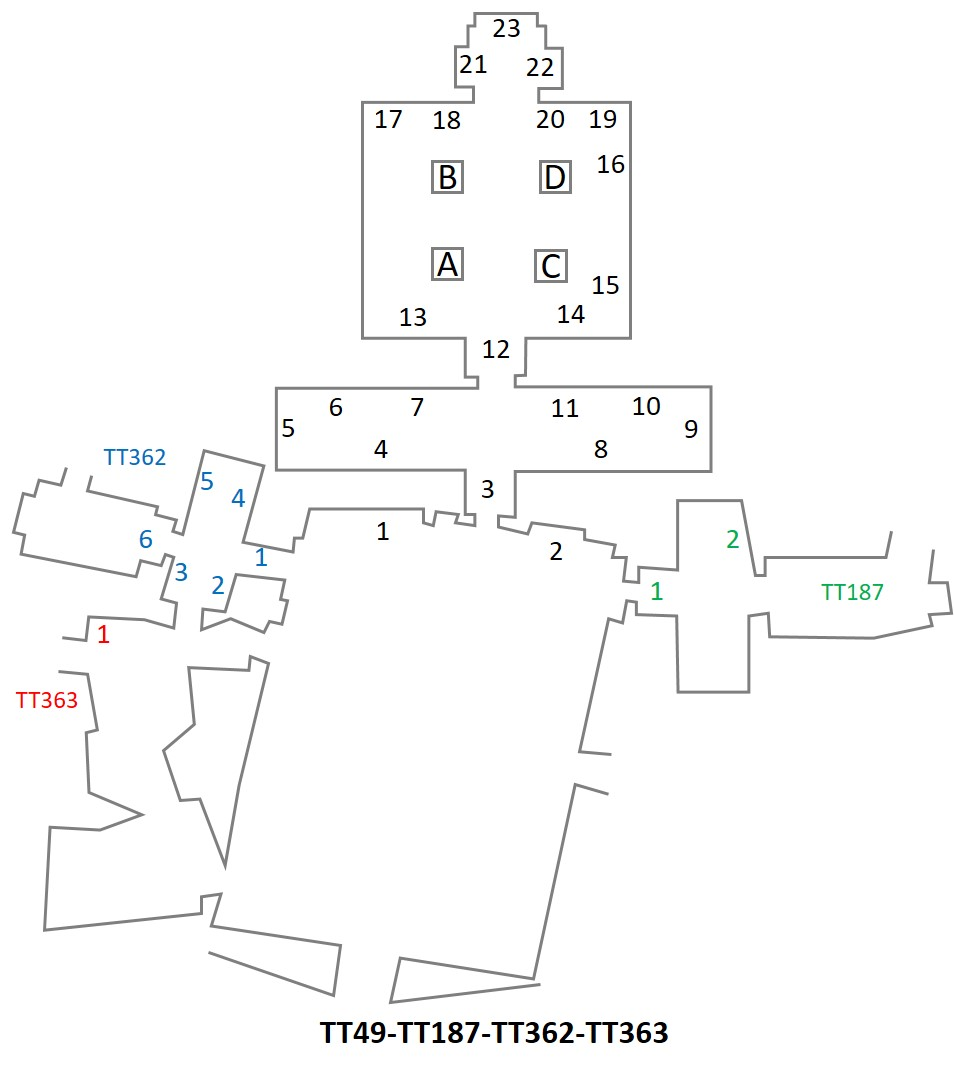

- Location within Egypt
- Location: El-Khokha, Theban Necropolis
- ← Previous; TT186 Next → TT188

G40 Aa1 Z4 i i F4 t Z1
or G40 N1 F4 t Z1
Pakhihet
in hieroglyphs
Era: New Kingdom
(1550–1069 BC)

Tomb TT187, located in the necropolis of El-Khokha in Thebes, Egypt, is the tomb of a wab-priest of Amun named Pakhihet.

Pakhihet was the son of Ashaket (TT174), who was a priest in front of Mut, and Tadjabu. His wife's name was Mutemonet. The scenes in the tomb show Pakhihet and two sons on a lintel in the hall, and elsewhere with his wife Mutemonet and a daughter.

== See also ==
- List of Theban tombs
