= El-Khokha =

Necropolis of ancient Thebes, Egypt

Coordinates: 25°43′56″N 32°36′44″E

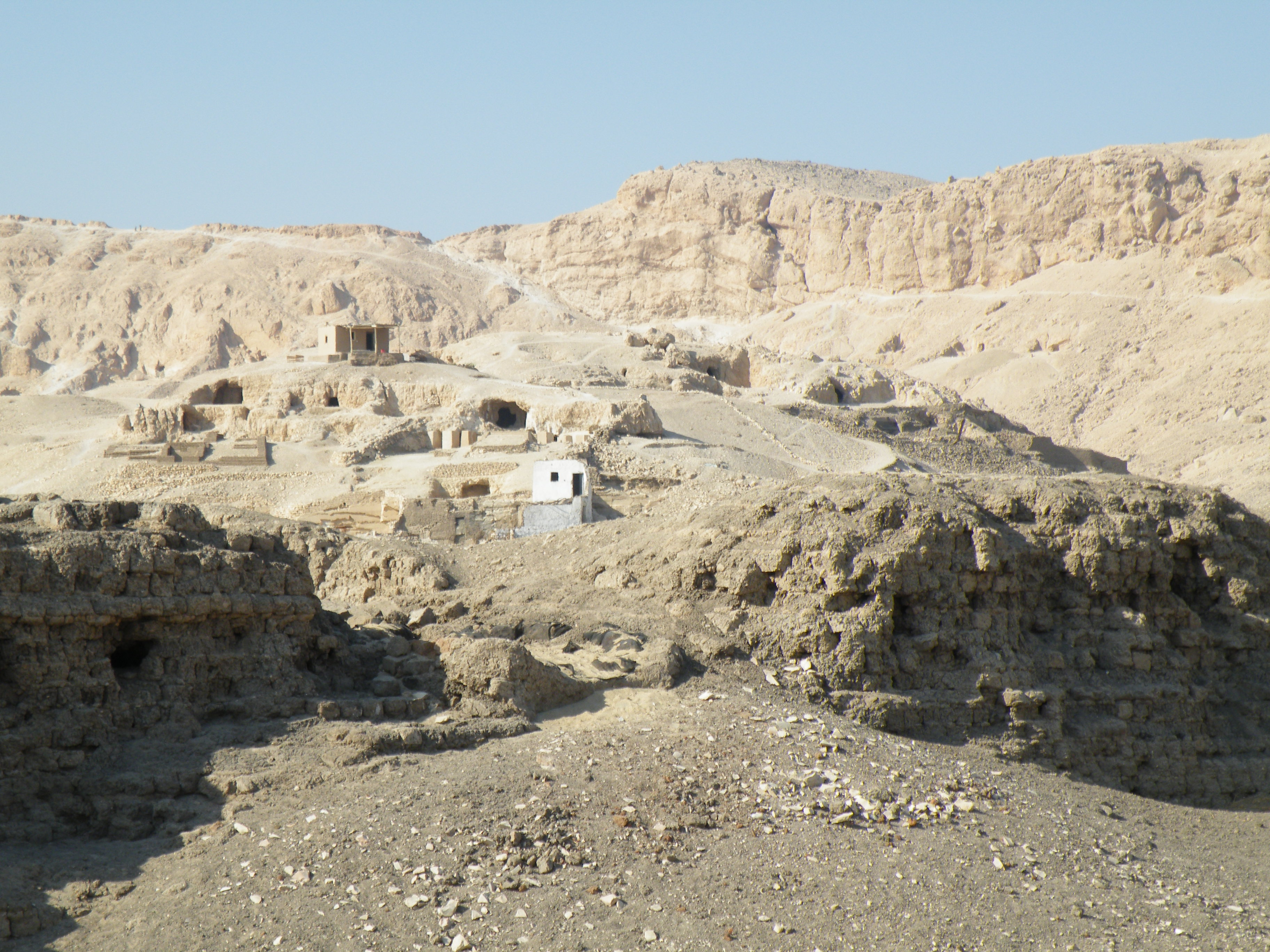
El-Khokha necropolis, Thebes, Egypt

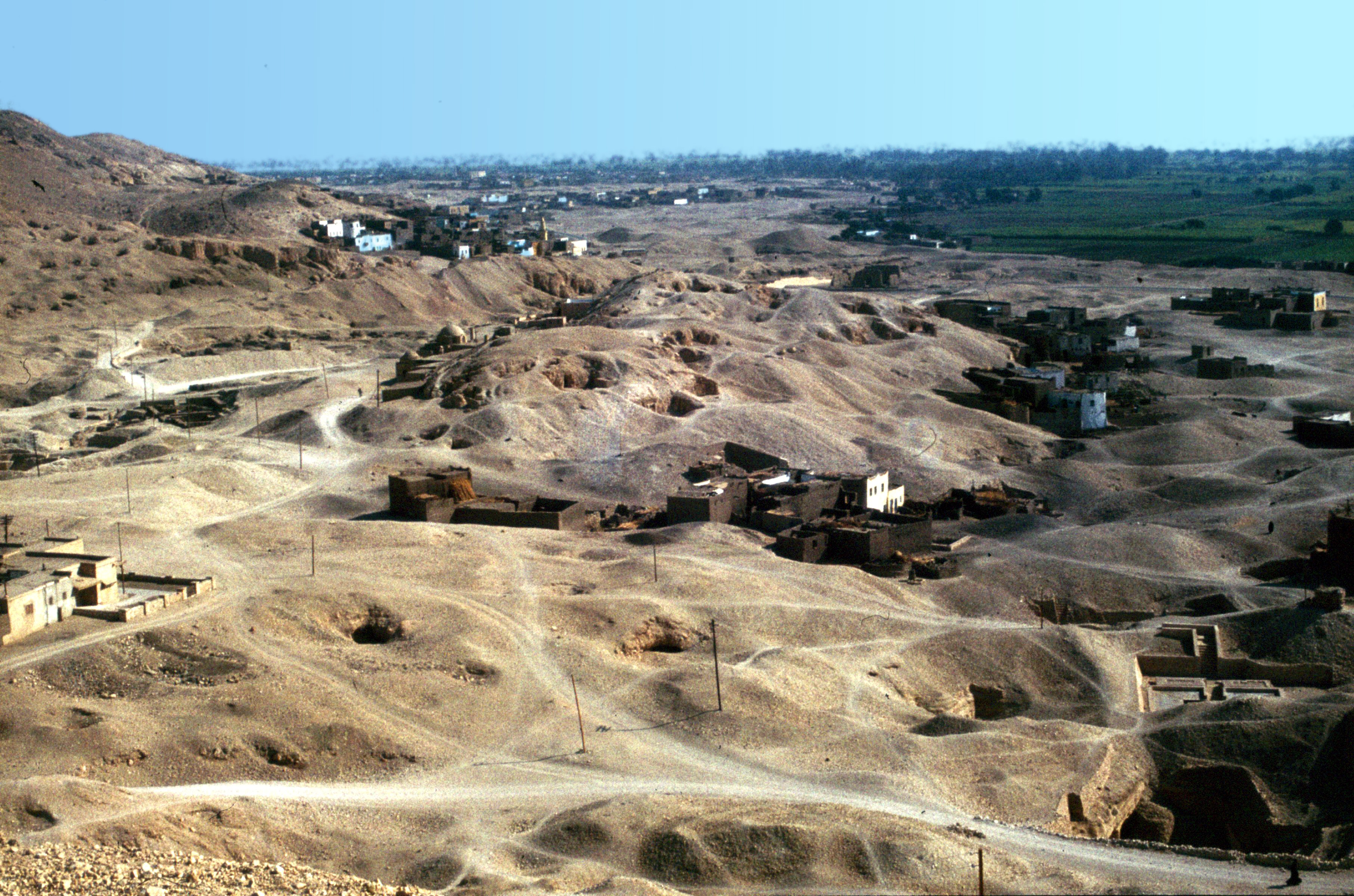
El-Khokha from above.

The necropolis of El-Khokha (Arabic: الخوخه) is located on the west bank of the river Nile at Thebes, Egypt. The necropolis is surrounds a hill and has five Old Kingdom tombs and over 50 tombs from the 18th, 19th and 20th dynasties as well as some from the First Intermediate Period and the Late Period.

== Tombs ==
- TT39 – Puimre, Second Prophet of Amun, from the time of Hatshepsut
- TT48 – Amenemhat, also called Surer, Chief Steward; from the time of Amenhotep III
- TT49 – Neferhotep, Chief Scribe of Amun, from the 19th Dynasty
- TT172 – Mentiywiy Royal Butler, child of the nursery; from the time of Tuthmosis III to Amenhotep II
- TT173 – Khay, Scribe of divine offerings of the gods of Thebes, from the 19th Dynasty
- TT174 – Ashakhet, Priest in front of Mut; from the 20th Dynasty
- TT175 – Unknown, from the 18th Dynasty
- TT176 – Userhet, Servant of Amun, clean of hands; from the 18th Dynasty
- TT177 – Amenemopet, Scribe of Truth in the Ramesseum in the estate of Amun, from the time of Ramesses II
- TT178 – Kenro, also called Neferrenpet, Scribe of the treasury in the Amun-Ra domain, from the time of Ramesses II
- TT179 – Nebamon, Scribe, Counter of grain in the granary of divine offerings of Amun, from the time of Hatshepsut
- TT180 – Unknown, from the 19th Dynasty
- TT181 – Ipuky and Nebamon, Sculptor of Pharaoh and Head sculptor of Pharaoh resp.; from the Late 18th Dynasty
- TT182 – Amenemhat, Scribe of the mat, from the time of Thutmose III
- TT183 – Nebsumenu, Chief Steward, Steward in the house of Ramesses II, from the time of Ramesses II
- TT184 – Nefermenu, Mayor of Thebes, Royal Scribe, from the time of Ramesses II
- TT185 – Senioker, Treasurer of the God, Hereditary Prince, Divine Chancellor; from the First Intermediate Period
- TT186 – Ihy, Governor; from the First Intermediate Period
- TT187 – Pakhihet, wab-priest of Amun; from the 20th Dynasty
- TT198 – Riya, Head of the magazine of Amun in Karnak; from the Ramesside Period
- TT199 – Amenarnefru, Overseer of the store-rooms; from the 18th Dynasty
- TT200 – Dedi, Governor of the deserts on the wet of Thebes, Head of the troops of Pharaoh; from the time of Tuthmosis III – Amenhotep II
- TT201 – Re, First herald of the king; from the 18th Dynasty
- TT202 – Nakhtamun, Prophet of Ptah Lord of Thebes, Priest in front of Amun; from the 19th Dynasty
- TT203 – Wennefer, Divine Father of Mut; from the 19th Dynasty, Ramesses II
- TT204 – Nebanensu, Sailor of the high priest of Amun; from the 18th Dynasty
- TT205 – Tutmosis, Royal Butler; from the 18th Dynasty
- TT206 – Ipuemheb, Scribe of the Place of Truth; from the Ramesside Period
- TT207 – Horemheb, Scribe of divine offerings of Amun; from the Ramesside Period
- TT208 – Roma, Divine Father of Amun-Ra; from the Ramesside Period
- TT209 – Seremhatrekhyt, Hereditary Prince, Sole beloved friend; from the Late Period (Saite)
- TT238 – Neferweben, Royal butler clean of hands; from the 18th Dynasty
- TT245 – Hori, Scribe, Overseer of the estate of the great wife of the king; from the 18th Dynasty
- TT246 – Senenre, Scribe; from the 18th Dynasty
- TT247 – Samut, Scribe, Counter of cattle of Amun; from the 18th Dynasty
- TT248 – Tutmosis, Maker of offerings of Thutmose III; from the 18th Dynasty
- TT253 – Khnummose, from the 18th Dynasty (Amenhotep III)
- TT254 – Mose (Amenmose), from the Late 18th Dynasty
- TT256 – Nebenkemet
- TT257 – Mahu or Neferhotep
- TT258 – Menkheper
- TT264 – Ipiy
- TT294 – Amenhotep (Usurped by Roma), from the time of Amenhotep II
- TT295 – Paroy, also called Tuhmosis
- TT296 – Nefersekheru or Pabasa
- TT362 – Paanemwaset, Priest of Amun; from the 19th Dynasty
- TT363 – Paraemheb, Overseer of Singers of Amun; from the 19th Dynasty
- TT365 – Nefermenu, Overseer of Wig-Makers of Amun in Karnak, Scribe of the Treasury of Amun
- TT369 – Khaemwaset, High priest of Ptah, Third priest of Amun; from the 19th Dynasty
- TT370 – Unknown, Royal Scribe; from the Ramesside Period
- TT371 – Unknown, from the Ramesside Period
- TT372 – Amenkhau, Overseer of Carpenters of the Temple of Ramesses III; from the 20th Dynasty
- TT373 – Amenmessu, Scribe of the Altar of the Lord of the Two Lands
- TT374 – Amenemopet, Treasury Scribe in the Ramesseum
- TT405 – Khenti, Nomarch; from the First Intermediate Period
- TT413 – Unasankh, Nomarch; from the First Intermediate Period
- B1 – Mehehy, Priest of Amun El-Khokha (Location lost); from the Ramesside Period
- B2 – Amenneferu, Priest at the fore El-Khokha (Location lost); from the mid Dynasty 18
- B3 – Hauf, El-Khokha (Location lost); from the Late Period

== See also ==
- List of Theban Tombs
