= TT83 =

Theban tomb

Theban tomb TT83
- Burial site of Amethu called Ahmose
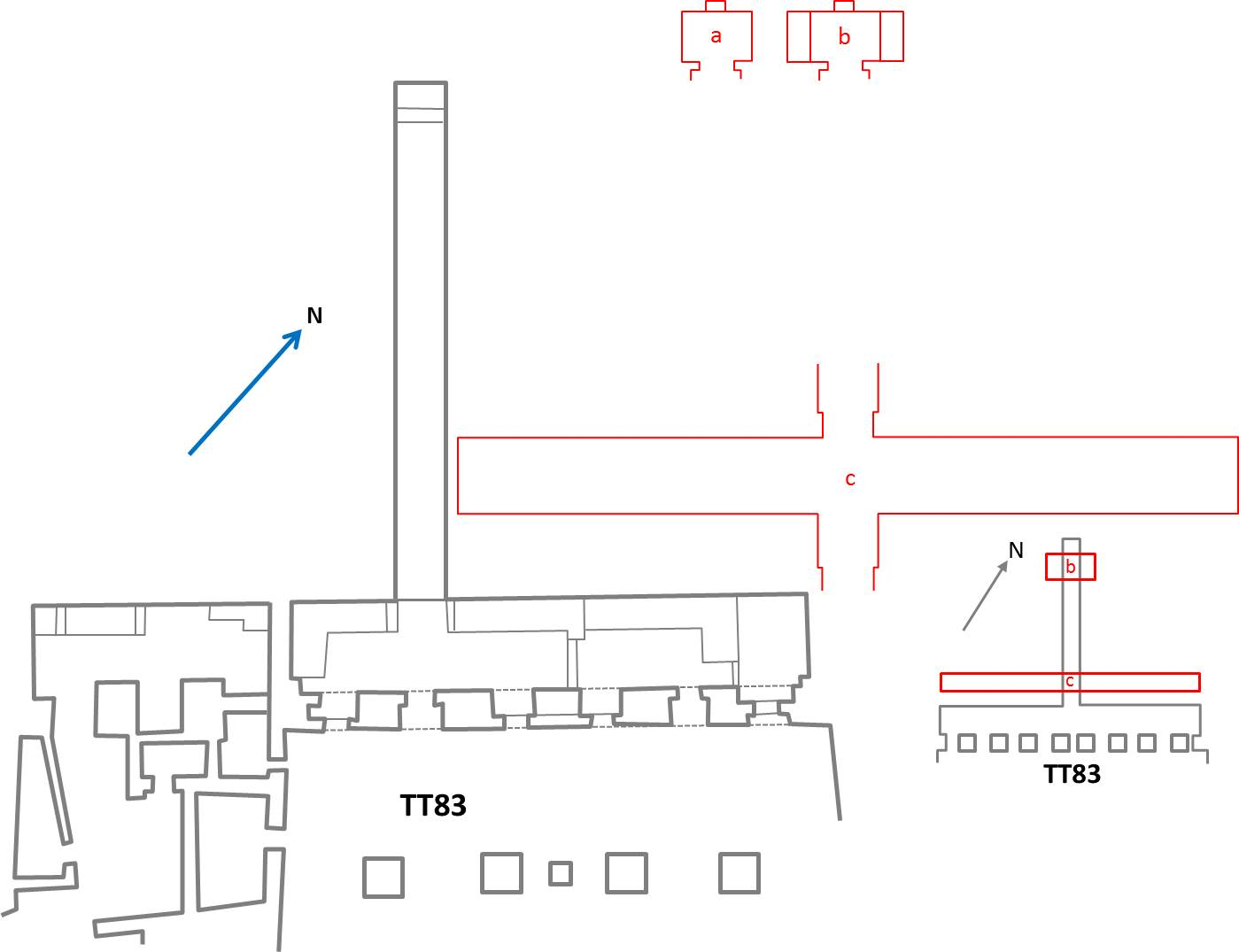

- Location within Egypt
- Location: Sheikh Abd el-Qurna, Theban Necropolis
- ← Previous; TT82 Next → TT85

O29 D38 V13 G36 called N11 ms s
Amethu
in hieroglyphs
Era: New Kingdom
(1550–1069 BC)

The Theban Tomb TT83 is located in Sheikh Abd el-Qurna, part of the Theban Necropolis, on the west bank of the Nile, opposite to Luxor. It is the burial place of the ancient Egyptian official, Amethu called Ahmose, who was the Governor of the town and Vizier. Amethu called Ahmose dates to the Eighteenth Dynasty of Egypt, from the time of Tuthmosis III.

The tomb was known in the 19th century when the Egyptologist Sir John Gardiner Wilkinson lived in the tomb in the 1820s.

== Family ==
Amethu called Ahmose and his wife Ta-Amethu were the parents of the Vizier Useramen (TT131) and Neferweben and the grandparents of the Vizier Rekhmire (TT100).

== Tomb ==
The tomb consists of a portico and an inner room. The ceiling of the portico show remains of the titles of the deceased. The inner room contains scenes depicting rites before the mummy and provide the name and titles of Useramen.

== See also ==
- List of Theban tombs
