= Installation of the Vizier =

The Installation of the Vizier, alternatively the Instruction of Rekhmire or the Regulation Laid Upon the Vizier Rekhmire, is an ancient Egyptian text dating to the New Kingdom found in the tomb of the official Rekhmire at Thebes. It describes the office of the Egyptian vizier, his appointment, his duties, his relationships to other officials, and how to behave. The vizier's main functions according to the Regulation are in the fields of the judiciary, treasury, war, interior, agriculture, and general executive.

Two other copies of the Installation of the Vizier have survived, one in the tomb of Useramen (vizier to Hatshepsut and Thutmose III) and another in the tomb of Amenemipet (vizier to Amenhotep II and Thutmose IV); however, neither is complete.
