= TT82 =

Theban tomb

Theban tomb TT82
- Burial site of Amenemhat
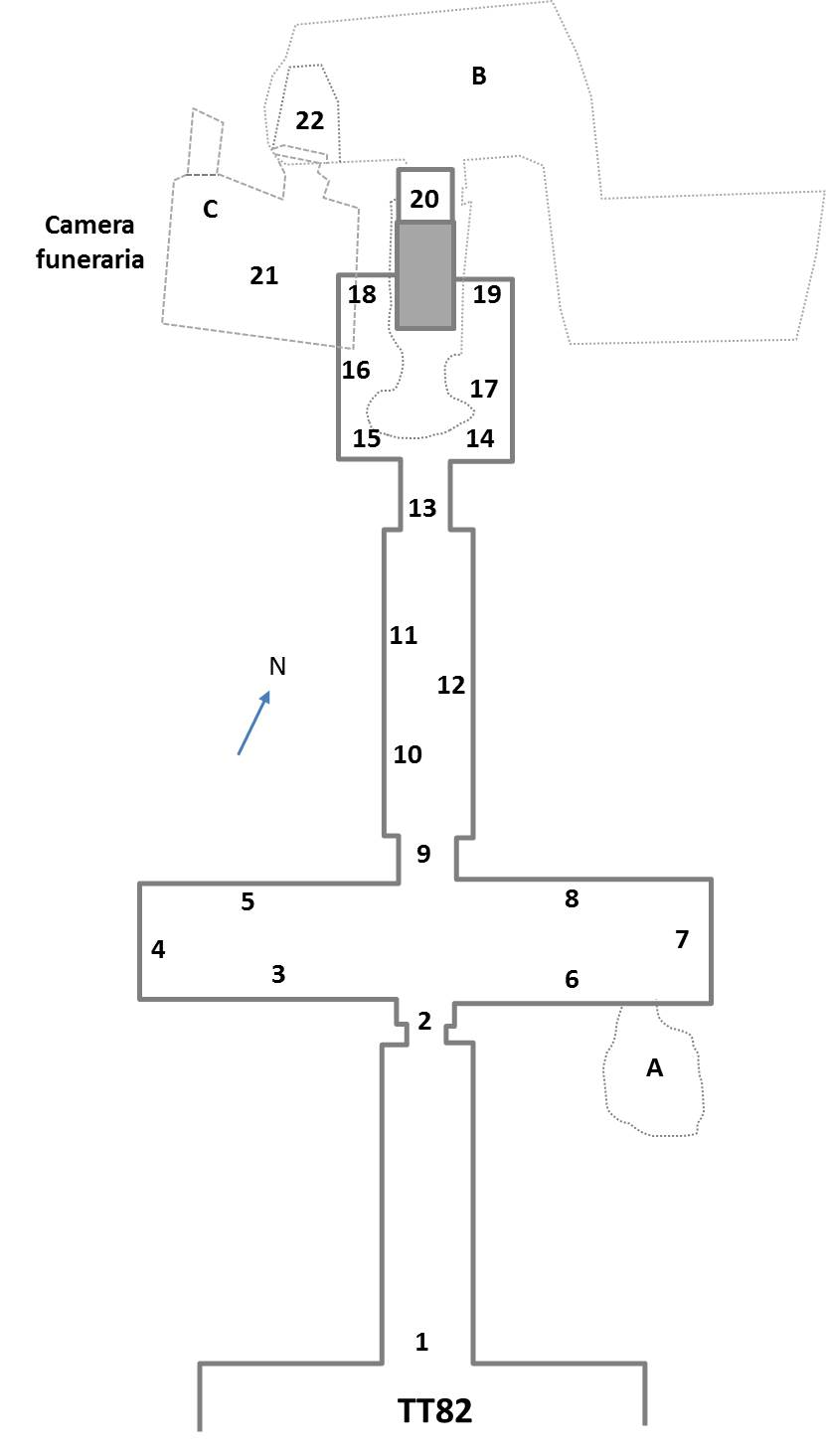

- Location within Egypt
- Location: Sheikh Abd el-Qurna, Theban Necropolis
- ← Previous; TT81 Next → TT83

i mn n m F4 t
Amenemhat
in hieroglyphs
Era: New Kingdom
(1550–1069 BC)

The Theban Tomb TT82 is located in Sheikh Abd el-Qurna, part of the Theban Necropolis, on the west bank of the Nile, opposite to Luxor. It is the burial place of the ancient Egyptian official Amenemhat, who was a counter of the grain of Amun and the steward of the vizier Useramen. Amenemhat dates to the Eighteenth Dynasty of Egypt, from the time of Tuthmosis III. As the scribe to the vizier Useramen Amenemhat documents the work in Thebes up to c.Year 28. This includes the withdrawal of silver, precious stines and more form the treasury and the manufacture of a number of statues made from silver, bronze and ebony. He also mentions the creation of a large lake near Thebes surrounded by trees and work on the royal tomb.

== Family ==
Amenemhat was a son of the Overseer of lands named Thutmose and his wife Antef. Amenemhat's wife was named Baketamun. Amenemhat's son who was also named Amenemhat is mentioned in the hall of the tomb. This son appears again as a sem-priest in the passageway, as does another son named Amenhotep. Two more sons named Amenemwaskhet and Useramun respectively are depicted in the inner room.

== Description ==
The entrance leads via a passage into the hall. From a hall a second passage leads to an inner room. The burial chamber is located at a lower level and contains a niche.

=== Entrance ===
The entrance contains remains of texts on the lintel and the jambs.

=== Hall ===
Further texts on the lintel and the jambs. The south-west wall contains a scene of relatives at a banquets before the vizier Useramen. On the adjacent western wall Amenemhat is shown offering to his ancestors and in another register to the architect and artisans who crafted the tomb. The north-west wall shows Amenemhat with his wife Baketamun and their son Amenemhet before offerings. Another register depicts a banquet ant a New Year Festival. This scene includes female musicians, dancers, male harpists and female clappers. Further scenes include bulls fighting.

On the south-east wall Amenemhat is shown offering to the vizier Amethu called Ahmose and his wife. The adjacent east wall shows Amenemhat and his wife Baketamun hunting gazelle in the desert. The north-east wall is decorated with a scene depicting a hippopotamus hunt along with fishing and fowling scenes.

=== Passage ===
The west wall of the passage includes a funeral procession and an Abydos pilgrimage on one end, while the other end is taken up with Amenemhat's son Amenhotep offering to his parents. The scene includes a small offering list. The east wall shows son Amenemhat offering to his parents. Offerings and an offering list are included here as well. The rest of the wall is decorated with a scene depicting a banquet and more people presenting offerings.

=== Inner room ===
The inner and outer doorways still contain remains of the texts added there. The south wall shows a scene with a banquet and still has the remains of an autobiographical text. The west wall shows more offering lists. This time the offering scene is presided over by their son Useramun. Other scenes on the west wall include chantresses of Hathor offering menats during the Festival of Hathor. The east wall has another offering scene with offering lists, this one showing their son Amenemwaskhet before Amenemhat and his wife Baketamun. The north wall shows Amenemhat before the Eastern and Western goddess. A niche at the end of the inner room contains statues of Amenemhat and his wife.

=== Burial chamber ===
The burial chamber is decorated with scenes from the Book of the Dead and pyramid texts. In the niche their son Amenemhat is depicted as a sem priest and brings offerings to his parents together with other children. The other wall shows a similar scene with Amenemhat and his mother. The back wall is decorated with text form the Book of the Dead and sacred bulls and cows.

== See also ==
- List of Theban tombs
