= TT100 =

Theban Tomb

Coordinates: 25.7314°N 32.6074°E

Theban tomb TT100
- Burial site of Rekhmire
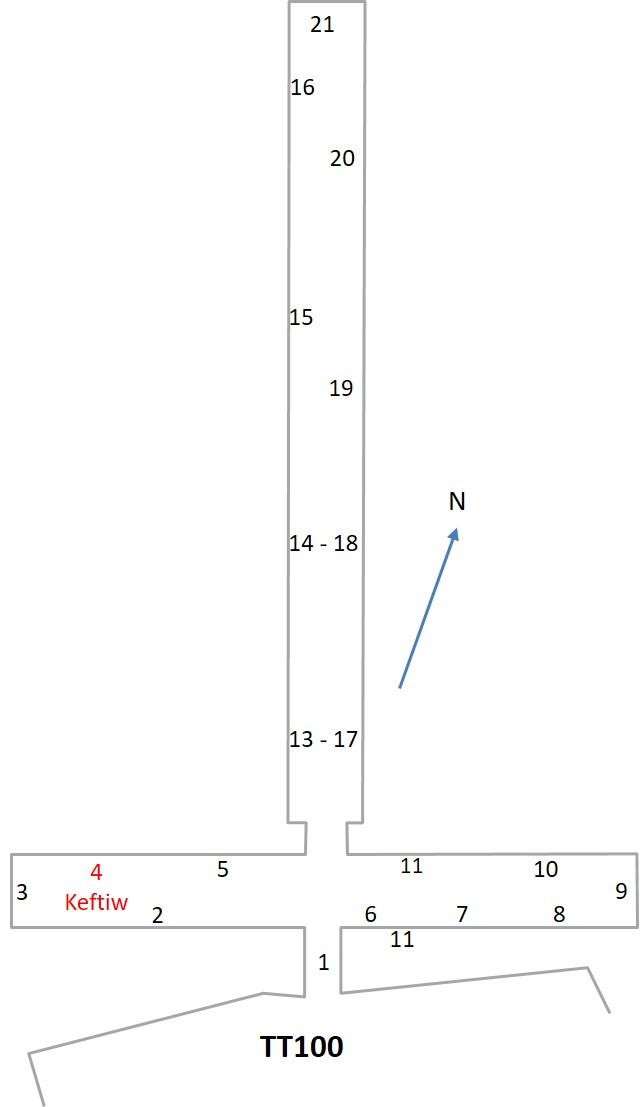

- Location within Egypt
- Location: Sheikh Abd el-Qurna, Theban Necropolis
- Discovered: Open in antiquity
- Layout: T-shaped
- ← Previous; TT99 Next → TT101

r Aa1 Y1 mi N5 Z1
Rekhmire
in hieroglyphs
Era: New Kingdom
(1550–1069 BC)

The Theban Tomb TT100 is located in Sheikh Abd el-Qurna, part of the Theban Necropolis, on the west bank of the Nile, opposite to Luxor. It is the mortuary chapel of the ancient Egyptian vizier Rekhmire. There is no burial chamber next to this chapel. The vizier's tomb is elsewhere, perhaps even in the Valley of the Kings. Rekhmire's tomb is important both because of its numerous painted reliefs and because it outlines the "Duties of the Vizier" which involved dealing with managing state taxation and the state treasury, remaining impartial and avoiding favouritism as judges and enforcers of the pharaoh's orders in trials, managing the temple's economies, appointing high state and religious officials and managing the proper performance of religious rituals all in accordance with Maat (the ancient Egyptian concepts of truth, balance, order, harmony, law, morality).

== Biography ==
Rekhmire, who in his TT100 tomb, includes over a hundred official titles, started out his career at the end of the reign of Thutmose III and his position was confirmed by this king's successor, Amenhotep II. But sometime during the reign of Amenhotep II, the historical and archaeological traces of him were erased from history. The figure of vizier Rekhmire, as well as that of his wife Meryt, often appear erased or chiseled away—as if they were deliberately erased from history—as well as those of their children whose names have, however, been reconstructed as Takhat, Mutneferet and Henuttawy for the females; Amenhotep, Mery, and Senusert Kenamun for the males. In tomb TT100, a certain Baki and his wife At also appear but no knowledge of any familial ties with the Vizier can be determined. It appears certain that Rekhmire, somehow, fell from favour in the reign of Amenhotep II and there is no evidence that he was ever buried in the beautiful tomb which he constructed.

== Tomb TT100 ==
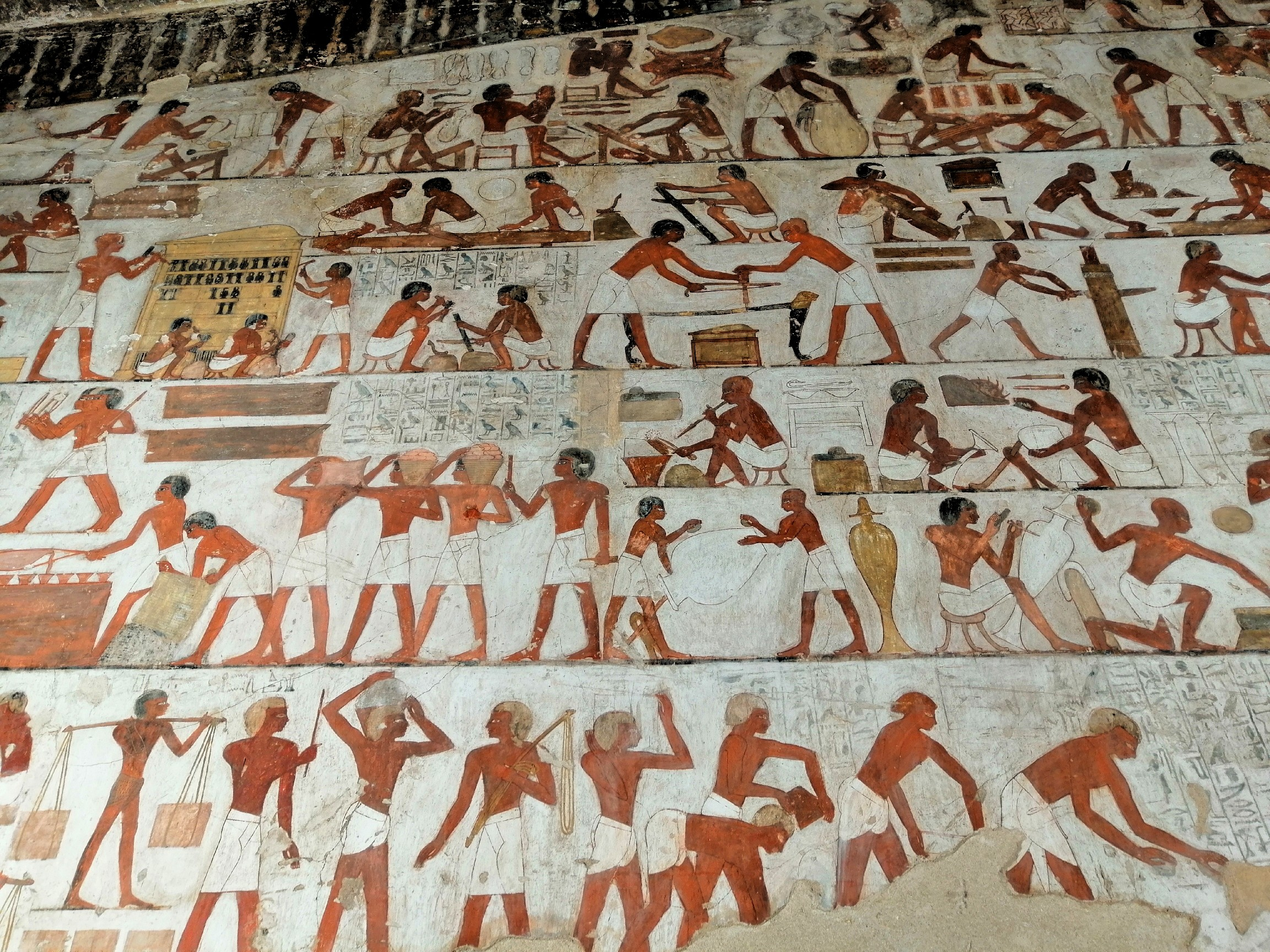
Craftsmen (bead makers, leather workers, carpenters, masons and sculptors) shown at work in Rekhmire's tomb.

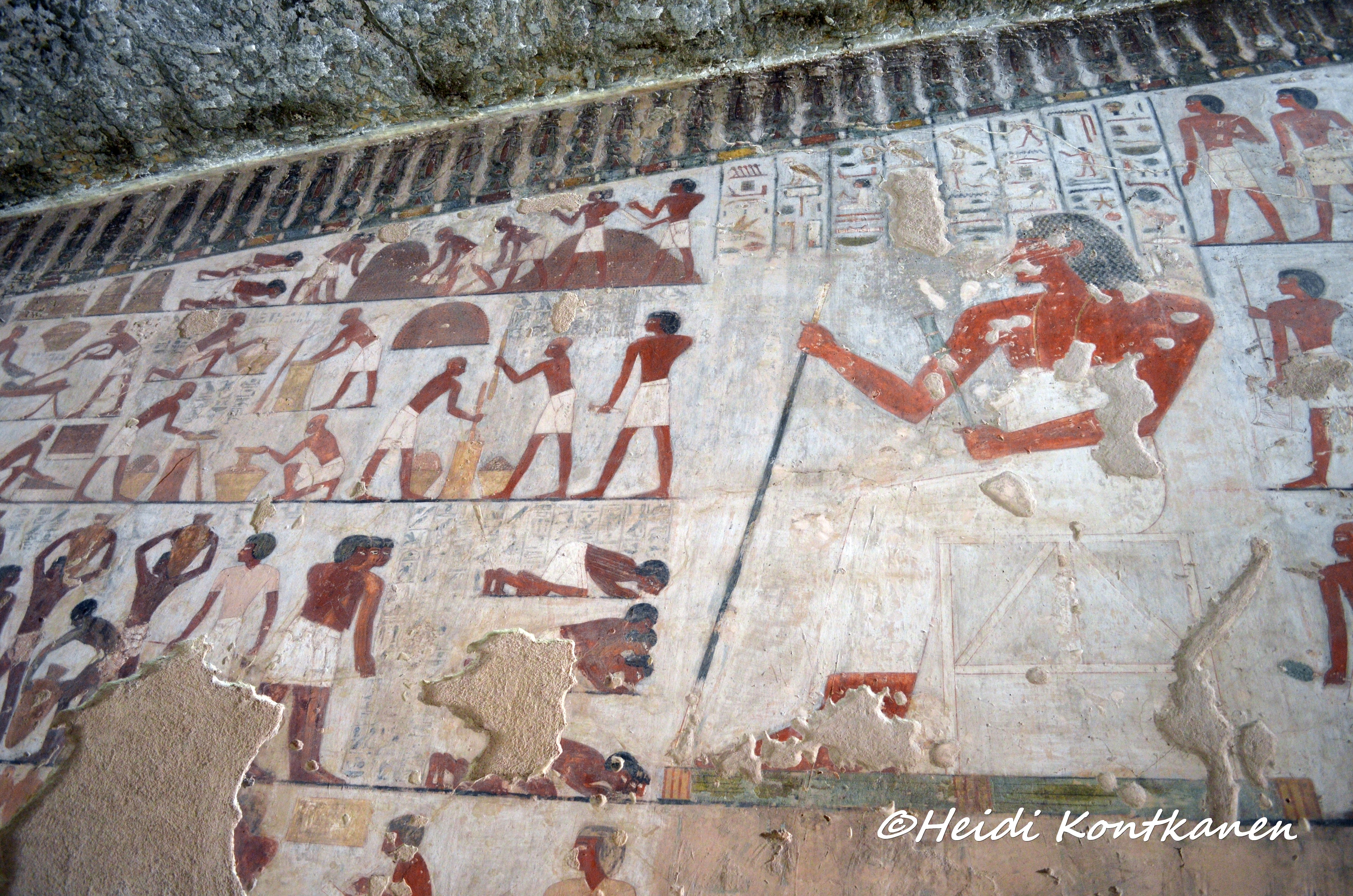
Relief of Vizier Rekhmire sitting on a stool (right) in Tomb TT100

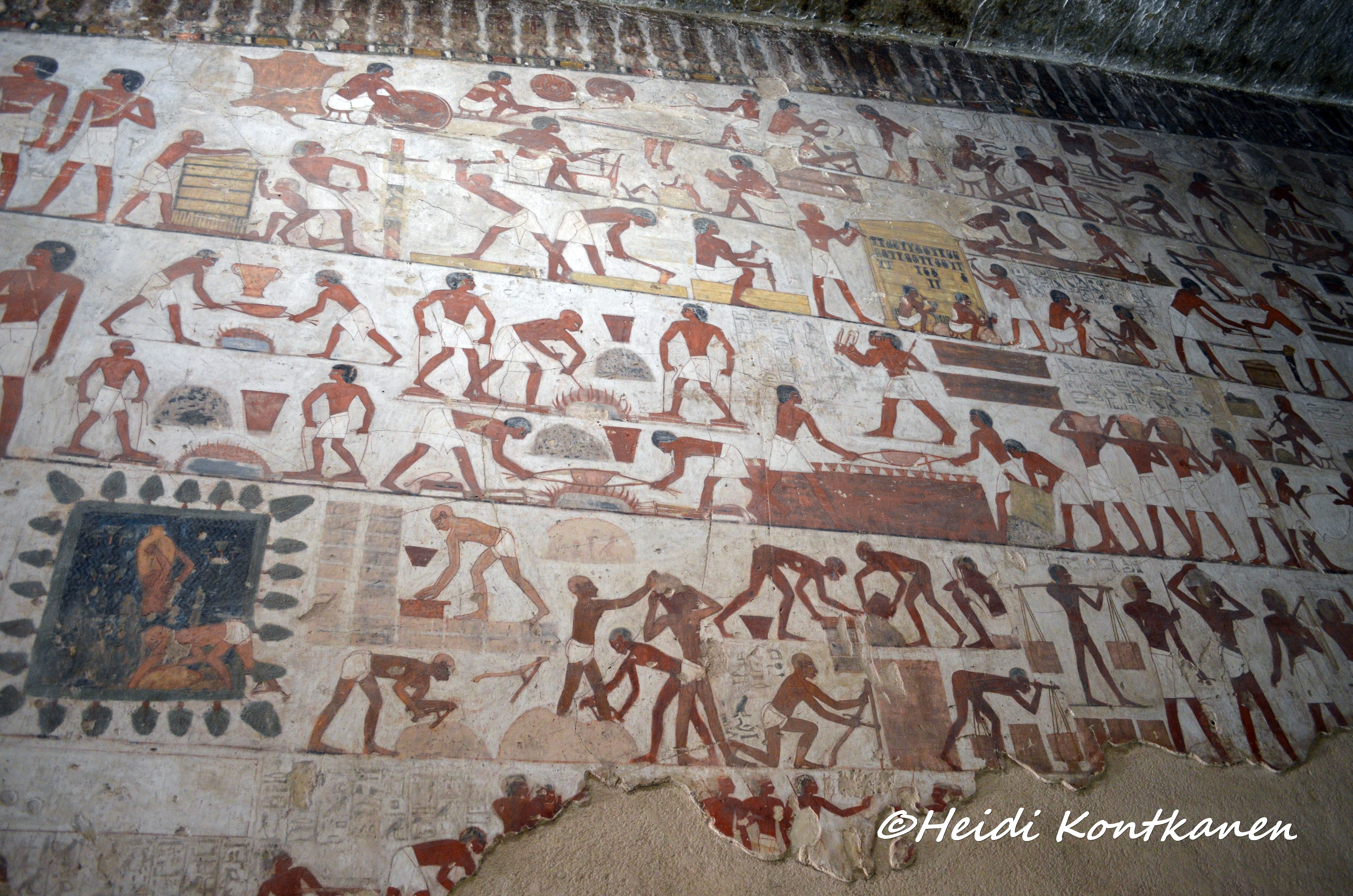
New Kingdom craftsmen (bead makers, leather workers, carpenters, masons and sculptors) shown at work in Tomb TT100.

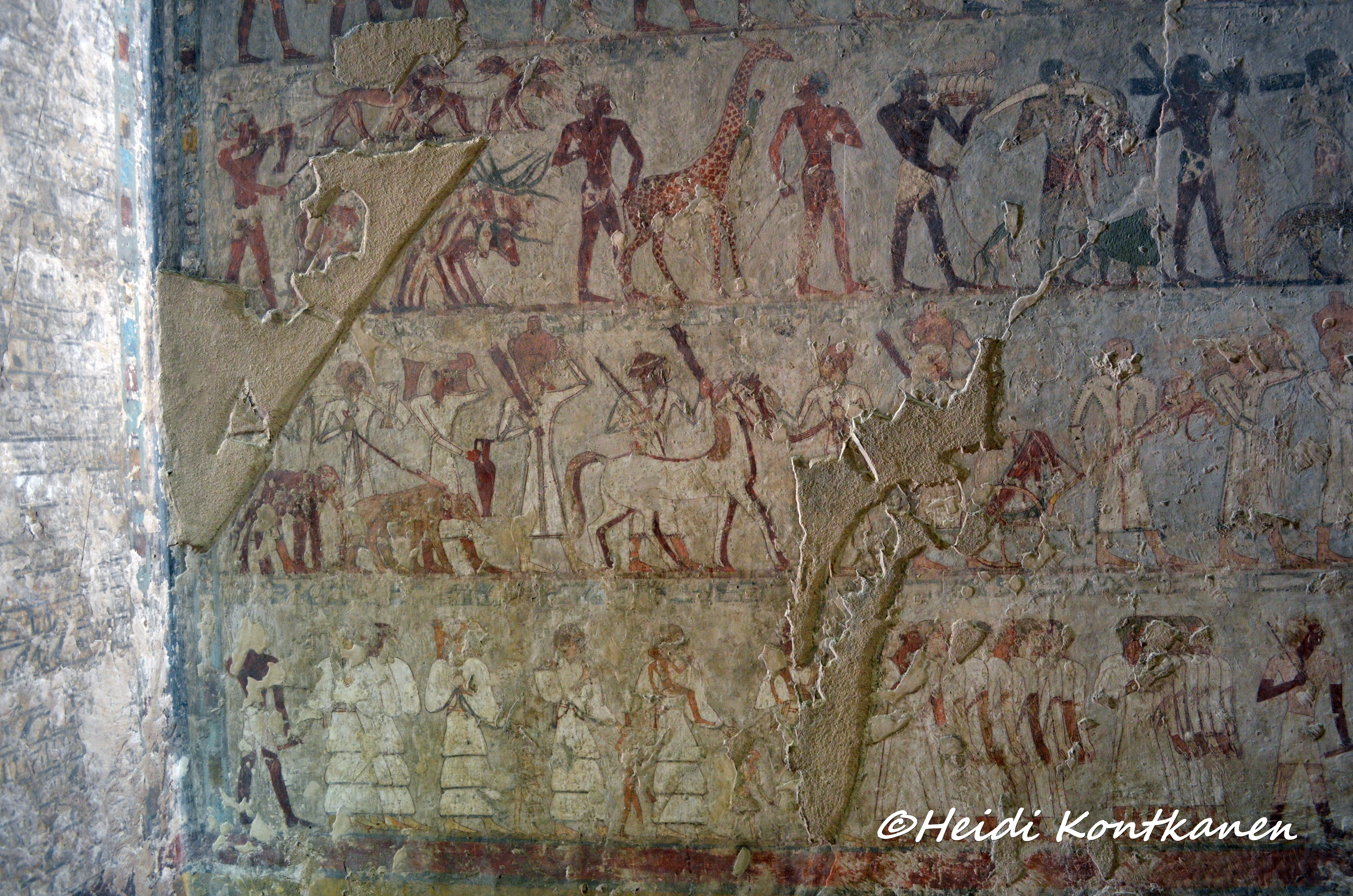
Relief of Nubians and Syrians brings forth tribute to the Egyptian king in Rekhmire's Tomb.

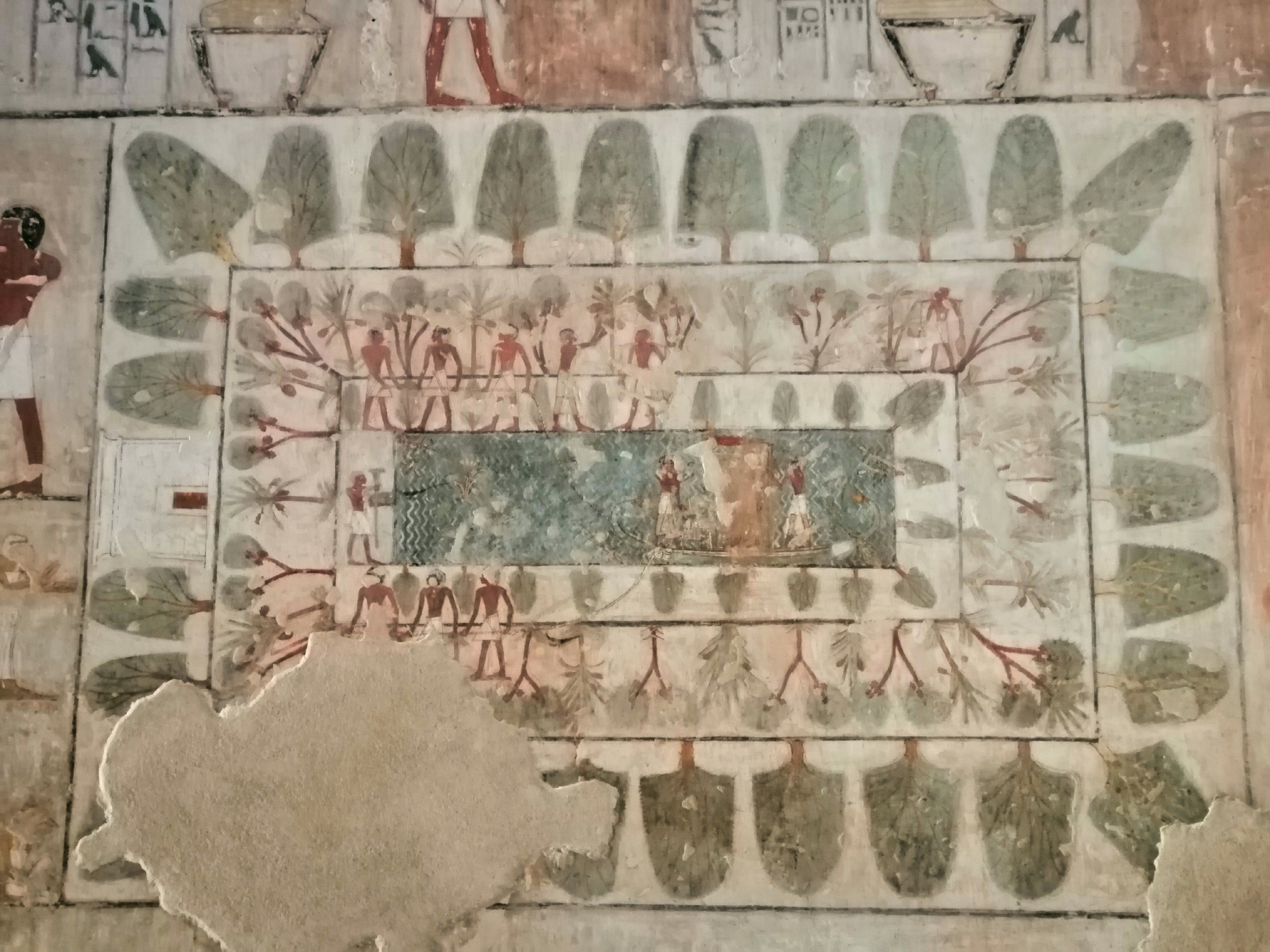
A unique painted relief depicting a pool containing fish surrounded by walls, with rows of trees, men picking dates, water plants, and three men dragging a boat on the pool in Rekhmire's tomb.

The tomb, which features a collection of wall paintings which are amongst the best preserved and largest in the Theban Necropolis, was developed in accordance to the inverted "T" scheme typical of the period. A particularity also makes it unique in the panorama of the area: from the transversal room (about 21 m wide, 2.30 deep and 3.30 high) a corridor branches off perpendicular to the previous one, just over 2 metres wide, almost 27 metres long, whose ceiling, starting from the 3.30 metres of the entrance, progressively rises until reaching, at the end of the corridor, the considerable height of over 8 metres. Artistically, almost every metre of the tomb is covered with paintings generally made on several superimposed registers which seems to multiply the already considerable number of scenes represented.

During its long history, Tomb TT100 was subjected to several hardships: during the reign of Amenhotep II, the images of Rekhmire, his wife Meryt and their children were erased; where they were easily reachable. they were completely removed by covering their remaining silhouettes with red colour, in other cases only the face was erased. It is believed, however, that Rekhmire was never buried in his intended tomb which must, therefore, have been only the burial chapel, a burial which, to date, has not yet been discovered. A new intervention to the detriment of the wall paintings occurred about 100 years later during the reign of Akhenaten, also known as the Amarna heresy, with the removal of all symbols relating to the god Amun. Further damage was inflicted on the tomb over the centuries, including the opening of a new entrance in the façade by locals who made it their home [N 15] and which seriously damaged the autobiographical text known as "The Duties of the Vizier" which was on the wall. In addition to its use as a home and stable, there were also water infiltrations, soot from fires, fumes from animals kept there and bat droppings, up to the plastering of entire parts of the walls, which was heavily denounced by Norman de Garis Davies during the surveys carried out between 1906 and 1940.

The location of TT100 was already known to the first visitors to the area and it was used as a dwelling and stable by the locals. The first surveys of the wall paintings were carried out by Robert Hay in 1832, followed by other surveys and copies of the paintings by many other Egyptologists (George Alexander Hoskins, Frédéric Cailliaud, John Gardner Wilkinson, Émile Prisse d'Avennes and others), but only in 1889 was the tomb protected by the addition of an iron door. In 1906, the Metropolitan Museum of New York commissioned complete surveys by Norman and Nina de Garis Davies and the photographer Harry Burton. The work continued until 1940 and resulted in the publication "The tomb of Rekh-mi-Re at Thebes" in two volumes in 1944.

A corridor, which opens onto a courtyard and on whose walls are depicted offertory texts (1 in the plan), gives access to a transversal room; on two superimposed registers (2) the deceased, under whose chair are hidden some geese, inspects five rows of officials, two messengers and some postulants, with texts that explain the functions of the vizier (so-called stele of the "duties of the vizier"), then the collection of taxes and the registration of the products of Upper Egypt are represented, including cattle and gold (which is weighed), as well as monkeys, pigeons, honey and goats. This is followed by (3) autobiographical texts and (4), on five superimposed registers, the so-called tributary processions; not far away (5) the deceased, in his position as vizier, before Thutmose III; the deceased (6) inspects the payment of taxes and the products of Lower Egypt including honey, wheat, gold and men carrying bulls, calves and goats. Next (7) is the deceased who, on five superimposed registers, inspects the temple supplies and workers, the statues of the king, and the funerary furnishings; there are also fragments of scenes of beer preparation and food cooking. Again on five superimposed registers (8) the census of the livestock, the calculation of the harvest, the transport of the grain, the capture of animals, the ploughing, the sowing and the harvest. On one of the short sides (9), and on two registers, the son Menkheperreseneb and, seated, the vizier Amethu, grandfather of the deceased and owner of TT83, and his uncle User, in turn vizier and owner of tomb TT61, both accompanied by their respective wives, in front of the deceased and his wife Meryt also seated; a similar scene follows with the sons Amenhotep, Neferweben and Baki, with their respective wives. There follow (10) scenes of inspection of products from the lands of the Nile Delta with the capture of animals including oryx, wild bulls, ibex, hyenas and chickens, of grape harvesting, fishing and preparation of the catch; fragments (11) of two scenes of the deceased hunting in the desert for wild bulls, hyenas, ostriches, and birds flying on papyrus in a swamp.

A short corridor (12), on the walls of which are sacred and offertory texts, gives access to a long, but not particularly large, room perpendicular to the previous one[N 18]. On the walls: on six superimposed registers (13) the collection and preparation of provisions for the temple of Amun in the presence of the deceased and his assistants; the delivery of rations to the temple servants; the registration of wheat and beans (?); the weighing of beans, the preparation of cakes and the collection of honey; the transport of products from Kharga, Punt and the Delta including wine, papyrus, honey, nuts and monkeys; distribution of ointments and fabrics, Hittite, Syrian and Nubian prisoners, with women and children; bales of fabric; livestock. Not far away (14), on eight superimposed registers, various works in the presence of the deceased and his assistants: vase makers, jewellers, tanners, carpenters, rope makers, blacksmiths, gold weighers, Nubian and Syrian brick makers, sculptors carving colossal statues, stone carriers, cargo ships, men decorating buildings, teams of men, headed by superintendents, recorded by scribes. The following relief (15) develops on ten superimposed registers with the funerary procession (68 distinct episodes are represented), caskets and funerary rites in the garden of Osiris, a procession towards Anubis with the transport of funerary furnishings including statuettes of the king and scenes of the pilgrimage to Abydos with dancers and two purifying priests, rites in front of an altar with the burning of offerings. The following painting (16) represents the sons Menkheperreseneb, Amenhotep and Mery in offerings to the deceased and to his mother Meryt while his son Senusert presents a list of offerings. On the opposite wall (17), on two registers a son, assisted by two relatives, offers flowers to the deceased upon his return from a mission to Het-Sekhem for which he had been entrusted by Amenhotep II; the deceased, assisted by aides, receives officials and petitioners. On eight registers (18) a banquet with daughters offering sistrums and flowers to the deceased and his wife, guests, musicians including male and female players of the lute, tambourine, harp and castanets; followed (19) by rites on the statue of the deceased (for a total of 50 episodes represented), including the transport of the statue by nine priests in the presence of a "sem" priest [N 19]; followed by the preparation of provisions in the presence of the deceased, as well as boats on a lake. On four registers (20) the sons Amenhotep, Senusert and Menkheperreseneb before the deceased and his mother while another brother brings the list of offerings. On the back wall (21) a niche on three registers, the deceased kneeling before Osiris with offertory texts, the son Menkheperreseneb before the deceased and his mother and a false door with texts (today in the Louvre Museum, cat. 042007 06)

The south wing of the transverse hall presents three peculiarities that deserve a special examination: the text of the so-called "duties of the vizier" (No.2 in the plan), that of the "autobiography" (No.3 in the plan) and the representation of the "foreign tributes" (No. 4 in the plan).

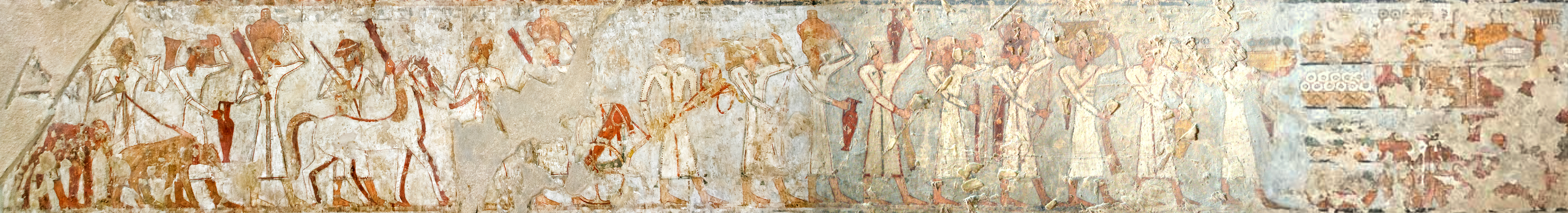
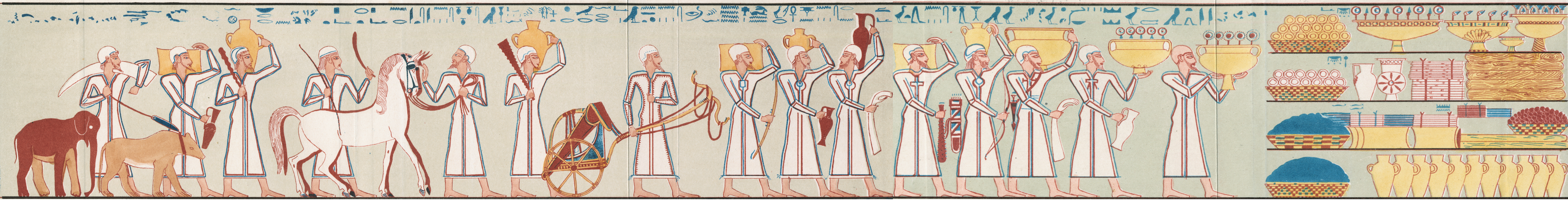
Syrians bringing presents in the tomb of Rekhmire, circa 1400 BCE (actual painting and interpretational drawing)

== The tomb ==
=== Hall ===
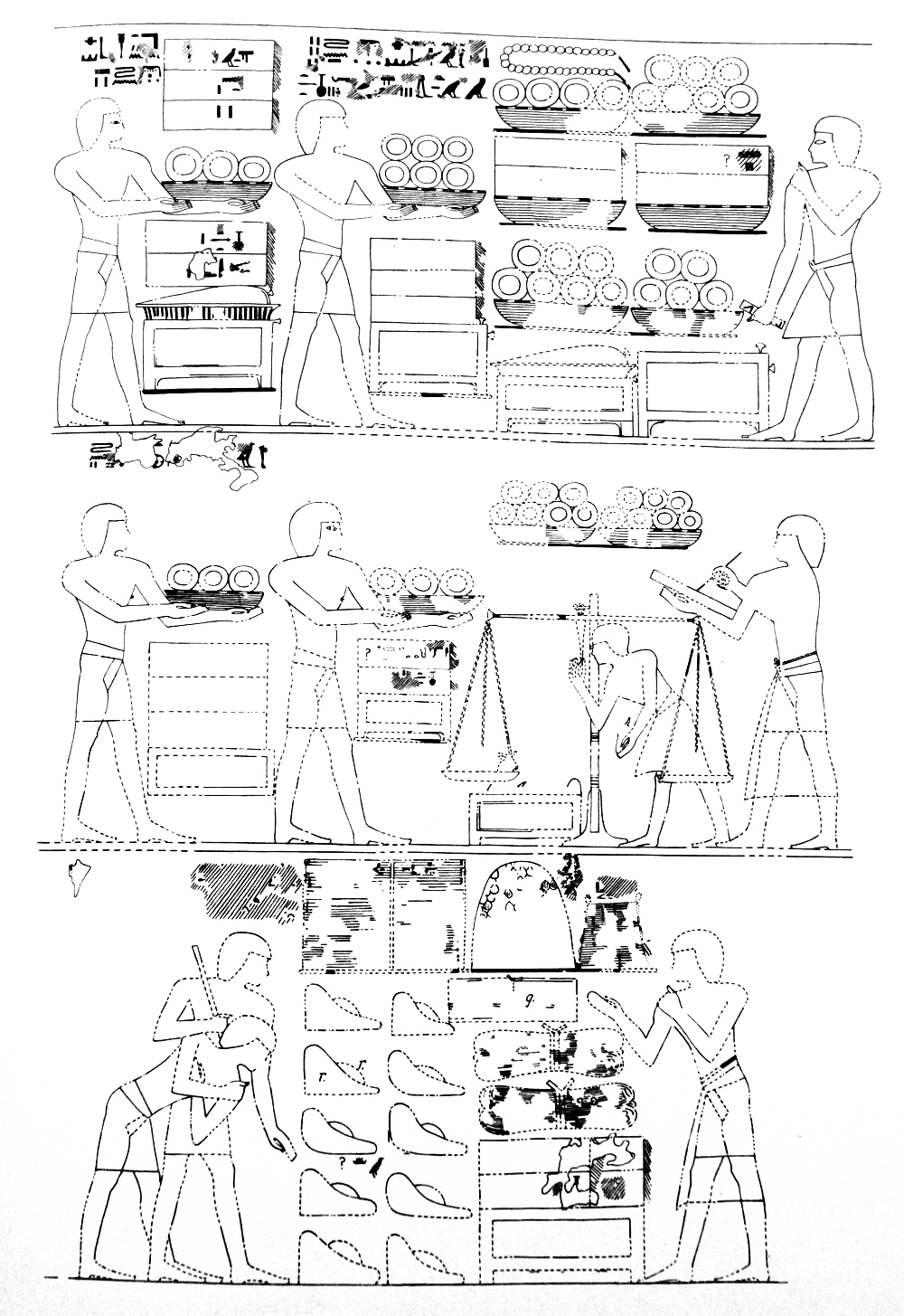
Collecting taxes as depicted in the Hall

Using the labeling in Porter and Moss, there are eleven scenes or combinations of scenes inscribed in the hall of TT100.

1. The lintel and jambs of the entry into the hall show offering scenes.
2. Rekhmire inspects officials and other individuals. The duties of a vizier are recorded in the text. Further scenes show tax collection.
3. Autobiographical text
4. Rekhmire and attendants record foreign tribute including Keftiu offer decorative vases, Nubians are depicted with animals such as leopards, giraffe, cattle and more, the Syrians offer tribute including chariots, horses, a bear and an elephant.
5. Rekhmire's installation as vizier before Thutmose III.
6. Tax collection scenes. Records from Upper Egypt including pigeons, gold, honey and cattle.
7. Rekhmire inspecting temple workshops and provisions. A scene showing royal statues, and baking, cooking and brewing scenes.
8. Rekhmire inspecting cattle and crops and further agricultural scenes.
9. A family group including Rekhmire's son Menkheperresonb, Rekhmire's grandfather the vizier Amethu (TT83) and his uncle, the vizer User (TT61) accompanied by their wives. Another scene includes his son Amenhotep, his son Neferweben and Baki with their respective wives and relatives.
10. Rekhmire performing inspections.
11. A desert hunting and fowling scene.

=== Passage ===
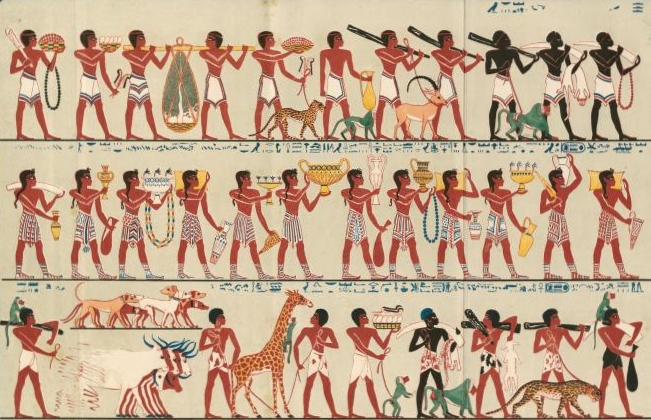
Tribute scene

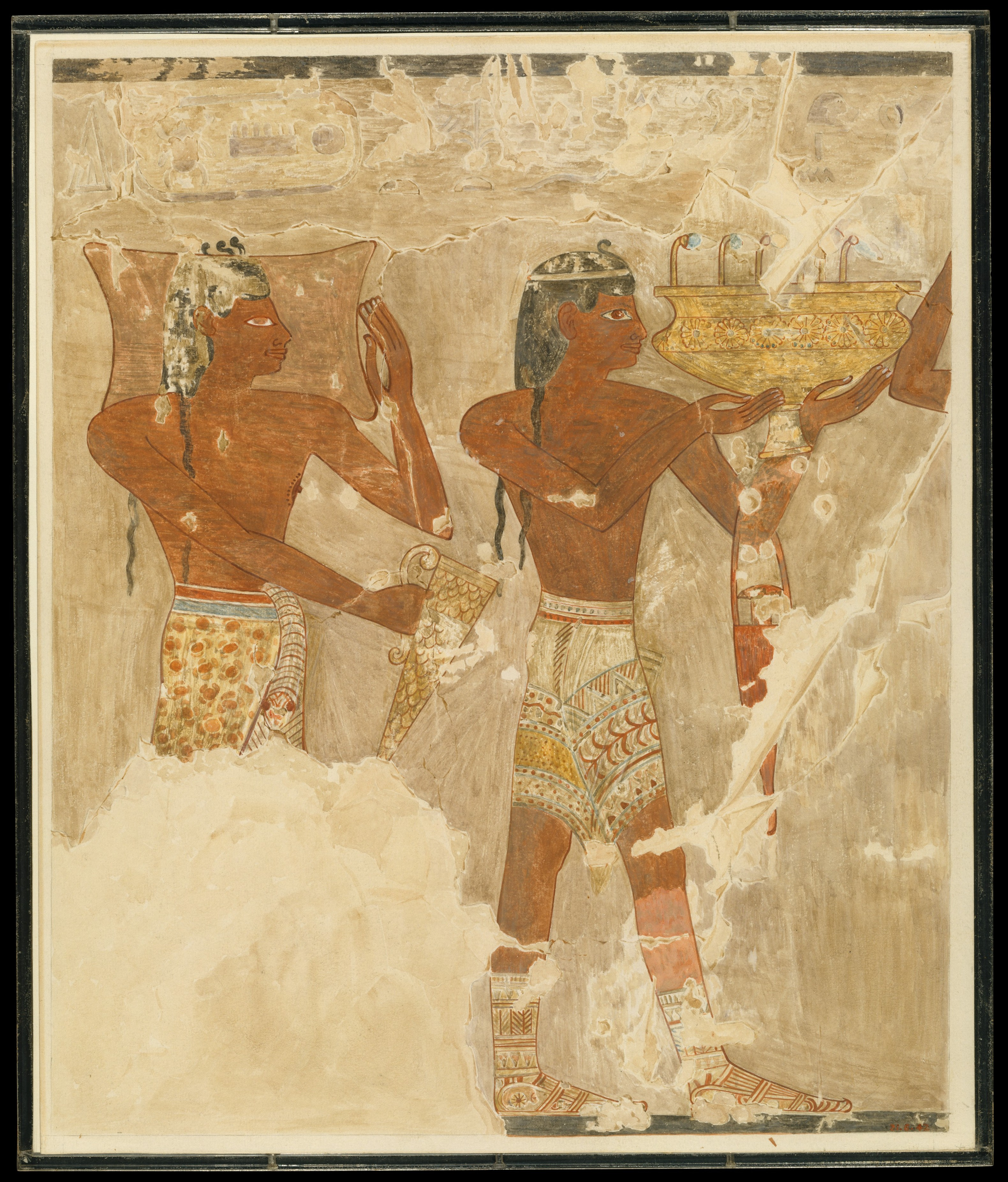
Cretans (Keftiu) bringing gifts to Egypt, in the Tomb of Rekhmire, under Pharaoh Thutmose III (c. 1479–1425) BC

The passage is further decorated with scenes. The numbering follows Porter and Moss.

1. The lintel and jambs of the doorway are inscribed with texts of the deceased.
2. Three registers record the preparation, transportation and storage of temple provisions. A further three registers record the delivery of rations and keeping records of temple serfs.
3. Four registers show industries such as vase and jewelry making, leather working, carpentry and metal work. Another four registers depict temple related work including brick making, hauling stone and carving of colossi, freight ships delivering materials and groups of men with overseers being recorded by scribes.
4. Funeral procession.
5. Sons Menkheperresonb, Mery, Amenhotep and Senusert offering to Rekhmire and his wife Meryt.
6. Sons greeting Rekhmire after his return from acclaiming Amenhotep II
7. Rekhmire with wife, daughters and sons at a banquet.
8. Rites before statues of the deceased Rekhmire and preparation of provisions.
9. Sons Menkheperresonb, Amenhotep and Senusert offering to Rekhmire and his wife Meryt.
10. A niche scenes showing Rekhmire offering to Osiris, Menkheperresonb offering to Rekhmire and Meryt. False doors were present with texts flanking them.

== See also ==
- List of Theban tombs
