= Lyla Pinch Brock =

Canadian egyptologist

- Citizenship: Canadian
- Spouse: Edwin C. Brock
- Scientific career
- Fields: Egyptology

Lyla Pinch Brock is a Canadian Egyptologist, specializing in epigraphy. She lives in Saissac, France.

She has taken part in a number of archaeological projects, including the Tell el-Borg Project and the Theban Mapping Project. On behalf of the Royal Ontario Museum, she was responsible for epigraphy in the tomb of Amenmose (TT89) and wholly responsible for excavating and conserving the tomb of Anen (TT120). She also cleared and conserved KV55 from 1992-1996. During excavation of the tomb in 1993, she discovered an ostracon painted with part of the original plan of the tomb among other objects. The pottery from this job has recently been published.

She was married to Edwin C. Brock, who was also an Egyptologist until his death in 2015.

== Publications ==
- "Egyptology at the Dawn of the Twenty-first Century: Proceedings of the Eighth International Congress of Egyptologists, Cairo, 200". American University in Cairo Press. 2002. (contributor)
- Lyla Pinch Brock & John L. Foster (1998). Shipwrecked Sailor. Cairo: American University in Cairo Press.No. 33, Autumn 2008, pp. 16 – 17.
- Brock, Lyla Pinch. "Art, Industry and the Aegeans in the Tomb of Amenmose." Ägypten und Levante/Egypt and the Levant 10 (2000): 129-137.
- Brock, Lyla Pinch, and Roberta Lawrie Shaw. "The Royal Ontario Museum epigraphic project: Theban tomb 89 preliminary report." Journal of the American Research Center in Egypt 34 (1997): 167-177.
