= TT62 =

Theban tomb

Coordinates: 25.7333°N 32.6000°E

Theban tomb TT62
- Burial site of Amenemwaskhet
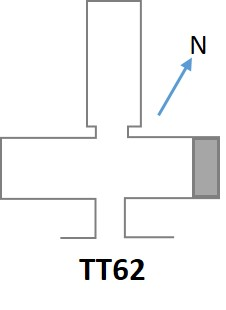

- Location within Egypt
- Location: Sheikh Abd el-Qurna, Theban Necropolis
- ← Previous; TT61 Next → TT63

The Theban Tomb TT62 is located in Sheikh Abd el-Qurna. It forms part of the Theban Necropolis, situated on the west bank of the Nile opposite to Luxor.

The tomb belongs to an 18th Dynasty ancient Egyptian named Amenemwaskhet, who was Overseer of the Cabinet during the reign of Thutmosis III.

== See also ==
- List of Theban tombs
