= Tomb C.7 =

Egyptian tomb in Thebes, Upper Egypt

Theban tomb C.7
- Burial site of Horimose
- Location: Sheikh Abd el-Qurna, Theban Necropolis
- ← Previous; Tomb C.6 Next → Tomb C.8

G5 i ms s
Horimose
in hieroglyphs
Era: New Kingdom
(1550–1069 BC)

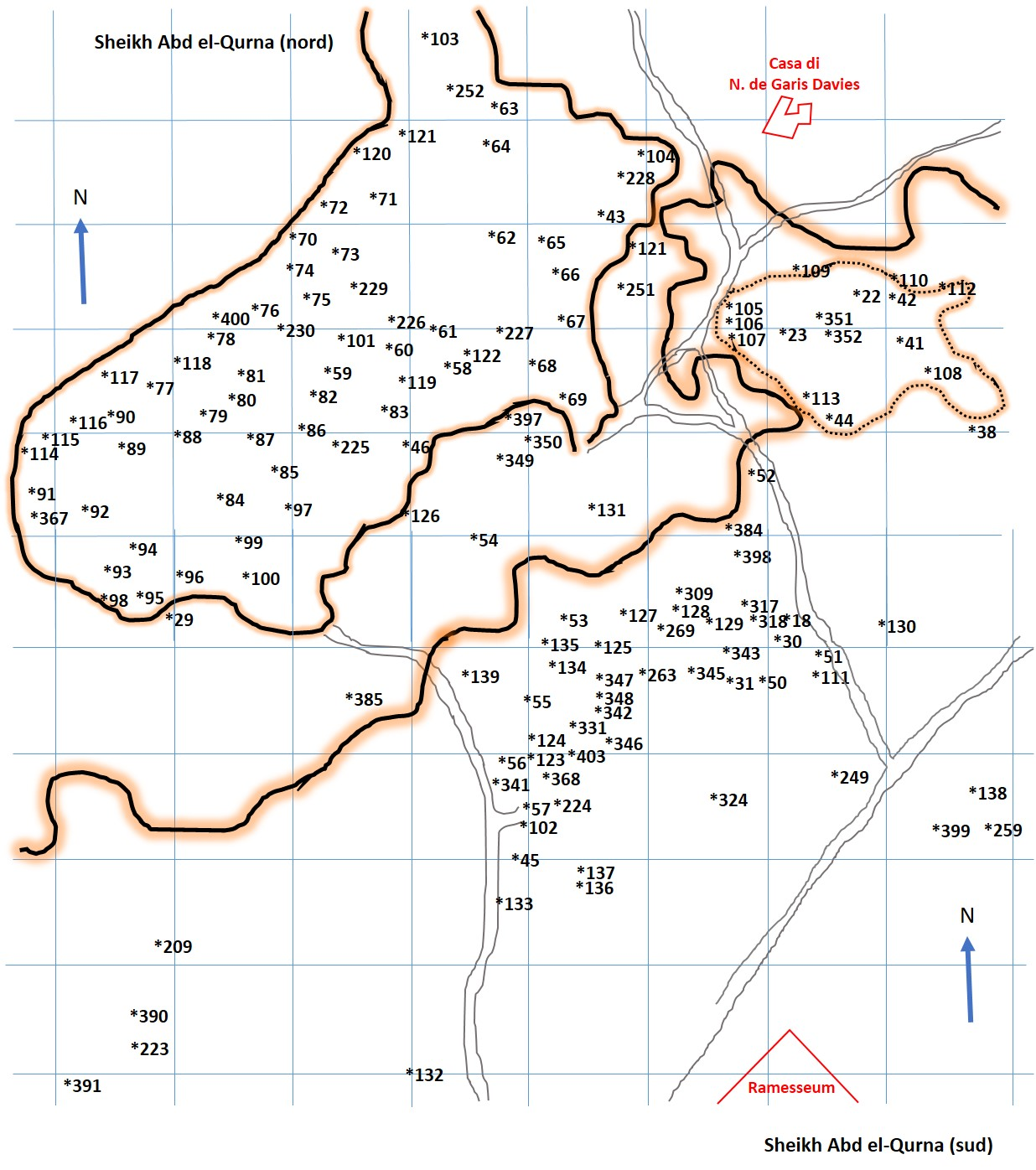
A plan map of the necropolis of Sheikh Abd el-Qurna showing the layout of the area

The Theban Tomb C.7 is an ancient Egyptian tomb in Thebes, Upper Egypt. It is located in Sheikh Abd el-Qurna, part of the Theban Necropolis on the west bank of the Nile opposite Luxor. It is the burial place of the ancient Egyptian Horimose (Harmosi), who was the Head custodian of the treasury in the King's Mansion on the West of Thebes (the Ramesseum). Horimose, his wife Mutemwia, and a son named Kaemwaset are named in scenes in the Hall of the tomb. One of the scenes shows a row of kings including: Horemheb, Amenhotep III, Thutmosis IV, Amenhotep II, Thutmosis III, Thutmosis II and Thutmosis I.

== See also ==
- List of Theban Tombs
