= TT137 =

Theban tomb

Coordinates: 25.7333°N 32.6000°E

Theban tomb TT137
- Burial site of Mose
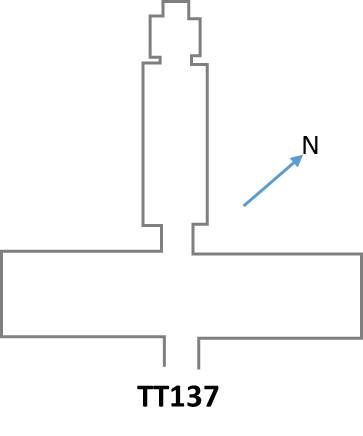

- Location within Egypt
- Location: Sheikh Abd el-Qurna, Theban Necropolis
- ← Previous; TT136 Next → TT138

ms
Mose
in hieroglyphs
Era: New Kingdom
(1550–1069 BC)

The Theban Tomb TT137 is located in Sheikh Abd el-Qurna. It forms part of the Theban Necropolis, situated on the west bank of the Nile opposite Luxor.

The tomb belongs to a 19th Dynasty ancient Egyptian named Mose, who was Head of the works of the Lord of the Two Lands in every monument of Amun during the reign of Ramesses II. Mose's wife was named Takharu.

The tomb has an inscribed passageway. Mose appears before a cartouche of Ramesses II. A funerary cone records the names of Mose's parents. His father Bak was a dignitary (and head of the Works in the Place of Eternity), and his mother's name was Tekhu.

== See also ==
- List of Theban tombs
