= TT88 =

Theban tomb

Theban tomb TT88
- Burial site of Pehsukher
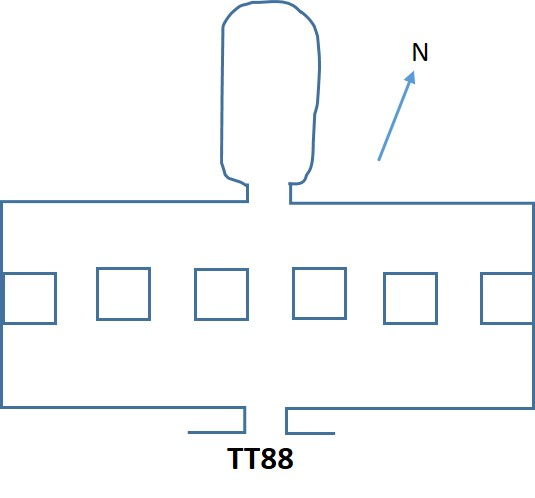

- Location within Egypt
- Location: Sheikh Abd el-Qurna, Theban Necropolis
- ← Previous; TT85 Next → TT89

The Theban Tomb TT88 is located in Sheikh Abd el-Qurna and is part of the Theban Necropolis, on the west bank of the Nile, opposite to Luxor. It is the burial place of the ancient Egyptian military official Pehsukher who lived in the 18th Dynasty. The monument is known to researchers since the beginning of the 19th century, but only received in 2023 a full publication.

== Family ==
Pehsukher, with the second name Tjenenu was deputy of the king in the great army. He is known from several sources, including a statue now in the Louvre (E 25985) His wife was called Neith. Several other people are depicted in his tomb, but it is uncertain how they relate to the couple.

== Tomb ==
The tomb of Pehsukher consists of a decorated tomb chapel and a staircase going down to the burial chamber. The burial chamber was found looted. The chapel was once decorated with paintings but they are now much destroyed. The chapel consist of a broad hall with four pillars and a long, undecorated hall behind it. Still preserved scenes in the tomb chapel include farmers working on the field and depictions of store houses. Pehsukher and his wife are making offerings and sitting in front of a table full of offerings. On one wall, there is a long, mostly religious text. Only parts of the pillars are decorated. They show most often Pehsukher sitting and other people bringing offerings.

== See also ==
- List of Theban tombs

== Literature ==
- Heike Heye (2023). Die Gräber des Amenemhab und des Pehsucher, Theben Nr. 85 und 88: die Dekoration der Innenräume. Mit einem Beitrag von Eva Hofmann. Photographs by Dieter Johannes and Peter Windszus. Archäologische Veröffentlichungen, Deutsches Archäologisches Institut, Abteilung Kairo 138. Wiesbaden: Harrassowitz, ISBN 978-3-447-12041-8
