= TT138 =

Theban tomb

Coordinates: 25.7333°N 32.6000°E

Theban tomb TT138
- Burial site of Nedjemger
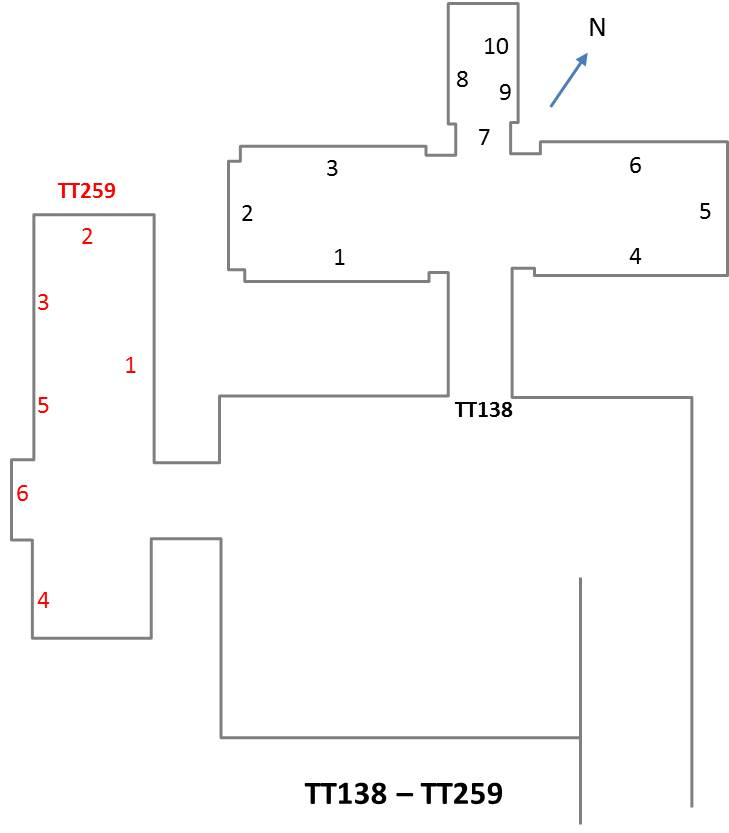

- Location within Egypt
- Location: Sheikh Abd el-Qurna, Theban Necropolis
- ← Previous; TT137 Next → TT139

M29 M Y1 g r
Nedjemger
in hieroglyphs
Era: New Kingdom
(1550–1069 BC)

The Theban Tomb TT138 is located in Sheikh Abd el-Qurna, part of the Theban Necropolis, on the west bank of the Nile, opposite to Luxor.

The tomb belongs to a 19th Dynasty ancient Egyptian named Nedjemger, who was Overseer of the garden in the Ramesseum in the estate of Amun during the reign of Ramesses II. Nedjemger's wife was named Nausha (or Nesha). Nausha(at) is a chantress of Amun-re, King of the Gods.

== The tomb ==
The tomb has an inscribed hall and inner chamber.
In the hall we see:

- Book of Gates
- Funeral Procession
- The Garden of the Ramesseum with shaduf and pylon.
- Nedjemger and family offering to the King and Horus
- The tree-goddess with Nedjemger and his wife
- Nedjemger and family before Osiris. A son named Tjauenhuy appears in the scene with his parents.

In the inner chamber there are:

- texts inscribed on the jambs
- Nedjemger and family appearing before Osiris, Isis, Nephtys and Anubis. Nedjemger and Nausha are accompanied by their daughter Baketmut and their son Hori, who is a draughtsman in the estate of Amun.
- Nedjemger and wife in a weighing scene with Thoth writing, and Nedjemger led before Osiris by Harsiesi.

== See also ==
- List of Theban tombs
