= Tomb C.8 =

Theban tomb

Theban tomb C.8
- Burial site of Nakht
- Location: Sheikh Abd el-Qurna, Theban Necropolis
- ← Previous; Tomb C.7 Next → Tomb C.9

n M3 Aa1 t D40
Nakht
in hieroglyphs
Era: New Kingdom
(1550–1069 BC)

The Theban Tomb C.8 is an ancient Egyptian tomb in Thebes, Upper Egypt. It is located in Sheikh Abd el-Qurna, part of the Theban Necropolis on the west bank of the Nile opposite Luxor. It is the burial place of the ancient Egyptian Nakht, who was the Overseer of the fowl-houses in the Estate of Amun.

The tomb shows the deceased bringing and recording geese, fowling, and netting and preparing fowl. Nakht is accompanied by his wife Irtnefert. A limestone door lintel from the tomb is today in the Petrie Museum of Egyptian Archaeology.

== See also ==
- List of Theban Tombs
