= TT85 =

Theban tomb

Theban tomb TT85
- Burial site of Amenemhab/Mahu
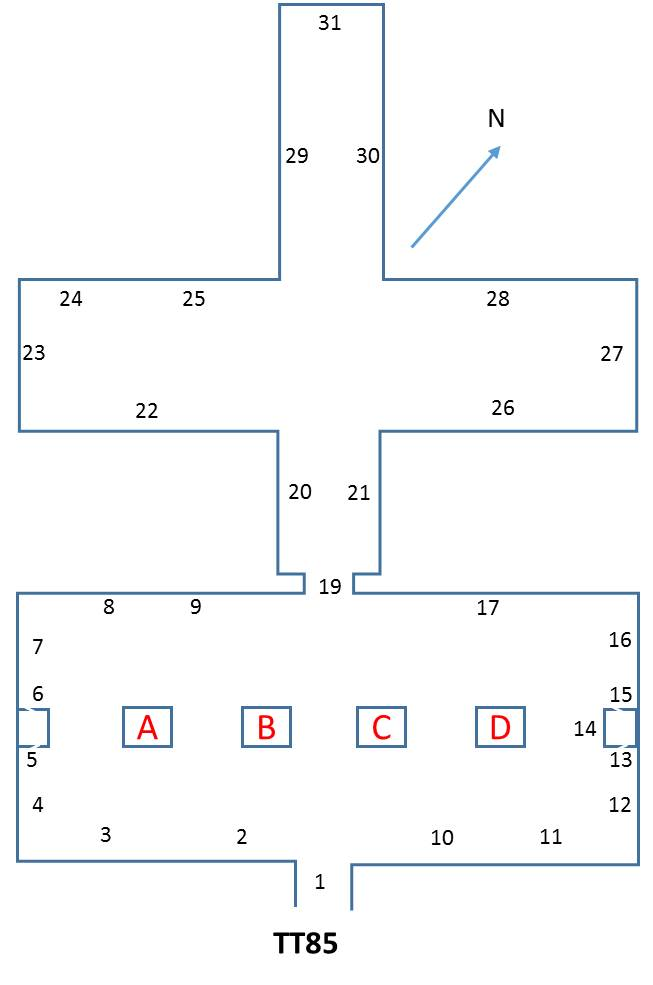

- Location within Egypt
- Location: Sheikh Abd el-Qurna, Theban Necropolis
- ← Previous; TT83 Next → TT88

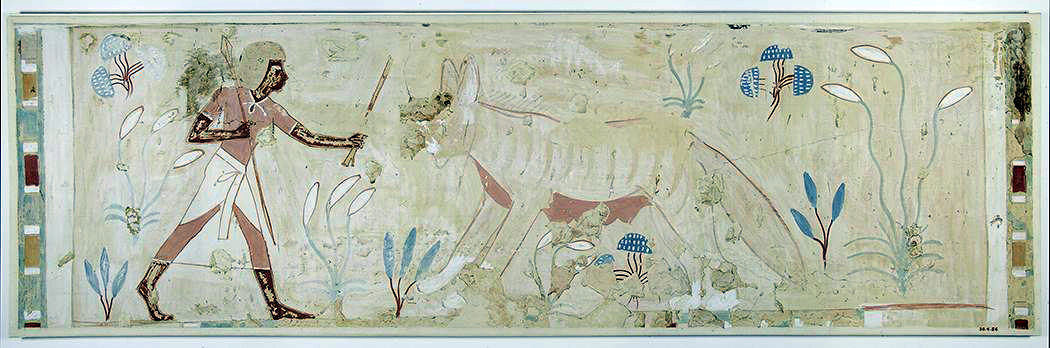
Amenemhab hunting and in front of a hyena

The Theban Tomb TT85 is located in Sheikh Abd el-Qurna and is part of the Theban Necropolis, on the west bank of the Nile, opposite to Luxor. It is the burial place of the ancient Egyptian official Amenemhab, also called Mahu (that is a short version of his name) who lived in the 18th Dynasty.

== Family ==
Amenemhab bears several military titles, that include overseer of the troops of the lord of the two lands (lord of the two Lands is the Egyptian king), deputy of the king in the big army and head of the bowmen. His wife was a lady called Baki. Several children are known. They include the sons Iamu and Meri and the daughter Nebet-nehet.

== Tomb ==
The tomb complex consists of a decorated tomb chapel, carved into the Theban rocks and the underground, undecorated burial chambers, that were found looted. The funerary chapel consists of two broad halls, the first one with four pillars. There is a long corridor at the end leading to a statue niche.

The chapel was once fully decorated with paintings, but they are today much destroyed. The scenes are showing events from the life of Amenemhab, but also religious scenes connected to the Underworld. On the right North wall of the first hall, there is Amenemhab shown in front of king Thutmose III. Much of the scene is destroyed, but in the upper half is a long biographical inscription and on the very right side appear many Syrians bringing gifts to the king. The biographical inscription reports how Amenemhab went with king Thutmose III on his Syrian campaign to conquer those regions. While the king was hunting there, an elephant attacked Thutmose III and Amenemhab proudly reports how he killed the elephant and saved the king's life. On the left of the North wall, there was once a similar scene, but only a few figures are preserved. A remarkable scene appears on the lintel between the two middle pillars. Here Amenemhab is shown hunting, in front of a big hyena.

In the second hall appear scenes connected with funerary rituals. On left short end, the underworld god Osiris is shown, while on the opposite short end, Amenemhab is shown on a boat and hunting in the marshes. Another scene, on the right North wall shows a big banquet with several rows of guests and musicians.

On the left wall of the inner corridor is shown the burial procession, with the coffin and mummy of Amenemhab and many priests and offerings. The opposite wall of the corridor shows Amenemhab and his wife in front of a garden and in front of people bringing offerings.

== See also ==
- List of Theban tombs

== Literature ==
- Heike Heye (2023). Die Gräber des Amenemhab und des Pehsucher, Theben Nr. 85 und 88: die Dekoration der Innenräume. Mit einem Beitrag von Eva Hofmann. Photographs by Dieter Johannes and Peter Windszus. Archäologische Veröffentlichungen, Deutsches Archäologisches Institut, Abteilung Kairo 138. Wiesbaden: Harrassowitz, ISBN 978-3-447-12041-8
