= Edwin C. Brock =

American Egyptologist (1946 - 2015)

Edwin C. Brock (April 20, 1946 – September 22, 2015) was an American Egyptologist, who worked for the Theban Mapping Project at the American University in Cairo. He worked on royal sarcophagi in the Valley of the Kings. He also worked in the tombs of Merenptah (KV8) and Amenmeses (KV10), along with Otto Schaden and the Theban Mapping Project (of which he was a member from 1997 to 2004). He was the co-director of the Amenmesse Tomb Project, which in February 2006 announced the discovery of KV63. He also supervised archaeological salvage work in Luxor as part of the wastewater project there.

Brock was married to Canadian Egyptologist Lyla Pinch Brock. He died in Cairo on 22 September 2015, at the age of 69.

He was the author of The Temples of Abu Simbel: An Illustrated Guide. The Houses of Ramesses & Nefertary. ISBN 977-5089-66-2, The Palm Press, 2006.
