= TT44 =

Theban tomb

Coordinates: 25.7333°N 32.6000°E

Theban tomb TT44
- Burial site of Amenemhab
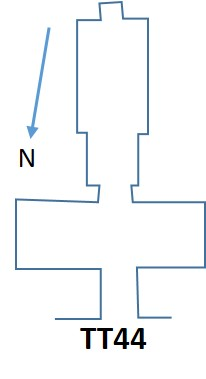

- Location within Egypt
- Location: Sheikh Abd el-Qurna, Theban Necropolis
- ← Previous; TT43 Next → TT45

i mn n M H b W3
Amenemhab
in hieroglyphs
Era: New Kingdom
(1550–1069 BC)

The Theban Tomb TT44 is located in Sheikh Abd el-Qurna. It forms part of the Theban Necropolis, on the west bank of the Nile opposite Luxor. The tomb is the burial place of the ancient Egyptian Amenemhab, whose title was wab-priest in front of Amun. He dates to the Ramesside Period.

== See also ==
- List of Theban tombs
