= TT43 =

Theban tomb

Coordinates: 25.7333°N 32.6000°E

Theban tomb TT43
- Burial site of Neferronpet
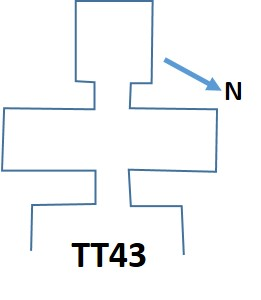

- Location within Egypt
- Location: Sheikh Abd el-Qurna, Theban Necropolis
- ← Previous; TT42 Next → TT44

F35 M4
Neferronpet
in hieroglyphs
Era: New Kingdom
(1550–1069 BC)

The Theban Tomb TT43 is located in Sheikh Abd el-Qurna, part of the Theban Necropolis, on the west bank of the Nile, opposite to Luxor. It is the burial place of the ancient Egyptian Neferronpet, whose title was Overseer of the kitchen of the Lord of the Two Lands. He dates to the time of Amenhotep II from the Eighteenth Dynasty of Egypt, and his tomb was built at the time of Amenhotep III. It is an unfinished tomb, so there are only some wall paintings and most are not finished and it is only in one room. It is an incredibly small tomb in Egypt.

== See also ==
- List of Theban tombs
