= TT61 =

Theban tomb

Coordinates: 25.7333°N 32.6000°E

Theban tomb TT61
- Burial site of Useramen
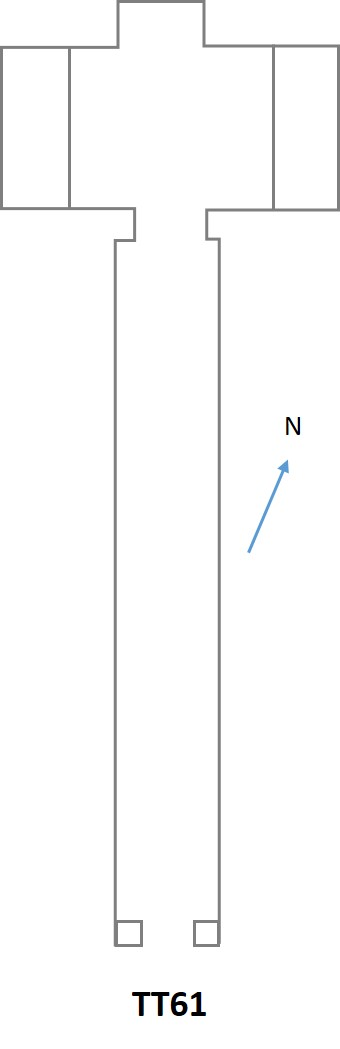

- Location within Egypt
- Location: Sheikh Abd el-Qurna, Theban Necropolis
- ← Previous; TT60 Next → TT62

The Theban Tomb TT61 is located in Sheikh Abd el-Qurna. It forms part of the Theban Necropolis, situated on the west bank of the Nile opposite to Luxor.

The tomb belongs to an 18th Dynasty ancient Egyptian named Useramen, who was a Vizier during the reigns of Hatshepsut and Thutmosis III.

== See also ==
- List of Theban tombs
