= Hunefer (mayor) =

Mayor of Thebes under King Ramses II. and Merenptah

Hunefer was an ancient Egyptian official under kings Ramses II and Merenptah in the 19th Dynasty around 1225 BC. Hunefer is mainly known from his Theban tomb TT385. Here is also shown his wife Nehty. Hunefer held the title of mayor and was most likely the son of the Mayor of Thebes Paser and his wife Tuia. Hunefer is also known from several documents and letters that make it likely that he was still in office under king Merenptah. His huge granite sarcophagus is today at the Fitzwilliam Museum in Cambridge.
