= TT172 =

Theban tomb

Theban tomb TT172
- Burial site of Mentiywy
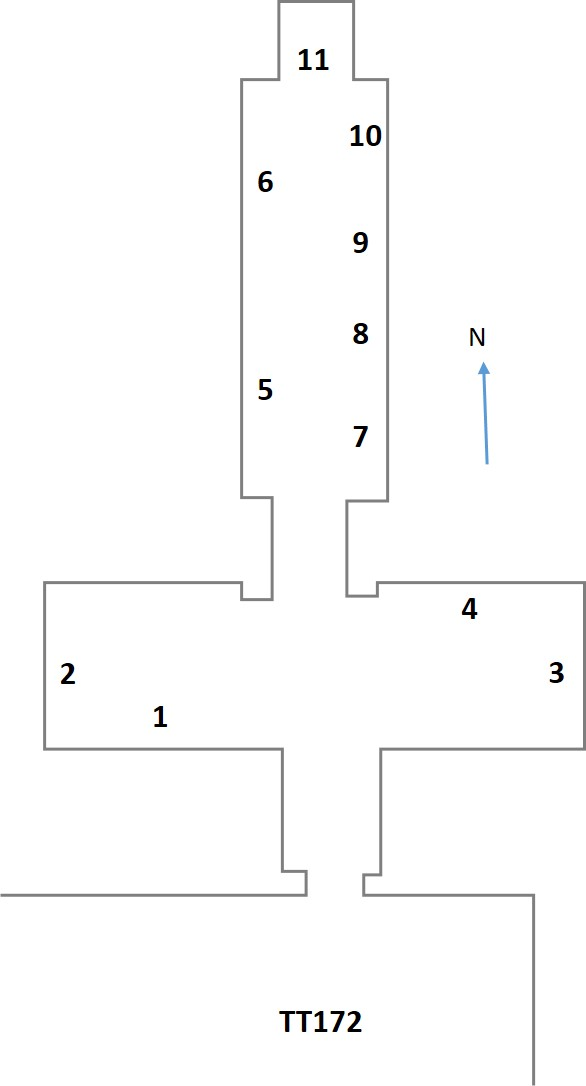

- Location within Egypt
- Location: El-Khokha, Theban Necropolis
- ← Previous; TT171 Next → TT173

mn n T w i Z4 D54 w Z4
Mentiywy
in hieroglyphs
Era: New Kingdom
(1550–1069 BC)

The Theban Tomb TT172 is located in El-Khokha, part of the Theban Necropolis, on the west bank of the Nile, opposite to Luxor.

TT172 was the burial place of the ancient Egyptian named Mentiywy (also written as Montu-iywy), who was a royal butler and a child of the kap (nursery). Mentiywy lived during the reigns of Tuthmosis III and Amenhotep II during the middle of the Eighteenth Dynasty of Egypt. His mother was named Hepu.

== Tomb ==
The tomb consists of a hall and a passage which are both decorated and inscribed. The hall contains offering scenes and an autobiographical text. In the text Mentiywy describes how he served under Tuthmosis III. He started out his career as a servant in the royal apartments, and later accompanied the king on his campaign. The text makes clear that he followed the king to the middle east and crossed the Euphrates. Mentiywy states that he never strayed from the king's side on the battlefield. When Amenhotep II followed his father on the throne, Mentiywy stayed on at the royal palace and served as a royal butler.

== See also ==
- List of Theban tombs
