= TT89 =

Theban tomb

Theban tomb TT89
- Burial site of Amenmose
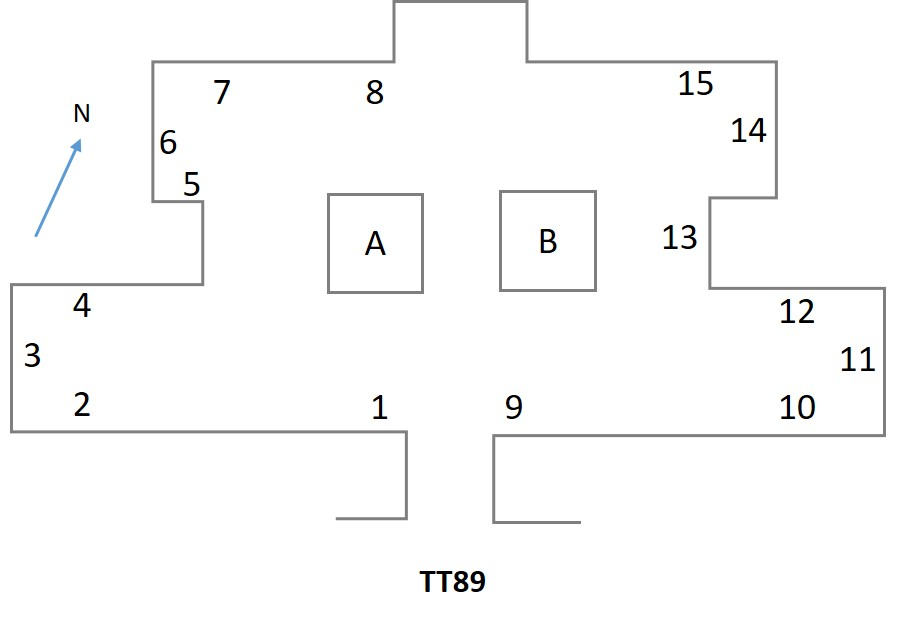

- Location within Egypt
- Location: Sheikh Abd el-Qurna, Theban Necropolis
- ← Previous; TT88 Next → TT93

The Theban Tomb TT89 is located in Sheikh Abd el-Qurna, part of the Theban Necropolis, on the west bank of the Nile, opposite to Luxor. It is the burial place of the ancient Egyptian Amenmose, who was Steward in the Southern City during the reign of Amenhotep III, in the 18th Dynasty.

The tomb was started during the reign of Thutmose III. A scene on one of the pillars shows Amenmose with the feather symbolizing his office held out to the king who shown seated in a kiosk. The figure of Amenmose had been out. The king holds a hekat-scepter and an ankh. Elsewhere in the tomb is a depiction of king Amenhotep III. The king is seated in a kiosk and the goddess Hathor is seated behind him. Instead of Amenmose, an ankh-shaped fanbearer presents his fan to the king. Another scene depicting Amenhotep III is thought to have decorated the other side of the niche by which the first scene appears. The outline of Amenmose and possibly his son can still be made out before what would have been another depiction of the king. From the decorations it appears that Amenmose started his career under king Thutmose III and served until approximately the middle of Amenhotep III's reign.

== See also ==
- List of Theban tombs
