= TT171 =

Theban tomb

Theban tomb TT171
- Burial site of Unknown
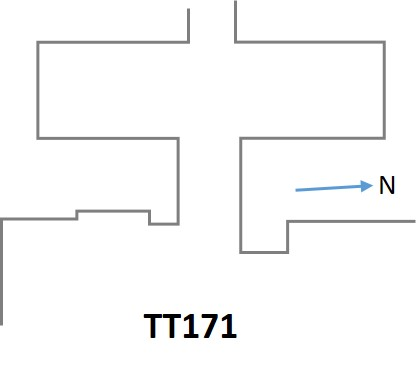

- Location within Egypt
- Location: Sheikh Abd el-Qurna, Theban Necropolis
- ← Previous; TT170 Next → TT172

The Theban Tomb TT171 is located in Sheikh Abd el-Qurna, part of the Theban Necropolis, on the west bank of the Nile, opposite to Luxor. The name of the owner is not known. His wife was named Isis (Aset) according to an inscription on the facade. The tomb dates to the Eighteenth Dynasty of Egypt.

== See also ==
- List of Theban tombs
