= TT170 =

Theban tomb

Theban tomb TT170
- Burial site of Nebmehyt
- Location within Egypt
- Location: Sheikh Abd el-Qurna, Theban Necropolis
- ← Previous; TT169 Next → TT171

nb V22 H i i P5 V1 Z2
Nebmehyt
in hieroglyphs
Era: New Kingdom
(1550–1069 BC)

The Theban Tomb TT170 is located in Sheikh Abd el-Qurna, part of the Theban Necropolis, on the west bank of the Nile, opposite to Luxor. It is the burial place of the ancient Egyptian Nebmehyt, who was a scribe of recruits of the Ramesseum in the Estate of Amun during the reign of Ramesses II in the Nineteenth Dynasty.

== See also ==
- List of Theban tombs
