= Neferweben =

Ancient Egyptian vizier

- Vizier of the North
Egyptian name
nfr N8 A52
- Dynasty: 18th Dynasty
- Pharaoh: Thutmose III
- Spouse: Bet(au)
- Father: Amethu called Ahmose
- Mother: Ta-Amenthu
- Children: Rekhmire

Nebweben was an ancient Egyptian vizier of the North under pharaoh Thutmose III of the 18th Dynasty.

== Family ==
Neferweben was the son of vizier Amethu called Ahmose, who served during the reign of Thutmose II and the early years of the combined reigns of Hatshepsut and Thutmose III. He was the brother of vizier Useramen and the father of vizier Rekhmire. Useramen is last attested in year 28 of Thutmose III, while Rekhmire is first attested as vizier in year 32. According to an older hypothesis Neferweben served as vizier in the intervening years. However, his canopic jar was found in Saqqara where he was most likely buried. The burial place indicates that he was a vizier with his office in the northern part of the country (during the New Kingdom the vizierate was divided into Upper (South) and Lower Egypt (North)).

Amethu called Ahmose (Vizier)
Useramen (Vizier)	Neferweben	Bet(au) (wife)
Rekhmire (Vizier)

== Vizier ==
The vizier Neferweben is known from two canopic jars found in Saqqara. The two jars are part of the Nugent collection (originally belonging to George Nugent-Grenville, 2nd Baron Nugent). One of the jars has an inscription dedicated to Neith and Duamutef, while the other mentions Serket and Qebehsenuef.

The Boston Museum of Fine Arts has a small red granite statue (29.728) inscribed for Neferweben.
