= TT45 =

Theban tomb

Coordinates: 25.7333°N 32.6000°E

Theban tomb TT45
- Burial site of Thoth and Thothemheb
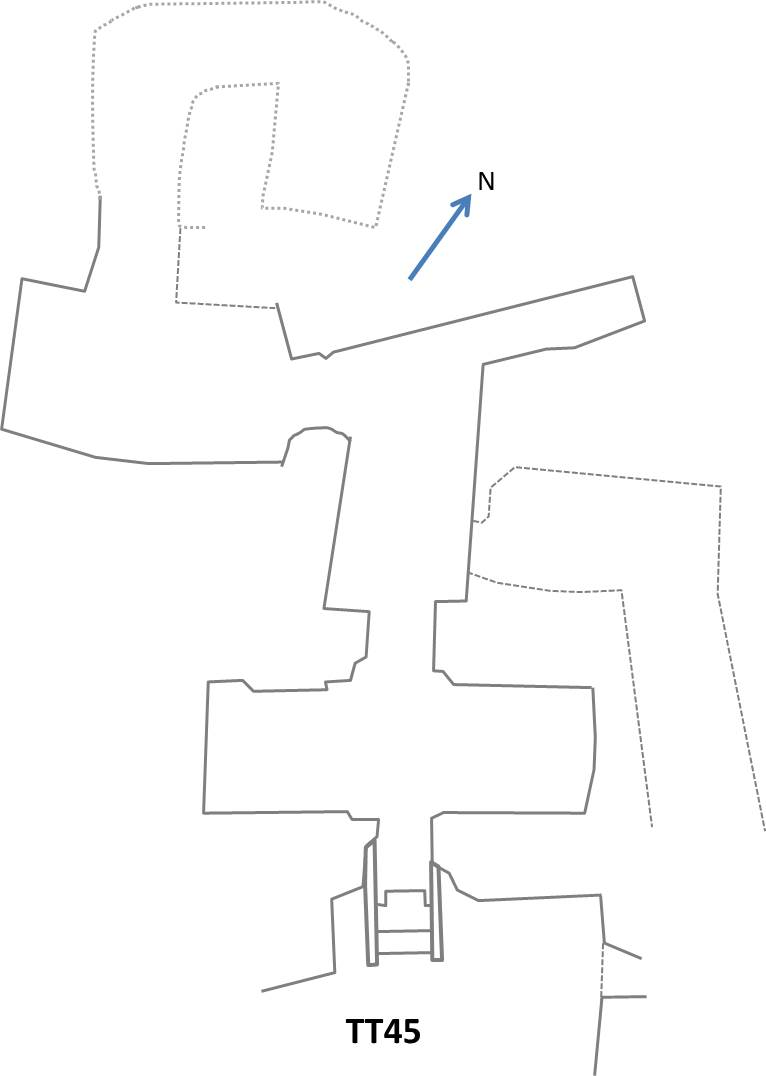

- Location within Egypt
- Location: Sheikh Abd el-Qurna, Theban Necropolis
- ← Previous; TT44 Next → TT46

G26 t Z4
Djehuty
in hieroglyphs
Era: New Kingdom
(1550–1069 BC)

G26 t Z4 M W3
Djehutyemheb
in hieroglyphs
Era: New Kingdom
(1550–1069 BC)

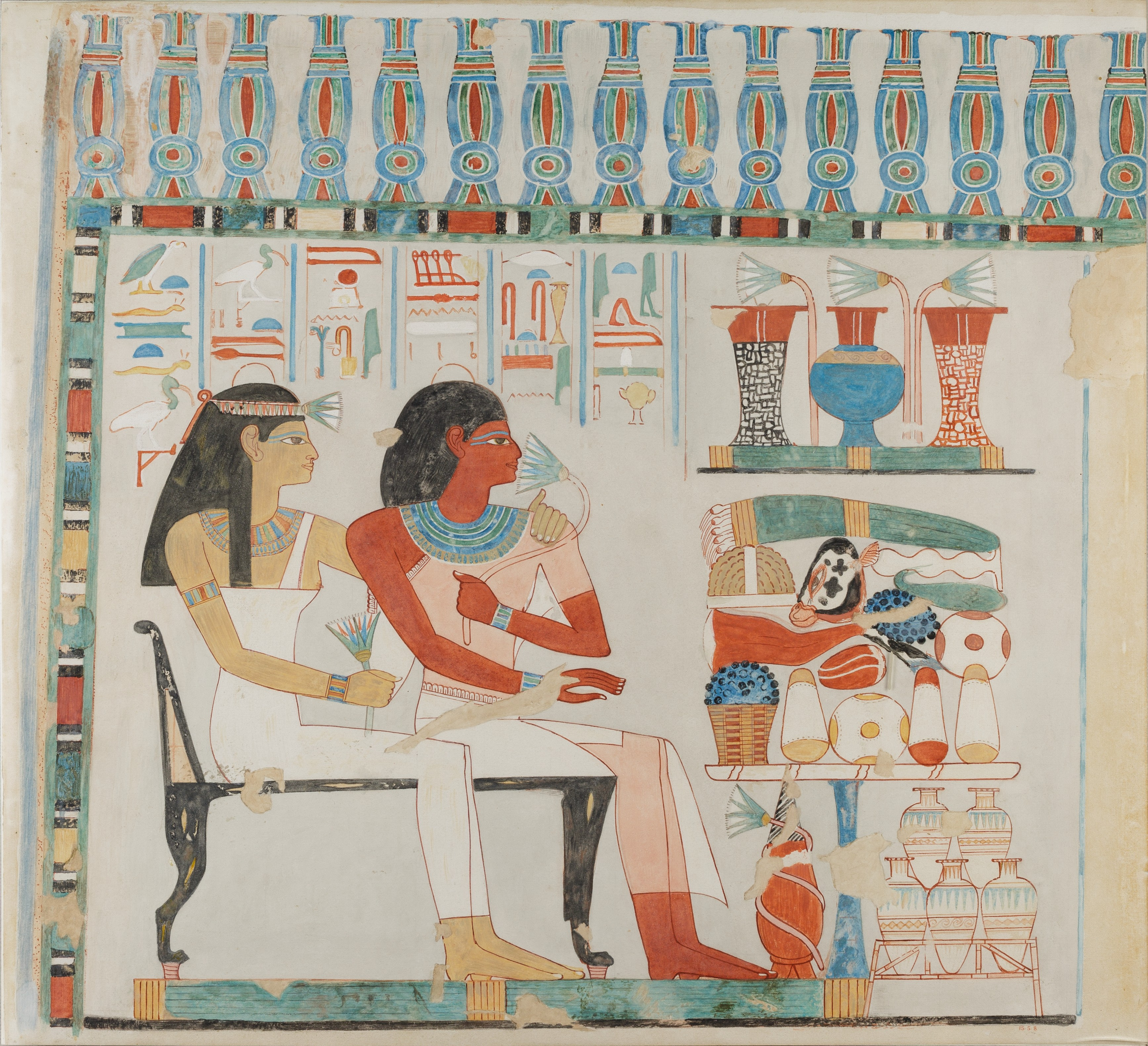
Djehuty and his mother receiving offerings, paintings of the Tomb of Djehuty (MET 15.5.8)

The Theban Tomb TT45 is located in Sheikh Abd el-Qurna, part of the Theban Necropolis, on the west bank of the Nile, opposite modern Luxor. It was originally the burial place of the ancient Egyptian named Djehuty (Thoth), who was a scribe of the offering-table of Mery, high-priest of Amun, head of all the weavers of Amun, and steward of Mery, high priest of Amun. Djehuty lived during the reign of Amenhotep II (c. 1400 BCE; Eighteenth Dynasty of Egypt). He was the son of a lady also named Djehuty.

The tomb was reused several hundred years later, in the Ramesside Period, by a man named Djehutyemheb (Thothemheb). He was head of the makers of fine linen of the temple of Amun. Djehutyemheb was the son of the head of the weavers named Wennefer and his wife Isis. Djehutyemheb's wife was named Bak-Khonsu. She was a songstress of Amun.

In the tomb, Djehutyemheb and his wife Bak-Khonsu are depicted with their sons, who offer them bread, beer, oxen, fowl, wine, fruit, and incense. The sons are named Panakhtenopet (scribe of the treasury in the temple of Amun), Userhatnakht (scribe of fine linen in the temple of Amun), Wennefer and Panesuttawy. The first two sons work for the temple of Amun, just like their father and grandfather. In other scenes, more relatives are mentioned. Djehutyemheb and Bak-Khonsu have daughters named Tyemheb, Nakhtmut, Hennuttawy, Wernefret, and Isetnefret. Grandsons by the name of Amenemopenakht, Panebenopet, Suti called Khonsuenwia, and granddaughters named Irneferumut, Akhmut, Isis, and Dinymuti are mentioned. The daughters and granddaughters are songstresses of Amun.

In 2017, the Leiden University Mission to the Theban Necropolis started work in Theban Tomb 45 under the direction of Dr. Carina van den Hoven, with the support of the Gerda Henkel Stiftung. The international team carries out conservation, documentation, publication, art historical analysis, heritage preservation and site management activities in TT45. A full archaeological study of the tomb is carried out in order to enhance our understanding of the history of use of the tomb. The acquired data are documented and published using the most recent non-invasive digital tools and developments in the field of Digital Humanities, such as photogrammetry, digital epigraphy, digital reconstruction, and digital imaging technology.

== See also ==
- List of Theban tombs
