= TT38 =

Theban tomb

Coordinates: 25.7333°N 32.6000°E

Theban tomb TT38
- Burial site of Djeserkaraseneb
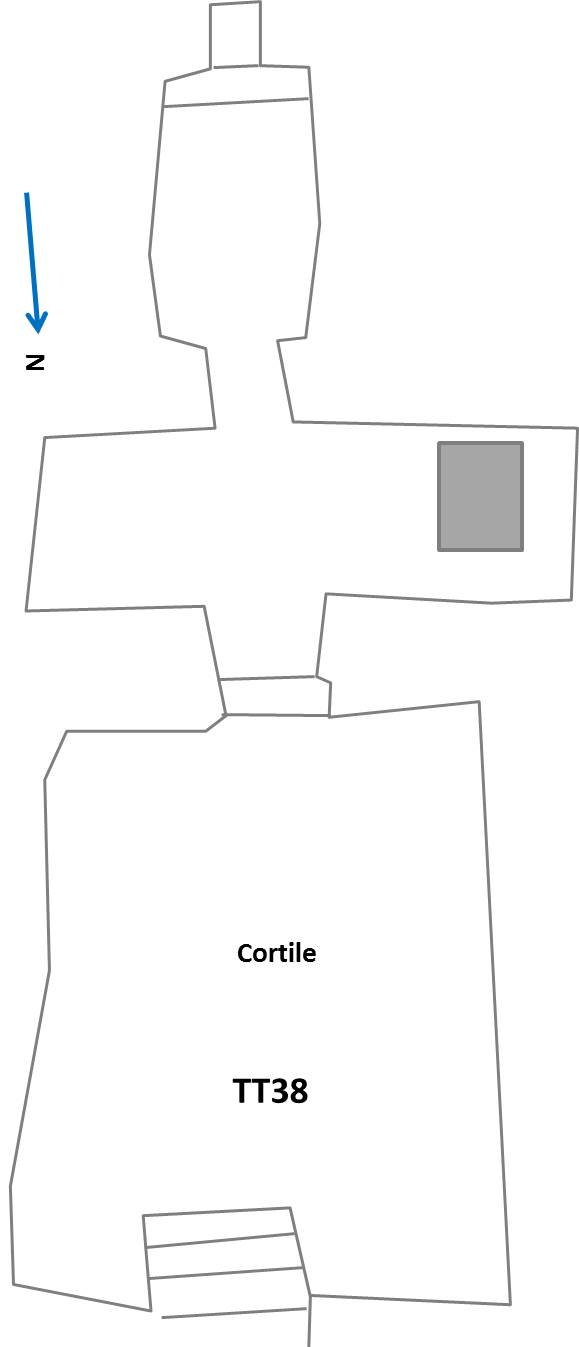
- Scenes from TT38

- Location within Egypt
- Location: Sheikh Abd el-Qurna, Theban Necropolis
- Discovered: 18th dynasty
- ← Previous; TT37 Next → TT39

N5 D44 D28 s n b
Djeserkareseneb
in hieroglyphs
Era: New Kingdom
(1550–1069 BC)

The Theban Tomb TT38 is located in Sheikh Abd el-Qurna, part of the Theban Necropolis, on the west bank of the Nile, opposite to Luxor. It is the burial place of the ancient Egyptian official Djeserkaraseneb (who was Scribe and Counter of the Grain in the Granary of Amun during the reign of Thutmose IV) and his family.

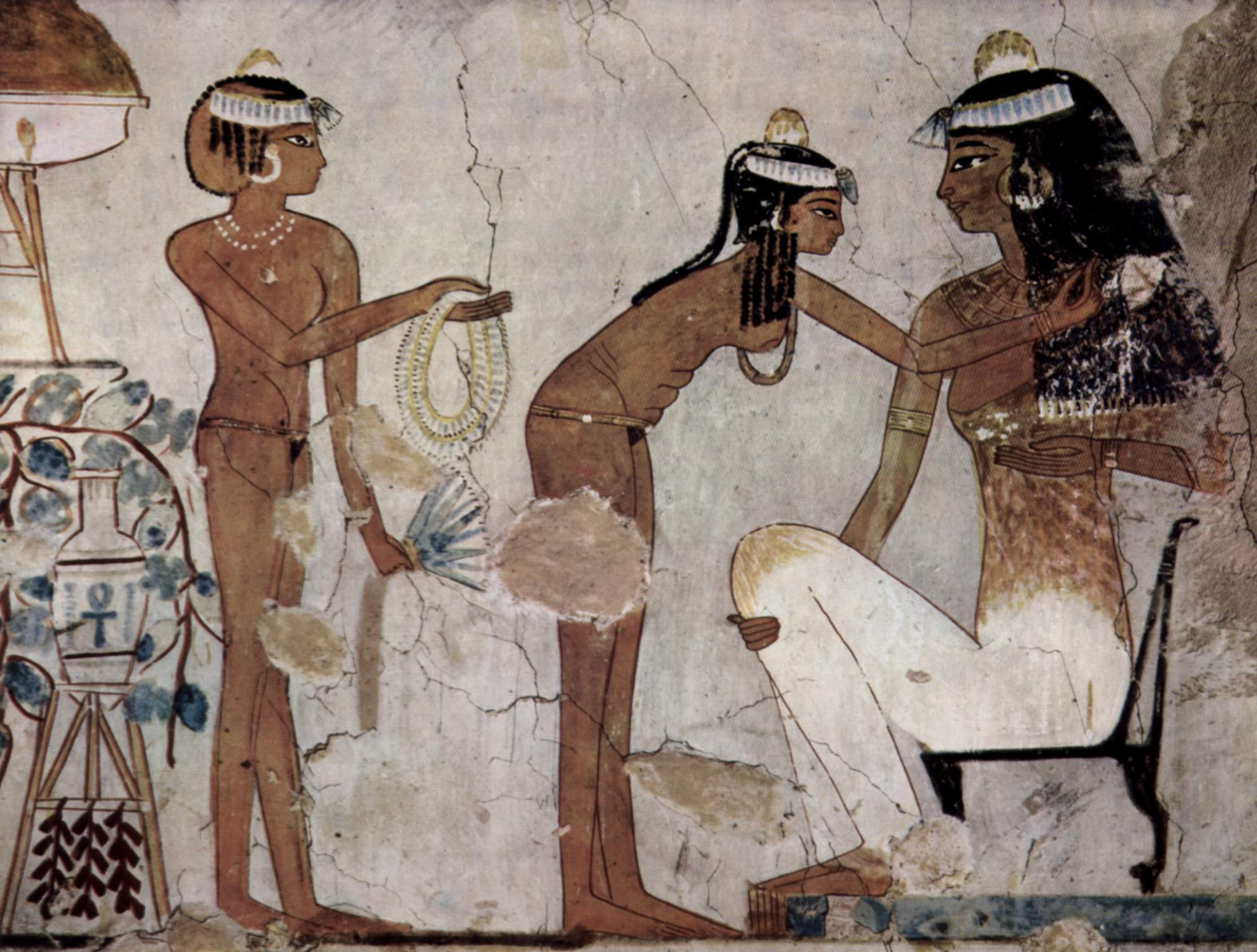
Slave girls getting a woman dressed for the banquet

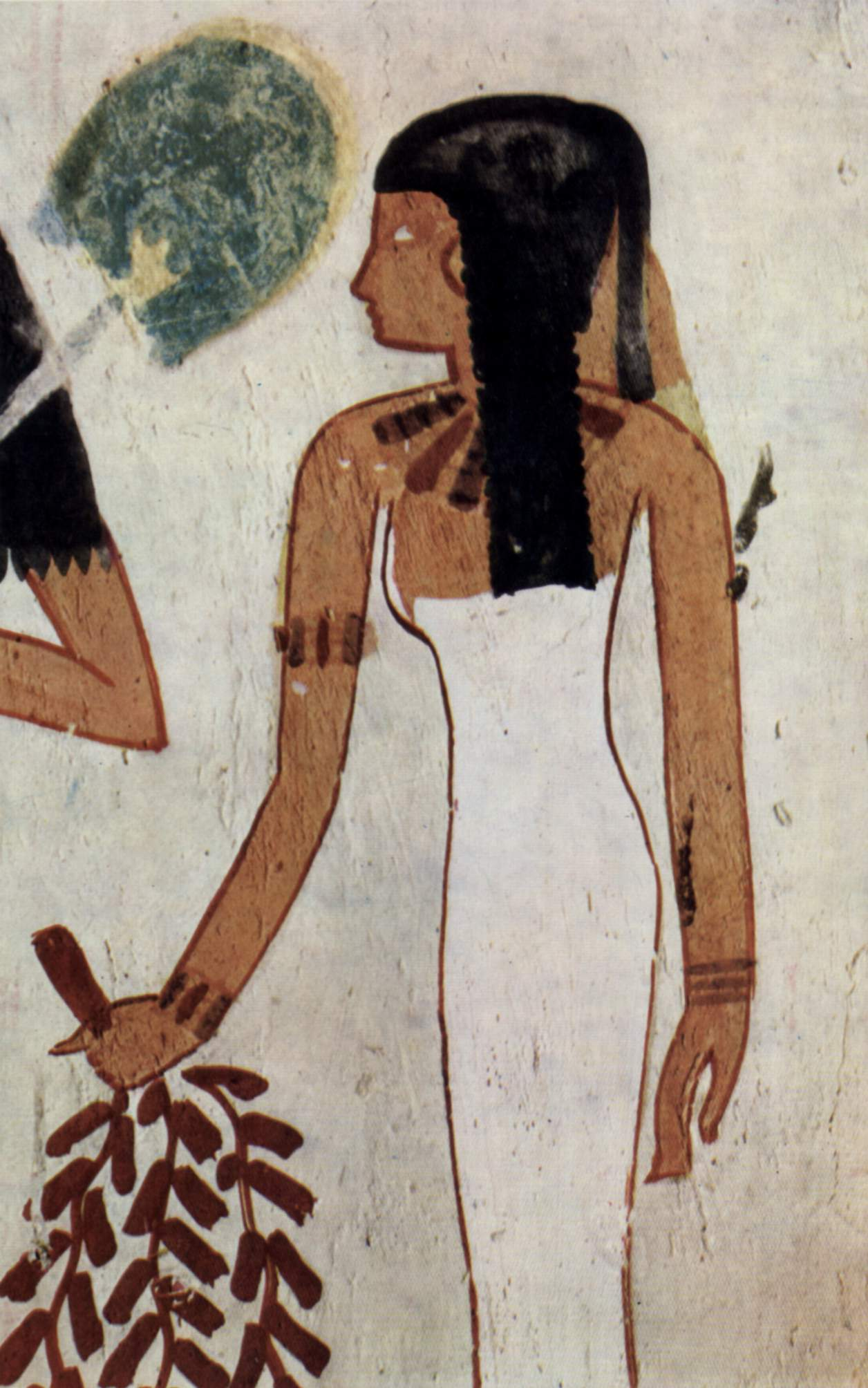
Women bringing plants and papyruses

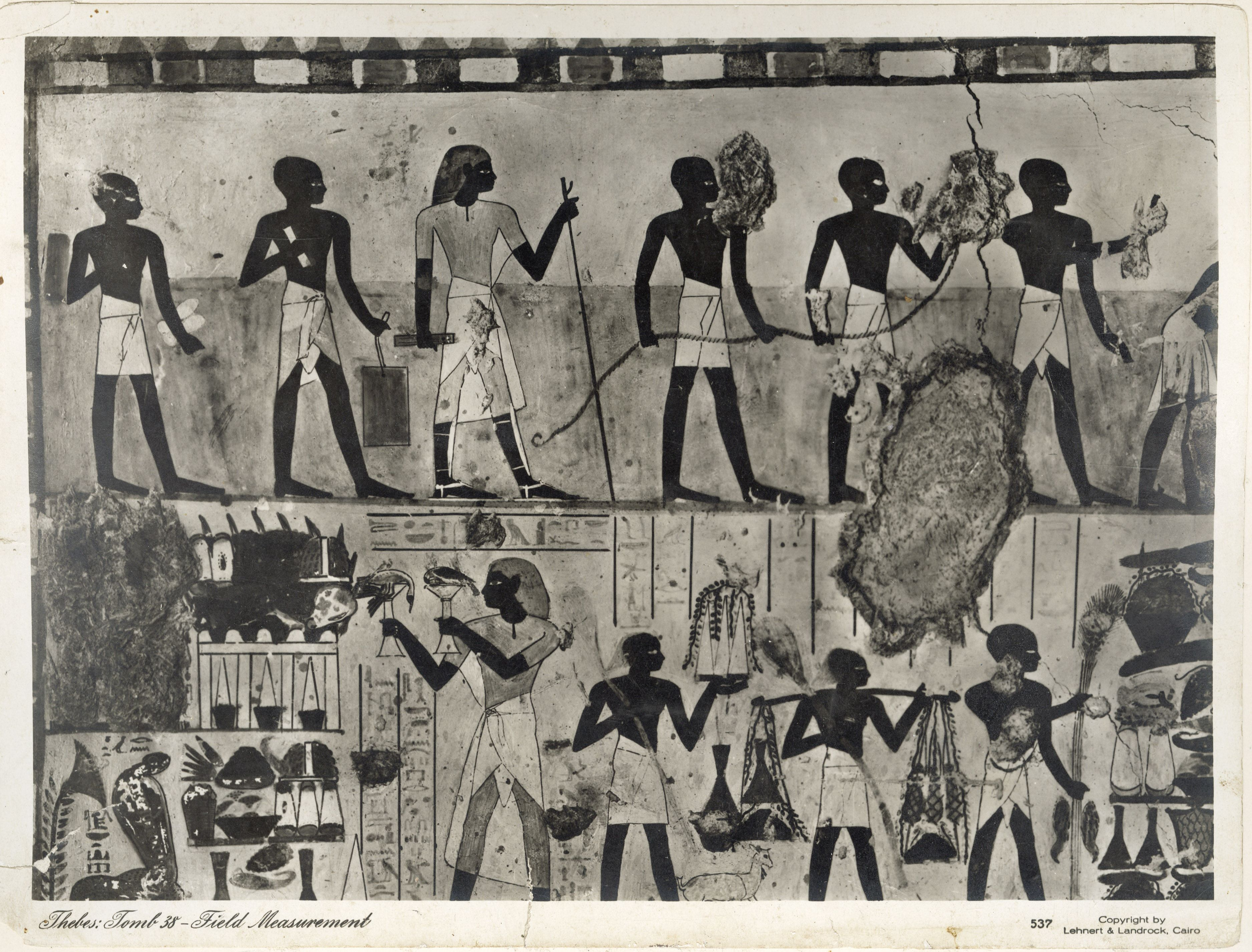
Wall painting scene from the transverse chamber, east wing. In the upper register, the deceased performs some of his duties in the company of some assistants. In the lower register, the deceased makes offerings to Amun and Renutet. The photograph (taken around 1930s) documents a wall that is in a more damaged condition today.

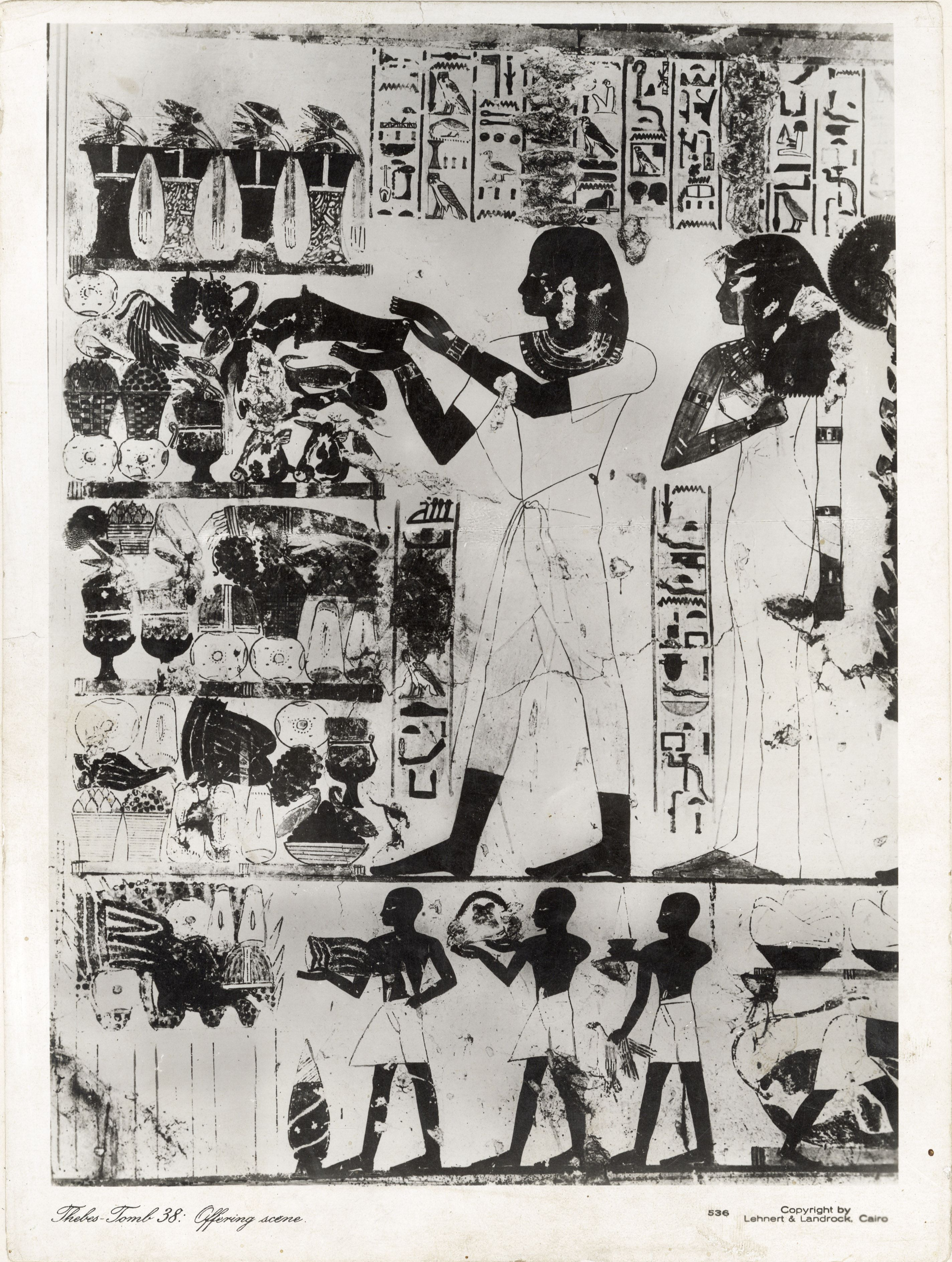
Wall painting scene from the transverse chamber, east wing. In the scene, the deceased and his wife Wadjrenpet (behind her is a third person - their son, not visible here) make offerings to honour Amun-Ra and Osiris. At present, the wall is partially ruined, in contrast to the state of preservation at the time of the photograph (around 1930s).

== See also ==
- List of Theban tombs
- N. de Garis Davies, Nina and Norman de Garis Davies, Egyptologists
