= Amenmose (noble) =

The ancient Egyptian noble Amenmose lived in Thebes during the reigns of Amenhotep III. He was buried in a tomb in Sheikh Abd el-Qurna, part of the Theban Necropolis.
