= TT385 =

Theban tomb

Theban tomb TT385
- Burial site of Hunefer
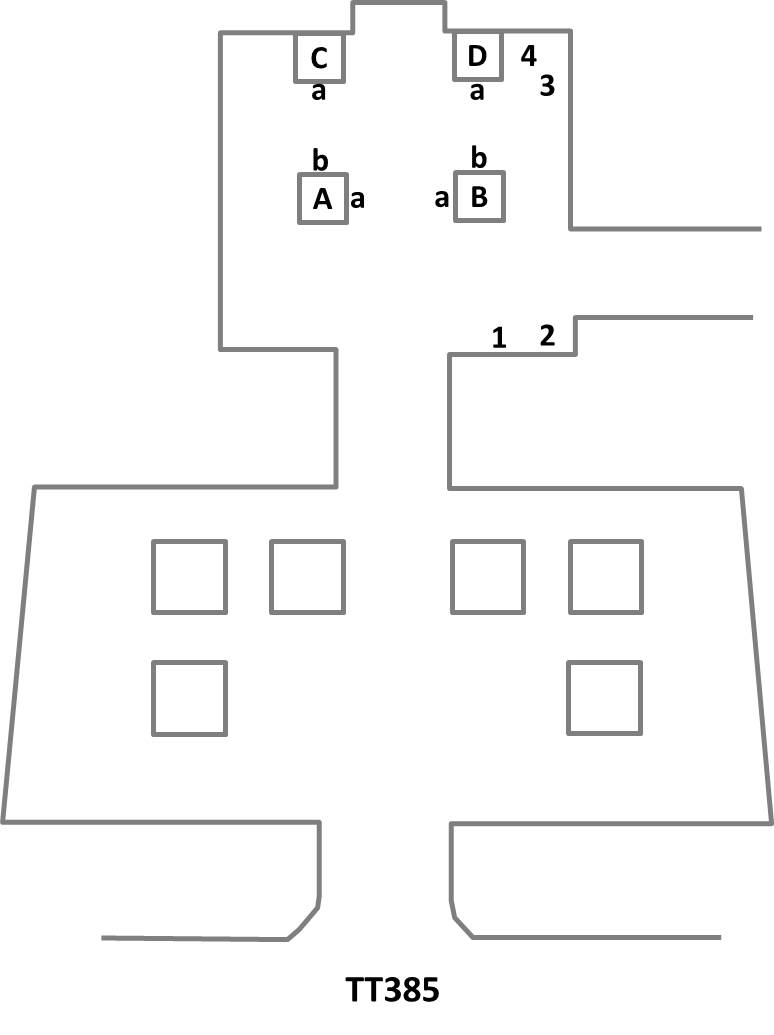

- Location within Egypt
- Location: Sheikh Abd el-Qurna, Theban Necropolis
- ← Previous; TT384 Next → TT386

O4 w Y1 N33A nfr f r
Hunefer
in hieroglyphs
Era: New Kingdom
(1550–1069 BC)

The Theban Tomb TT385 is located in Sheikh Abd el-Qurna, part of the Theban Necropolis, on the west bank of the Nile, opposite Luxor. It is the burial place of the ancient Egyptian Hunefer (Haunefer), who was a Mayor of the Southern City (Thebes) during the reign of Ramesses II in the Nineteenth Dynasty.

Hunefer is depicted in the tomb with his wife Nehty (also given as Nuhet). Hunefer and his wife are depicted on the pillars in the inner hall. He has a variety of titles including: Mayor of the (Southern) City, Superintendent of the Granaries of the Sacred Offerings of Amun and Superintendent of Amun.

Depicted in a scene in the King's High Steward Nebsumenu's tomb (TT183), Hunefer is said to be a brother of Nebsumenu. Further titles, besides Mayor of the city, are given for Hunefer in several scenes in the hall of this tomb: High Steward and Steward in the Temple of King Djoserkare. Hunefer's wife is called Inuhey in Nebsumenu's tomb. If Hunefer is really a full brother of Nebsumenu, then he would be a son of the Mayor Paser and his wife Tuia.

From this tomb comes most likely Hunefer's granite sarcophagus now in the Fitzwilliam Museum in Cambridge.

== See also ==
- List of Theban tombs
