= Amethu called Ahmose =

Ancient Egyptian vizier

- Vizier of the South
Egyptian name
O29 D38 T w
- Successor: Useramen
- Dynasty: 18th Dynasty
- Pharaoh: Thutmose II, Hatshepsut and Thutmose III
- Burial: Thebes TT83
- Spouse: Ta-Amethu
- Children: Useramen, Neferweben, Amenhotep, Akheperkare

Amethu called Ahmose was a vizier of ancient Egypt. He served during the reign of Thutmose II and the early years of the reign of Hatshepsut and Thutmose III of the 18th Dynasty.

== Family ==
His wife's name was Ta-Amethu. Their children include the viziers Useramen and Neferweben. Two additional sons are known from Theban tomb TT122: Amenhotep, an Overseer of the Magazine of Amun, and Akheperkare, a prophet of Montu.

Amethu called Ahmose and his wife Ta-Amethu also had several grandchildren. The later second prophet of Amun Merymaat was a son of Amenhotep. Vizier Rekhmire was a son of Neferweben.

== Tombs and burial ==
Amethu called Ahmose was buried in TT83 in Sheikh Abd el-Qurna, Thebes.
