= TT131 =

Theban tomb

Coordinates: 25.7333°N 32.6000°E

Theban tomb TT131
- Burial site of Useramen
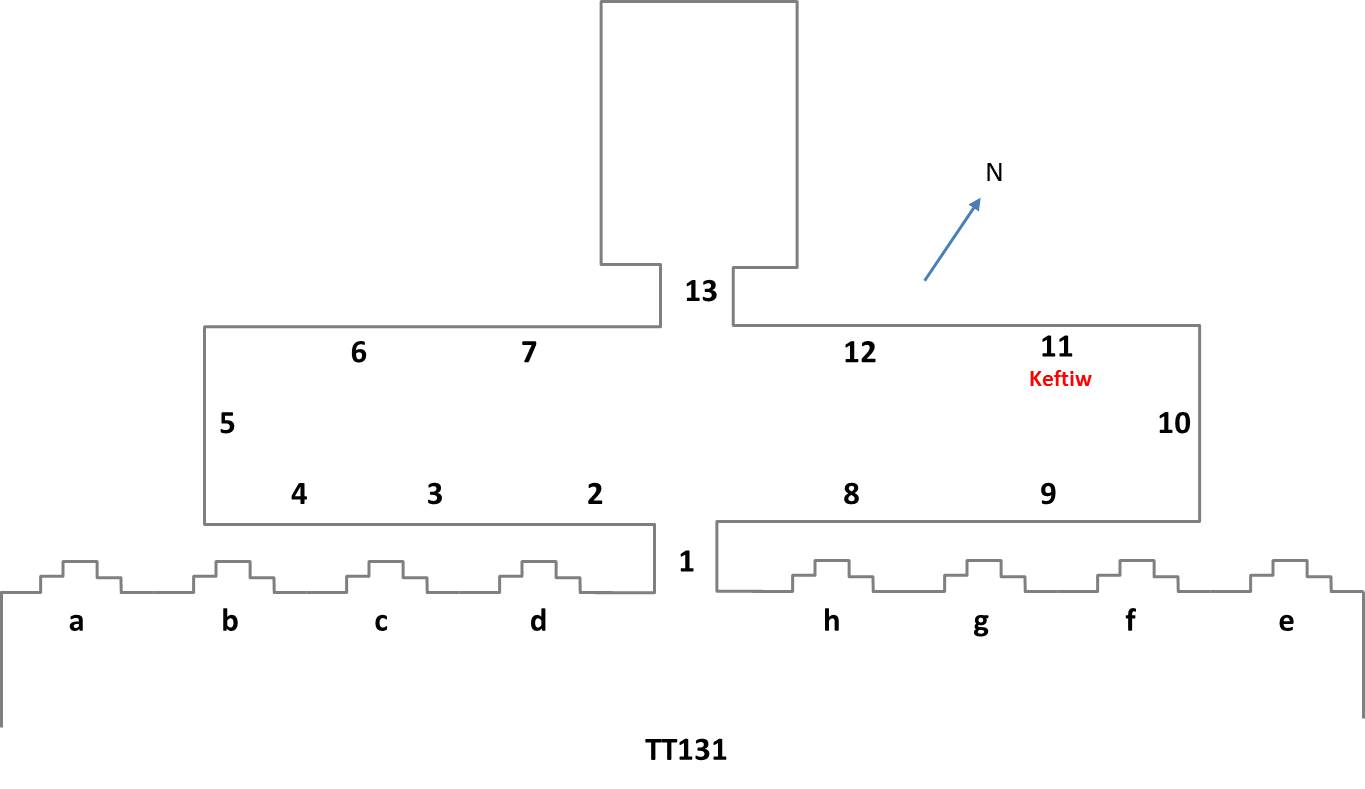

- Location within Egypt
- Location: Sheikh Abd el-Qurna, Theban Necropolis
- ← Previous; TT130 Next → TT132

The Theban Tomb TT131 is located in Sheikh Abd el-Qurna. It forms part of the Theban Necropolis, situated on the west bank of the Nile opposite Luxor.

The tomb belongs to an 18th dynasty Ancient Egyptian named Useramen who was a Vizier during the reigns of Hatshepsut and Thutmosis III. The aged Vizier Amethu (User's father) is shown with a chamberlain, courtiers and User as a scribe before Tuthmosis III, and a text records the installation of User as co-vizier.

== See also ==
- List of Theban tombs
