= Rekhmire =

Ancient Egyptian official

- Vizier of the South
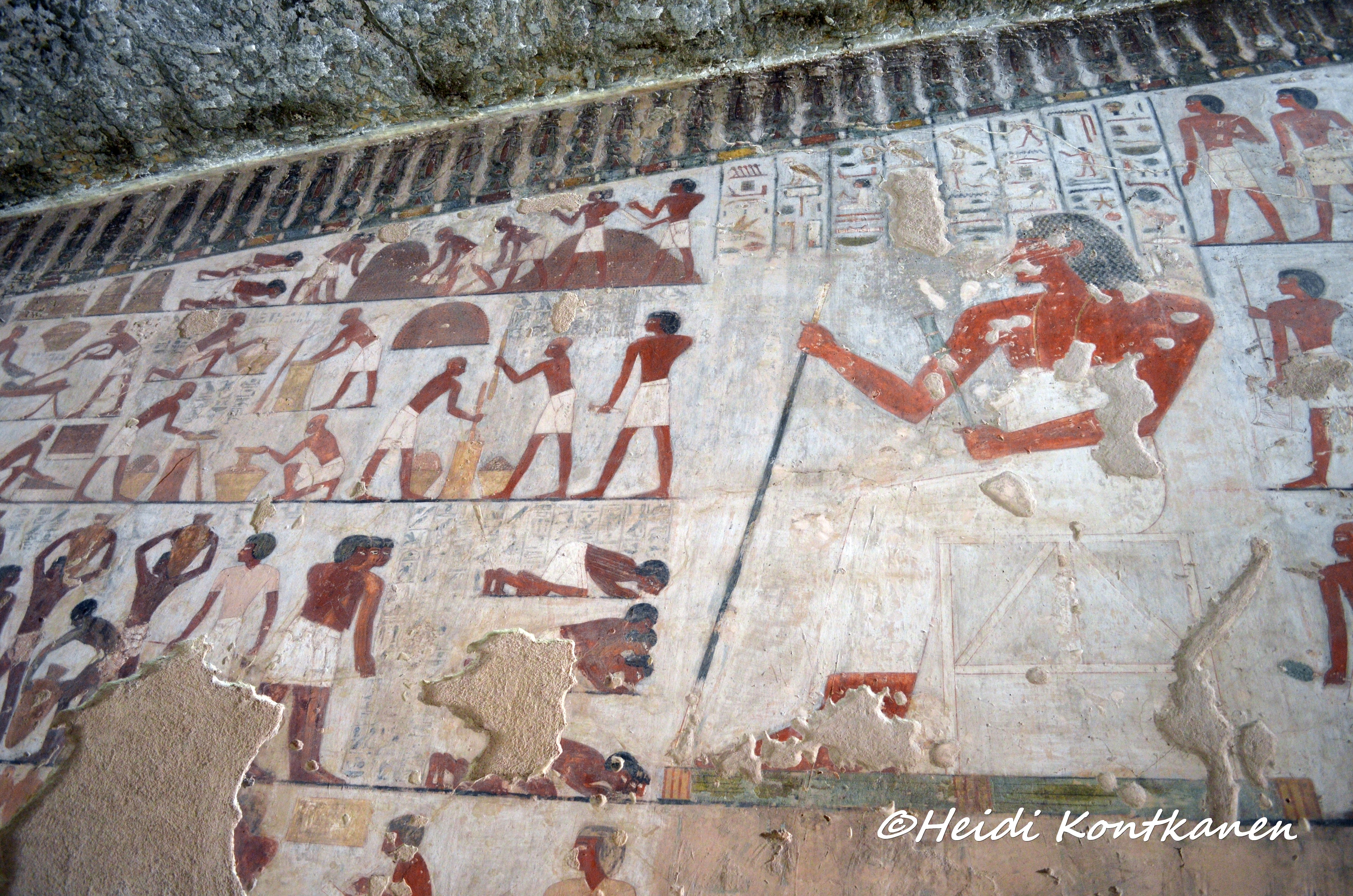
- Vizier Rekhmire sits on a chair or stool in TT100.
- Dynasty: 18th Dynasty
- Pharaoh: Thutmose III and Amenhotep II
- Burial: TT100

Rekhmire was an ancient Egyptian noble and official of the 18th Dynasty who served as "Governor of the Town" (Mayor of Thebes) and Vizier during the reigns of Thutmosis III and Amenhotep II, circa 1400 BCE. He was the nephew of Vizier User, who took office at the time of the fifth year of Queen Hatshepsut’s reign. User's official titles included mayor of the city, vizier, and prince. Rekhmire is noted for constructing a lavishly decorated tomb for himself, today designated TT100, in Sheikh Abd el-Qurna, part of the Theban Necropolis. The tomb contains lively, well preserved scenes of daily life during the Egyptian New Kingdom. His tomb is also important as it contains a full copy of a text detailing the duties of the office of the vizier, known as the Installation of the Vizier.

He was also High Priest of Annu or Heliopolis. The cause of his political and personal downfall remains unclear. It is suspected that he fell into disgrace and was deposed. His tomb was Theban Tomb 100.

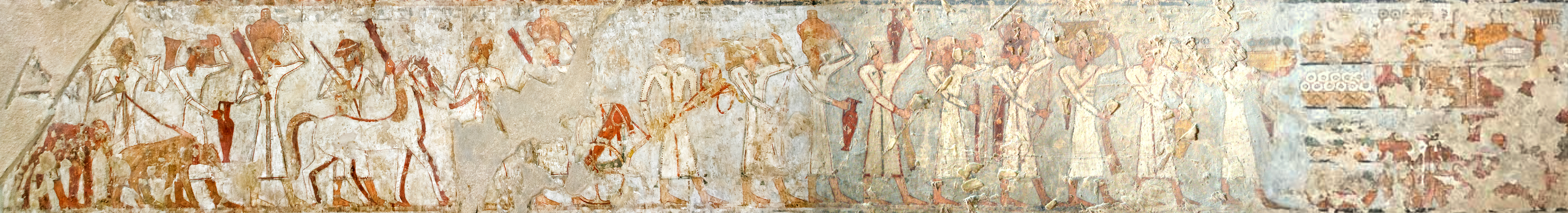
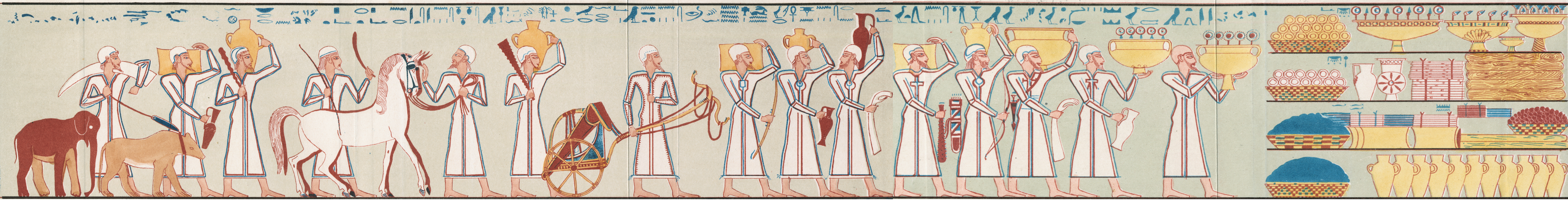
Retjenu Syrians bringing presents in the tomb of Rekhmire, circa 1400 BCE (actual painting and extrapolated drawing)

False door from TT100, now in the Louvre.
