= Useramen =

Ancient Egyptian vizier

- Vizier of the South
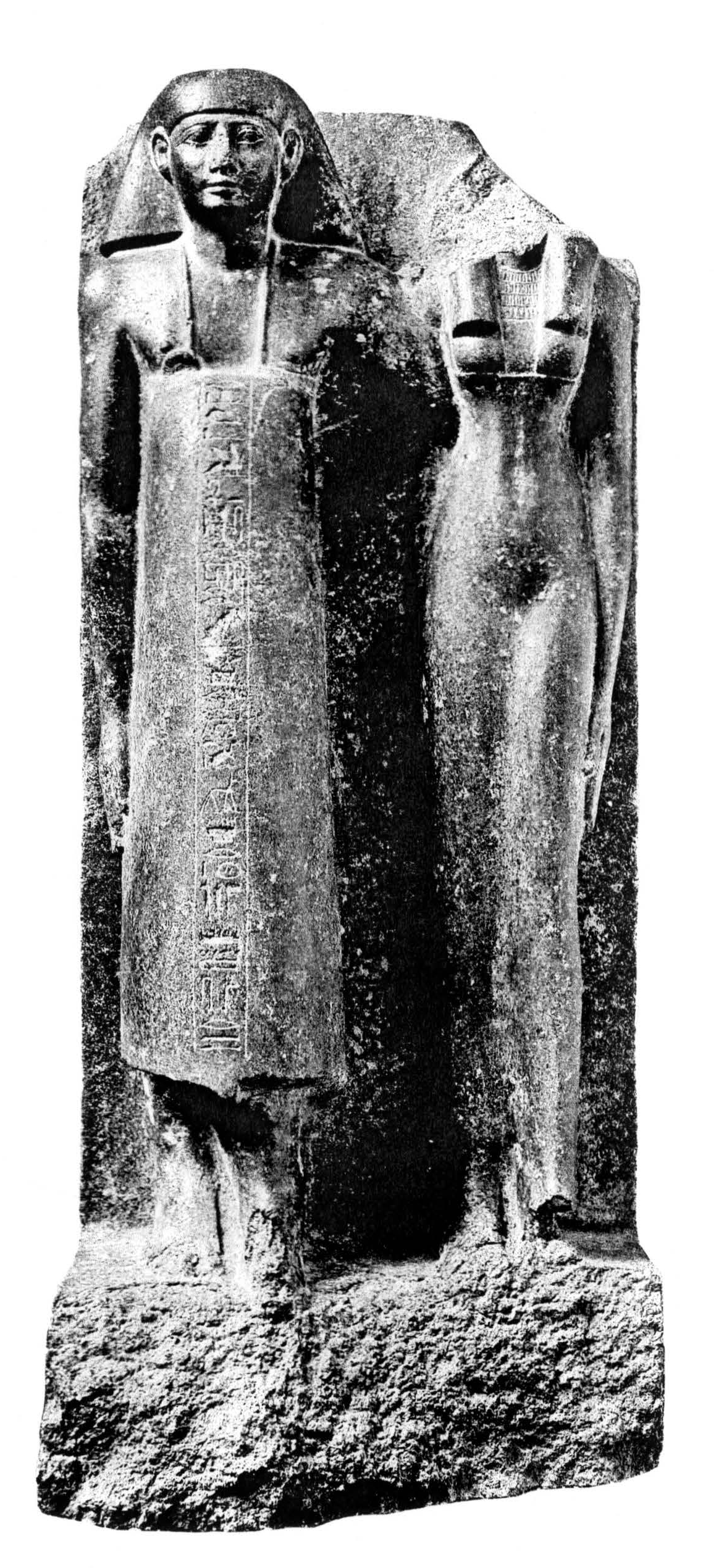
- Useramen and his wife Tuiu, from Karnak.
Egyptian name
F12 s r D40
- Predecessor: Amethu called Ahmose
- Successor: Neferweben
- Dynasty: 18th Dynasty
- Pharaoh: Hatshepsut and Thutmose III
- Burial: Thebes TT61 and TT131
- Spouse: Tuiu
- Father: Amethu called Ahmose
- Mother: Ta-amenthu
- Children: 4 daughters and a son

Useramen (also called User, Amenuser, or Useramun) was an ancient Egyptian vizier under pharaohs Hatshepsut and Thutmose III of the 18th Dynasty.

== Family ==
Useramen was the son of the vizier Amethu called Ahmose, who served during the reign of Thutmose II and the early years of the combined reigns of Hatshepsut and Thutmose III. His mother's name was Ta-amenthu. Useramen was married to a lady named Tuiu, and the couple is known from their tombs to have had at least four daughters and a son.

Useramen came from a very influential family. His father was vizier before him and later his brother Neferweben became vizier as well. Useramen was also the uncle of Rekhmire, who was vizier under Thutmose III.

== Vizierate ==
As vizier Useramen would have been second only to the pharaoh. The vizier was responsible for many of the day-to-day operations of the state. He was installed in this position in year 9 of Hatshepsut's reign (which is also year 5 of Thutmose III), and held the position for 20 years.

== Tombs and burial ==
Useramen had two tombs in the hills of Thebes. In his tomb TT61, his parents, wife and children are mentioned.

Tomb TT131 also belongs to Useramen (here named User). The aged vizier Amethu (User's father) is shown with a chamberlain, courtiers and User as a scribe before Thutmose III, and a text records the installation of User as co-vizier.

A red granite false door from the tomb of Useramen and his wife Tuiu was discovered at Karnak, presumably in secondary use. His official titles included 'Mayor of the City', 'Vizier', and 'Prince'.
