= Sheikh Abd el-Qurna =

Necropolis of ancient Egypt

Coordinates: 25.7317°N 32.6092°E

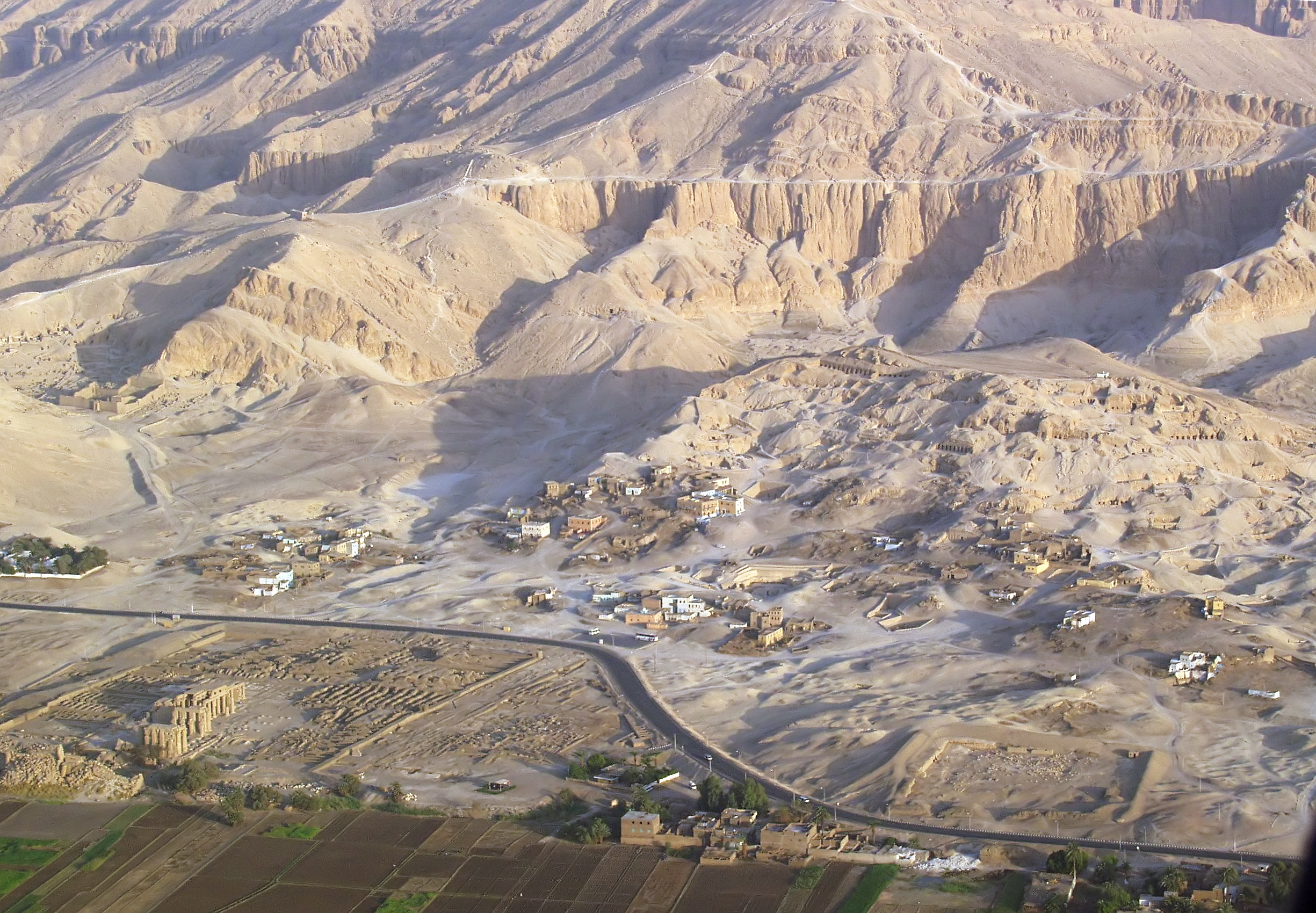
Valley of the Nobles / Sheikh Abd el-Qurna

The necropolis of Sheikh Abd el-Qurna (Arabic: شيخ عبدالقرنة) is located on the West Bank at Thebes in Upper Egypt. It is part of the archaeological area of Deir el-Bahari, and named after the domed tomb of the local saint. This is the most frequently visited cemetery on the Theban west bank, with the largest concentration of private tombs.

== Tombs ==
Anthropoid coffin of Puia (between 1500 and 1450 b.C., New Kingdom), found by Robert Mond in Sheikh Abd el-Qurna. Museo Egizio, Turin.

- TT21 – User, Scribe, Steward of king Thutmose I
- TT22 – Wah, later usurped by Meryamun
- TT23 – Tjay
- TT30 – Khonsmose, Amun treasury official, Ramesside
- TT31 – Khonsu
- TT38 – Djeserkaraseneb, Scribe, Counter of grain in the granary of the divine offerings of Amun
- TT41 – Amenemopet called Ipy, Amun temple high steward
- TT42 – Amenmose, Captain of troops, Eyes of the King in the Two Lands of the Retenu
- TT43 – Neferrenpet, Overseer of the kitchen (stores?) of Pharaoh
- TT44 – Amenemhab, wab-priest in front of Amun
- TT45 – Djehuty, Steward of high priest of Amun Mery
- TT46 – Ramose, Steward of the Mansion of the Aten, Fanbearer at the right of the King, Overseer of the granaries of Upper and Lower Egypt

TT50 - TT139:

- TT51 – Userhat called Neferhabef
- TT52 – Nakht
- TT55 – Ramose
- TT57 – Khaemhat called Mahu
- TT60 – Senet, mother or wife of Intefiqer
- TT66 – Hepu
- TT67 – Hapuseneb
- TT69 – Menna
- TT71 – Senenmut (unused)
- TT83 – Amethu called Ahmose
- TT96 – Sennefer
- TT100 – Rekhmire
- TT109 – the tutor Min
- TT120 – Anen
- TT139 – Pairy
- TT170 – Nebmehyt, Scribe of recruits of the Ramesseum in the estate of Amun
- TT171 – Unknown
- TT224 – Ahmose Humay (J'h-ms, Hm.j), Overseer of the estate of the God's Wife, Overseer of the double granaries of the God's Wife Ahmose-Nefertary
- TT225 – unknown / perhaps Amenemhet, High priest of Hathor
- TT226 – Heqareshu (Hq3-ršw), Royal scribe, Overseer of nurses of the king
- TT227 – Unknown
- TT228 – Amen(em)mose (Jmn-msj(w)), Scribe of the Amun treasury
- TT229 – Unknown
- TT230 – Men (?) (Mn), Scribe of troops of Pharaoh
- TT249 – Neferrenpet (Nfr-rnp.t), supplier of dates/cakesin the temple of Amenhotep III
- TT251 – Amenmose, Royal scribe, Overseer of cattle of Amun, Overseer of magazine of Amun
- TT252 – Senimen (Sn(.j)-mn(.w)), Steward, Nurse of the God's Wife
- TT259 – Hori (Hr.j), wab-priest, Scribe in all the monuments of the estate of Amun, Head of the outline-draughtsmen in the Gold House of the Amun domain
- TT263 – Piay (Pj3jj), Scribe in the granary in the Amun domain, Scribe of accounts in the Ramesseum
- TT269 – Unknown
- TT280 – Meketre (Mk.t(.j)-R'), Chief Steward, Chancellor, early Middle Kingdom
- TT309 – Unknown
- TT317 – Thutnefer, Scribe of the counting of corn in the granary of divine offerings of Amun
- TT318 – Amenmose, Necropolis-worker of Amun
- TT331 – Penne (P3-n-njwt, P3-n-nwt) called Sunero (Srr, Sw-n-r3), High priest of Monthu

TT341-TT351

- TT343 – Benia
- TT367 – Paser, Head of the Bowmen, Child of the nursery, Companion of His Majesty
- TT368 – Amenhotep Huy, Overseer of sculptors of Amun in Thebes
- TT384 – Nebmehyt (Nb-mhj.t), Priest of Amun in the Ramesseum
- TT385 – Hunefer (H3w-nfr), Mayor of Thebes, Overseer of the granary of divine offerings of Amun
- TT391 – Kerebasken (K3-r-b3-s3-kn, Krbskn), Prophet of Khonsemweset-Neferhotep, Fourth prophet of Amun, Mayor of the City

TT397-TT400

- TT403 – Merymaat (Mrj-m3'.t), Temple scribe, Steward

Miscellaneous

- Sheikh Abd el-Qurna cache, a reburial of several 18th Dynasty princesses

== Archaeological finds ==
In February 2026, the Egyptian Ministry of Tourism and Antiquities announced the discovery of a major cache of 22 colorful, sealed wooden sarcophagi of “Chanters of Amun,” containing mummies and eight papyri containing funerary texts and scenes from the Book of the Dead in the Tomb of Djeserkaraseneb (TT38) at Sheikh Abd el-Qurna.

== See also ==
- Sheikh Abd el-Qurna cache
- List of Theban Tombs
- Qurna
