= TT20 =

Theban Tomb

Coordinates: 25.7333°N 32.6000°E

Theban tomb TT20
- Burial site of Mentuhirkhepeshef
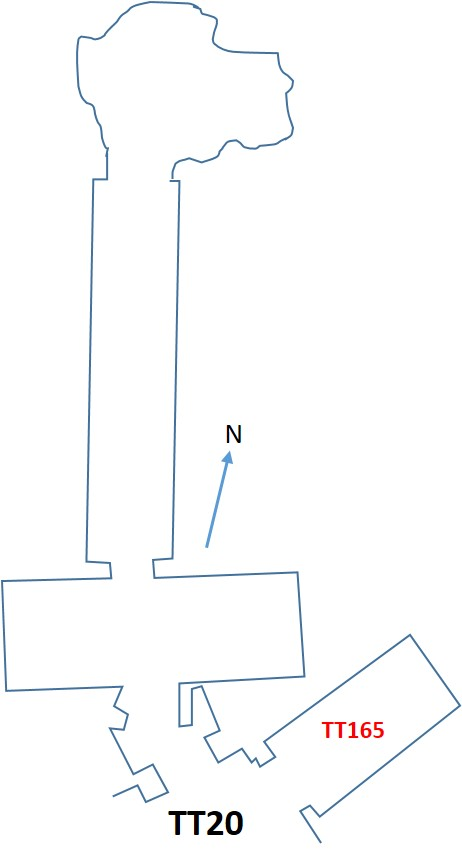

- Location within Egypt
- Location: Dra' Abu el-Naga', Theban Necropolis
- Excavated by: Davies
- ← Previous; TT19 Next → TT21

mn n T w D2 Z1 F23 Z1 f
Mentuhirkhepeshef
in hieroglyphs
Era: New Kingdom
(1550–1069 BC)

The Theban Tomb TT20 is located in Dra' Abu el-Naga', part of the Theban Necropolis, on the west bank of the Nile, opposite to Luxor. It is the burial place of the ancient Egyptian Mentuhirkhepeshef, who was fan-bearer and mayor of Tjebu during the mid-Eighteenth Dynasty, probably during the reign of Tuthmosis III. Mentuhirkhepeshef was the son of a lady named Taysent.

The scenes in the tomb include funeral ceremonies. People are shown carrying the coffin, there is a 'raising of the olive tree', and there are Nubian captives depicted. Another scene shows Mentuhirkhepeshef hunting in the desert. There are scenes showing wild sheep and one showing an ass giving birth.

== See also ==
- List of Theban tombs
