= TT21 =

Theban tomb

Coordinates: 25.7333°N 32.6000°E

Theban tomb TT21
- Burial site of User
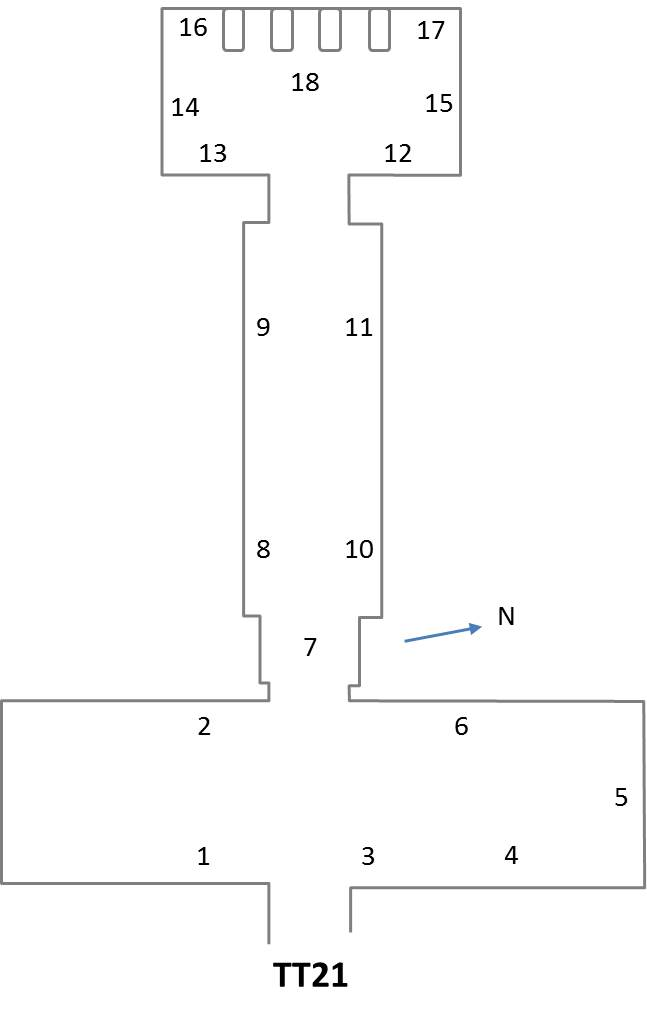

- Location within Egypt
- Location: Sheikh Abd el-Qurna, Theban Necropolis
- Excavated by: Davies
- ← Previous; TT20 Next → TT22

F12 s r D40
User
in hieroglyphs
Era: New Kingdom
(1550–1069 BC)

The Theban Tomb TT21 is located in Sheikh Abd el-Qurna, part of the Theban Necropolis, on the west bank of the Nile, opposite to Luxor. It is the burial place of the ancient Egyptian User, who was a scribe and steward of king Tuthmosis I during the early Eighteenth Dynasty. User's wife was named Bakt.

== See also ==
- List of Theban tombs
