= TT22 =

Theban tomb

Coordinates: 25.732731°N 32.610542°E

Theban tomb TT22
- Burial site of Wah and Meryamun
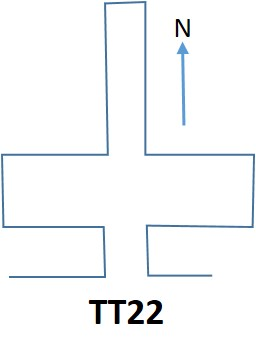

- Location within Egypt
- Location: Sheikh Abd el-Qurna, Theban Necropolis
- ← Previous; TT21 Next → TT23

V29 H Y1
Wah
in hieroglyphs
Era: New Kingdom
(1550–1069 BC)

The Theban Tomb TT22 is located in Sheikh Abd el-Qurna, part of the Theban Necropolis, on the west bank of the Nile, opposite to Luxor. It is the burial place of the ancient Egyptian Wah, who was royal butler during the early Eighteenth Dynasty.

Wah also held the title of overseer of the ruyt, which was an entrance to the palace (per nesu). The overseer of the ruyt may have controlled access to the palace including the office of the vizier.

== Tomb decorations ==
The tomb decorations are described in some detail by Mackay in a 1917 publication. The scenes in the tomb are laid out according to a square grid (each 53 mm on the side). The sketches from the tomb included include a scene of a couple at a banquet and some duck hunting scenes in the marshes. The seated couple is accompanied by their daughter. In the hunting and fowling scene the deceased is accompanied by his wife and children. A text referring to Meryamun accompanies the scene.

== Tomb usurped by Meryamun ==
i mn n mr i i
Meryamun
in hieroglyphs
Era: New Kingdom
(1550–1069 BC)

The tomb was later partially usurped by a man named Meryamun, who held the title Eldest son of the King. Meryamun's wife is mentioned in the tomb. Her name was Hatshepsut.

== See also ==
- N. de Garis Davies, Nina and Norman de Garis Davies, Egyptologists
- List of Theban tombs
