= TT23 =

Theban tomb

Coordinates: 25.7333°N 32.6000°E

Theban tomb TT23
- Burial site of Tjay or Thay called To
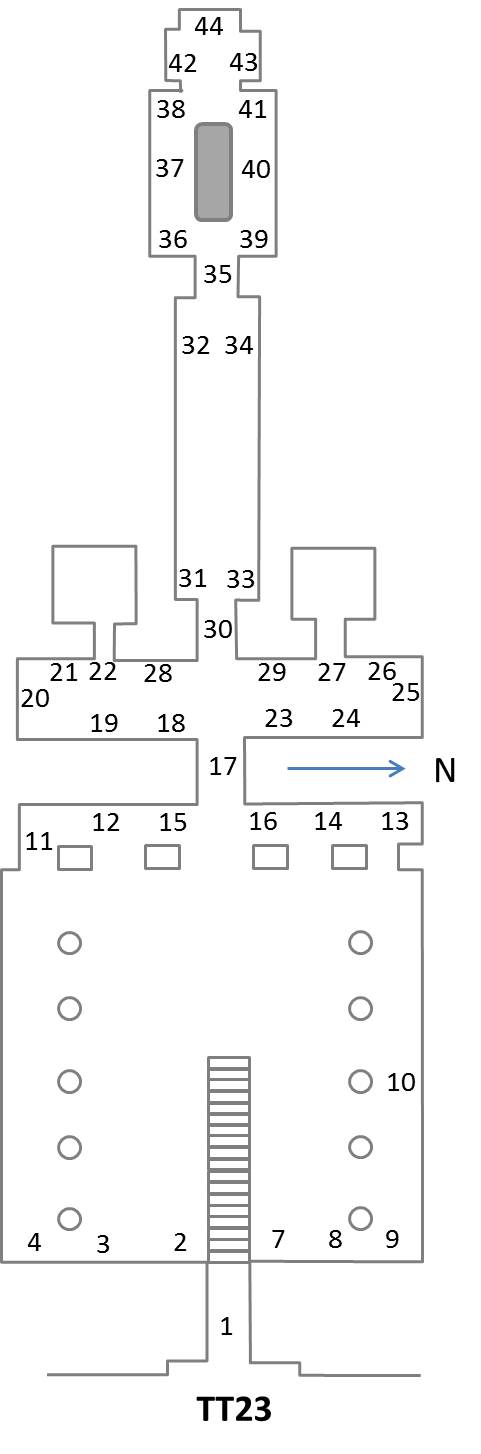

- Location within Egypt
- Location: Sheikh Abd el-Qurna, Theban Necropolis
- ← Previous; TT22 Next → TT24

G47 A i i D52 called N16 Z1 N21
Thay called To
in hieroglyphs
Era: New Kingdom
(1550–1069 BC)

The Theban Tomb TT23 is located in Sheikh Abd el-Qurna, part of the Theban Necropolis, on the west bank of the Nile, opposite to Luxor. It is the burial place of the ancient Egyptian official, Tjay or Thay called To, who was a royal scribe of the dispatches of the Lord of the Two Lands, during the 19th Dynasty. Thay served during the reign of Merenptah.

Thay was the son of the scribe of soldiers Khaemteri and Tamy. Two wives are mentioned in TT23. Thay is shown with a wife named Raya, who was chief of the harem of Sobek and another wife who is called Nebettawy.

Within the tomb there is an image of a scene showing the tomb owner being rewarded while before Merenptah.

== See also ==
- N. de Garis Davies – Nina and Norman de Garis Davies, Egyptologists
- List of Theban tombs
