= TT19 =

Theban Tomb

Coordinates: 25.7333°N 32.6000°E

Theban tomb TT19
- Burial site of Amenmose
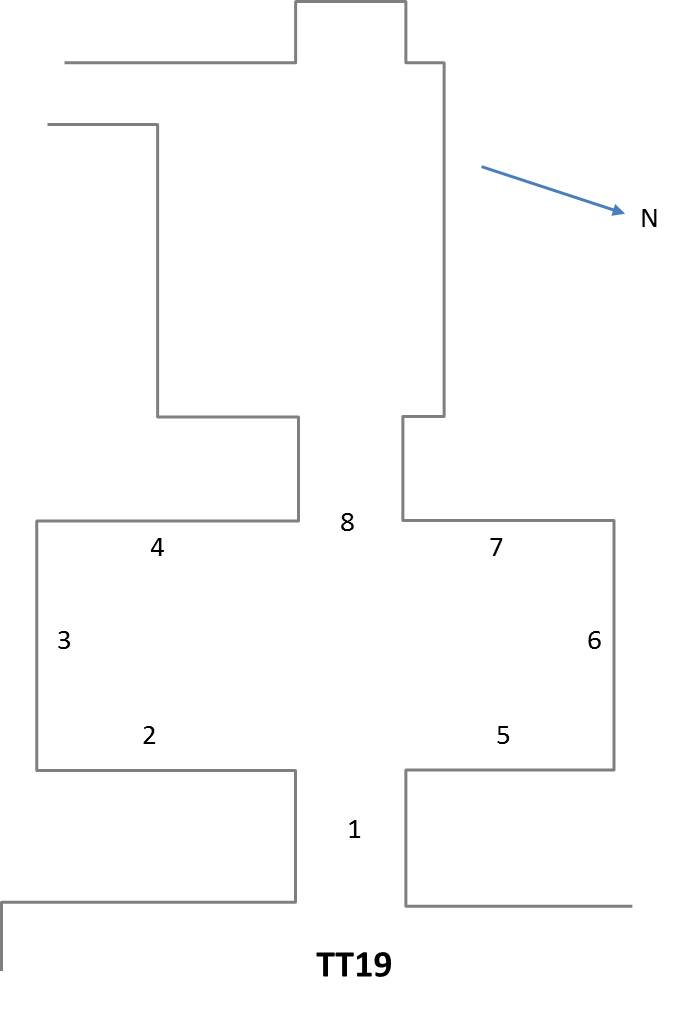

- Location within Egypt
- Location: Dra' Abu el-Naga', Theban Necropolis
- Excavated by: Foucart
- ← Previous; TT18 Next → TT20

i mn n ms s
Amenmose
in hieroglyphs
Era: New Kingdom
(1550–1069 BC)

The Theban Tomb TT19 is located in Dra' Abu el-Naga', part of the Theban Necropolis, on the west bank of the Nile, opposite to Luxor. It is the burial place of the ancient Egyptian Amenmose, who was the high priest of Amenhotep of the Forecourt (Amenhotep I) during the early Nineteenth Dynasty and lived up to the reign of Seti I.

Amenmose's wife Iuy was Chantress of Amun(-Re in Karnak) and Chief of the Harem of Amenhotep I. Amenmose and Iu's sons Beknay and Panefernekhu are depicted in the tomb. Beknay is a wab-priest and Lector of Amenhotep I. Panefernekhu is depicted performing the opening of the mouth ceremony.

The tomb festivals of Amenhotep I are depicted and scenes include statues and barques of Amenhotep I and his mother queen Ahmose Nefertari. The tomb also contains a scene showing Amenhotep and a priest before two rows of kings and queens.

== King list ==
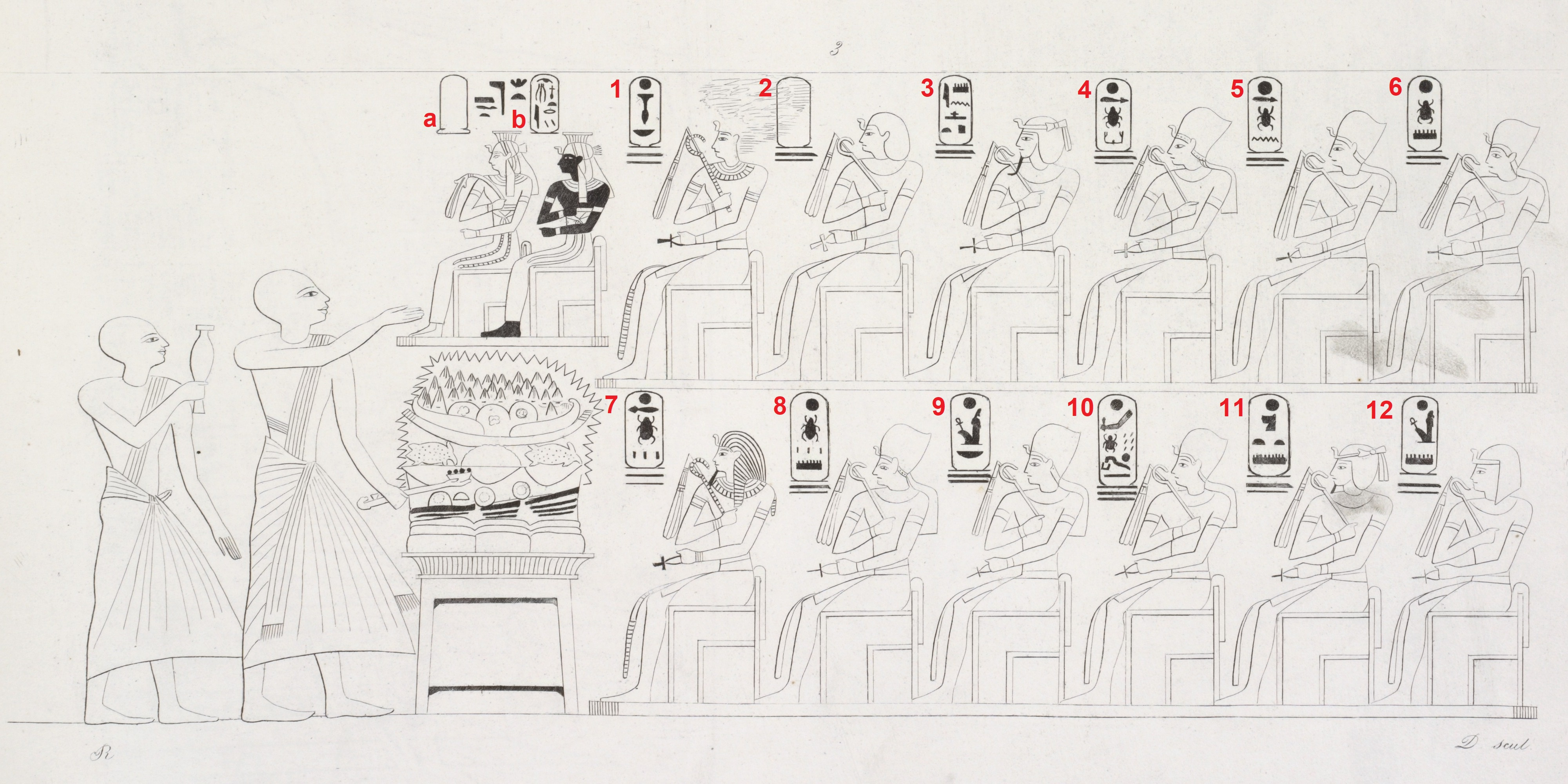
Sketch of the King List

A king's list is present in the tomb. It omits Hatshepsut and the Amarna pharaohs. The king list gives the rulers in the following order:

- Nebhepetre (Mentuhotep II)
- Nebpehtire (Ahmose I)
- Djoserkare (Amenhotep I)
- Akheperkare (Tuthmosis I)
- Akheperenre (Tuthmosis II)
- Menkheperre (Tuthmosis III)
- Aakheperure (Amenhotep II)
- Menkheprure (Tuthmosis IV)
- Nebmare (Amenhotep III)
- Djoserkheprure Setepenre (Horemheb)
- Menpehtyre (Ramesses I)
- Menmaatre (Seti I)

== See also ==
- List of Theban tombs
- N. de Garis Davies, Nina and Norman de Garis Davies, Egyptologists
