= Eighteenth Dynasty of Egypt =

Dynasty of Egypt from c. 1550 to 1292 BCE

- c. 1550 BC–1292 BC
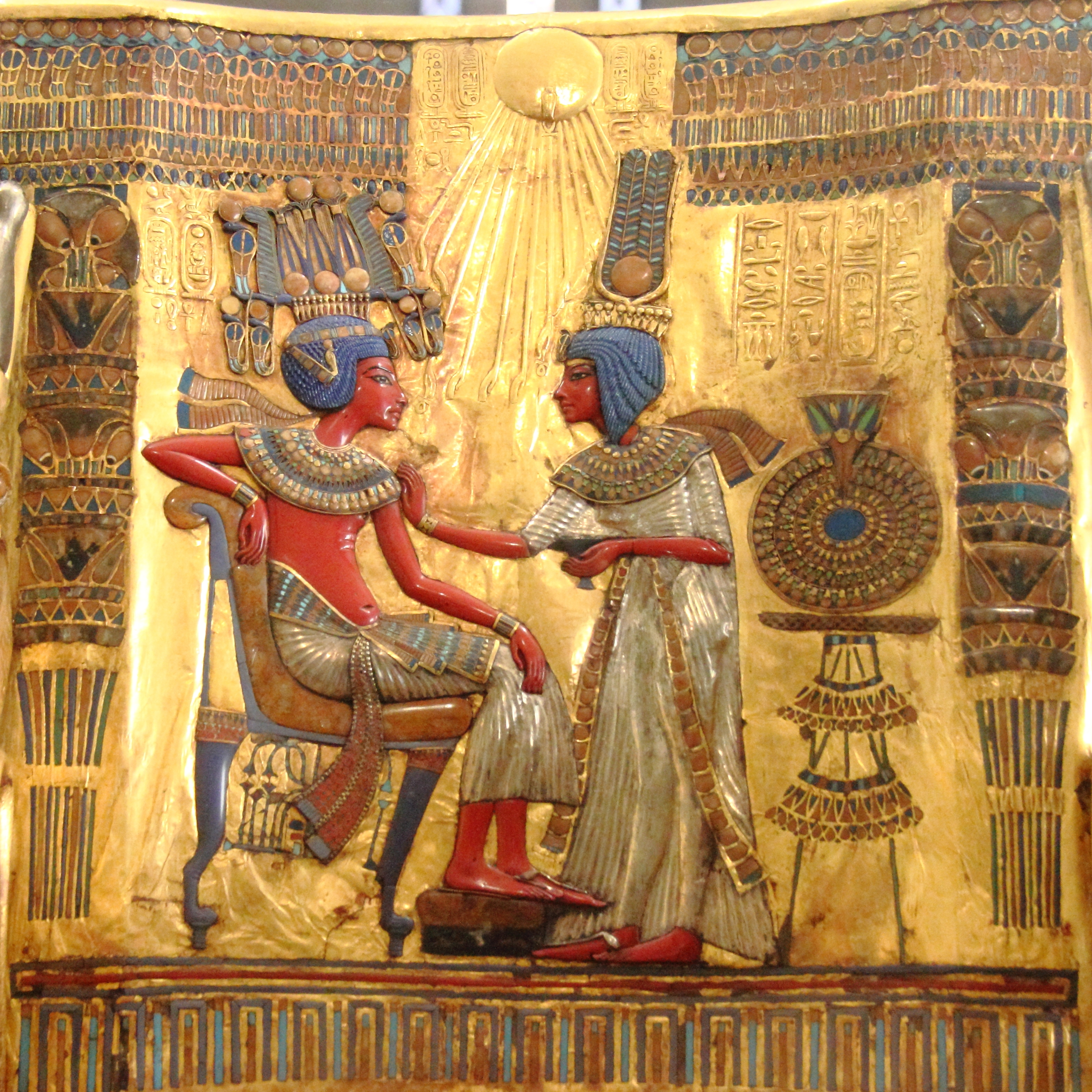
- King Tutankhamun with his Great Royal Wife Ankhesenamun
- Capital: Thebes, Akhetaten (1351–1334) BC
- Common languages: Middle Egyptian (to c. 1350 BC); Late Egyptian (from c. 1350 BC); Canaanite languages Nubian languages Akkadian (diplomatic and trade language)
- Religion: Ancient Egyptian religion Atenism (1351–1334) BC
- Government: Absolute monarchy
- Historical era: New Kingdom of Egypt
  - Defeat of the Fifteenth Dynasty (expulsion of the Hyksos): c. 1550 BC
  - Battle of Megiddo: c. 1457 BC
  - Amarna Period: c. 1350–1330 BC
  - Death of Horemheb: 1292 BC
Preceded by	Succeeded by
Fifteenth Dynasty of Egypt; Seventeenth Dynasty of Egypt	Nineteenth Dynasty of Egypt

The Eighteenth Dynasty of Egypt (notated Dynasty XVIII, alternatively 18th Dynasty or Dynasty 18) is classified as the first dynasty of the New Kingdom of Egypt, the era in which ancient Egypt achieved the peak of its power. The Eighteenth Dynasty spanned the period from 1550/1549 to 1292 BC. This dynasty is also known as the Thutmoside Dynasty for the four pharaohs named Thutmose.

Several of Egypt's most famous pharaohs were from the Eighteenth Dynasty, including Tutankhamun (c. 1341 BC – c. 1323 BC). Other famous pharaohs of the dynasty include Hatshepsut (c. 1479 BC–1458 BC), the longest-reigning woman pharaoh of an indigenous dynasty, and Akhenaten (c. 1353–1336 BC), the "heretic pharaoh", with his Great Royal Wife, Nefertiti.

The Eighteenth Dynasty is unique among indigenous Egyptian dynasties in that it had two queens regnant, women who ruled as pharaohs: Hatshepsut and Neferneferuaten, usually identified as Nefertiti.

== History ==
=== Early Dynasty XVIII ===
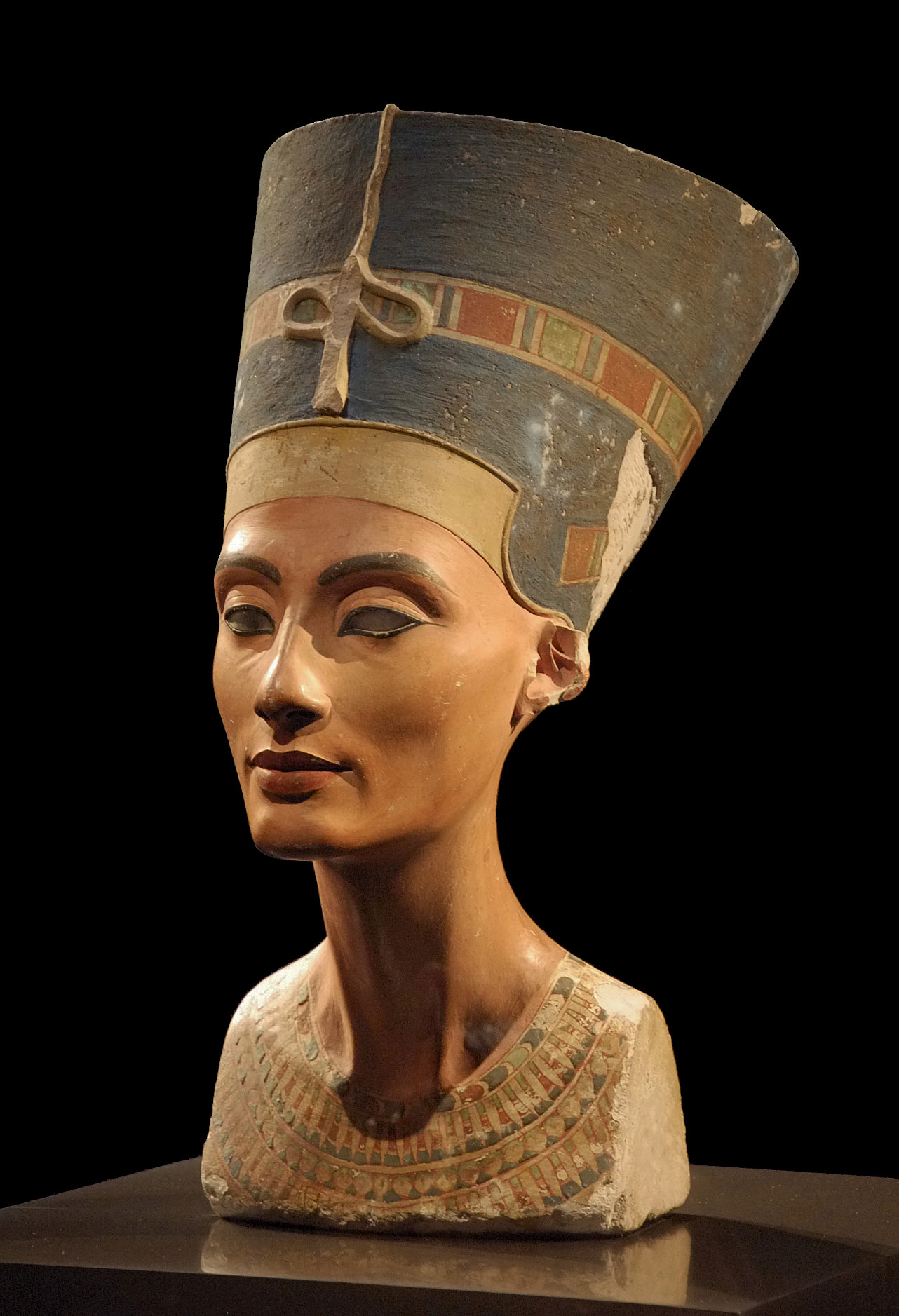
Nefertiti was the queen consort and great royal wife of Pharaoh Akhenaten and increasingly identified with the female pharaoh Neferneferuaten

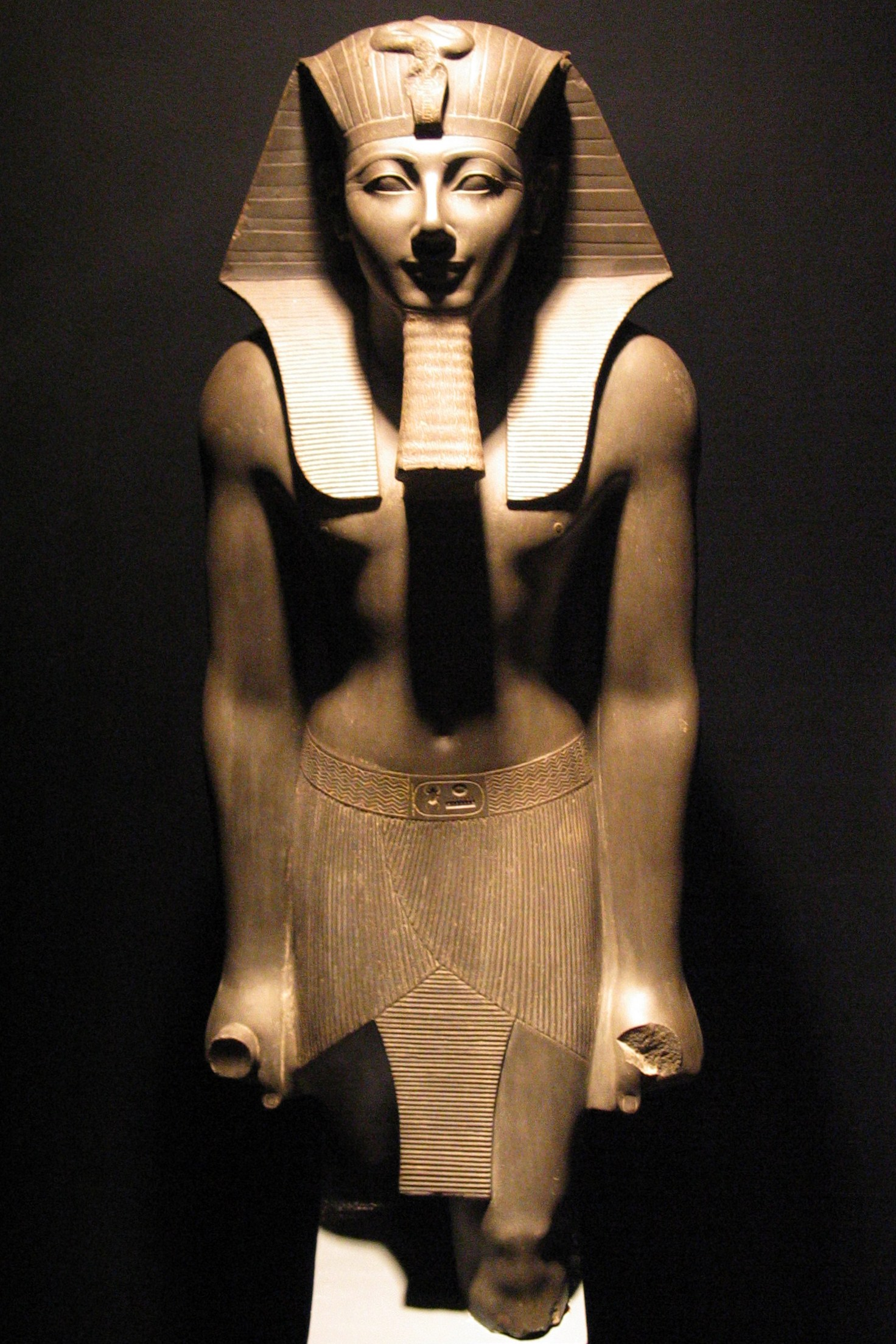
Thutmose III was the sixth pharaoh of the 18th Dynasty. Under his reign, Egypt's Kingdom reached its greatest expansion, from Kush in the south to the Hittite Empire in the north.

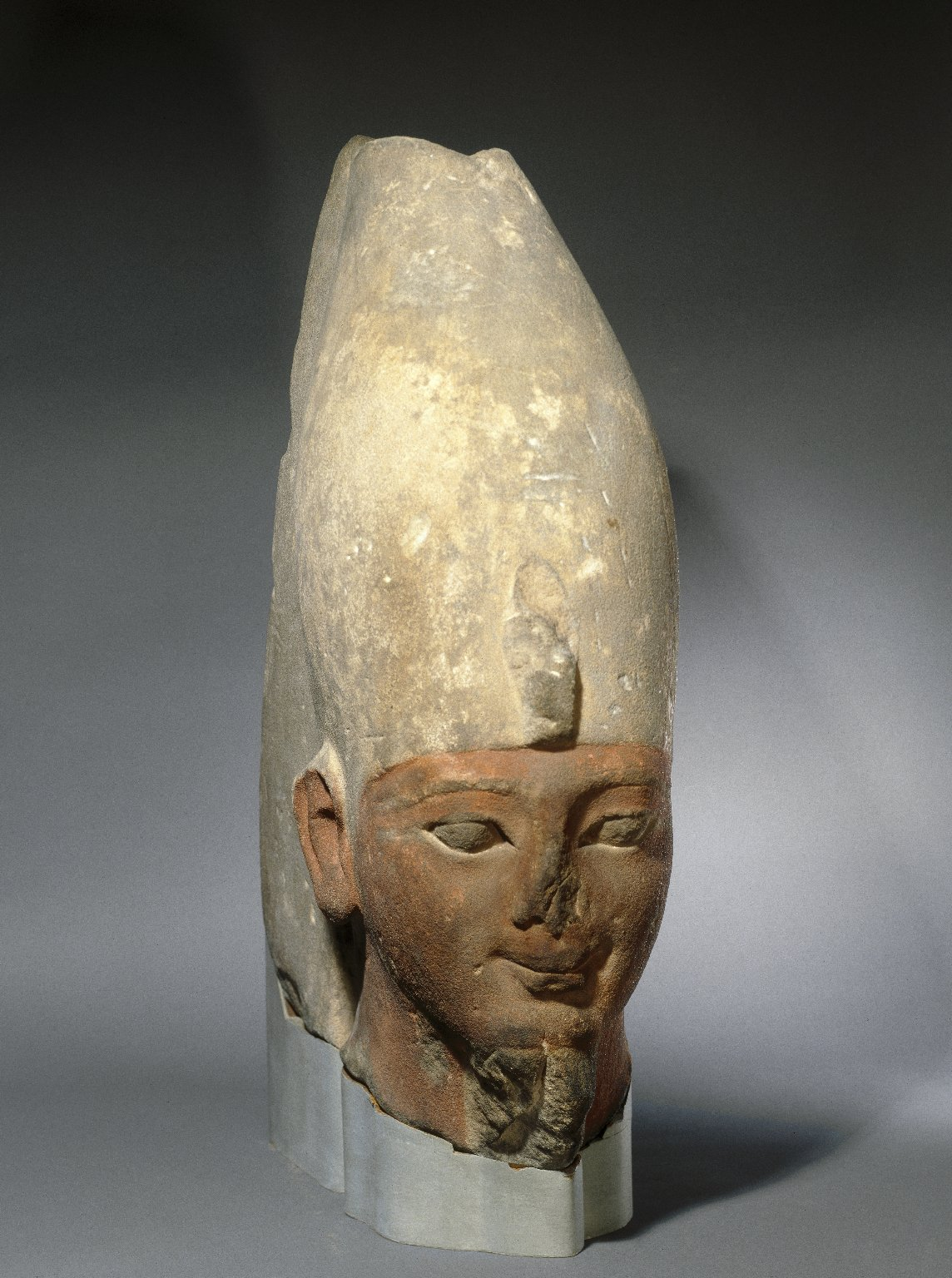
Head of an Early Eighteenth Dynasty King, depicting either Ahmose I, Amenhotep I or Thutmose I, c. 1539–1493 BC, 37.38E, Brooklyn Museum

Dynasty XVIII was founded by Ahmose I, the brother or son of Kamose, the last ruler of the 17th Dynasty. Ahmose finished the campaign to expel the Hyksos rulers. His reign is seen as the end of the Second Intermediate Period and the start of the New Kingdom. Ahmose's consort, Queen Ahmose-Nefertari was "arguably the most venerated woman in Egyptian history, and the grandmother of the 18th Dynasty." She was deified after she died. Ahmose was succeeded by his son, Amenhotep I, whose reign was relatively uneventful.

Amenhotep I probably left no male heir and the next pharaoh, Thutmose I, seems to have been related to the royal family through marriage. During his reign, the borders of Egypt's empire reached their greatest expanse, extending in the north to Carchemish on the Euphrates and in the south up to Kanisah Kurgus beyond the fourth cataract of the Nile. Thutmose I was succeeded by Thutmose II and his queen, Hatshepsut, who was the daughter of Thutmose I. After her husband's death and a period of regency for her minor stepson (who would later become pharaoh as Thutmose III) Hatshepsut became pharaoh in her own right and ruled for over twenty years.

Thutmose III, who became known as the greatest military pharaoh ever, also had a lengthy reign after becoming pharaoh. He had a second co-regency in his old age with his son Amenhotep II. Amenhotep II was succeeded by Thutmose IV, who in his turn was followed by his son Amenhotep III, whose reign is seen as a high point in this dynasty.

Amenhotep III's reign was a period of unprecedented prosperity, artistic splendor, and international power, as attested by over 250 statues (more than any other pharaoh) and 200 large stone scarabs discovered from Syria to Nubia. Amenhotep III undertook large scale building programmes, the extent of which can only be compared with those of the much longer reign of Ramesses II during Dynasty XIX. Amenhotep III's consort was the Great Royal Wife Tiye, for whom he built an artificial lake, as described on eleven scarabs.

=== Akhenaten, the Amarna Period, and Tutankhamun ===
The Aten, i t n ra

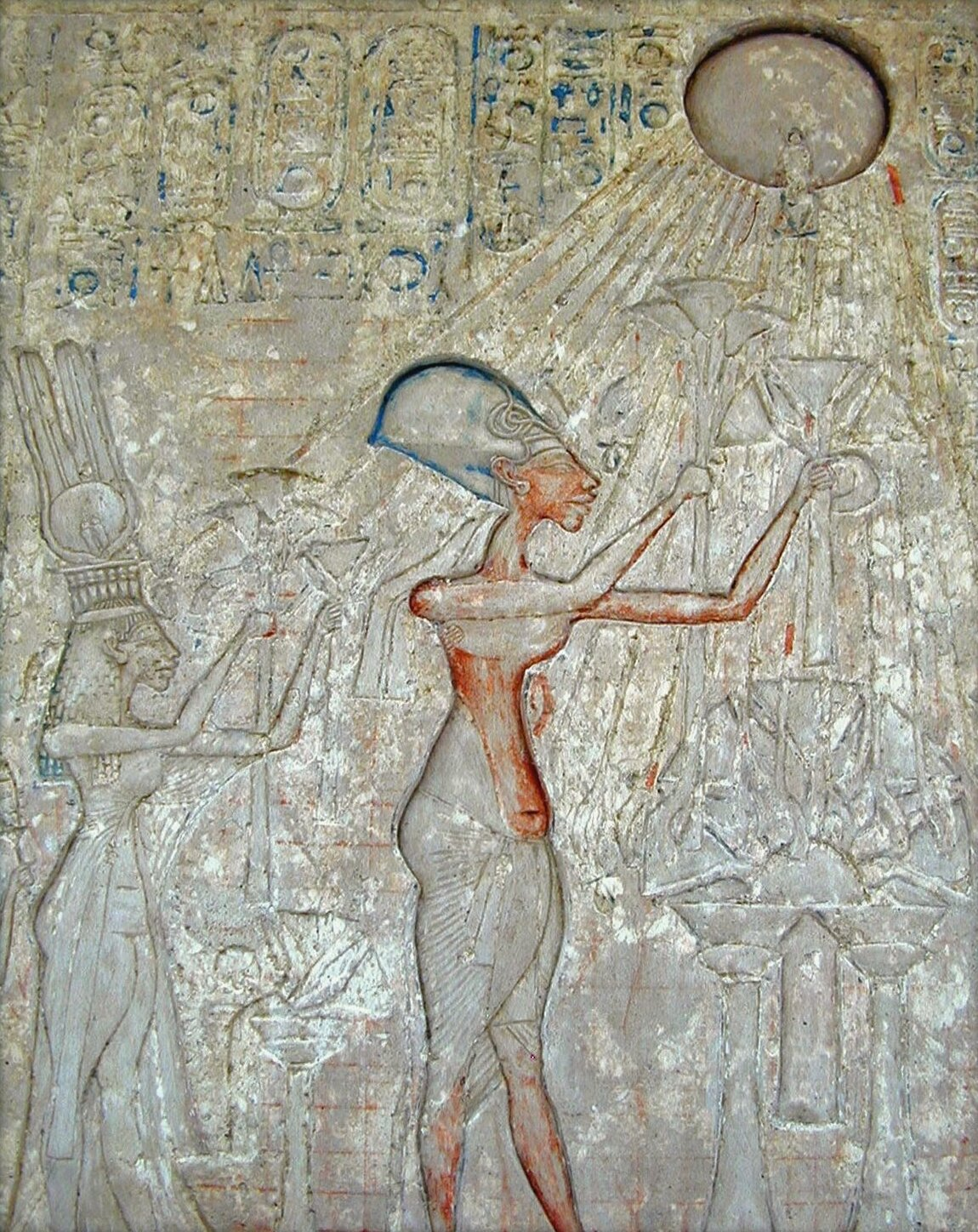
Akhenaten and his family adoring the Aten. Second from the left is Meritaten, daughter of Akhenaten.

Amenhotep III may have shared the throne for up to twelve years with his son Amenhotep IV. There is much debate about this proposed co-regency, with different experts considering that there was a lengthy co-regency, a short one, or none at all.

In the fifth year of his reign, Amenhotep IV changed his name to Akhenaten (ꜣḫ-n-jtn, "Effective for the Aten") and moved his capital to Amarna, which he named Akhetaten. During the reign of Akhenaten, the Aten (jtn, the sun disk) became, first, the most prominent deity, and eventually came to be considered the only god. Whether this amounted to true monotheism continues to be the subject of debate within the academic community. Some state that Akhenaten created a monotheism, while others point out that he merely suppressed a dominant solar cult by the assertion of another, while he never completely abandoned several other traditional deities.

Later Egyptians considered this "Amarna Period" an unfortunate aberration. After his death, Akhenaten was succeeded by two short-lived pharaohs, Smenkhkare and Neferneferuaten, of which little is known. In 1334 BC, Akhenaten's probable son, Tutankhaten, ascended to the throne: shortly after, he restored Egyptian polytheist cult and subsequently changed his name to Tutankhamun, in honor to the Egyptian god Amun. His infant daughters represent the final genetically related generation of the Eighteenth Dynasty.

=== Ay and Horemheb ===
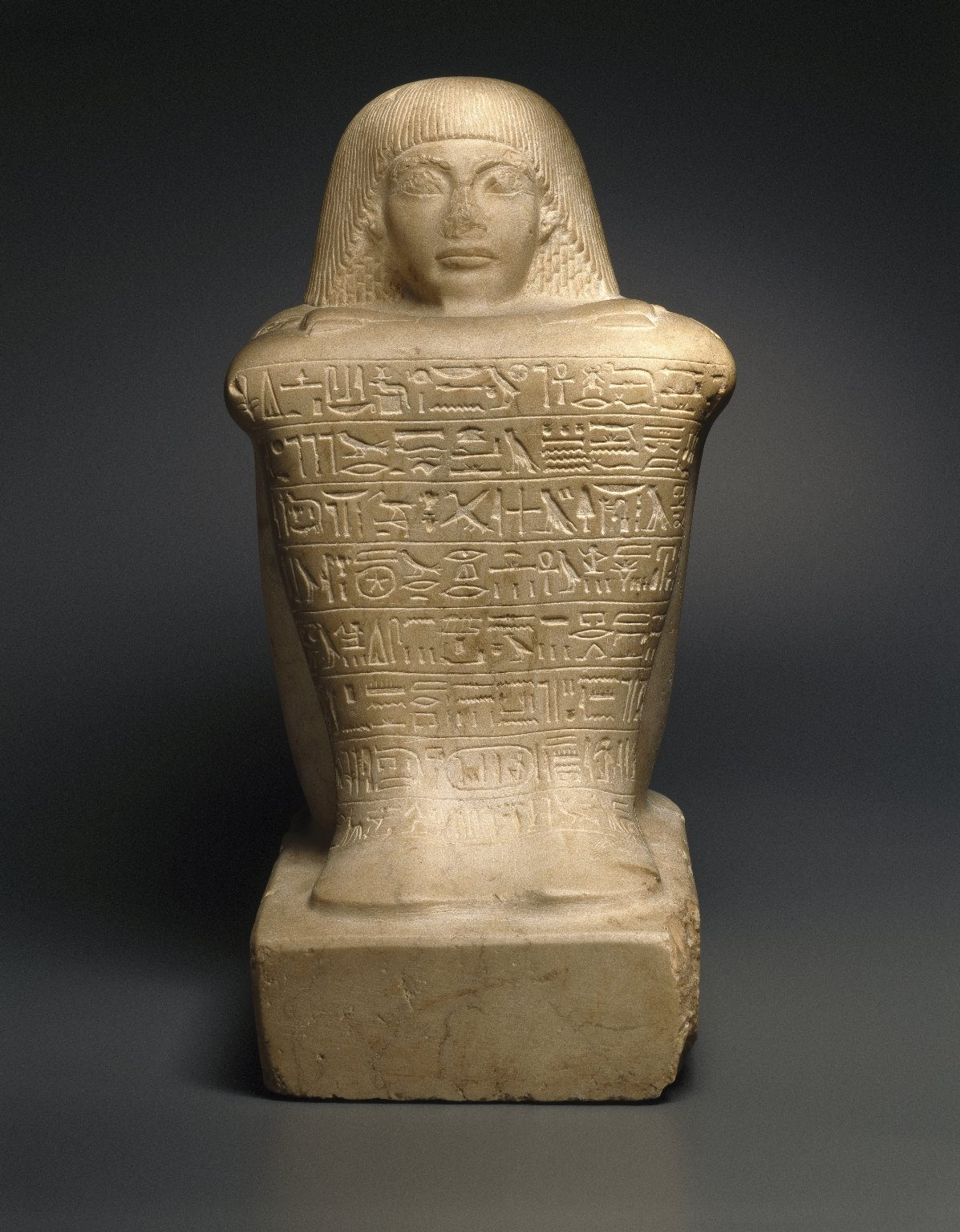
Block Statue of the Second Prophet of Amun Ay, c. 1336–1327 BC, 66.174.1, Brooklyn Museum

The last two members of the Eighteenth Dynasty—Ay and Horemheb—became rulers from the ranks of officials in the royal court, although Ay might also have been the maternal uncle of Akhenaten as a fellow descendant of Yuya and Tjuyu.

Ay may have married the widowed Great Royal Wife and presumed half-sister of Tutankhamun, Ankhesenamun, in order to obtain power; she did not live long afterward, with Ay instead ascending to the throne with his long-time wife Tey, who was originally Nefertiti's wet-nurse.

Ay's reign was short. His successor was Horemheb, a general who appeared to have been Tutankhamun's heir presumptive, and whose wife Mutnedjmet might have been sister of the former queen Nefertiti. It is possible that Horemheb took throne away from Ay in a coup d'état. Although Ay's son or stepson Nakhtmin was named as his father/stepfather's Crown Prince, Nakhtmin seems to have died during the reign of Ay, leaving the opportunity for Horemheb to claim the throne next.

Horemheb also died without surviving children, having appointed his vizier, Pa-ra-mes-su, as his heir. This vizier ascended the throne in 1292 BC as Ramesses I, and was the first pharaoh of the Nineteenth Dynasty.

This example to the right depicts a man named Ay who achieved the exalted religious positions of Second Prophet of Amun and High Priest of Mut at Thebes. His career flourished during the reign of Tutankhamun, when the statue was made. The cartouches of King Ay, Tutankhamun's successor appearing on the statue, were an attempt by an artisan to "update" the sculpture.

=== Relations with Nubia ===
The Eighteenth Dynasty empire conquered all of Lower Nubia under Thutmose I. By the reign of Thutmose III, the Egyptians directly controlled Nubia to the Nile river, 4th cataract, with Egyptian influence / tributaries extending beyond this point. The Egyptians referred to the area as Kush and it was administered by the Viceroy of Kush. The 18th dynasty obtained Nubian gold, animal skins, ivory, ebony, cattle, and horses, which were of exceptional quality. The Egyptians built temples throughout Nubia. One of the largest and most important temples was dedicated to Amun at Jebel Barkal in the city of Napata. This Temple of Amun was enlarged by later Egyptian and Nubian Pharaohs, such as Taharqa.

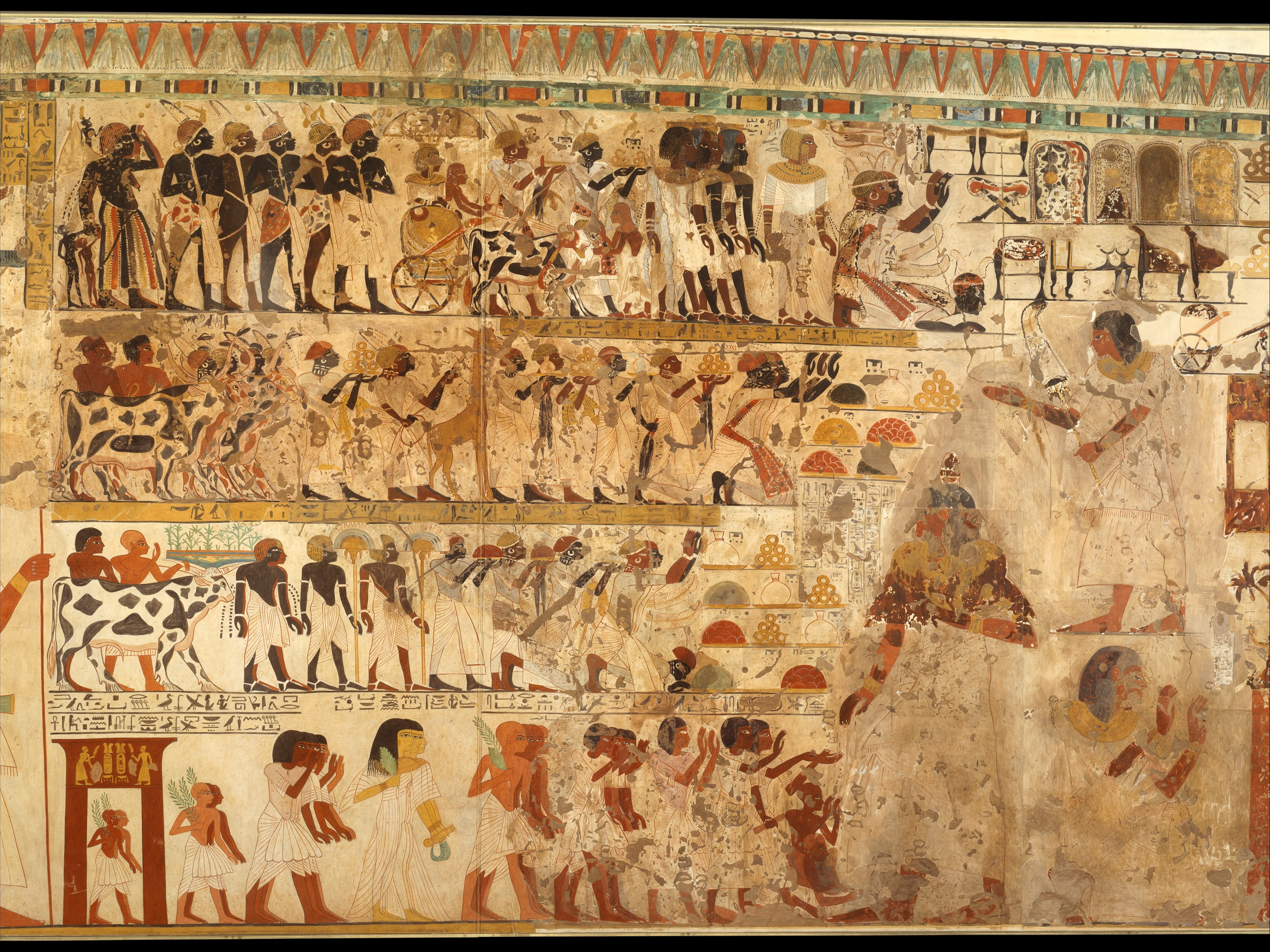
Nubian Tribute Presented to the King, Tomb of Huy MET DT221112

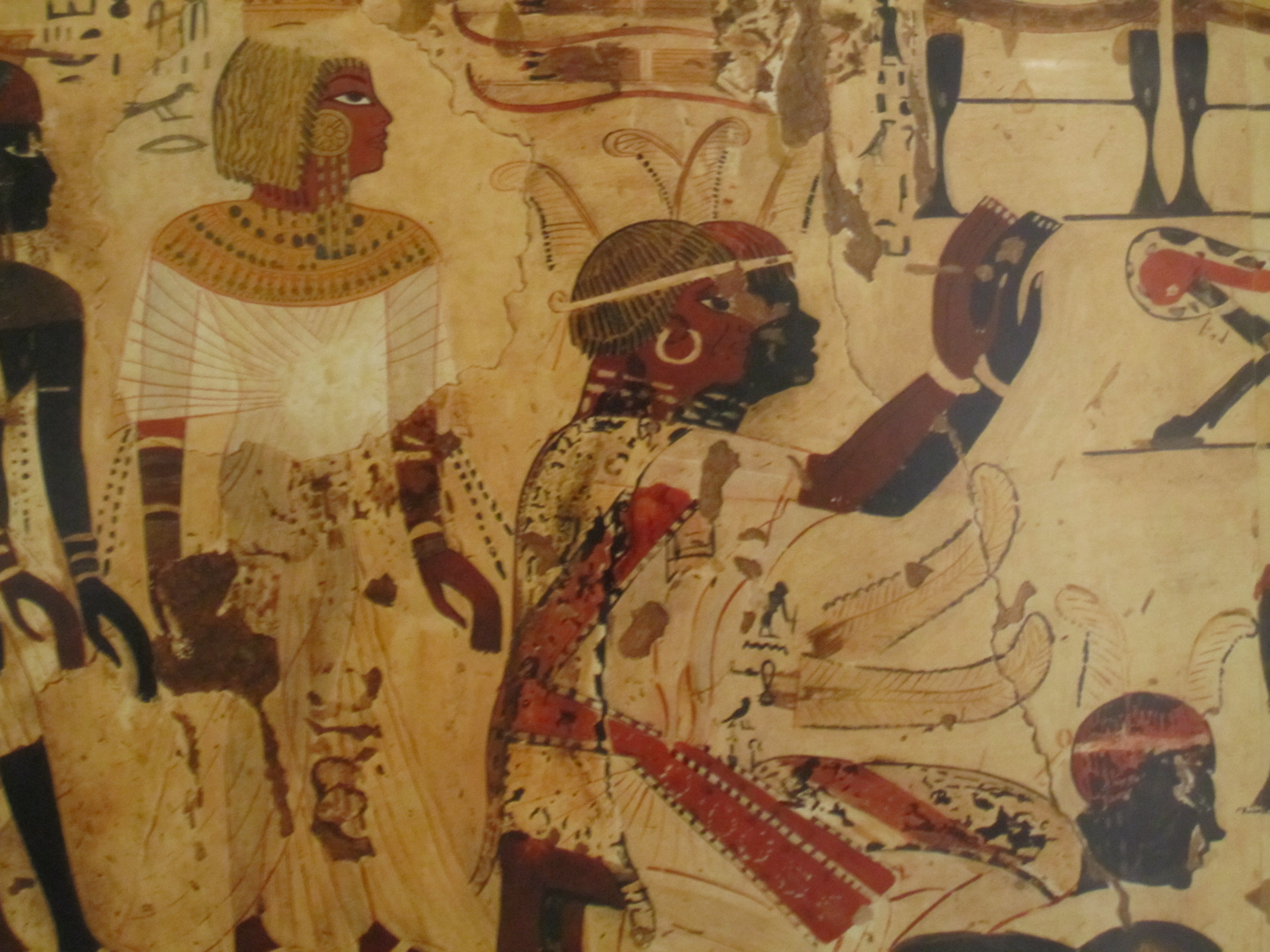
Nubian Prince Heqanefer bringing tribute for King Tutankhamun, 18th dynasty, Tomb of Huy

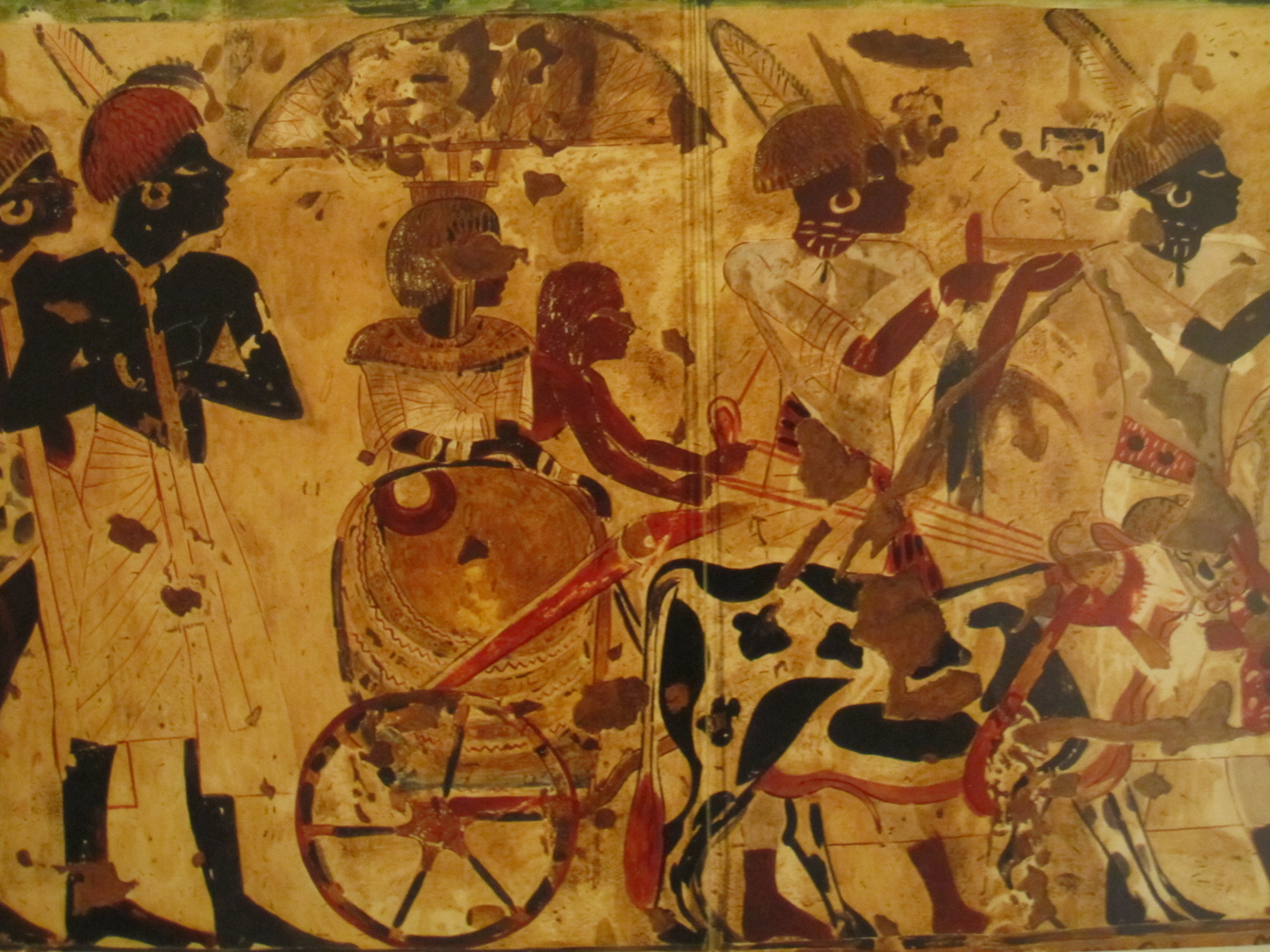
Nubians bringing tribute for King Tutankhamun, Tomb of Huy

=== Relations with the Near-East ===
After the end of the Hyksos period of foreign rule, the Eighteenth Dynasty engaged in a vigorous phase of expansionism, conquering vast areas of the Near-East, with especially Pharaoh Thutmose III submitting the "Shasu" Bedouins of northern Canaan, and the land of Retjenu, as far as Syria and Mittani in numerous military campaigns circa 1450 BC.

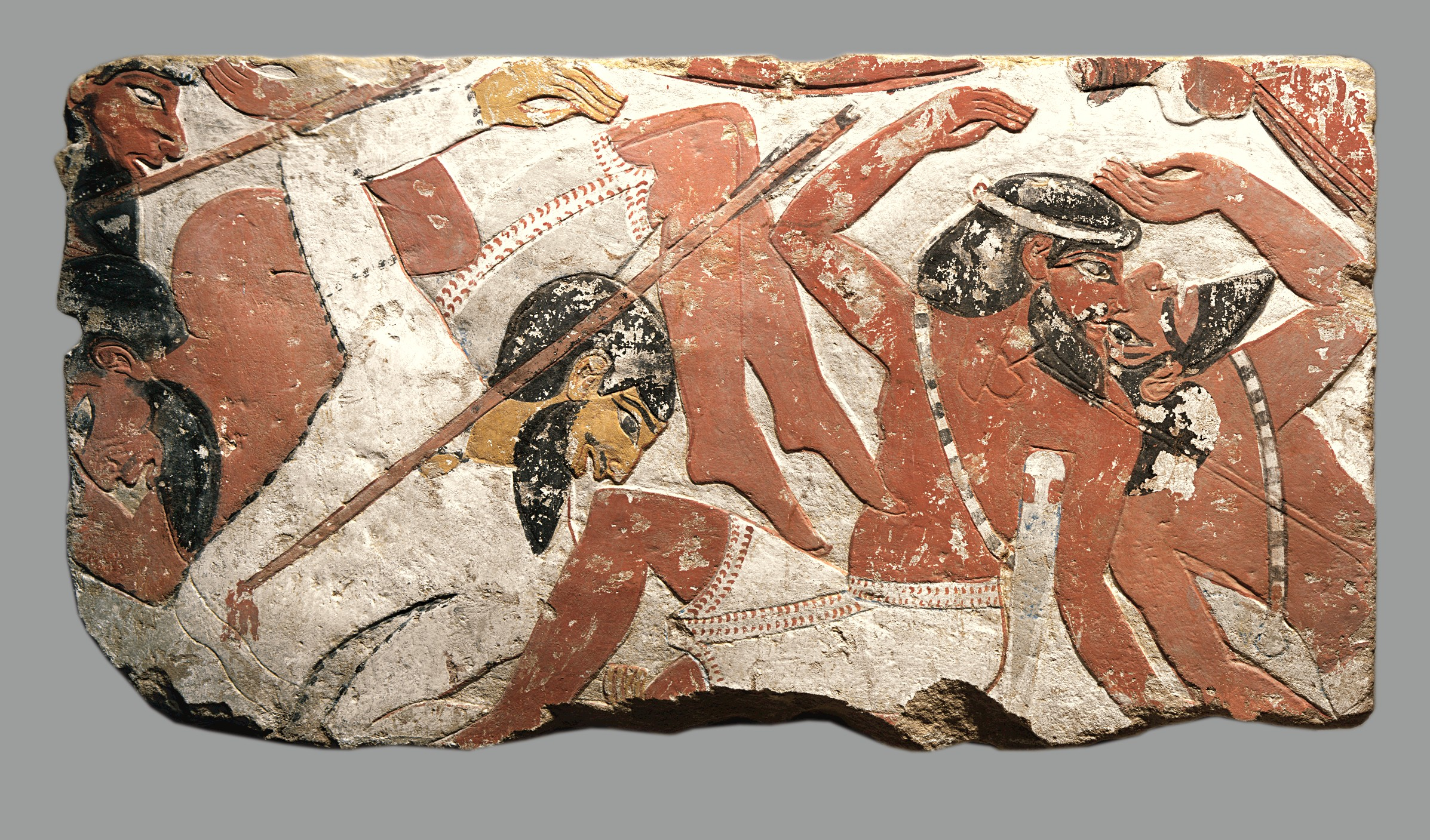
Egyptian relief depicting a battle against West Asiatics. Reign of Amenhotep II, Eighteenth Dynasty, c. 1427–1400 BC

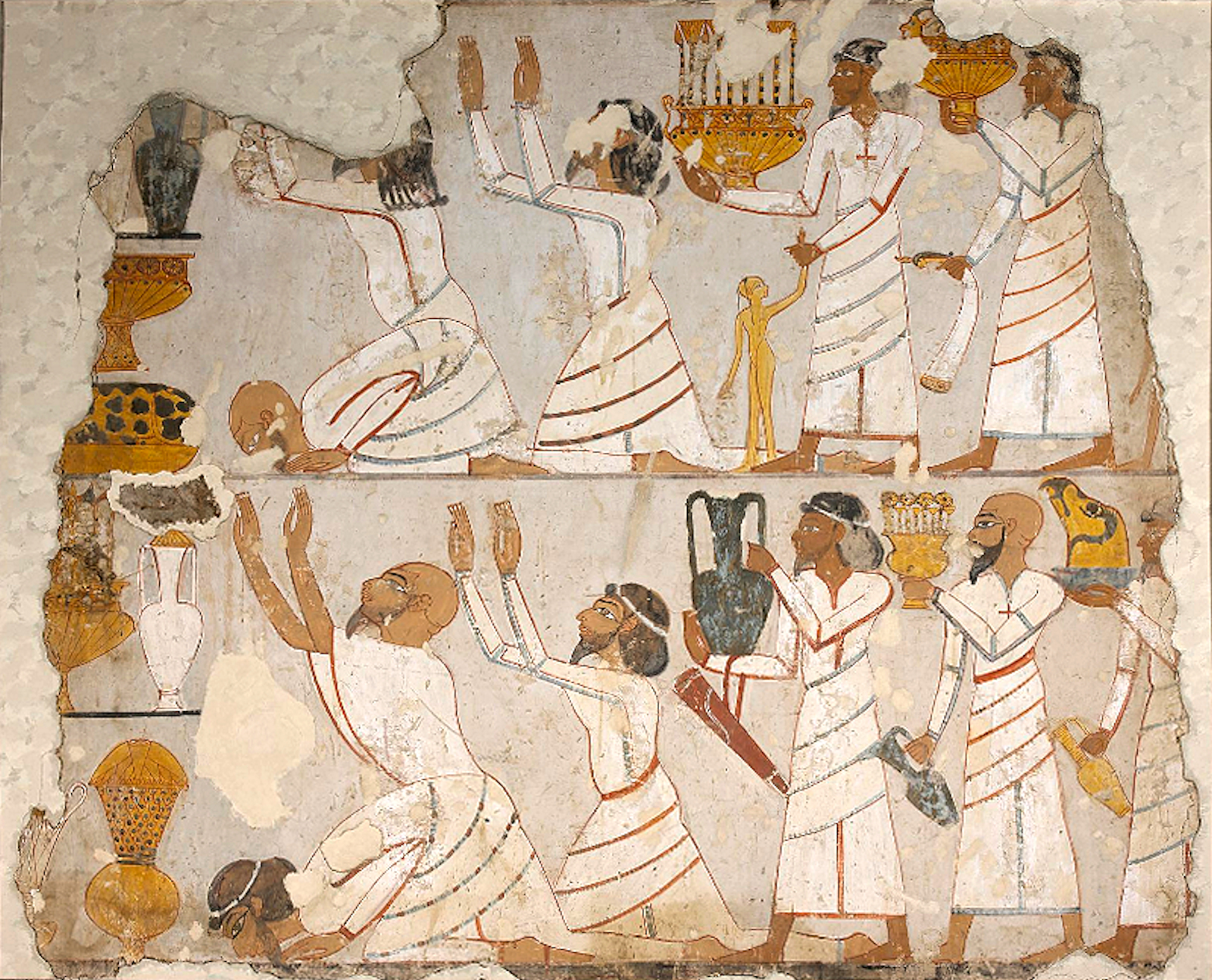
West Asiatic tribute bearers in the tomb of Sobekhotep, c. 1400 BC, Thebes. British Museum

== Dating ==
Radiocarbon dating suggests that Dynasty XVIII may have started a few years earlier than the conventional date of 1550 BC. The radiocarbon date range for its beginning is 1570–1544 BC, the mean point of which is 1557 BC.

== Anthropological and genetic data ==
A 1973 X-ray examination of southern king, Seqenenre Tao, by American Egyptologists, Kent Weeks and James E. Harris identified cranial similarities between his cranio-facial complex along with other Nubian and Old Kingdom Giza Skulls. In their view, this was supportive of scholarly interpretations that Sequenre Tao and his family may have held Nubian ancestry.

Robins and Shute (1983) performed X-ray measurements on the physical proportions of Upper Egyptian rulers such as Thutmose III, Amenhotep III, Tutankhamun. The authors reported that the limbs of the pharaohs, like those of other Ancient Egyptians, had "negroid characteristics", in that the distal segments were relatively long in comparison with the proximal segments. An exception was Ramesses II, who appears to have had short legs below the knees.

James Harris and Fawzia Hussien (1991) conducted an X-ray survey on southern based 18th dynasty royal mummies and examined the mummified remains of Thutmose II. The results of the study determined that the mummy of Thutmose II had a craniofacial trait measurement that was common among Nubian populations.

A genetic study, published in 2020, revealed Tutankhamun had the haplogroups YDNA R1b, which originated in western Asia and which today makes up 50–60% of the genetic pool of modern Europeans, and mtDNA K, which originated in the Near East. He shares this Y-haplogroup with his father, the KV55 mummy (Akhenaten), and grandfather, Amenhotep III (and his entire male ancestral line), and his mtDNA haplogroup with his mother, The Younger Lady, his grandmother, Tiye, and his great-grandmother, Thuya (and his entire female ancestral line). The profiles for Tutankhamun and Amenhotep III were incomplete, and the analysis produced differing probability figures despite having concordant allele results. Because the relationships of these two mummies with the KV55 mummy had previously been confirmed in an earlier study, the haplogroup prediction of both mummies could be derived from the full profile of the KV55 data.

In 2022, S.O.Y. Keita analysed 8 Short Tandem loci (STR) data originally published by Hawass et al. in studies from 2010 and 2012. The first of these studies had investigated familial relationships among 11 royal mummies of the New Kingdom, which included Tutankhamun and Amenhotep III, as well as potential inherited disorders and infectious diseases. The second of these studies had investigated the Y-haplogroups and genetic kinship of Ramesses III and an unknown man buried along with him in the royal cache at Deir el Bahari. Keita analysed the STR data from these studies using an algorithm that only has three choices: Eurasians, sub-Saharan Africans, and East Asians. Using these three options, Keita concluded that the majority of the samples had a population "affinity with 'sub-Saharan' Africans in one affinity analysis". However, Keita cautioned that this does not mean that the royal mummies "lacked other affiliations", which he argued had been obscured in typological thinking. Keita further added that different "data and algorithms might give different results", reflecting the complexity of biological heritage and the associated interpretation.

According to historian William Stiebling and archaeologist Susan N. Helft, (2023) conflicting DNA analysis on recent genetic samples such as the Amarna royal mummies has led to a lack of consensus on the genetic makeup of the ancient Egyptians and their geographic origins.

In 2025, biochemist Jean-Philippe Gourdine reviewed genetic data on the Ancient Egyptian populations in the international scholarly publication, General History of Africa Volume IX. Expanding on a previous STR analysis co-performed with Keita, on the Amarna royal mummies which included Tutankhamun, Gourdine stated the analysis had found "that they had strong affinities with current sub-Saharan populations: 41 per cent to 93.9 per cent for sub-Saharan Africa, compared to 4.6 per cent to 41 per cent for Eurasia and 0.3 per cent to 16 per cent for Asia (Gourdine, 2018)." He also referenced comparable analysis conducted by DNA Tribes company, which specialized in genetic genealogy and had large datasets, with the latter having identified strong affinities between the Amarna royal mummies and Sub-Saharan African populations.

In 2025, Christopher Ehret, David Schoenbrun, Steven A Brandt and Shomarka Keita issued a multidisciplinary review, noting the R1b M89 haplogroup subtype identified among the three Amarna pharaohs (Tutankhamun, Amenhotep III and Akhenaten) was not further specified. The authors also stated that the R1b haplogroup usually interpreted as indicating a back migration to Africa from or via the Near East could have been attributed to Asian back migration or trans-Saharan connections as the genetic marker is found at relative high frequencies among Chadic populations. Referencing a Short Tandem Report (STR) autosomal background analysis on the Amarna royal mummies, performed by Keita in an earlier publication, the authors considered this analysis could suggest closer trans-Saharan connections. Ehret et al. also disclosed through personal communication with the Gad team that "other eighteenth dynasty lineages in the Amarna period were found to be E1b1a (Gad et al 2020)". The authors further postulated that association of the palaeolithic Asian lineage (R1B) and an affiliation that is tropical African (E1b1a) is an example of admixture found in some Nile Valley populations, and that a mixture of lineages could illustrate Egypt being near a crossroads.

== Pharaohs of the 18th Dynasty ==
The pharaohs of the 18th Dynasty ruled for approximately 250 years (c. 1550–1298 BC). The dates and names in the table are taken from Dodson and Hilton. Many of the pharaohs were buried in the Valley of the Kings in Thebes (designated KV). More information can be found on the Theban Mapping Project website. Several diplomatic marriages are known for the New Kingdom. These daughters of foreign kings are often only mentioned in cuneiform texts and are not known from other sources. The marriages were likely to have been a way to confirm good relations between these states. Royal brother-sister marriages were observed, as a means to strengthen the royalty by echoing the practices in their creation myths.

Dynasty XVIII Kings of Egypt
Pharaoh	Image	Prenomen (Throne name)	Horus-name	Reign	Burial	Consort(s)	Comments
Ahmose I / Ahmosis I	"head of Ahmose I"	Nebpehtire	Aakheperu	1550–1525 BC	Dra' Abu el-Naga'?	Ahmose-Nefertari; Ahmose-Henuttamehu; Ahmose-Sitkamose	
Amenhotep I	"Amenhotep I seated"	Djeserkare	Kauwaftau	1525-1506 BC	Tomb ANB? or KV39?	Ahmose-Meritamon	
Thutmose I	"head of Thutmose I"	Aakheperkare	Kanakhtmerymaat	1506-1493 BC	KV20, KV38	Ahmose; Mutnofret	
Thutmose II		Aakheperenre	Kanakhtuserpehty	1493–1479 BC	Wadi C-4	Hatshepsut; Iset	
Thutmose III		Menkheper(en)re	Kanakhtkhaemwaset	1479–1425 BC	KV34	Satiah; Merytre-Hatshepsut; Nebtu; Menhet, Menwi and Merti	
Hatshepsut		Maatkare	Useretkau	1479–1458 BC (de facto); 1478/1472–1458 (de jure)	KV20	Thutmose II (before reign)	
Amenhotep II		Aakheperure	Kanakhtwerpehty	1427–1401 BC	KV35	Tiaa	
Thutmose IV	"head of Thutmose IV"	Menkheperure	Kanakhttutkhau	1401-1391 BC	KV43	Nefertari; Iaret; Mutemwiya; Daughter of Artatama I of Mitanni	
Amenhotep III		Nebmaatre	Kanakhtkhaemmaat	1391–1353 BC	KV22	Tiye; Gilukhipa of Mitanni; Tadukhipa of Mitanni; Sitamun; Iset; Daughter of Kurigalzu I of Babylon; Daughter of Kadashman-Enlil of Babylon; Daughter of Tarhundaradu of Arzawa; Daughter of the ruler of Ammia	
Amenhotep IV/Akhenaten	"head of Amenotep IV"	Neferkepherure-Waenre	Kanakhtqaishuti (originally); Meryaten (later)	1353-1336 BC	Royal Tomb of Akhenaten, KV55 (?)	Nefertiti; Kiya; Tadukhipa of Mitanni; Daughter of Šatiya, ruler of Enišasi; Meritaten? Meketaten? Ankhesenamun; Daughter of Burna-Buriash II, King of Babylon	
Smenkhkare	"painting of Smenkhkare"	Ankhkheperure	(unknown)	1336-1334 BC	KV55 (?)	Meritaten	
Neferneferuaten		Ankhkheperure-Akhet-en-hyes	(unknown)	1334–1332 BC		Akhenaten? Smenkhkare?	Usually identified as Queen Nefertiti
Tutankhamun	"mask of Tutankhamun"	Nebkheperure	Kanakhttutmesut	1332–1323 BC	KV62	Ankhesenamun	
Ay		Kheperkheperure	Kanakhttjehenkhau	1323–1319 BC	KV23	Tey; Ankhesenamun?	
Horemheb	"head of Horemheb"	Djeserkheperure-Setepenre	Kanakhtsepedsekheru	1319–1292 BC	KV57	Amenia (before reign); Mutnedjmet	

== Comparison of regnal lists ==
The Eighteenth Dynasty is well-recorded across Egyptian king lists, mostly due to being written extensively by their Nineteenth Dynasty successors. The Abydos, Saqqara and Ramesseum king lists, all from the New Kingdom of Egypt, provide a list of kings of this dynasty and are in broad agreement on the order of most kings in this dynasty, though they omit Hatshepsut and the Amarna pharaohs as a form of damnatio memoriae; the repudiation of Hatshepsut and the Amarna Period had been state policy since the reign of Horemheb. A Theban tomb, TT19, also provides a king list. It is possible the Turin King List originally listed the Eighteenth Dynasty, but it is now in a fragmentary state and some information is lost, including a section that contained Dynasties 18–19/20. Manetho's now-lost work Aegyptiaca also provided individual reign lengths, however the lengths seem to be inaccurate since his sources were likely already corrupted due to the damnatio memoriae imposed over the Amarna rulers, and co-regency may have caused additional confusion. Later Epitomes of the work were then misunderstood by various writers who conflated multiple kings into a single figure, failed to understand the number of kings in this dynasty.

Historical Pharaoh	TT2	TT19	Abydos King List	Fragmentary Abydos King List	Saqqara King List	Ramesseum King List	Manetho
Ahmose I	Nebpehtire	Nebpehtire	Nebpehtire	Nebpehtire	Nebpehtire	Nebpehtire	Amosis
Amenhotep I	Djeserkare	Djeserkare	Djeserkare	Djeserkare	Djeserkare	Djeserkare	Ammenophis
Thutmose I		Aakheperkare	Aakheperkare	Aakheperkare	Name lost	Aakheperkare	Misaphris
Thutmose II		Aakheperenre	Aakheperenre	Aakheperenre	Name lost	Aakheperenre	Chebron
Hatshepsut		Omitted	Omitted	Omitted	Omitted	Omitted	Amenssis
Thutmose III		Menkheperre	Menkheperre	Menkheperre	Name lost	Menkheperre	Mesphragmouthosis
Amenhotep II		Aakheperure	Aakheperure	Aakheperure	Name lost	Aakheperure	Amenophis
Thutmose IV		Menkheperure	Menkheperure	Menkheperure	Name lost	Menkheperure	Tuthmosis
Amenhotep III		Nebmaatre	Nebmaatre	Nebmaatre	Name lost	Nebmaatre	Amenophis
Akhenaten		Omitted	Omitted	Omitted	Omitted	Omitted	Akhenkherses
Smenkhkare		Omitted	Omitted	Omitted	Omitted	Omitted	Omitted
Neferneferuaten		Omitted	Omitted	Omitted	Omitted	Omitted	Omitted
Tutankhamun		Omitted	Omitted	Omitted	Omitted	Omitted	Rathos
Ay		Omitted	Omitted	Omitted	Omitted	Omitted	Armais
Horemheb		Djeserkheperure Setepenre	Djeserkheperure Setepenre	Djeserkheperure Setepenre	Djeserkheperure Setepenre	Djeserkheperure Setepenre	Oros

== Gallery of images ==
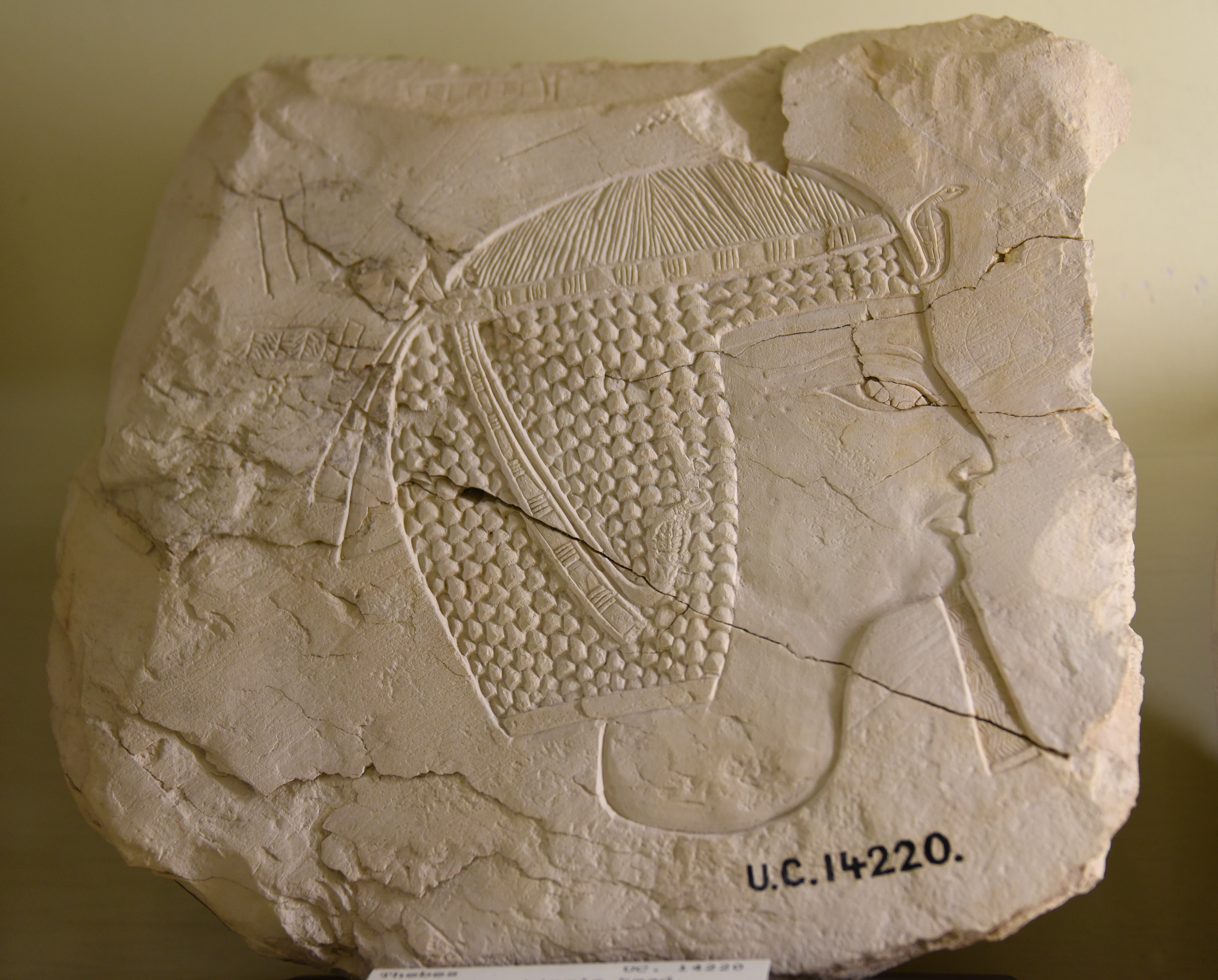
Trial piece showing a head of an unknown king in profile. Uraeus on forehead. Limestone relief. 18th Dynasty. From Thebes, Egypt. The Petrie Museum of Egyptian Archaeology, London

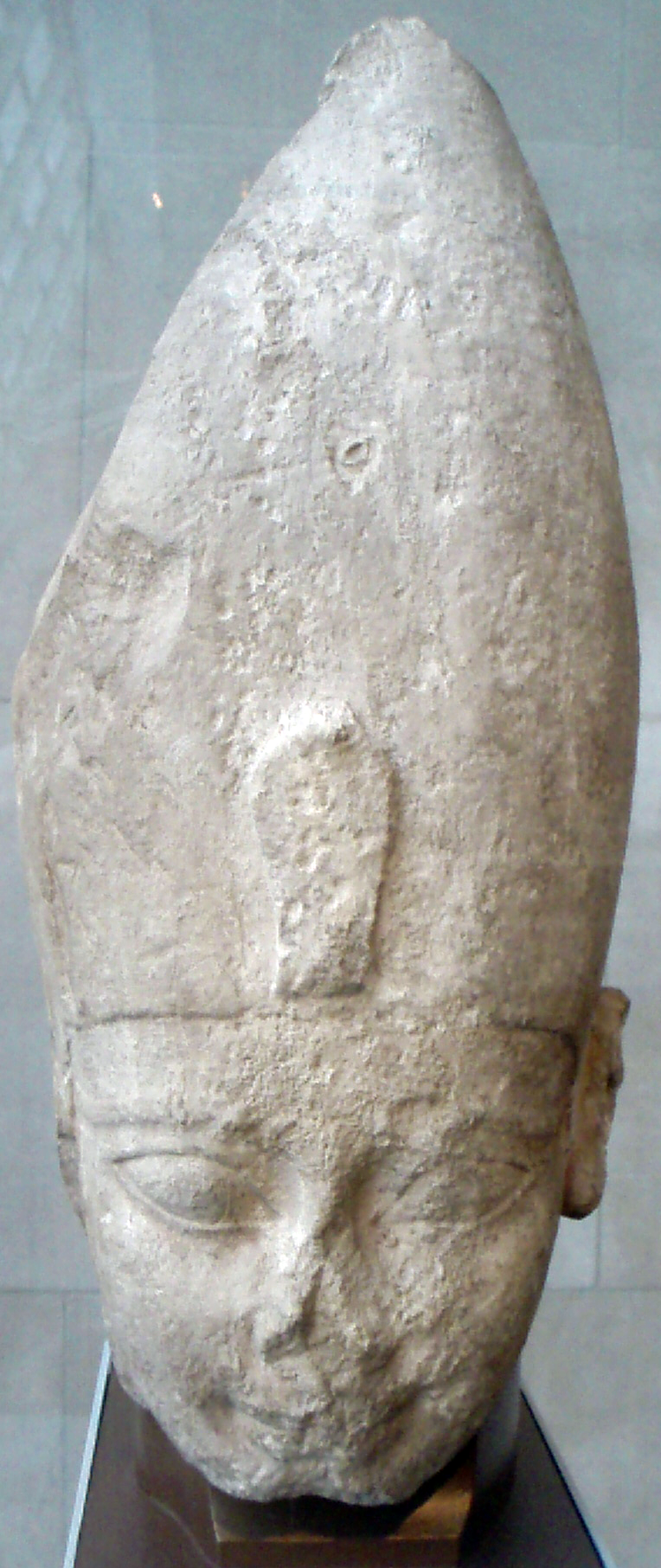
Ahmose I. Though he was called the founder of the 18th dynasty, he was the brother of Kamose, the last pharaoh of the 17th dynasty. During his reign, he expelled the Hyksos from Lower Egypt and brought the Nile Delta under his control, politically unifying Egypt once again.

Amenhotep I gained the throne after his two elder brothers had died. He was the son of Ahmose and Ahmose-Nefertari. He was succeeded by Thutmose I who married his daughter, Ahmose.

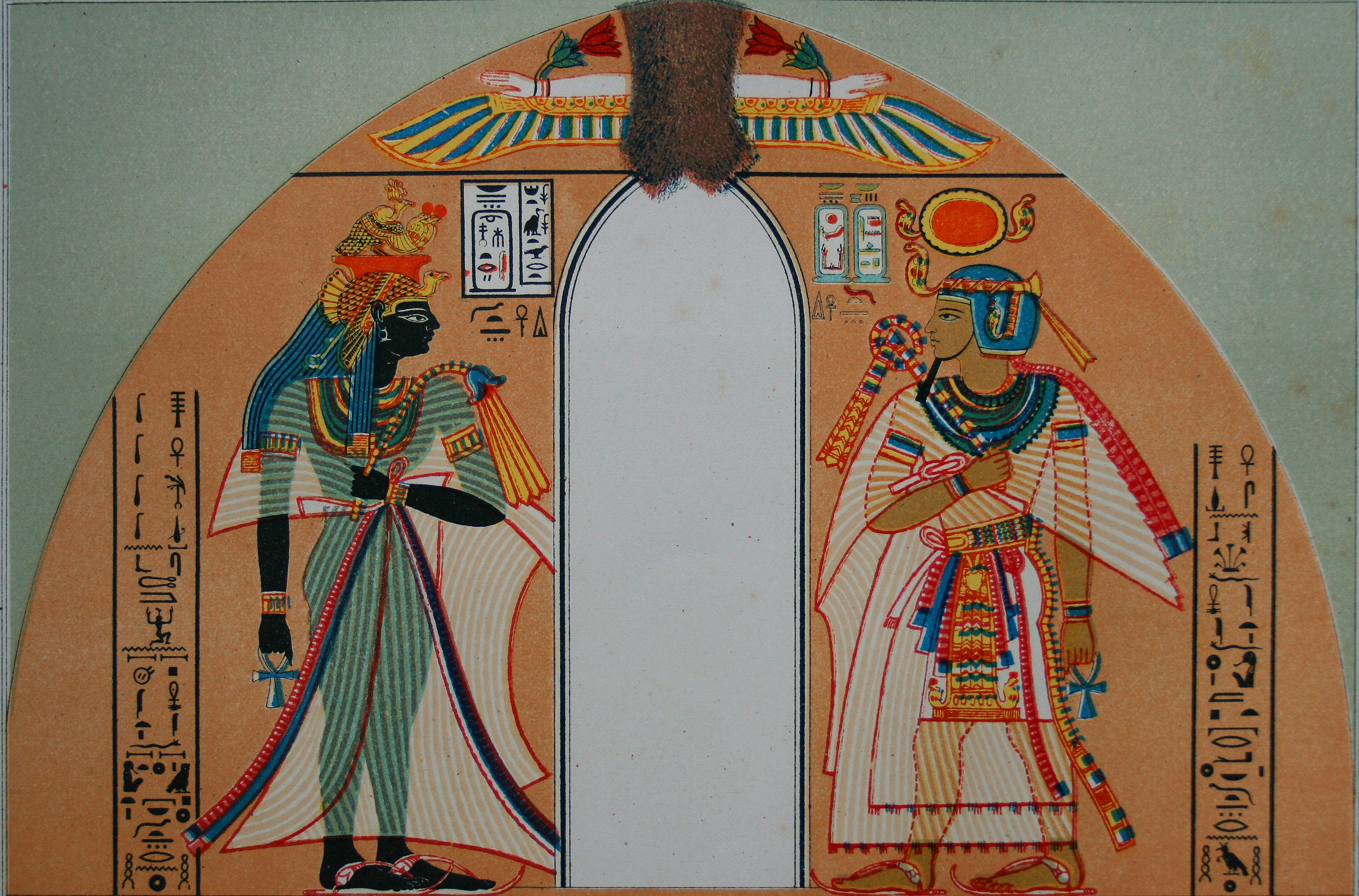
Amenhotep I with his mother, Ahmose-Nefertari. Both royals are credited with opening a workmen's village at Deir el-Medina. Deir el-Medina housed the artisans and workers of the pharaohs tombs in the Valley of the Kings, from the 18th to 21st dynasties. Amenhotep I and his mother were deified and were the village's principal gods.

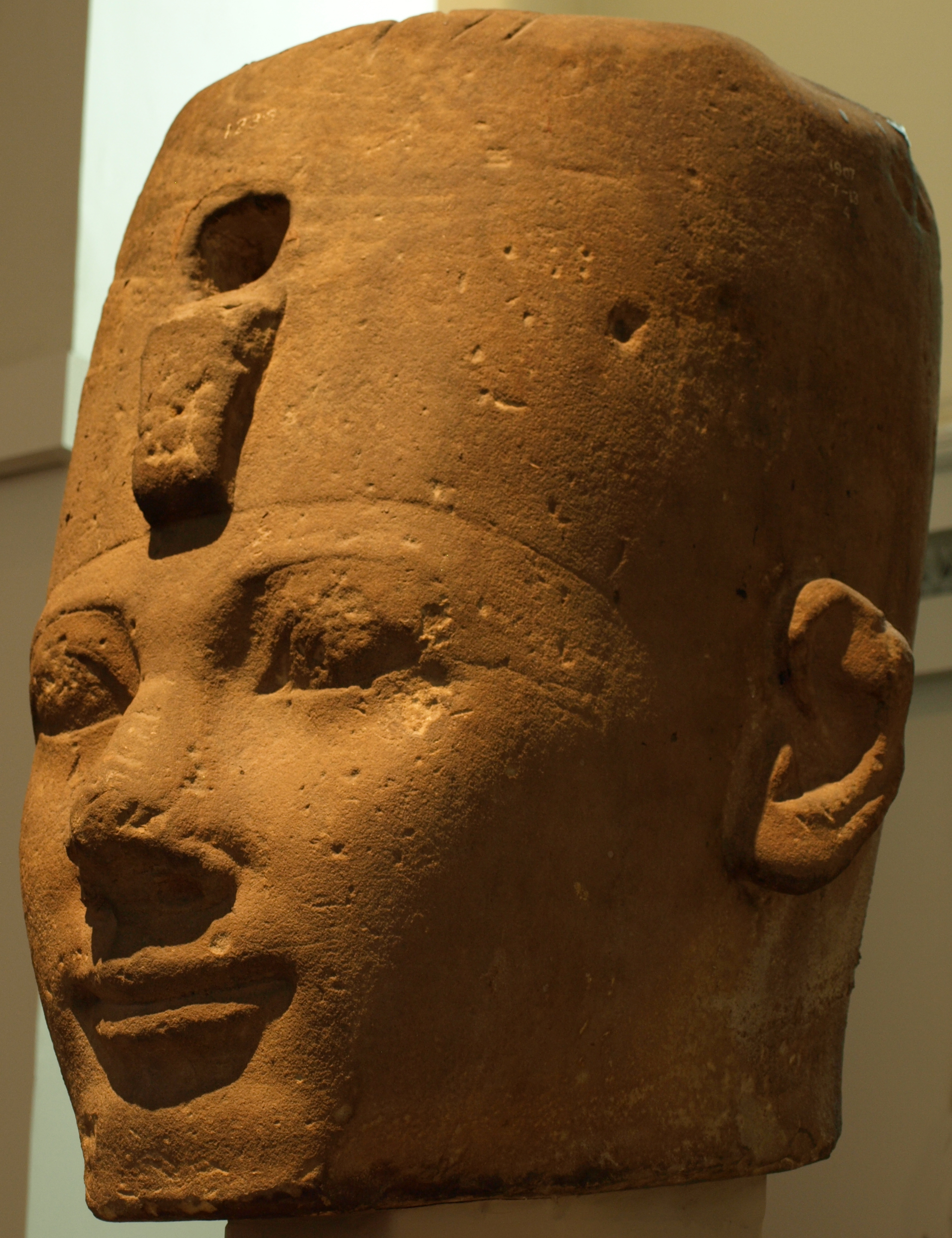
Thutmose I. A military man, he came to power by marrying the sister of Amenhotep I, or may have been his son to a secondary wife. During his reign, he pushed the borders of Egypt into Nubia and the Levant. He is credited with the starting the building projects in what is now the temple of Karnak.

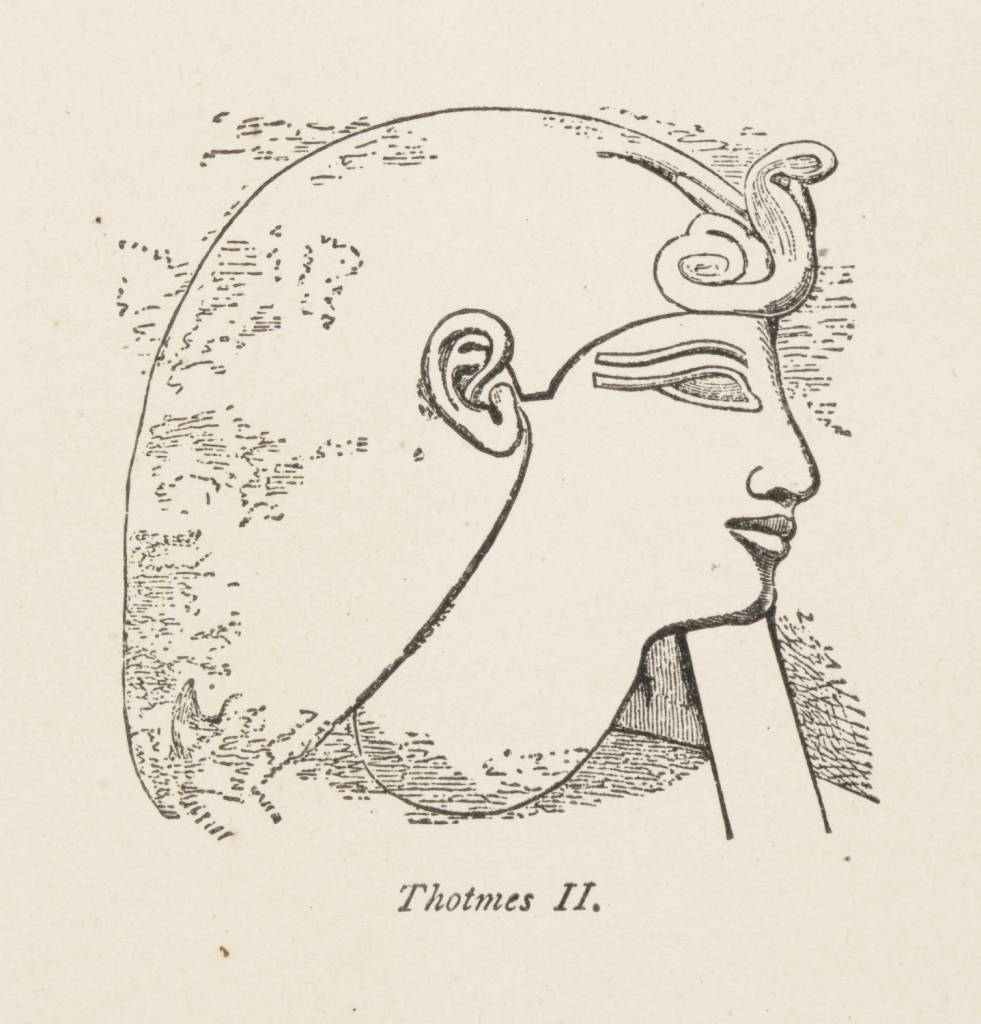
Sketch from temple relief of Thutmose II. Considered a weak ruler, he was married to his sister Hatshepsut. He named Thutmose III, his son as successor, but Thutmose III was too young to rule at his father's death and thus his stepmother Hatshepsut was his regent. Hatshepsut and Thutmose II had a daughter, Neferure.

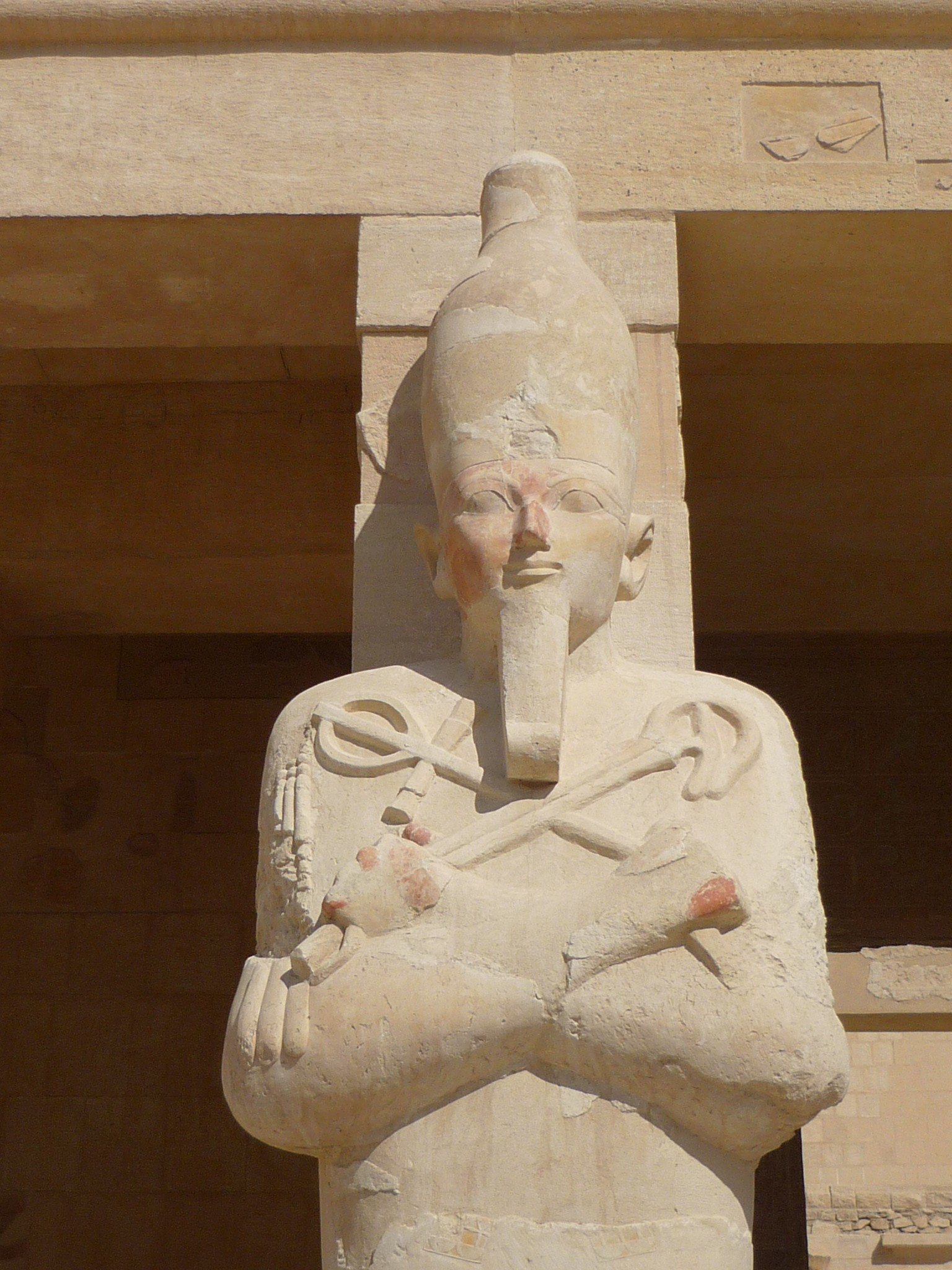
Hatshepsut. Daughter of Thutmose I, she ruled jointly as her stepson Thutmose III's co-regent. She was the second known female pharaoh of Egypt, after Sobekneferu of 12th Dynasty.

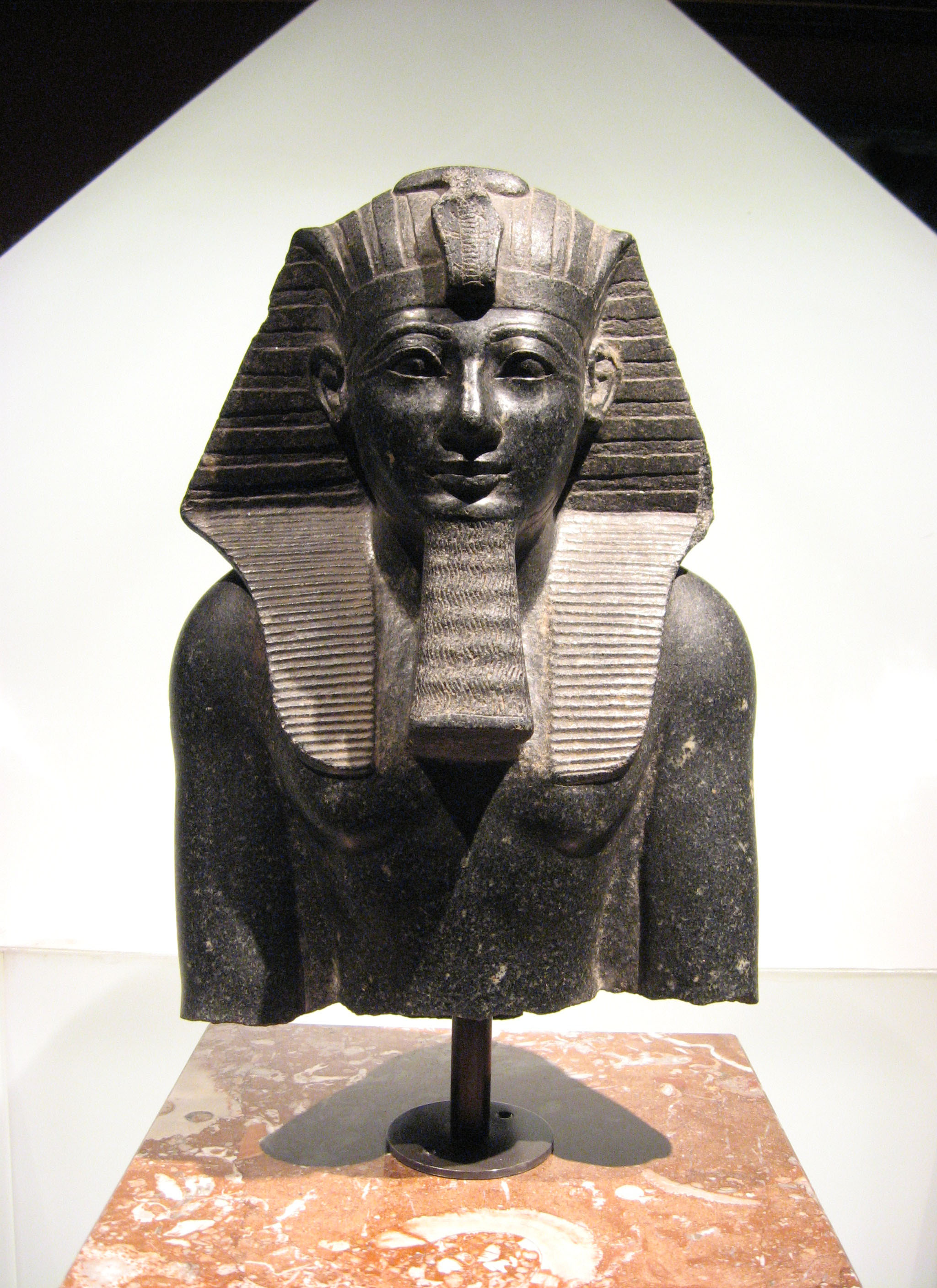
Thutmosis III, a military man and member of the Thutmosid royal line is commonly called the "Napoleon of Egypt". His conquests of the Levant brought Egypt's territories and influence to its greatest extent. He also built numerous monuments, most famously his Festival Hall and "botanical garden" at Karnak, and ordered the construction of the city of Napata in Nubia.

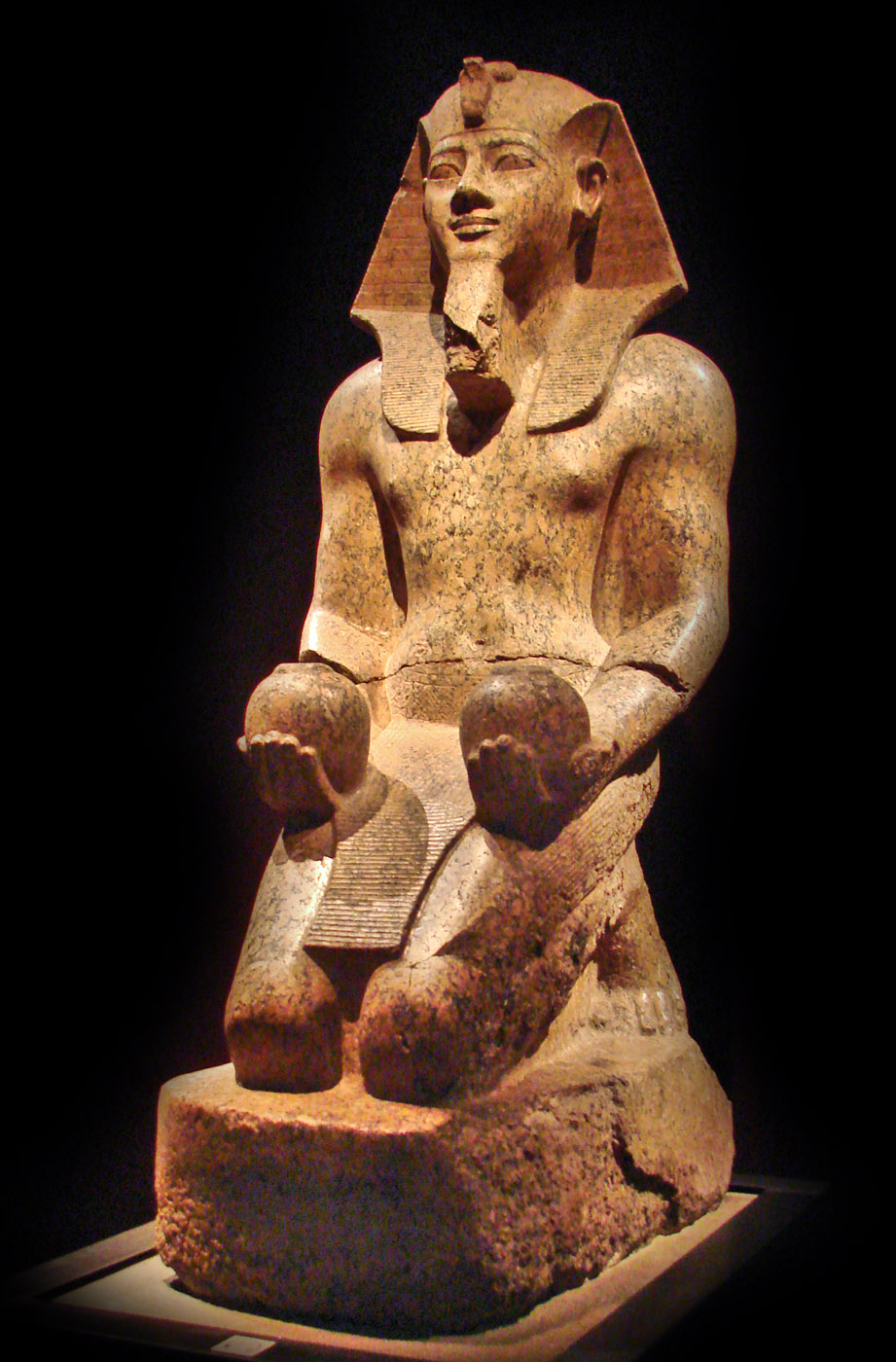
Amenhotep II.

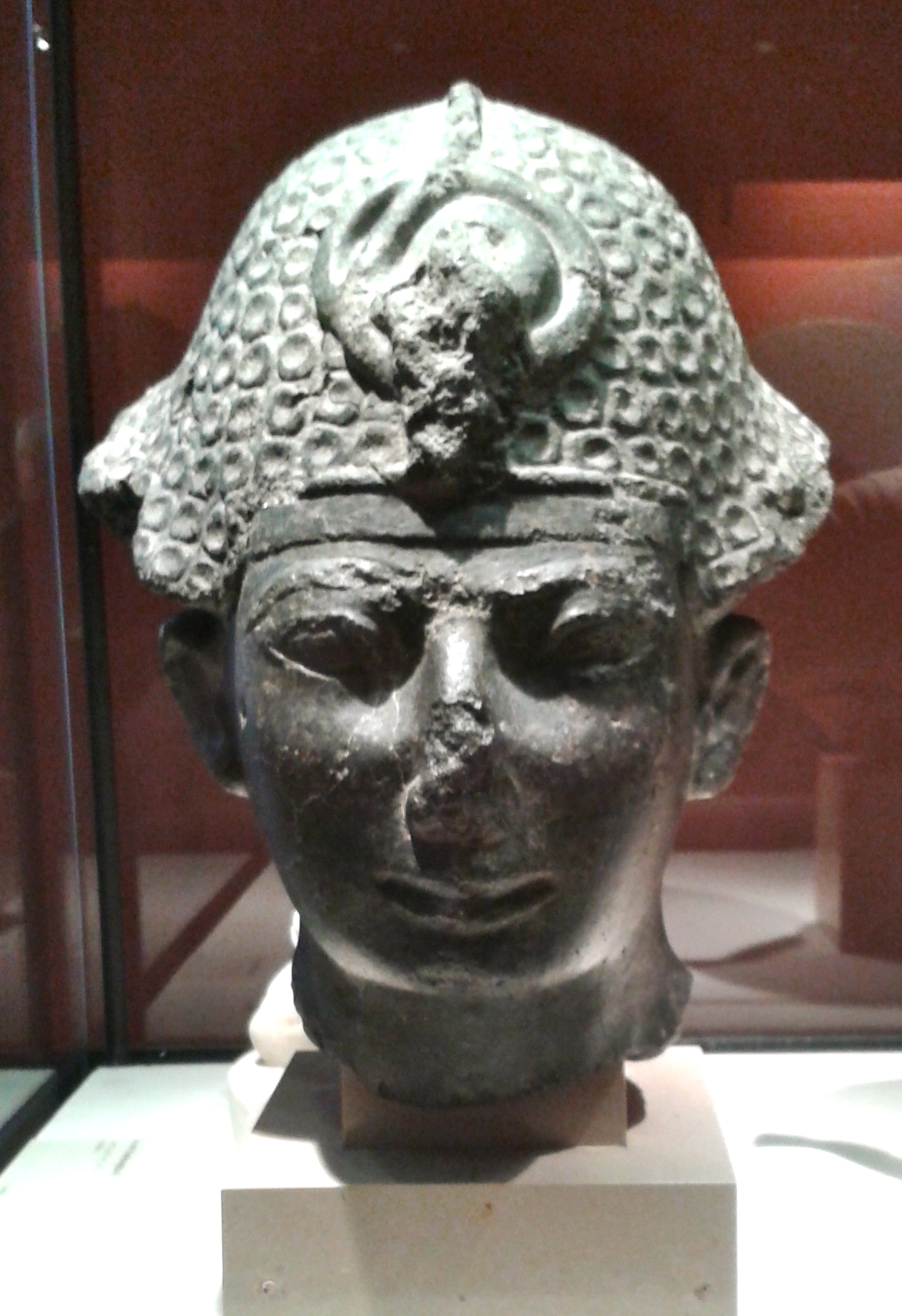
Thutmosis IV.

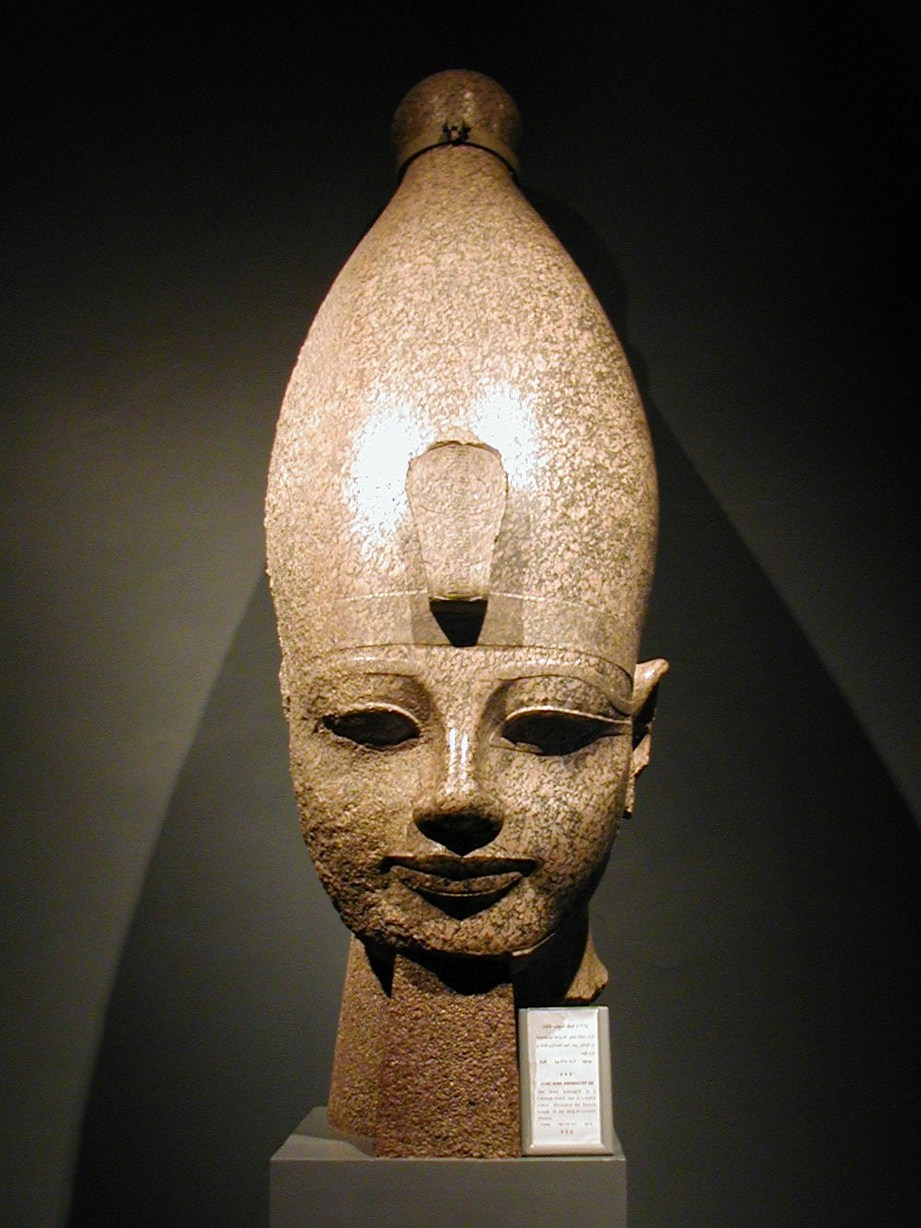
Amenhotep III, whose long reign over Egypt found it at the height of its imperial splendor. He built numerous monuments, including the palace of Malqata, the Colossi of Memnon, and extensive expansions of the Temples of Karnak and Luxor, and has more surviving statutes than any other ancient Egyptian monarch.

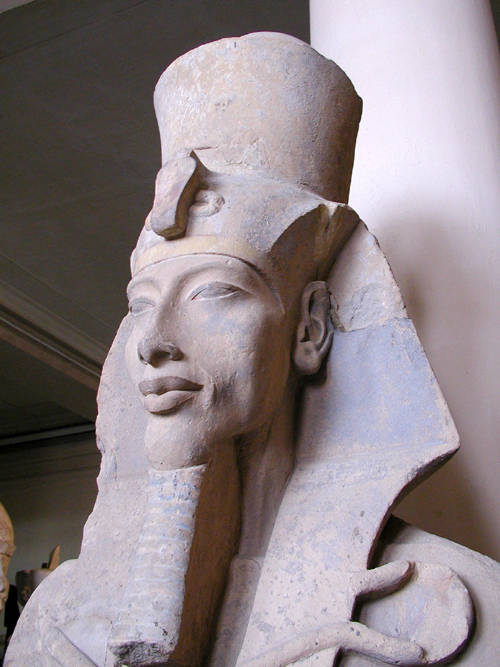
Akhenaten, initially Amenhotep IV, began a religious revolution in which he declared Aten was a supreme god and turned his back on the old traditions. He moved the capital to Akhetaten.

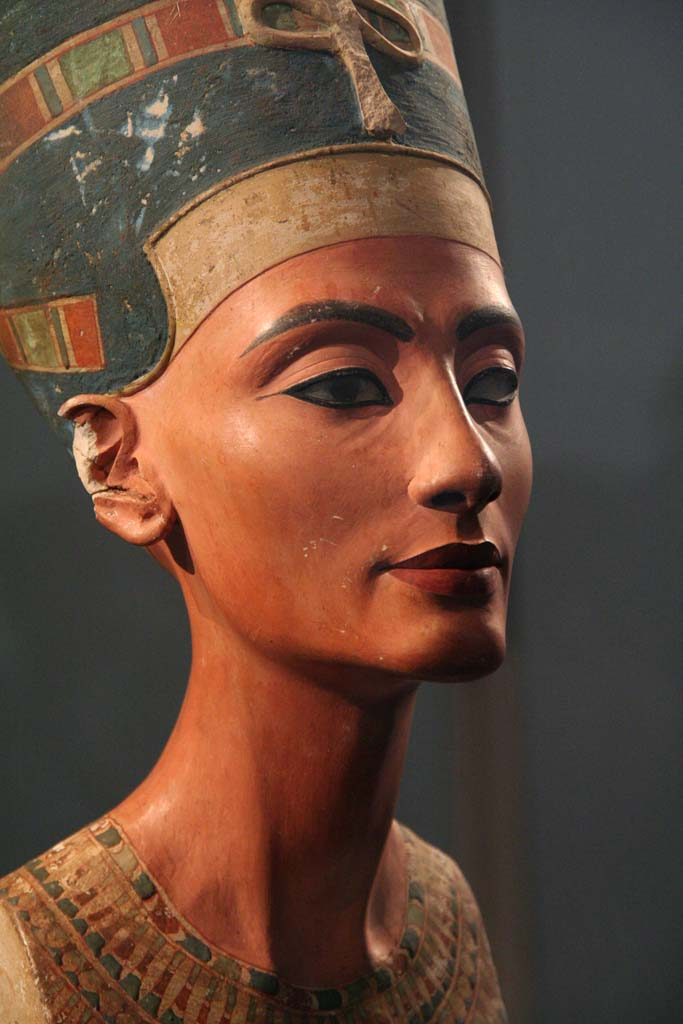
Queen Nefertiti, possibly the daughter of Ay, married Akhenaten. Her role in daily life at the court might have extended from Great Royal Wife to that of a co-regent. It is also possible that she may have ruled Egypt in her own right as pharaoh Neferneferuaten.

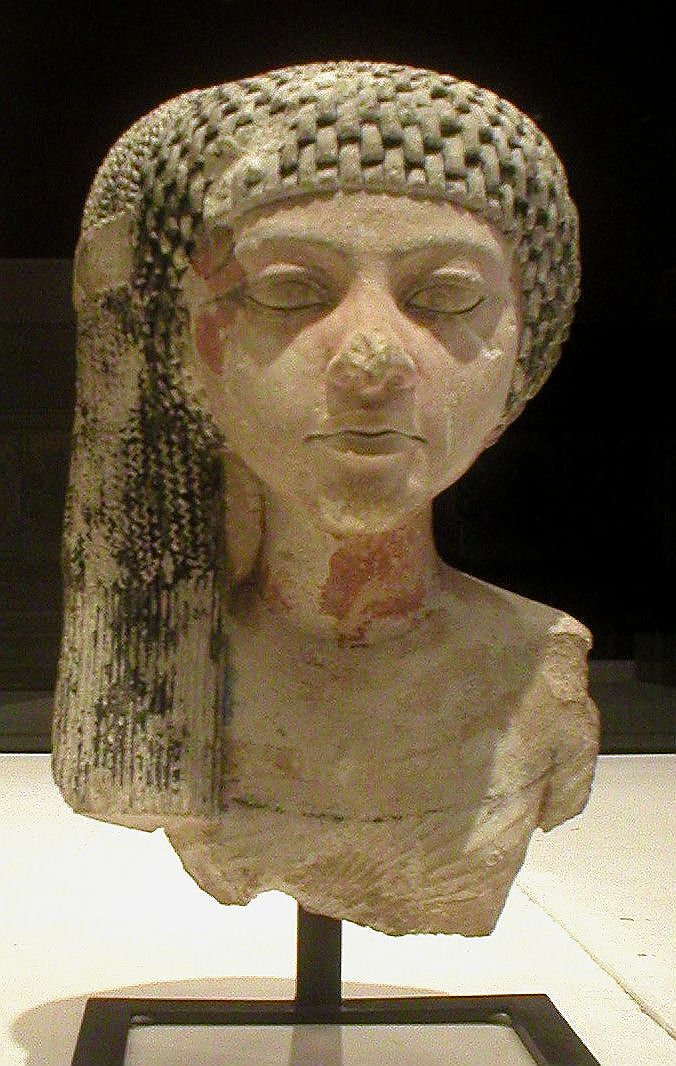
Queen Meritaten, was the eldest daughter of Akhenaten and Nefertiti. She was the wife of Smenkhkare. She also may have ruled Egypt in her own right as pharaoh and is one of the possible candidates of being the pharaoh Neferneferuaten.

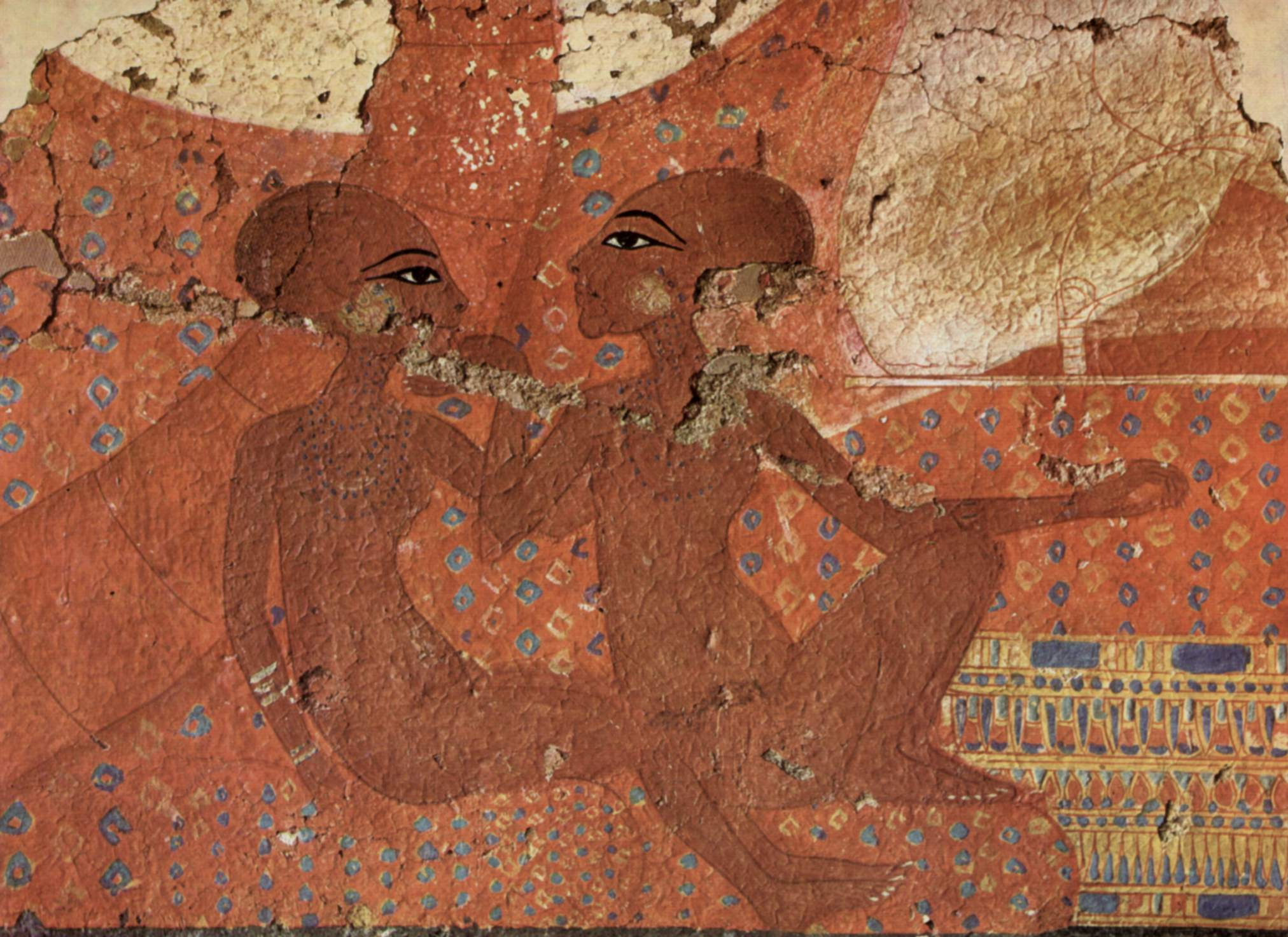
Neferneferure and Neferneferuaten Tasherit. Shown here as children, they were two of six daughters born to Akhenaten and Nefertiti. It is possible that Neferneferuaten Tasherit was the one who may have been her father's co-regent and may have ruled as the female pharaoh, Neferneferuaten.

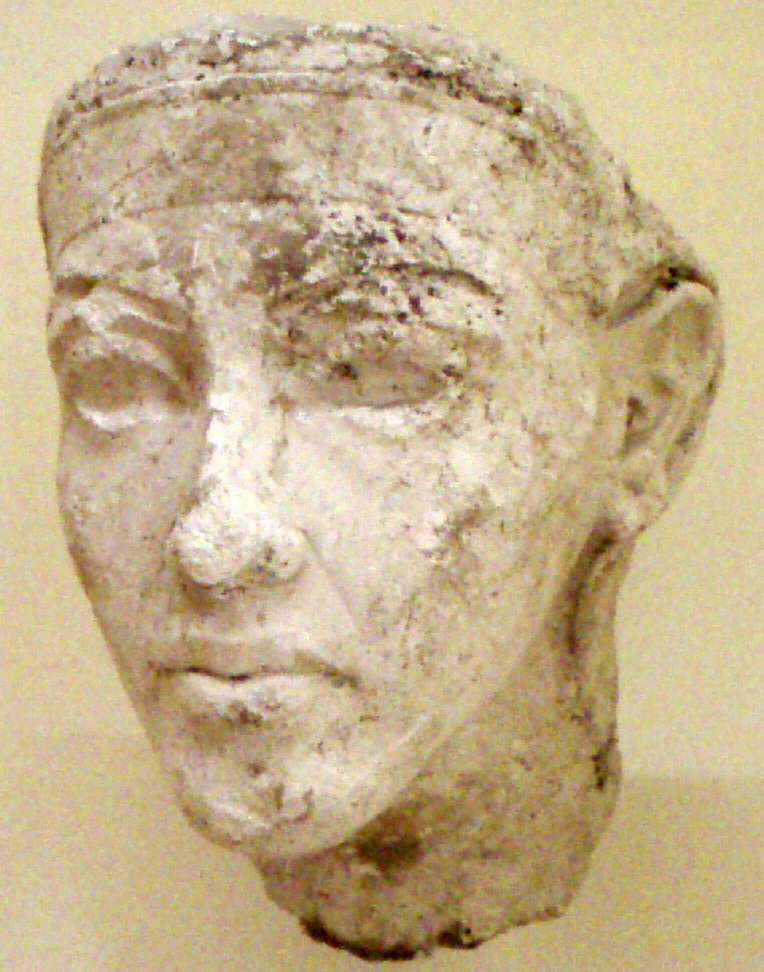
Smenkhkare, co-regent or successor of Akhenaten. Speculated to be either Akhenaten's male relative or former queen Nefertiti under different name. Married to Meritaten.

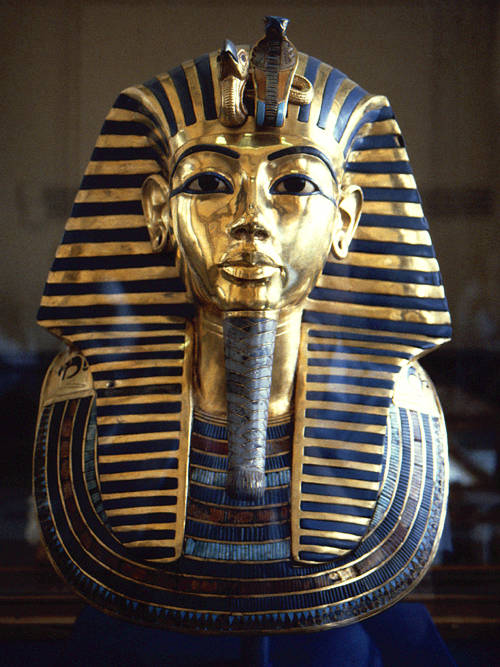
Tutankhamun, born Tutankhaten, is presumed to be son of Akhenaten. As pharaoh, he instigated policies to restore Egypt to its old religion and moved the capital away from Akhetaten.

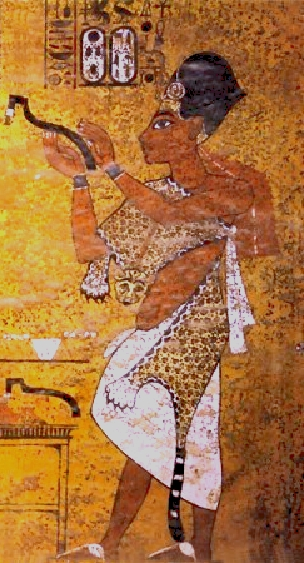
Ay served as a high official to Akhenaten, and a vizier to Tutankhamun. He may have been the father of Nefertiti. After the death of Tutankhamun, Ay laid a claim to the throne by burying him and marrying Tutankhamun's wife Ankhesenamun.

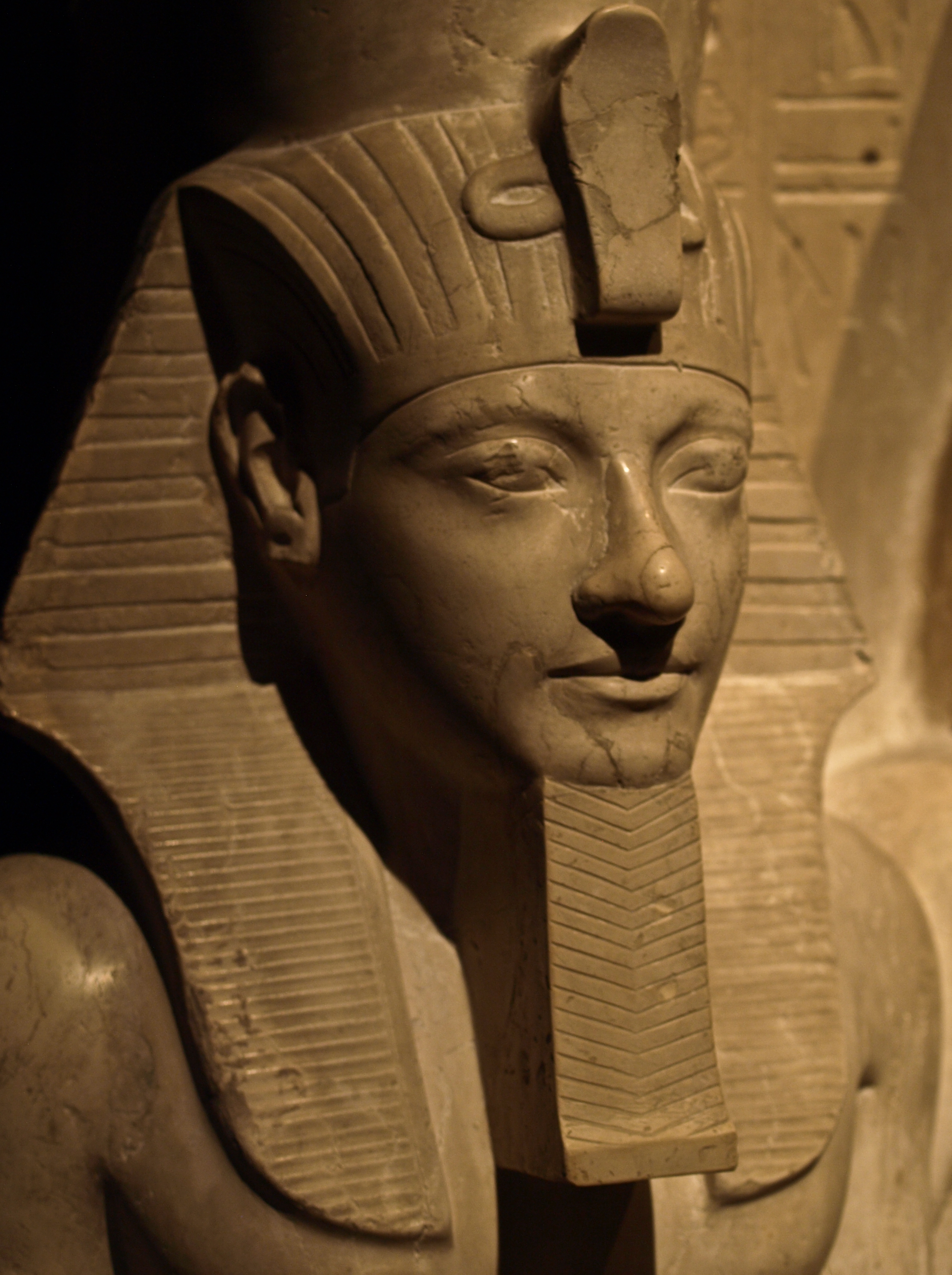
After the death of Ay, Horemheb assumed the throne. A commoner, he had served as a military official to both Tutankhamun and Ay. Horemheb instigated a policy of damnatio memoriae, against everyone associated with the Amarna period. With no heir born to him, he appointed his own vizier, Paramessu as his successor.

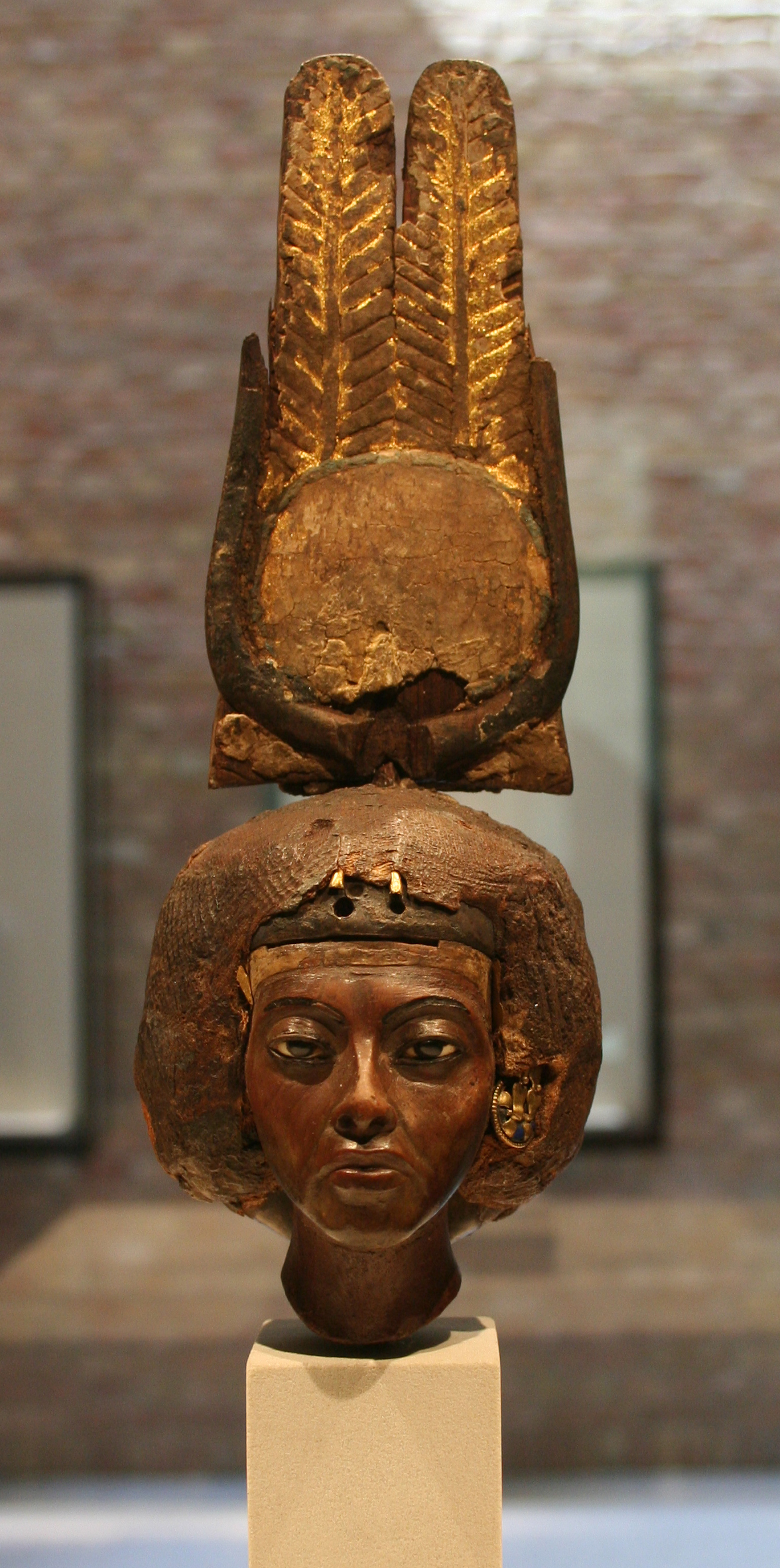
Tiye was the daughter of the court official Yuya. She married Amenhotep III, and became his principal wife. Her knowledge of government helped her gain power in her position and she was soon running affairs of state and foreign affairs for her husband, Amenhotep III and later her son, Akhenaten. She was also Tutankhamun's grandmother.

Senenu, High Priest of Amun at Deir El-Baḥri, grinding grain, c. 1352–1292 BC, Limestone, Brooklyn Museum.

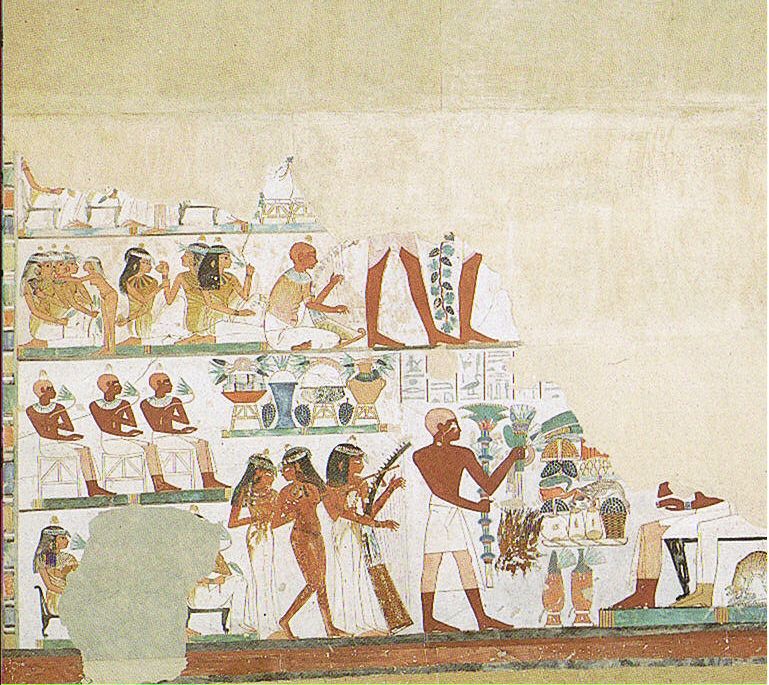
Beautiful Festival of the Valley (Celebration of the dead in Thebes)

== See also ==
- Egyptian chronology
- Eighteenth Dynasty of Egypt family tree

== Bibliography ==
- O'Connor, David; Cline, Eric (1998). Amenhotep III: Perspectives on His Reign. University of Michigan Press.
- de la Bédoyère, Guy (2023). Pharaohs of the Sun: The Rise and Fall of Tutankhamun's Dynasty. Pegasus Books. ISBN 9781639363063.
- Kozloff, Arielle; Bryan, Betsy (1992). Royal and Divine Statuary in Egypt's Dazzling Sun: Amenhotep III and his World. Cleveland.
- Kuhrt, Amélie (1995). The Ancient Near East: c. 3000–330 BC. London: Routledge. ISBN 9780415013536.
- Theban Maping project

Preceded by Seventeenth Dynasty	Dynasties of Egypt c. 1550 BC–1292 BC	Succeeded by Nineteenth Dynasty
