= TT56 =

Theban tomb

Theban tomb TT56
- Burial site of Userhat
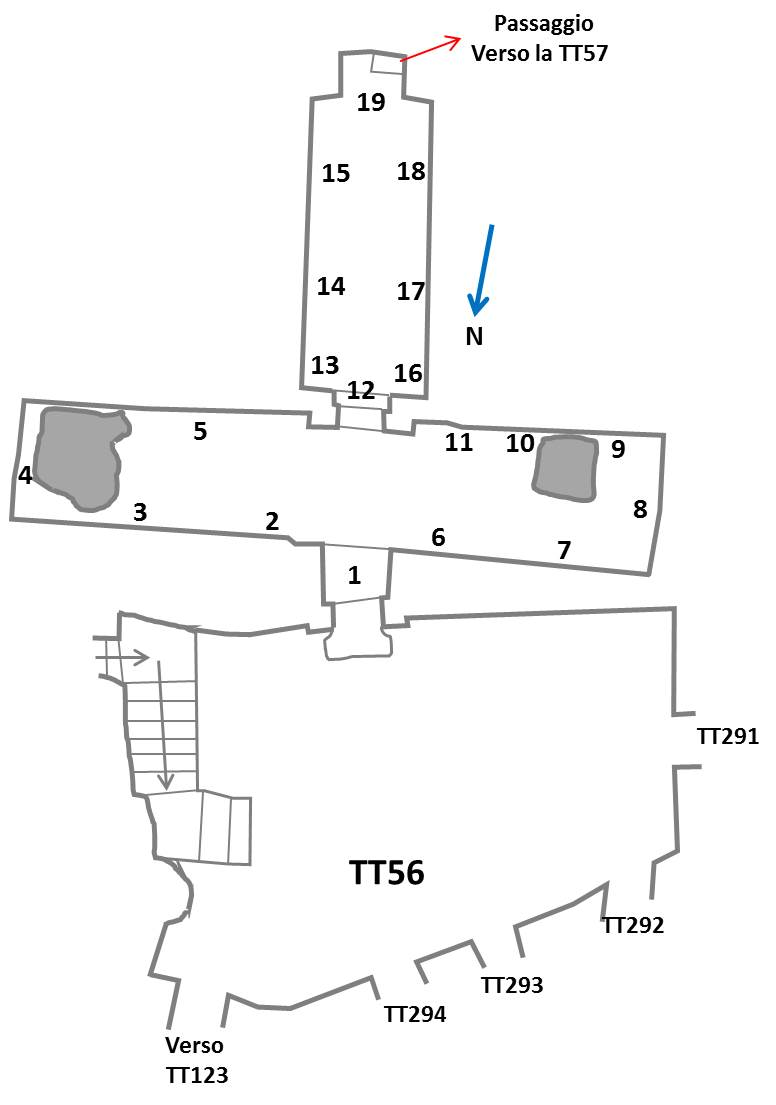
- Floor plan of TT56
- Location: Sheikh Abd el-Qurna, Theban Necropolis
- ← Previous; TT55 Next → TT57

F12 F4 t Z1
Userhat
in hieroglyphs
Era: New Kingdom
(1550–1069 BC)

The Theban Tomb TT56 is located in Sheikh Abd el-Qurna. It forms part of the Theban Necropolis, situated on the west bank of the Nile opposite Luxor. The tomb is the burial place of the ancient Egyptian official Userhat, who was the "Royal Scribe", "Overseer and Scribe of the Cattle of Amun", "Bread counting scribe in Upper and Lower Egypt", and "deputy Herald", during the 18th Dynasty king Amenhotep II and his wife Mutnefret. The TT56 is one of the best preserved Theban nobility tombs from Western Thebes and its paintings boast many vivid and brightly painted scenes depicting the deceased Userhat and Mutnefret receiving gifts and presents in the afterlife.

== Tomb TT56 ==
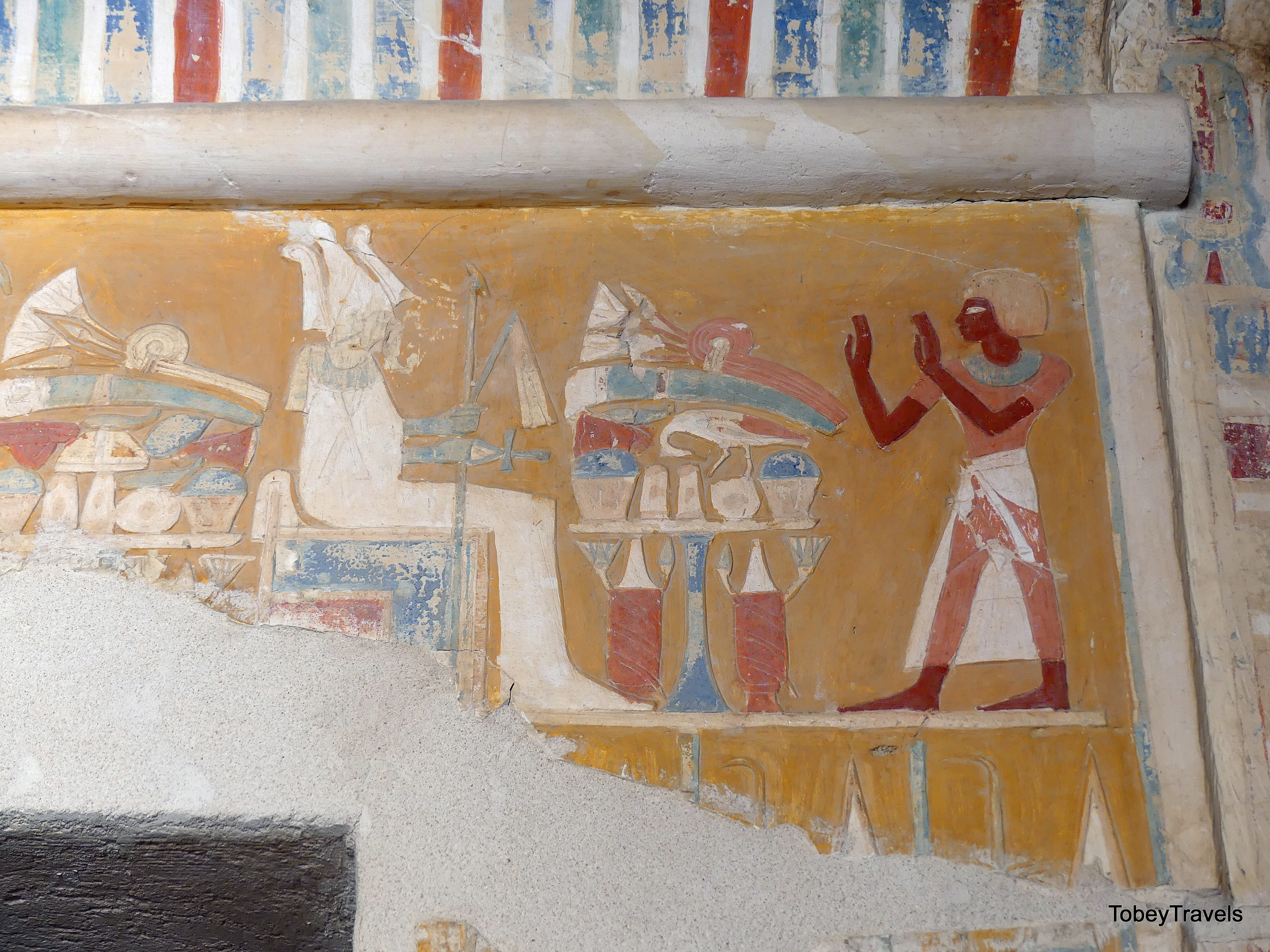
Userhat before Osiris in Tomb TT56

At the beginning of the 19th century, the tomb of Userhat was never mentioned by explorers of the Theban area; however, it must have already been known and visited in 1827, when John Gardner Wilkinson copied some inscriptions finding it blocked at the height of the musicians' scene. In 1843, Karl Richard Lepsius visited TT56 entering it from a breach which had opened in the nearby Tomb TT57, but for the tomb to be almost completely open it was necessary to wait until 1904 and Robert Mond. In 1932, consolidation and restoration works were carried out (but there are no publications of the works carried out) and, in 1956, further restoration works were necessary, carried out by Labib Habachi; the complete publication of the wall decorations of TT56 dates back to 1987, edited by Seeber and Ghaffar.

As for Tomb TT52, similar to this case there are dating problems since there are no other references to its owner except in the tomb itself. The plan and the style of the wall decorations seem, however, to indicate that it belongs to the reign of Amenhotep II. Robert Mond indicated the existence of a cartouche of Thutmose IV and the stylistic comparison with other tombs (TT172 of Mentiywi, Royal Steward, TT84 of Iamunedjeh, Royal Herald, and TT74 of Tjanumi) allowed Egyptologists to narrow down the period of its construction between the reigns of Amenhotep II and Thutmose IV.

Unlike other tombs of the 18th dynasty, the tomb of Userhat is completely decorated, although some paintings were not completed and some texts were not finished; apart from the black color, which has faded over time, the other colors are still vivid today. The damage suffered by the paintings and especially by the statuary was caused by earthquakes over the millennia, but also by the iconoclastic interventions from the Amarna period, with the erasure of the name of the god Amun, even in the names that this divinity contained, and of other divinities not in line with the doctrinal and religious dictates of Akhenaten. A second wave of vandalism of the wall paintings occurred with the Coptic monks who occupied the tomb and altered some paintings by adding crosses.

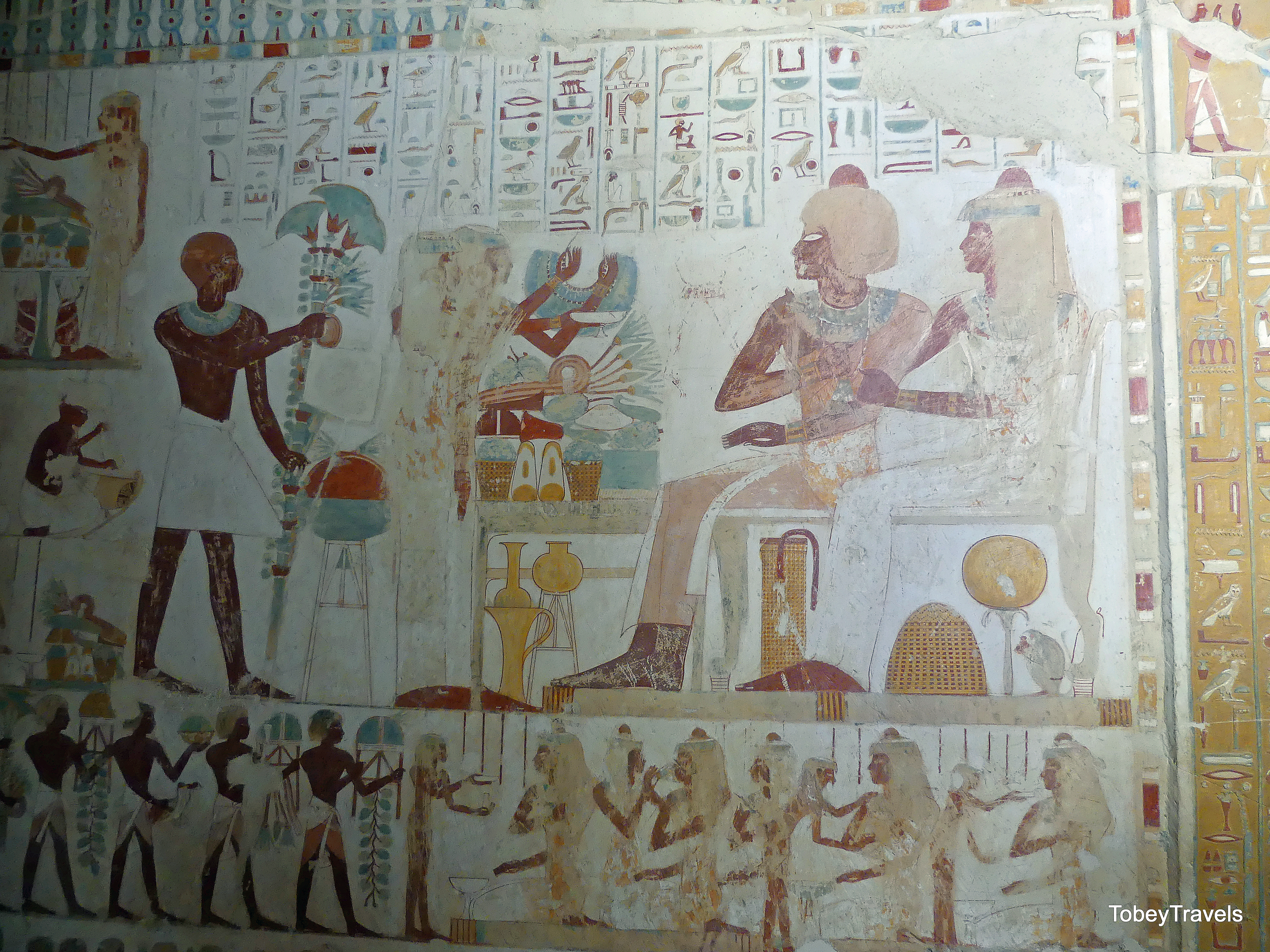
Userhat and Mutnefret receive offerings from their son and daughters.

Although not completed, TT56 is, architecturally, one of those inverted "T" tombs typical of the New Kingdom, with a front courtyard that serves as a hallway to reach other tombs (TT123, TT294, TT293, TT292, TT291); it is one of the tombs whose wall paintings are best preserved among those of the necropolis of Sheikh Abd el-Qurna.

A short access corridor (1 on the plan) in which the deceased and his wife are depicted adoring Osiris, is followed by a transversal room; on the walls: (2) the deceased followed by his wife and mother with bunches of flowers; (3) on five superimposed registers, the inspection of the livestock, the slaughter of some bulls, the harvest and the transport of wheat while some women proceed to collect the flax in the presence of the deceased.

A little further on, on the short side (4), in a double scene, the deceased offers bunches of flowers to Iamunedjeh (TT84), the king's first herald and of whom he was the deputy, and to his wife, on the left, and to another couple (whose names are not specified), on the right.

Below, on the same wall, a stele with priests purifying the statue of the deceased and a reading priest [N 14] who performs the Opening of the mouth ceremony on the deceased.

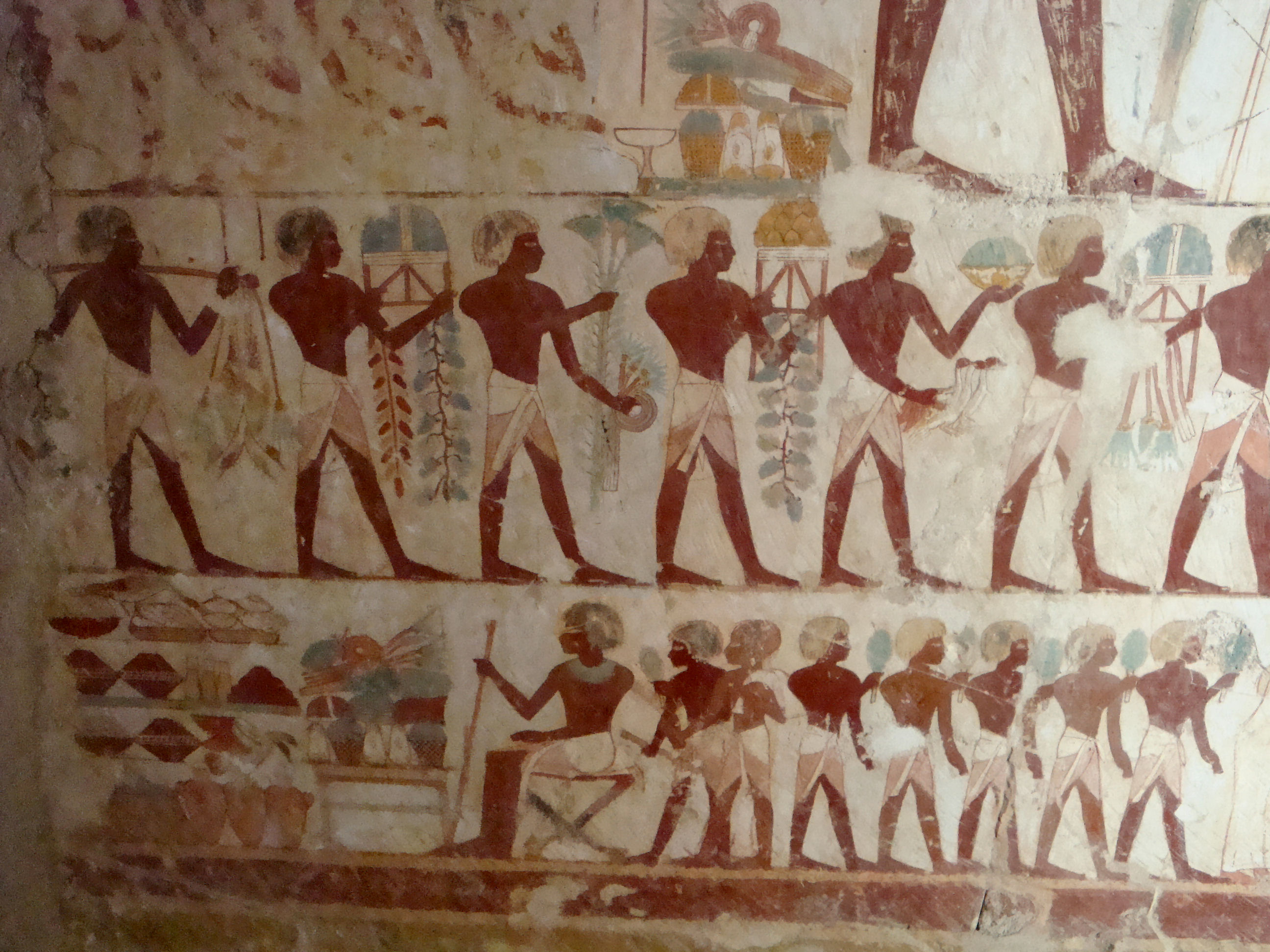
Tomb TT56 of Userhat (Kairoinfo4u)

A little further on, two daughters offer necklaces and cups and a son offers bunches of flowers to the deceased and his wife; on four superimposed registers, banquet scenes with musicians (female lutenists, castanets players and a male harpist) and monkeys hidden under the chairs of the participants.

Beyond the corridor that gives access to a more internal room, on four registers, the inspection of recruits and men, including a barber, sitting under the trees; a little further on, on four registers, rows of seated men and others carrying supplies to the warehouses.

The deceased offers bunches of flowers and fruit to Amenhotep II under a kiosk while some soldiers bow to the two figures; on the short side, a stele with the deceased before Osiris and dedicatory texts; subsequently, on three registers, offertory scenes with three men carrying bunches of flowers and a man making an offertory to a woman who is caring for a child; offering bearers whose procession continues in the next scene in which the deceased and his wife offer incense on a brazier.

A short corridor, in which the deceased appears in the presence of Osiris and Anubis, allows access to a room in which (13–14–15) escort soldiers are represented while the deceased is hunting, in the desert, on board a chariot, various animals including some hyenas. Scenes of fowling and fishing practiced by the deceased and his wife Mutnofret as well as offerings to the deceased of animals and products from the marshy lands of the Nile Delta. A funerary procession develops along a wall (16–17–18), with a priest who performs the ceremony of the opening of the mouth; the room has at the back (19) a niche that houses the statues of the deceased and his wife.

== See also ==
- List of Theban tombs
- N. de Garis Davies – Nina and Norman de Garis Davies, Egyptologists
