= Khuwyt =

Ancient Egyptian musician

Khuwyt (fl. c. 1960 BC) was an ancient Egyptian musician who is represented in a decorative painting in the Tomb of Senet. Senet was a relative (either mother or wife) of Intefiqer, an Egyptian political official during the 12th Dynasty. She and a male musician, identified as the singer Didumin, are depicted side by side, playing harps to entertain Intefiqer. She is identified on the north wall of the tomb as "chantress, Khuwyt, daughter of Maket." Their songs are about Hathor, the golden goddess, and about the vizier himself, wishing him life and health.
