= Khaemhat =

xa a m HAt t Z1 A52
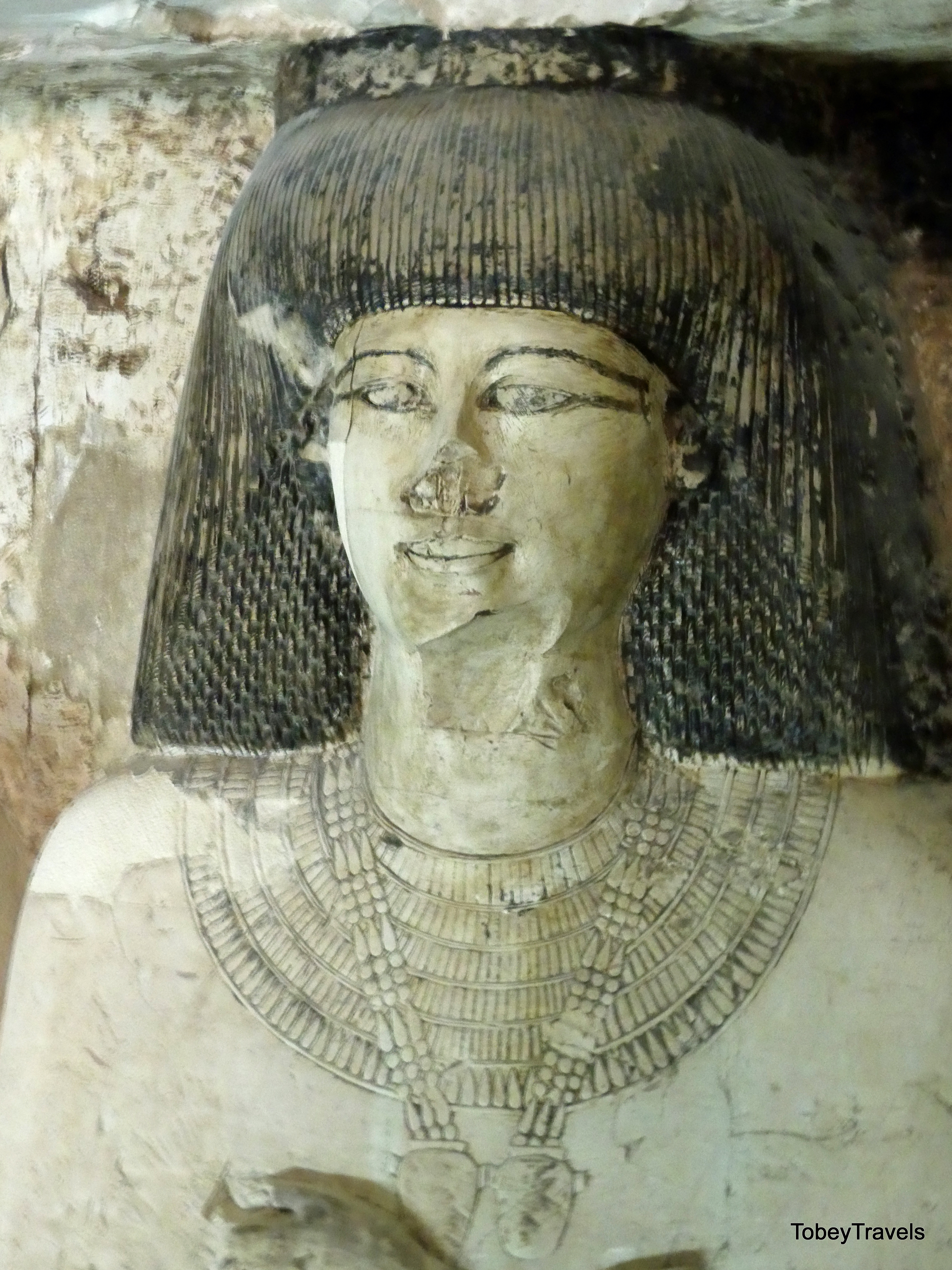
- Statue of Khaemhat in his tomb
- Years active: c. 1355 BC
- Parent: Iemhotep

Khaemhat, also called Mahu (fl. c. 1355 BC) was an ancient Egyptian high official in charge under king Amenhotep III. Khaemhat was the royal scribe and overseer of the double granary of Upper and Lower Egypt and was therefore responsible for the grain and food supply to the royal palace. Khaemhat is mainly known from his Theban tomb chapel (TT57) that is decorated with reliefs and shows him twice in front of king Amenhotep III. Khaemhat is also mentioned on jar labels found at Malkata, the palace of the king. The inscriptions date to year 30 and year 39 of the king's reign, providing evidence that he was in charge in the later years of the king's 39-year-long reign. Khaemhat was the son of an official called Iemhotep.
