= TT54 =

Theban tomb

Coordinates: 25.7333°N 32.6000°E

Theban tomb TT54
- Burial site of Hui, usurped by Kenro and his son, Khonsu
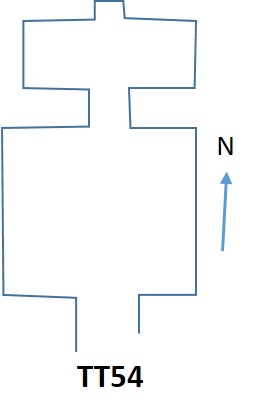

- Location within Egypt
- Location: Sheikh Abd el-Qurna, Theban Necropolis
- Discovered: Open in antiquity
- ← Previous; TT53 Next → TT55

The Theban Tomb TT54 is located in Sheikh Abd el-Qurna, part of the Theban Necropolis, on the west bank of the Nile, opposite to Luxor. It was originally the burial place of the ancient Egyptian official Hui, who was an official during the reign of Thutmose IV and Amenhotep III. However, it was seized later in the 19th Dynasty by another official, Kenro, and his son Khonsu.

== See also ==
- List of Theban tombs
