= TT57 =

Theban tomb

Theban tomb TT57
- Burial site of Khaemhat called Mahu
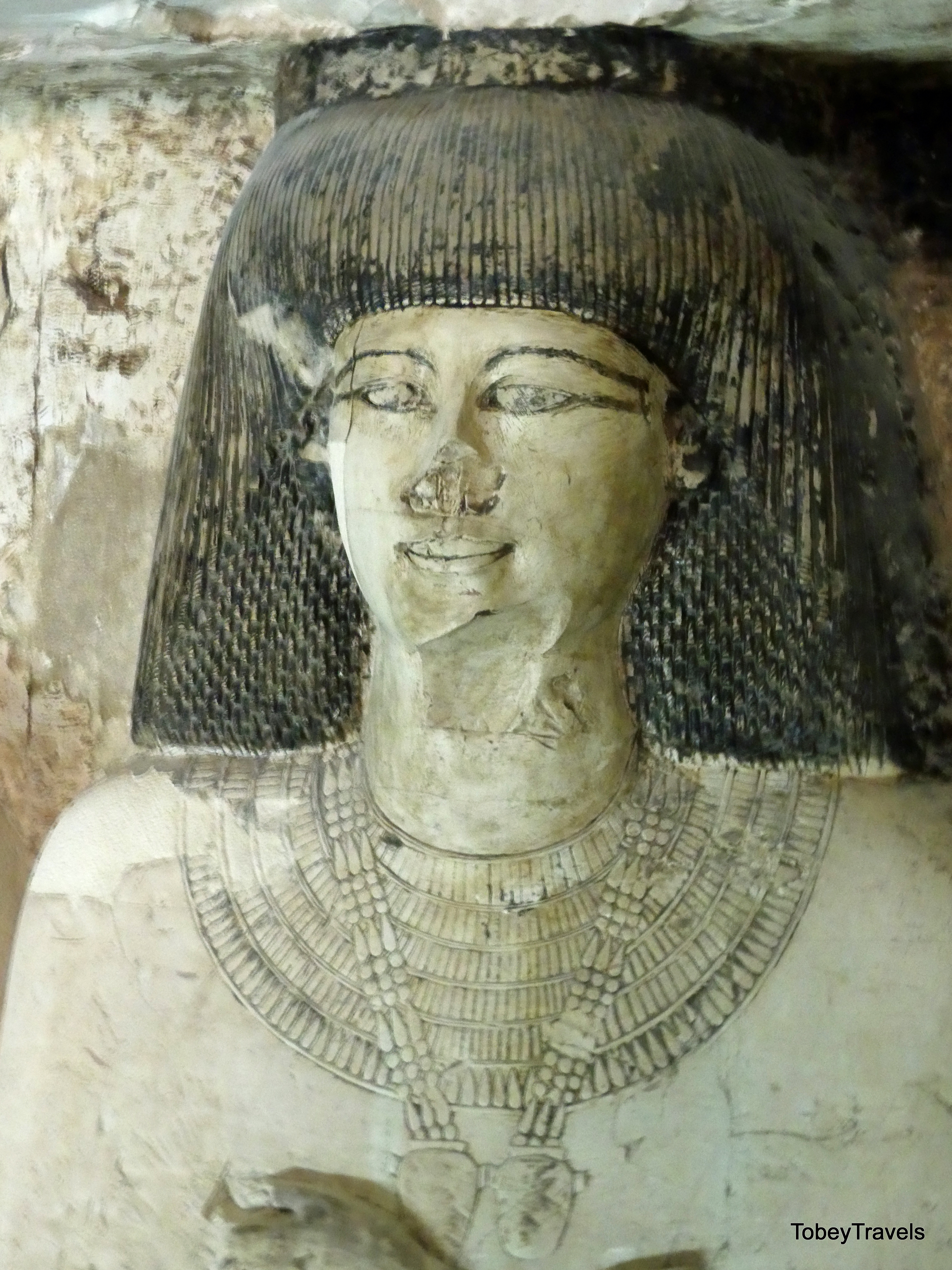
- Statue of Khaemhat from Tomb TT57

- Location within Egypt
- Coordinates: 25°44′N 32°37′E
- Location: Sheikh Abd el-Qurna, Theban Necropolis
- Discovered: Open in antiquity
- ← Previous; TT56 Next → TT58

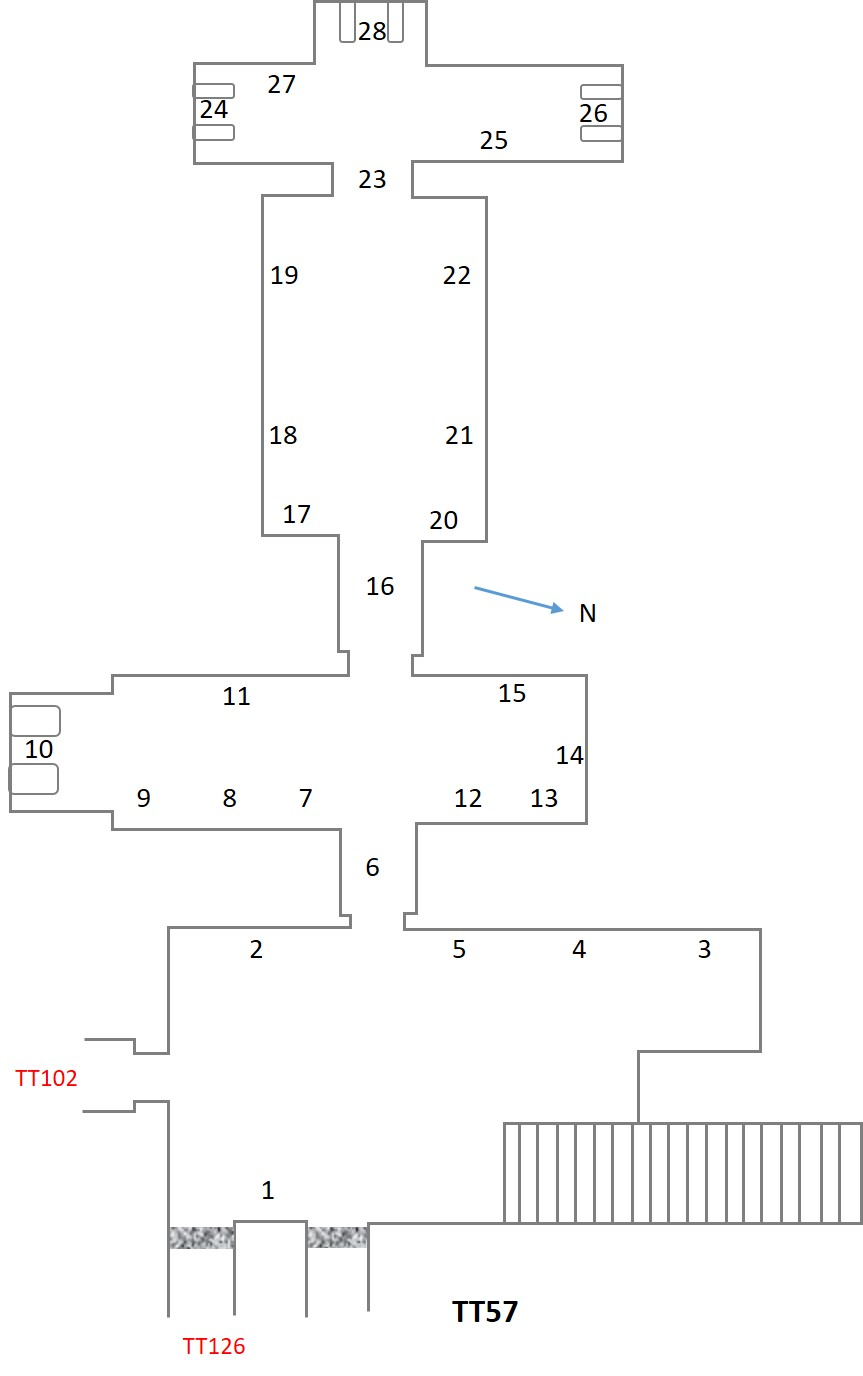
Plan of the tomb

N28 a m F4 t Z1 called M a F18 Y1
Khaemhat called Mahu
in hieroglyphs
Era: New Kingdom
(1550–1069 BC)

The Theban Tomb TT57 is located in Sheikh Abd el-Qurna. It forms part of the Theban Necropolis, situated on the west bank of the Nile opposite Luxor. The tomb is the burial place of the ancient Egyptian official Khaemhat, who was royal scribe and overseer of double granary, during the reign Amenhotep III. The relief decoration of the tomb is regarded as the best of New Kingdom art.

It seems that the tomb of Khaemhat was always exposed and known. Many early travelers visited the tomb and made drawings of the scenes. These include Nestor L'Hôte and the expedition guided by Karl Richard Lepsius. They also copied and published several scenes. Other travelers made squeezes of the reliefs.

The tomb lies directly next to TT102 and TT126. Tomb TT102 belongs to the royal scribe Imhotep who dates to the reign of Amenhotep III too. Imhotep appears also in tomb TT57 and he is indeed Khaemhat's father. TT102 was perhaps built at the same time as TT57. Tomb TT126 is much later and belongs to a certain Hormose, who might date to the Saite-Period. All three tombs share a courtyard as entrance area. On the West side of this courtyard is the entrance to the cult chapel of Khaemhat, that is cut into the rocks. The facade of the chapel is decorated with stelae and scenes. One stela belongs to a certain Suemmerenhor and is most likely later in date. Relief decorated tombs became common in the later years of Amenhotep's III reign.

== Facade ==
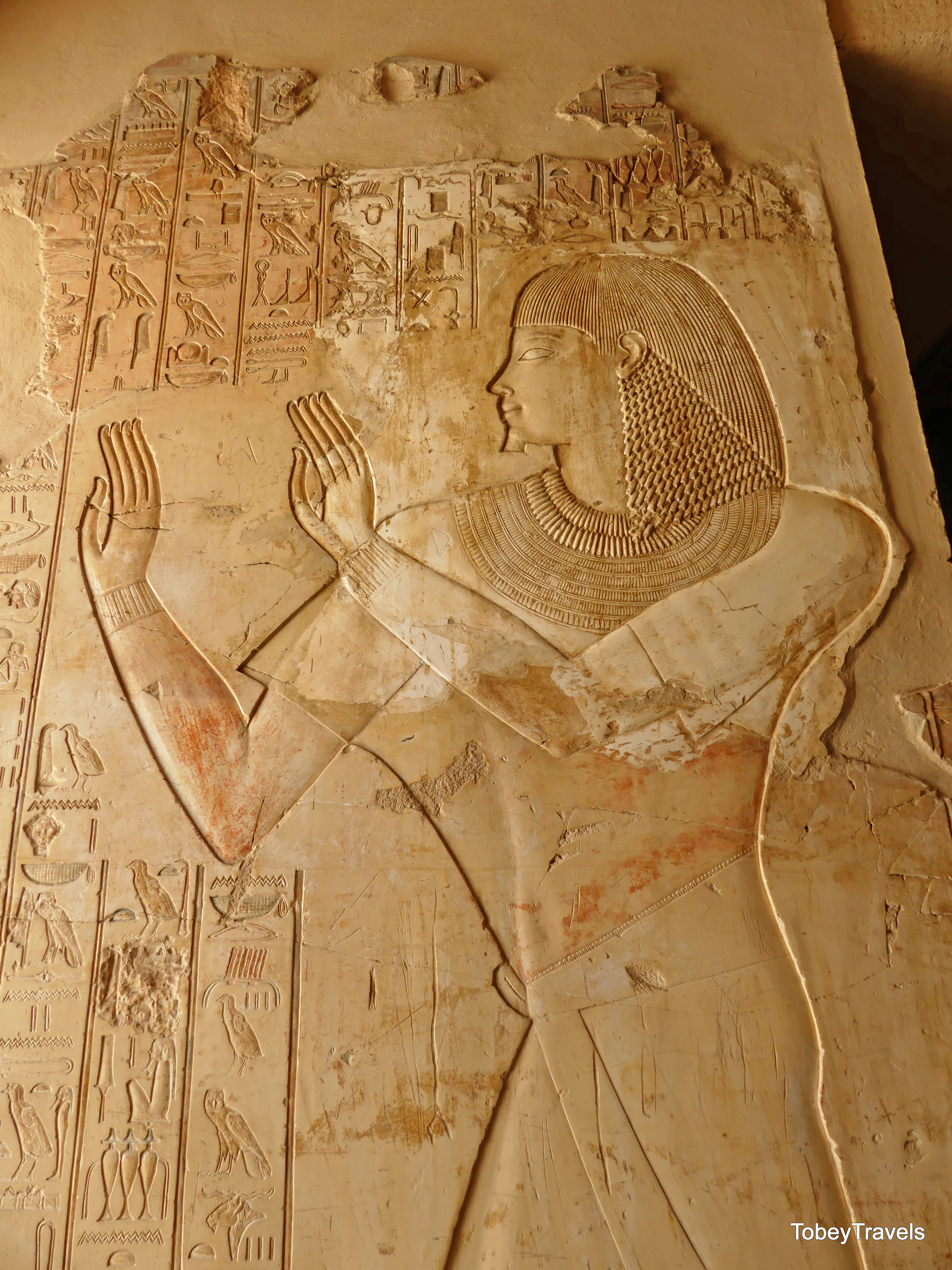
Khaemhat sings to Ra at the Entrance to TT57

The facade shows on both sides next to the entrance Khaemhat standing with the back to the entrance. Only the lower part of the figure is preserved. There are long text columns next to the figure. To the right there is a purification scene, showing three figures. Their upper part is lost and also inscriptions that could inform about the identity of these figures. Further on the right there is a well preserved stela. It shows Khaemhat in front of a shrine poring water over it. In the shrine are standing the four sons of Horis. all human headed. There are also depicted Isis, Nephthys, Selket and Neith. Under these figures are shown four canopic jars.

== Broad Hall ==
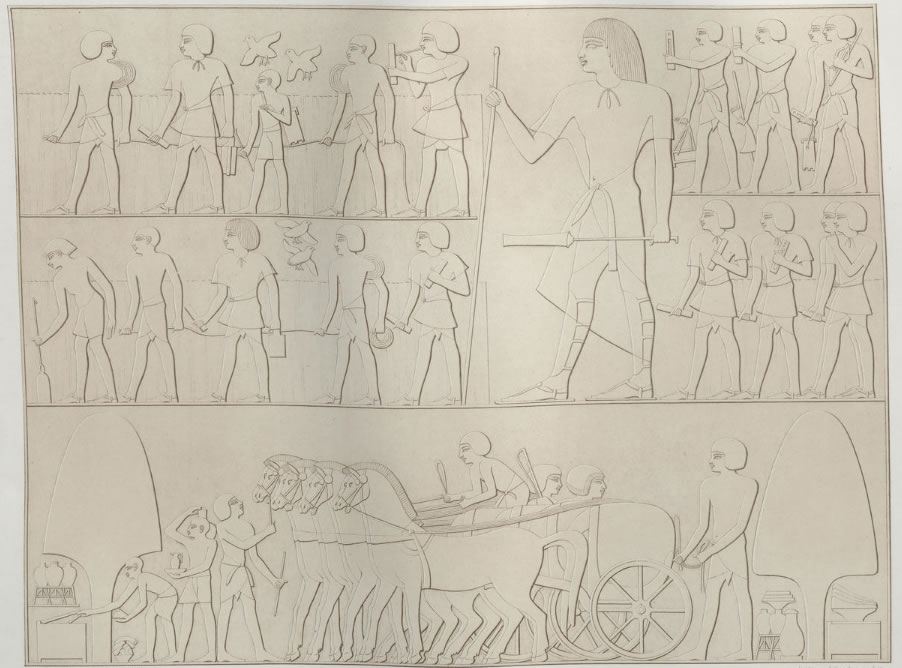
Khaemhat overseeing agricultural activities

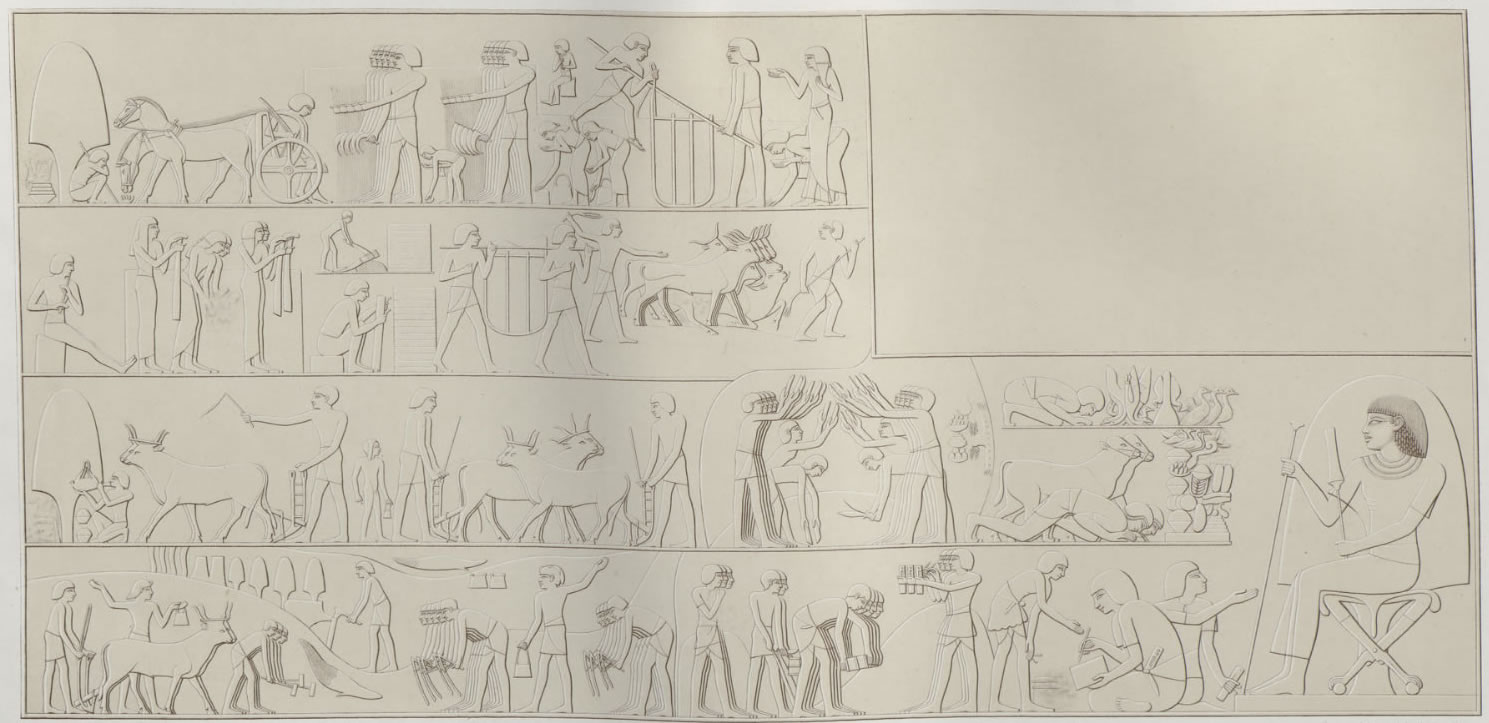
Khaemhat overseeing agricultural activities

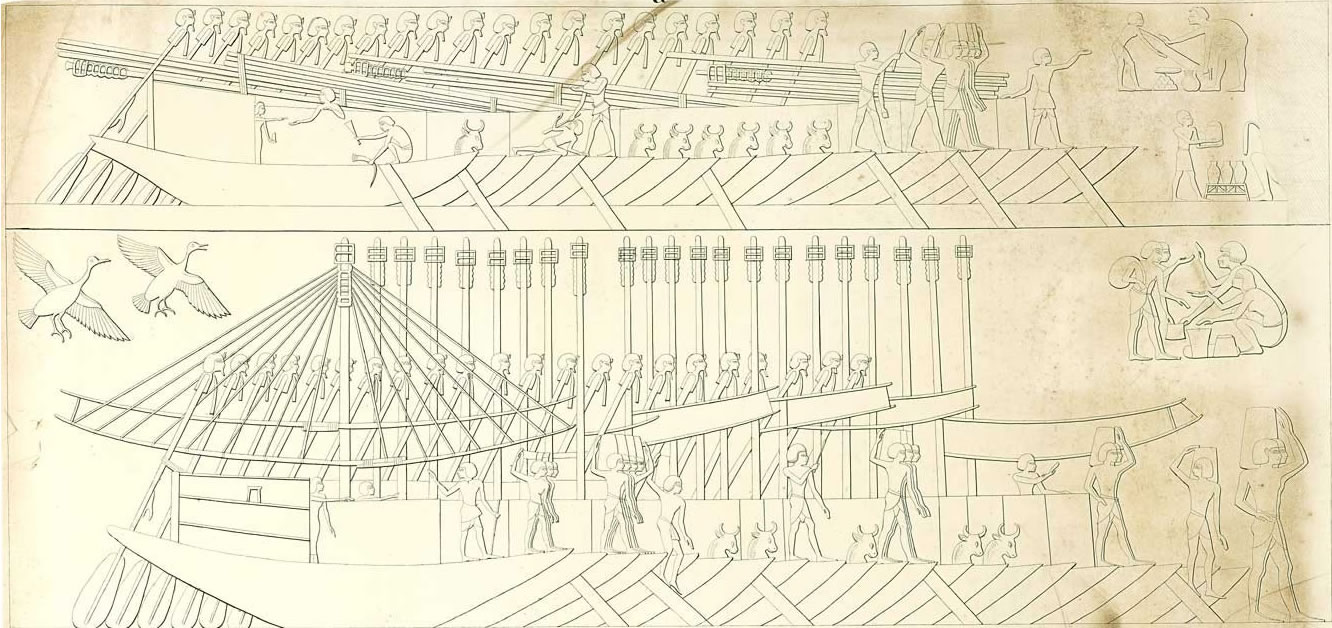
Ships and market scene (on the very right)

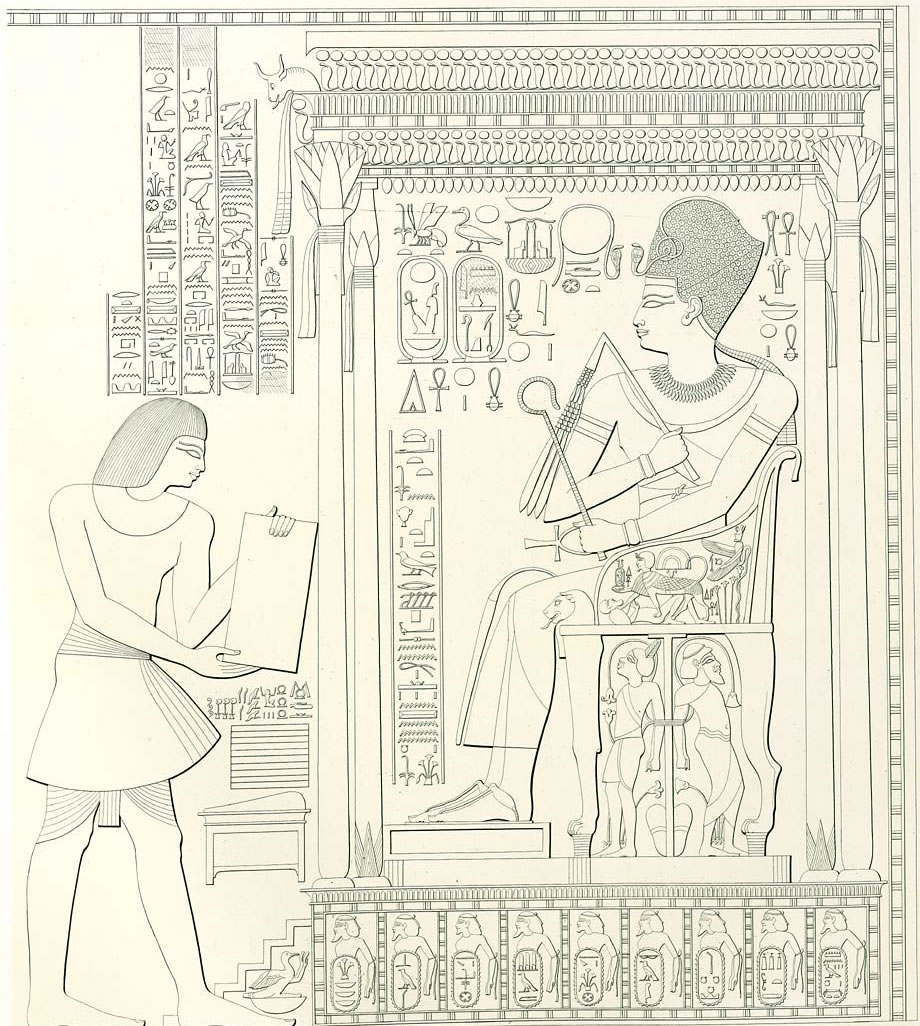
Khaemhat before the king, scene on the southern side of the west wall of the first hall

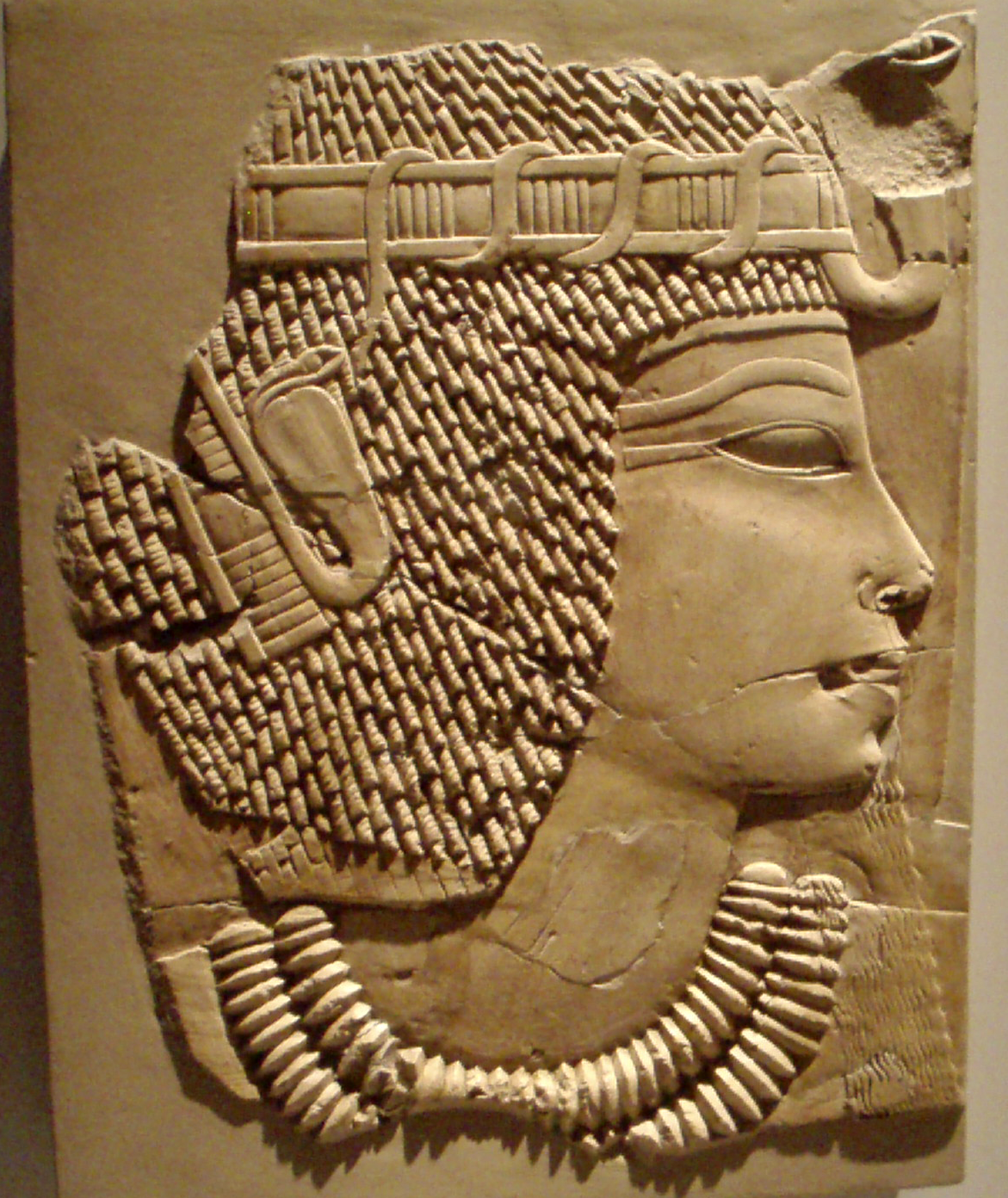
King Amenhotep III, head cut out of wall and now in Berlin

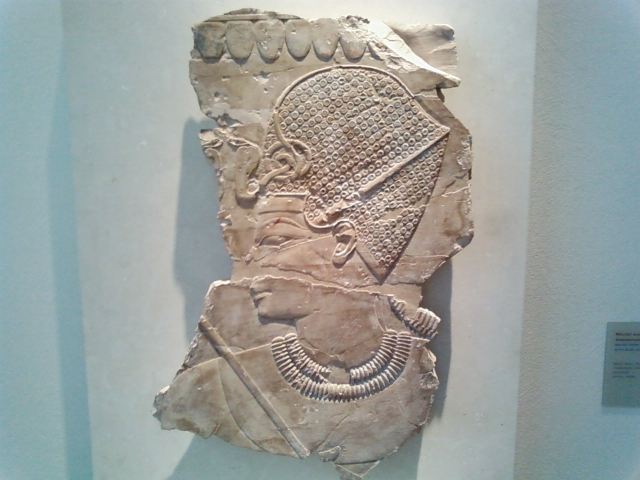
King Amenhotep III, head cut out of wall and now in Berlin

From the courtyard, there is an entrance to a broad hall that is fully decorated with reliefs. The passage to the hall is on the south side inscribed with a hymn to the sun-god Ra. The depictions in relief in the broad hall are mainly about the life of Khaemhat as overseer of the double granary. Unlike some other tombs of the same period, scenes, such as fishing and fowling do not take much space. Instead, one part of the tomb is mainly dedicated to the relation of the tomb owner to the king.

=== East wall ===
On the East wall, several agricultural scenes are preserved. They relate to the office of Khaemehat as overseer of the granaries. The scenes are often rather conventional as found in other tombs. They include scenes from ploughing to harvesting. But there are many unusual details, such as a boy taking a break and playing the flute. Farm workers are shown wearing sandals. One man is depicted helping to close a big grain basket. A similar details is found in the tomb of Nebamun, something in other tombs not depicted.

On the South side of the entrance Khaemhat is making offerings to the god Amun-Re-Harakhte. There are also shown two rows of freight ships and there is a market scene. Market scenes are not common in New Kingdom tombs. This scene is exceptional as it depicts Nubians as sellers of goods. Three small groups of traders are shown in three registers on the right of the ships. The middle groups is largely destroyed. It seems that the big ships on the left belong to the royal palace and that they were on a mission to Nubia, where they stopped and where single sailors went on land for buying food from local Nubians.

The wall north of the entrance shows again Khaemhat making an offering, in this case to Renenutet, the goddess for the harvest. On the left of this scenes, agricultural activities are depicted. Here, the figure of Khaemhat is occupying two registers. he is holding a staff. In front of him and behind him are shown lower officials in two registers. They are holding measuring cords and scribal equipment. The lowest register shows a chariot. The next scene occupies four register. Here, ploughing and a harvest is shown. Khaemhat is sitting next to a tree and occupies two registers. At the very top on the left is depicted a chariot.

=== West wall ===
On the West wall, Khaemhat is shown twice in front of the king. On the Northern part of the wall, the king is sitting on the left in a kiosk at his Sed festival, as the captions says. The sed festival is the celebration of kingship performed after a 30 years reign and then again every three years. The king wears a short wig with a diadem and an Uraeus. In his hands he is holding a flail and a heqa scepter. His throne is decorated and shows the king as a griffin trampling on enemies. Two enemies are also depicted under the seat between the legs of the throne. At the base of the kiosk is depicted a row on nine enemies. Nine is the symbolic number of enemies that Egypt had. The text line before the king says: appearing of the king on the great throne to reward these leaders of Upper and Lower Egypt. In front of the king's kiosk is shown Khaemhat as largest official while there are behind him two rows of officials bowing down to the king. They are shown in a smaller scale. In the most upper, third register two officials receiving awards.The face of the king in this scene was cut out and brought to the Egyptian Museum in Berlin. It is now replaced by a cast.

On the Southern part of the West wall, Khaemhat is again depicted in front of the king. The latter is sitting within a kiosk on the right side, looking to the left. The kiosk is richly adorned. At the top there are two rows of Uraei. On top of the roof is shown the upper part of a bull. Four lotus and papyrus shaped columns are supporting this roof. The king wears the blue crown and is holding a flail and heqa-scepter. In his left hand he is also holding the ankh (life) sign. The side of the throne shows again the king as a griffin, trampling on a foreigner. Under the seat of the throne appear two foreigners, bound together at the back. The base of the kiosk is decorated with a row of nine foreigners. The text in the kiosk names the king as Amenhotep III and also calls him Lord of the sed-festival. On the left side is standing Khaemhat presenting to the king a document. The caption before the king reads: Appearing of the king on the great throne, receiving the document of the summer of Upper and Lower Egypt. Today this scene is badly destroyed; the upper half is totally gone.

=== North and South wall ===
The scenes on the North, short end of the hall are badly destroyed. Three registers are still visible and they include offerings to the deceased. At the Southern end of the hall, two statues are sculptured into a niche that is carved into the rock. They show Khaemhat and his father Imhotep. The walls of the niche are also decorated and is inscribed with a long offering list.

The ceiling of the hall is plain and painted with a pattern and with inscriptions.

== Long Hall ==
The passage from the broad to the long hall features a depiction of Khaemhat standing before Osiris and Isis and before Osiris and Nephthys. In the middle of the western wall there is the entrance leading to the long hall. The long hall proper is mainly dedicated to the Underworld and to funerary rites. The South wall is divided into three registers and shows a funerary procession, boats as well as Osiris and the Western goddess. The Northern wall shows the deceased in the fields of Iaru (the Underworld), the pilgrimage to Abydos is shown.

== Inner Hall ==
The passage to the inner hall is decorated with the spells 110, 112 and 113 from the Book of the Dead. The spells are complete, unlike other tombs of about the same reign where they are presented in a short version. The room itself has at the North, West and South side niches for statues of Khaemhat and his family members. The statue in the northern niche shows Khaemhat and his wife, those in the western one shows Khaemhat and his father Imhotep. Those in the Southern niche shows the tomb owner and a woman.

== Bibliography ==
- Aldred, Cyril (1961). New Kingdom Art in Ancient Egypt. London. pp. 499–500
- Achille Constant Théodore Émile Prisse D'Avennes: Histoire de l'art égyptien: d'après les monuments; depuis les temps les plus reculés jusqu'à la domination romaine (copies of scenes are found on four unnumbered plates), Bertrand: Paris 1878 (online)
- Helck, Wolfgang (1957). Zur Verwaltung des Mittleren und Neuen Reichs. pp. 499–500
- Lepsius, Karl Richard (1846–1856). Denkmäler aus Ägypten und Äthiopien, Abteilung I: Topographie & Architektur (in German). Berlin. OCLC 60700892. plates 76 and 77 (online), Textbandband III, 283
- Manniche, Lise (1987). City of the Dead, Thebes in Egypt. London. ISBN 0714112887.
- El-Tanbouli, Mohammed Abdel-Latif (2017). Tomb of Khâemhat [TT 57]. Cairo: Center of Documentation and Studies on Ancient Egypt. ISBN 978-977-6420-26-7.
