= Nakht =

Ancient Egypytian scribe

- Scribe and astronomer of Amun
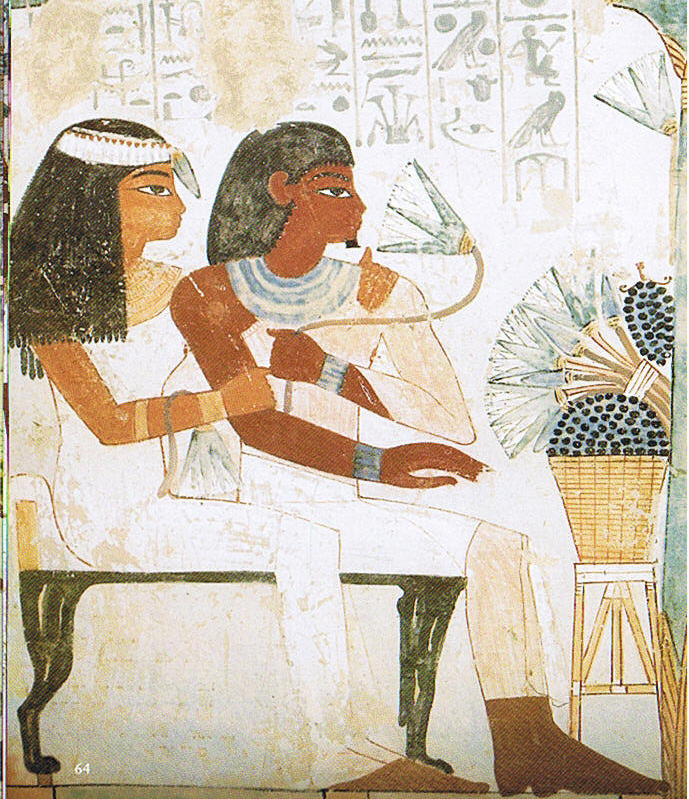
- Nakht smelling a lotus while being embraced by his wife, Tawy, while also sitting in front of a set of offerings. Tomb TT52, Thebes, Egypt
- Dynasty: Eighteenth of Egypt
- Pharaoh: Thutmose IV
- Wife: Tawy
- Burial: TT52

Nakht was an ancient Egyptian official who held the position of a scribe and astronomer of Amun, probably during the reign of Thutmose IV of the Eighteenth Dynasty. He was buried in the Theban Necropolis in tomb TT52.

== See also ==
- List of ancient Egyptian scribes
- List of Theban Tombs
