= Beautiful Festival of the Valley =

Ancient Egyptian holiday

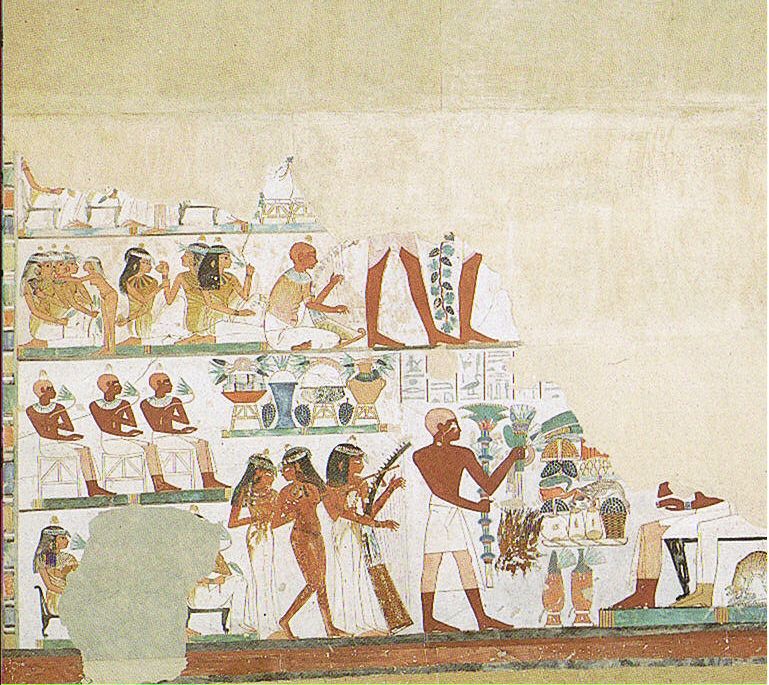
The Beautiful Festival of the Valley depicted in the Tomb of Nakht

The Beautiful Festival of the Valley (Egyptian: hb nfr n jnt; Arabic: عيد الوادي الجميل, romanized: Eid al-Wadi al-Jamil) was an ancient Egyptian festival, celebrated annually in Thebes (now Luxor), during the Middle Kingdom period and later.

The sacred barques of the wind deity Amun-Re, his consort Mut and son Khensu left the temple at Karnak in order to visit the funerary temples of deceased royalty on the West Bank and their shrines in the Theban Necropolis.

== Celebration ==
The Beautiful Festival of the Valley was a celebration of the dead, and could be more ancient than the Opet Festival as it can be traced back to the Middle Kingdom. It was said to be held as a remembrance of the dead, from the beginning of the Middle Kingdom. However, when joined with the Festival of Opet, the holy procession became the main event of the liturgical calendar of Thebes. The annual festival was held at the New Moon of Month Two of the harvesting season Shemu. This was the 10th month in a calendar of 12. During Hatshepsut's reign she carried out both the Opet and The Beautiful Festival of the Valley to Amun.

There was a grand procession at the start of the festival which could go for several days. It was a colourful and joyous occasion for the people of Thebes. The procession would be led by Amun, from the East (rising sun, new life, the direction of the living) to the West (setting sun, land of the dead.) A statue or picture of Amun, decorated with a broad collar and sun disk, would be led by priests down the Nile in a ceremonial boat or barque. This barque would then be placed in a ship known as the Userhet that was covered in gold and precious materials. This Userhet would be followed by boats for Mut and Khonsu to form the Theban Triad. The procession proceeded to the Temple of Million Years of the King where the townspeople would sacrifice food and drink as well as flowers to the flotilla of boats. Great quantities of flowers would be presented, as it is believed by the Egyptian culture that the flowers became filled with the essence of the deity. Townspeople then took these flowers to their relatives' tombs to pay their respects and ensure the revival of the deceased's spirit. They would drink and sleep on the deceased's tombs as different levels of consciousness blessed the dead and brought them closer to god. Amun's shrine was brought into the Djoser-djoseru to reaffirm the bond between the king of the gods and the king of the people.
