= TT53 =

Theban tomb

Coordinates: 25.7333°N 32.6000°E

Theban tomb TT53
- Burial site of Amenemhet
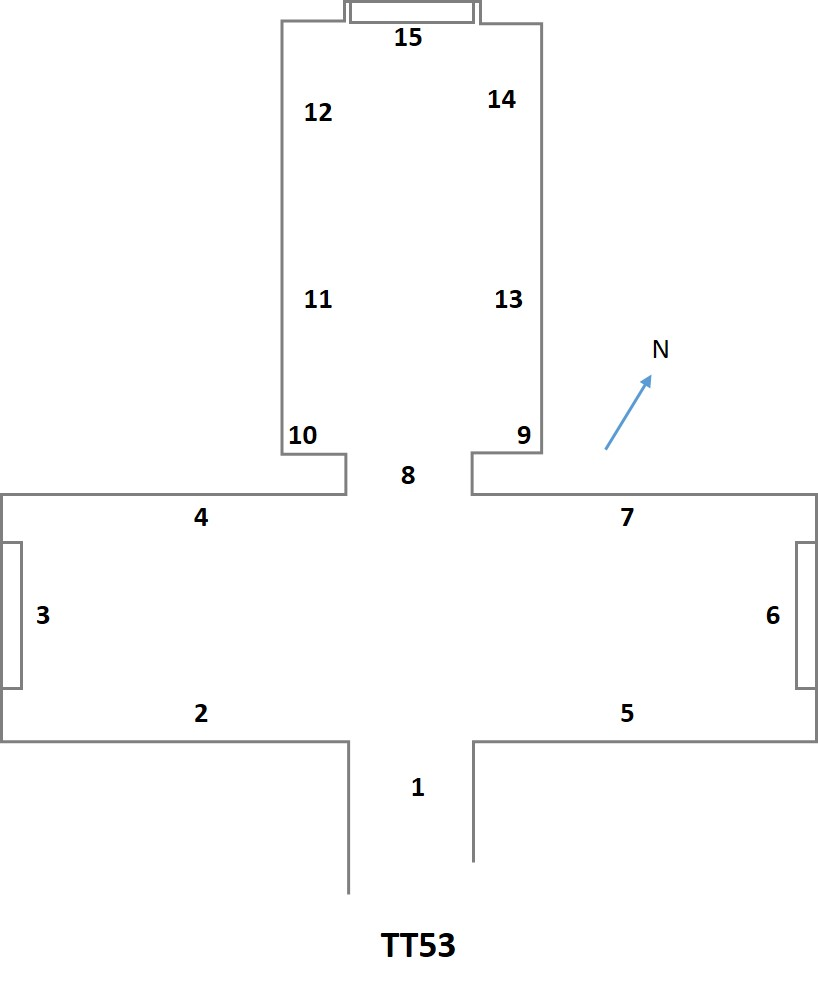

- Location within Egypt
- Location: Sheikh Abd el-Qurna, Theban Necropolis
- Discovered: Open in antiquity
- ← Previous; TT52 Next → TT54

The Theban Tomb TT53 is located in Sheikh Abd el-Qurna. It forms part of the Theban Necropolis, situated on the west bank of the Nile opposite Luxor. The tomb is the burial place of the ancient Egyptian official Amenemhet, who was an administrator in the Amun Temple during the reign of Thutmose III.

== See also ==
- List of Theban tombs
