= TT55 =

Tomb in the necropolis of Thebes

Theban tomb TT55
- Burial site of Ramose
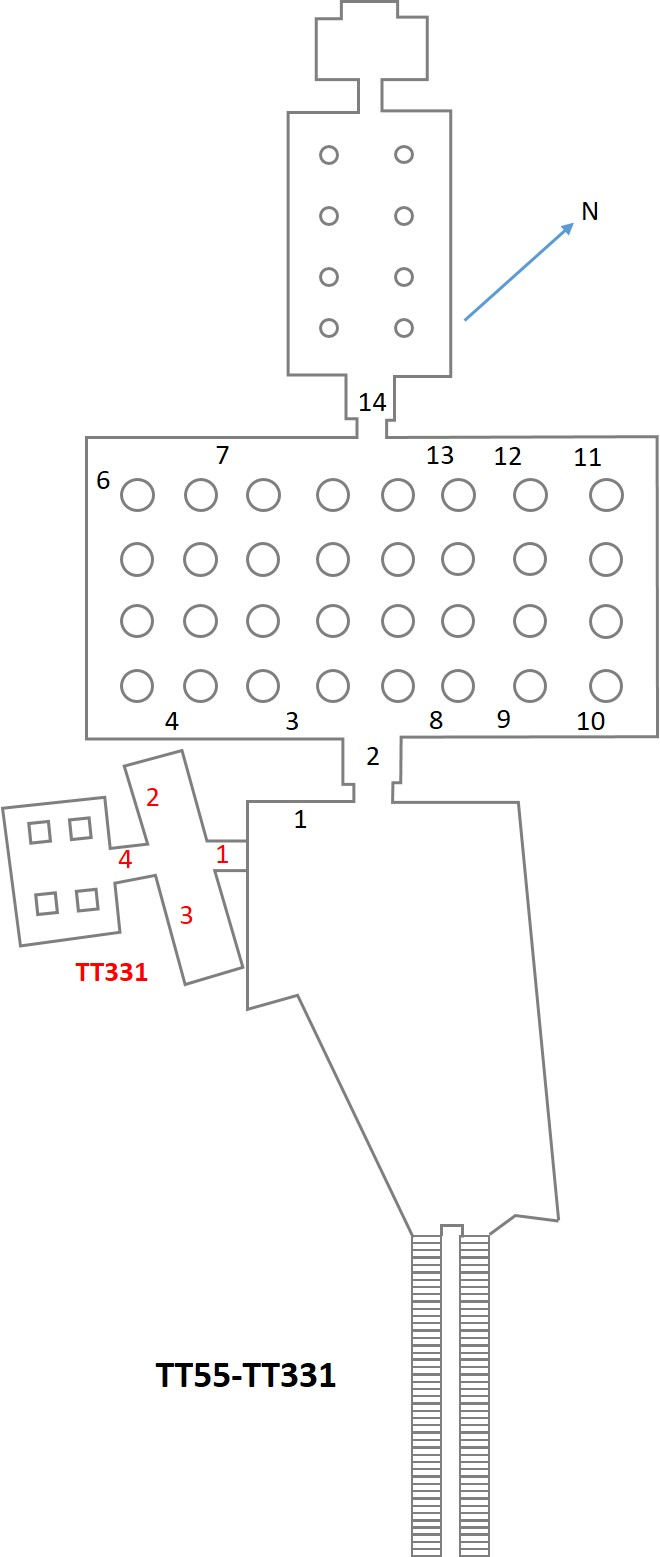
- Floor plan of TT55
- Location: Sheikh Abd el-Qurna, Theban Necropolis
- ← Previous; TT54 Next → TT56

N5 Z1 ms
Ramose
in hieroglyphs
Era: New Kingdom
(1550–1069 BC)

Tomb TT55 is located in Sheikh Abd el-Qurna, part of the Theban Necropolis, on the west bank of the Nile, opposite to Luxor. It is the burial place of the ancient Egyptian Vizier Ramose. It has a main room originally containing thirty-two columns and a corridor with eight columns. This tomb is notable for the high quality decorations in both the traditional and Amarna styles.

The tomb, which was featured in the first episode of the 2005 BBC documentary series How Art Made the World, has been open to the public, from 7.00am to 5.00pm, since 2007, as part of a 3 tomb group with TT56 Userhet and TT57 Khaemhet. Non-flash photography is permitted, with a fee of LE 300 for cameras and at no fee for mobile phones, again, on the 3 tomb group basis.

== Tomb decoration ==
The main body of the tomb is entered from the east facing open court, into a large columned hall, with four rows of eight columns. On the east wall, there are 'traditional' unpainted reliefs, showing Ramose, Ramose's wife and others (including his brother Amenhotep and his wife May). A panther skin clothed priest gives libations for Ramose and his family, and three girls play musical instruments. The south wall has funerary scenes again, this time painted, in two registers. These show the beginning of the evolution of the Amarna art style. The upper registers seem to show the actual procession, with the coffin on a boat being dragged along with a sledge. These scenes were later plastered over for some unknown reason.

The west wall has two scenes showing Akhenaten (labelled as Amenhotep IV, showing how early this tomb is in his reign) himself; the left side shows the king seated under a canopy with Ma'at seated beside him. Below the throne are carved the names of vassal nations (illustrated are Nubians, Asiatics and Libyans). Ramose stands in front of the king, showing his titles. The right side shows Akhenaten and Nefertiti, seated on a balcony rewarding Ramose with gold (this scene becomes nearly a standard in the Tombs of the Nobles in Amarna). Both of these scenes are unfinished and some of the details are sketched in and uncarved. In the far right of the west wall, Ramose is depicted leaving the palace and being congratulated by the people.

Further into the tomb, an undecorated corridor leads from the centre of the west wall to a chapel with three niches.

=== Burial chamber ===
The actual burial chamber is entered via a steeply sloping corridor in the south-west corner, and eventually leads to a four-pillared room, which is undecorated and seemingly unused, and contains an urn and an embalmed skull. There are traces of blue paint above the portal opposing the entrance.

== Gallery ==
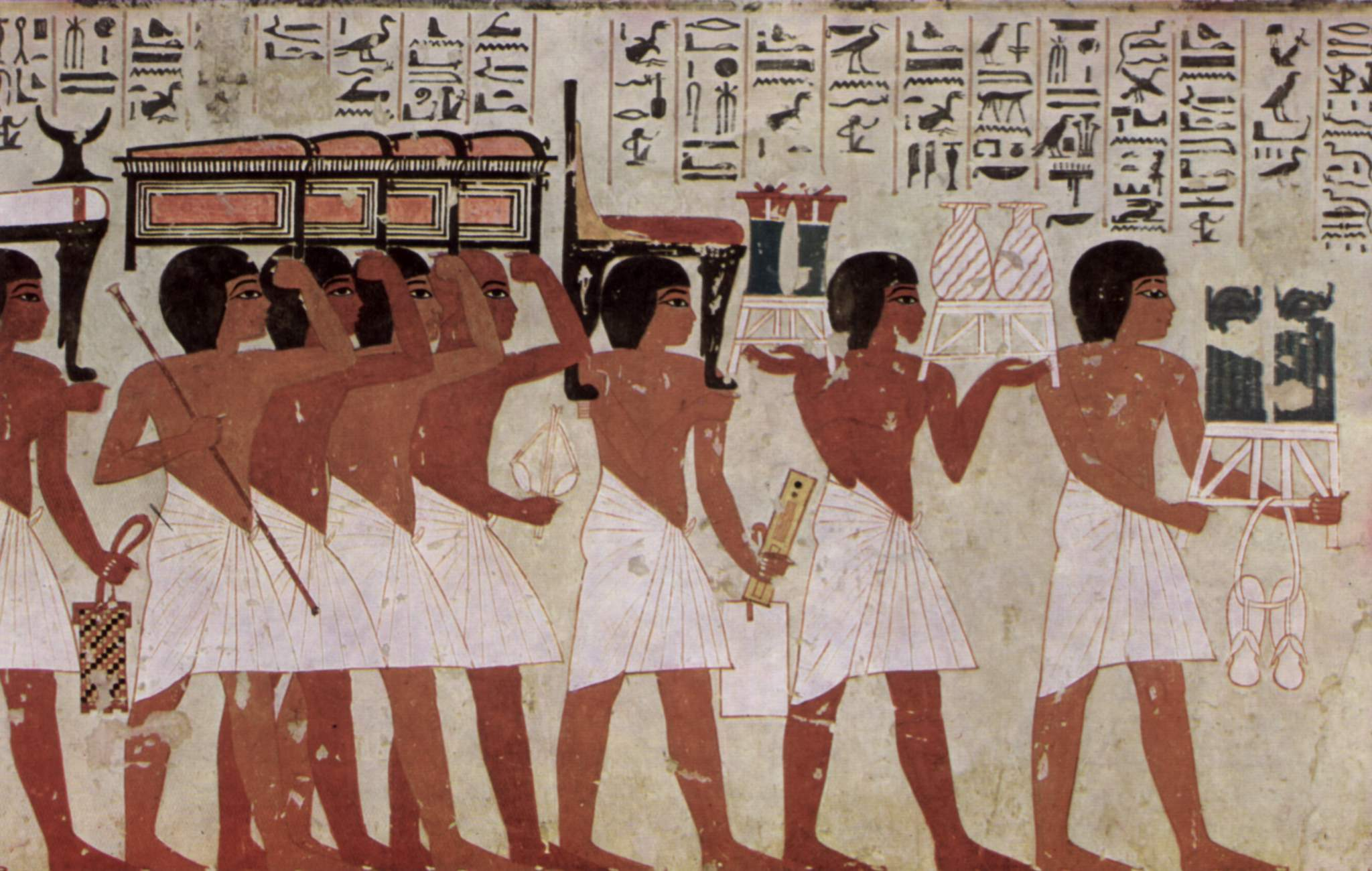
The funeral procession

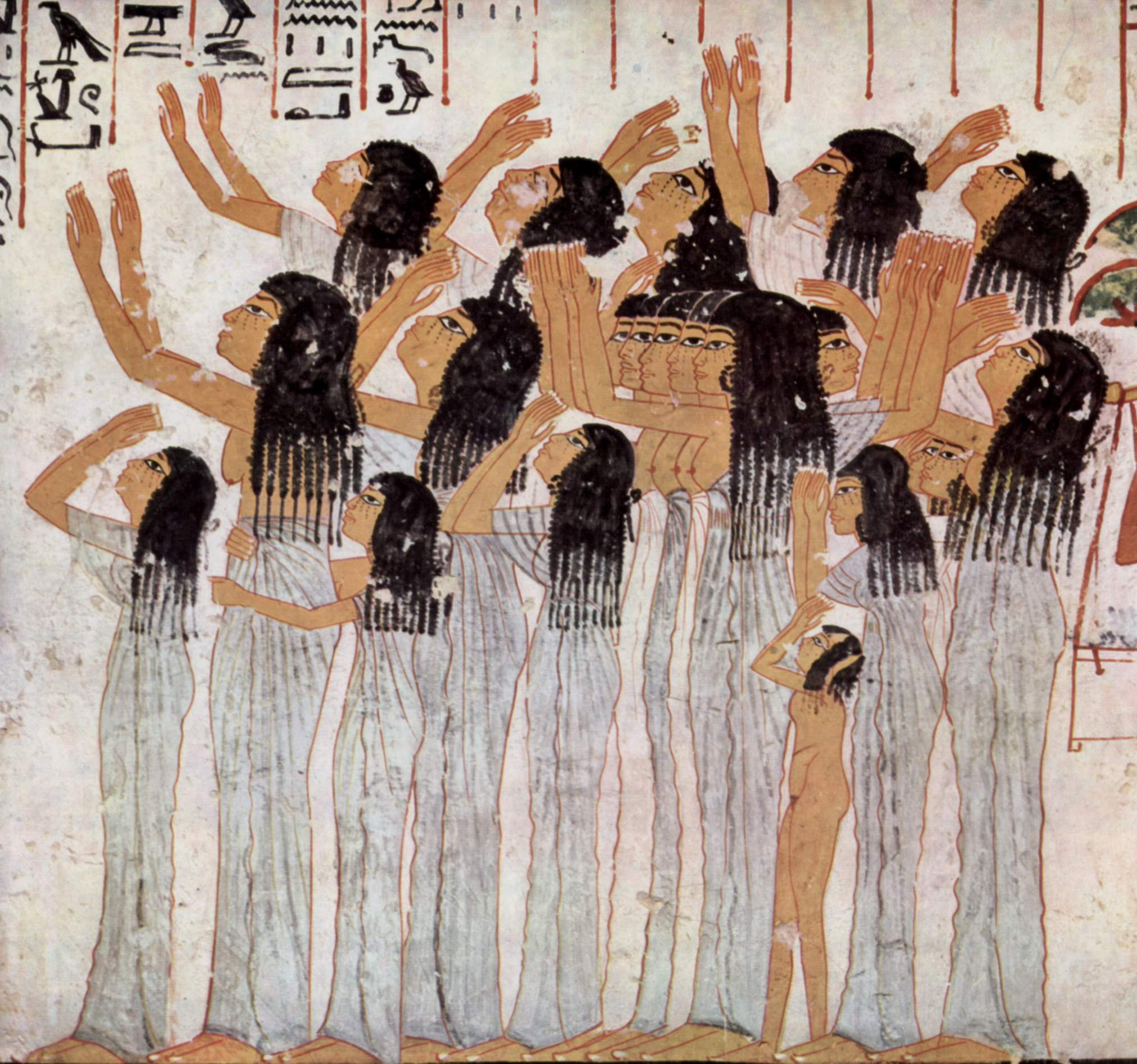
Lamenting Women, from the tomb (TT55) of Ramose, c. 1411–1375 BCE

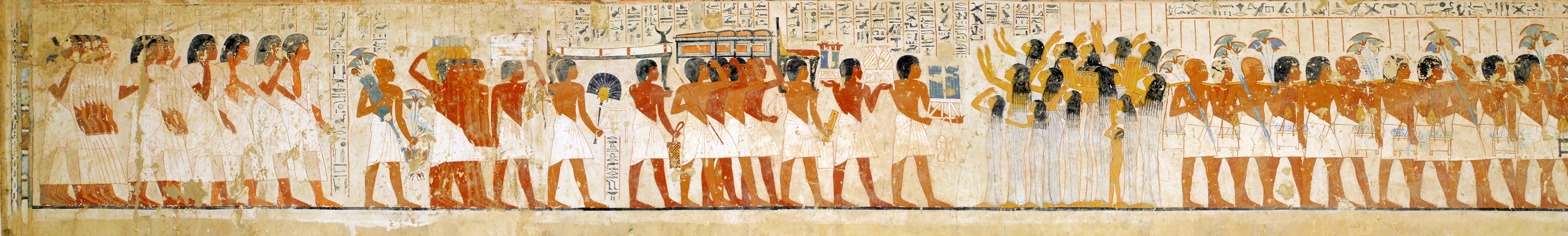
The funeral procession

Damaged relief of Akhenaten and Nefertiti.

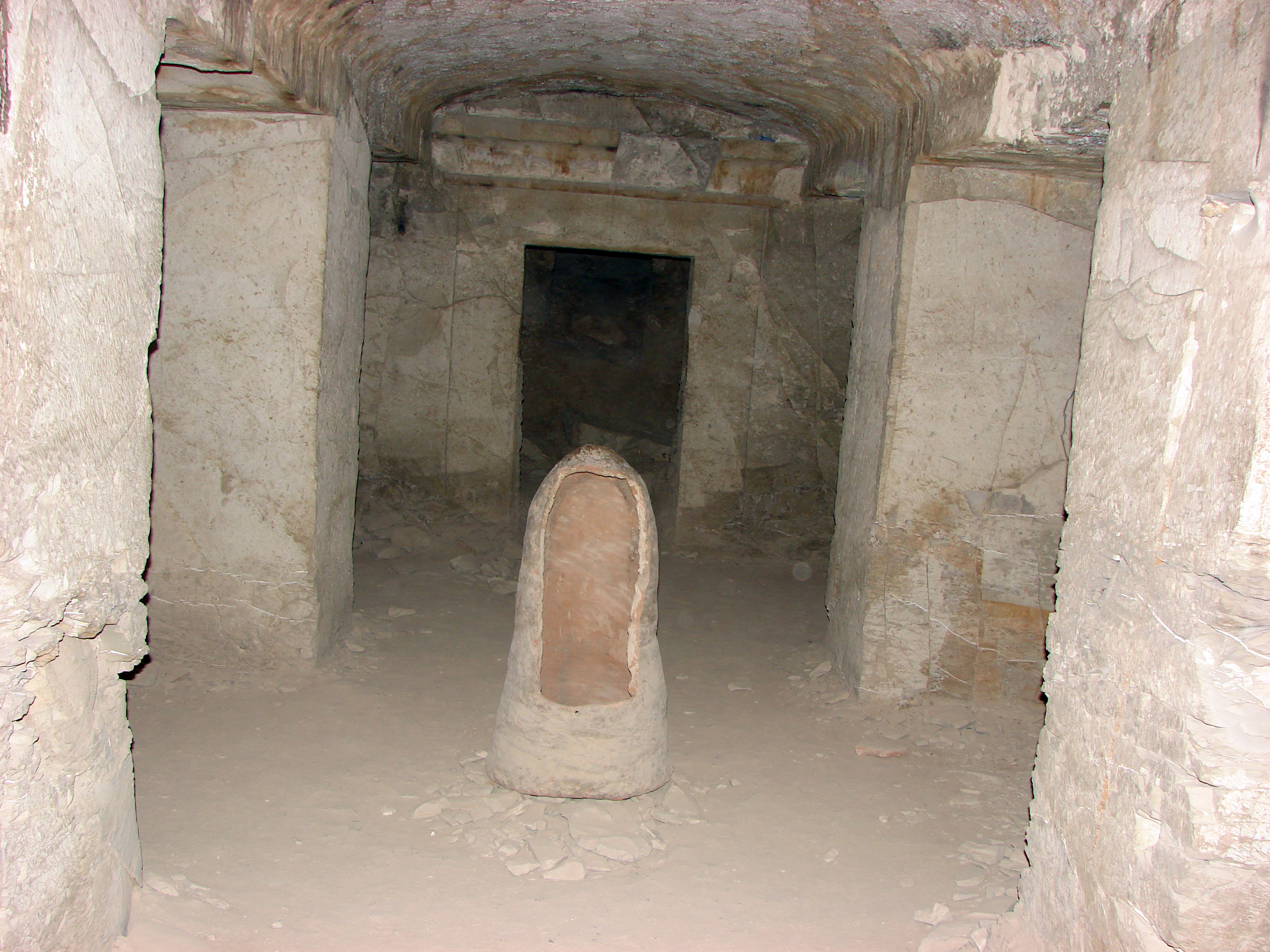
View of burial chamber, showing trace paint on opposing lintel, and urn.

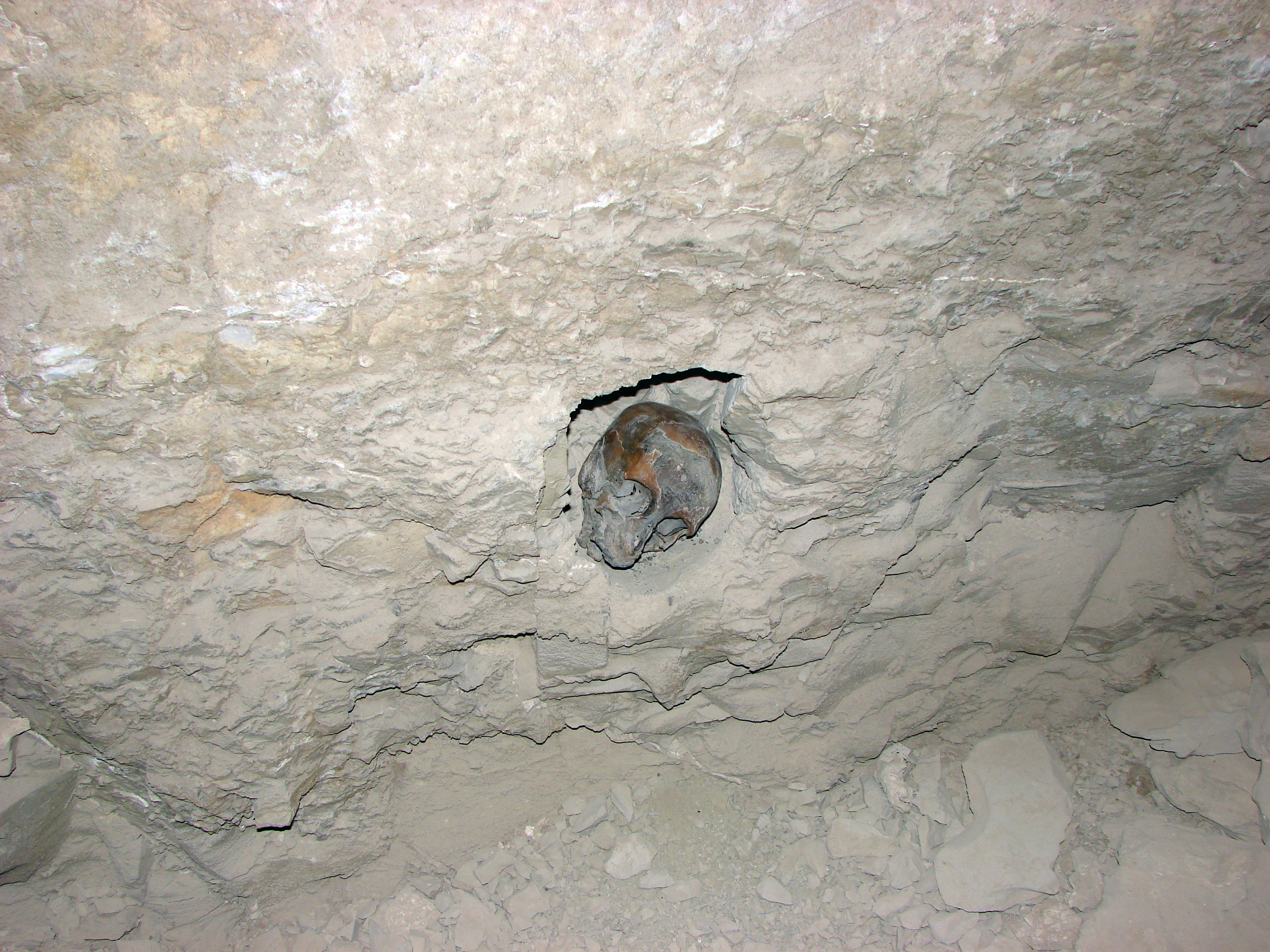
Mummified skull in niche of burial chamber.

== See also ==
- List of Theban tombs
