= TT59 =

Theban tomb

Coordinates: 25.7333°N 32.6000°E

Theban tomb TT59
- Burial site of Qen
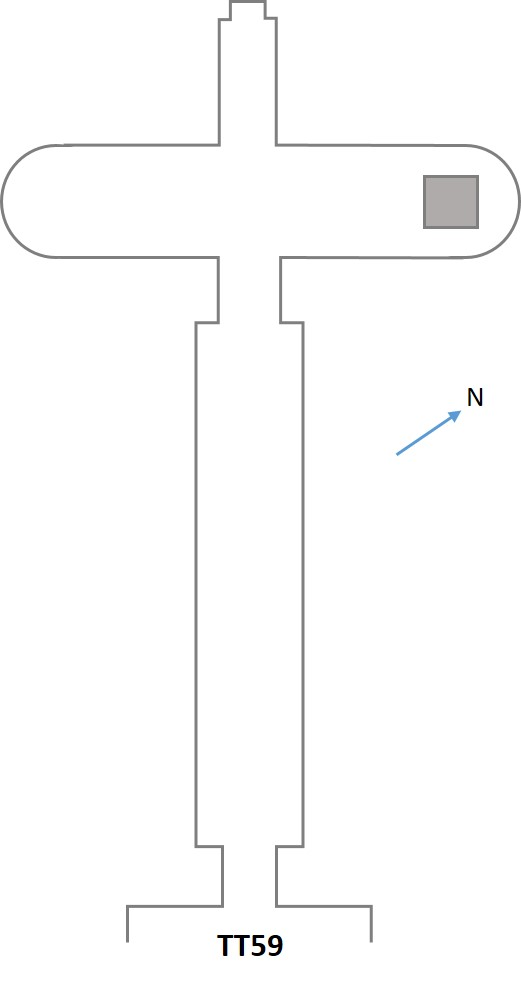

- Location within Egypt
- Location: Sheikh Abd el-Qurna, Theban Necropolis
- ← Previous; TT58 Next → TT60

The Theban Tomb TT59 is located in Sheikh Abd el-Qurna, part of the Theban Necropolis, on the west bank of the Nile, opposite to Luxor.

It is the tomb of Qen, First Prophet of Mut, Lady of Asher, during the reign of Thutmose III.

== See also ==
- List of Theban tombs
