= TT58 =

Theban tomb

Theban tomb TT58
- Burial site of an unknown courtier, and usurped by Amenhotep and Amenemonet
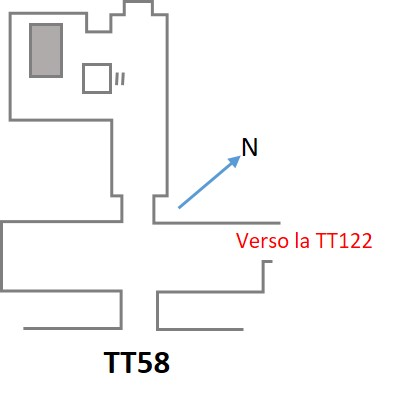

- Location within Egypt
- Coordinates: 25°44′N 32°36′E
- Location: Sheikh Abd el-Qurna, Theban Necropolis
- ← Previous; TT57 Next → TT59

The Theban Tomb TT58 is located in Sheikh Abd el-Qurna, part of the Theban Necropolis, on the west bank of the Nile, opposite to Luxor. The tomb was originally carved for a courtier dating to the time of Amenhotep III and later usurped during the Ramesside period.

== Tomb ==
The tomb was originally made for a courtier from the time of Amenhotep III during the 18th Dynasty. In the hall there is still a scene with the original owner appearing before Amenhotep III and the goddesses Hathor. Another scene shows the original owner and his wife with squatting divinities before Amenhotep III and Maat in a kiosk. Prostrate Syrians are depicted on the base of the kiosk.

i mn n Y1
Amenhotep
in hieroglyphs
Era: New Kingdom
(1550–1069 BC)

i mn n M K1 n t
Amenemonet
in hieroglyphs
Era: New Kingdom
(1550–1069 BC)

The tomb was usurped during the 19th or 20th Dynasty by a man named Amenemonet and his father Amenhotep.

Amenemonet (the son) is a scribe of the Sacred Offerings of Amun, Temple Scribe of Mut, and Scribe in the Temple of Ramesses II, "Beloved like Amun". Amenemone is accompanied by his wife Henutanensu. Amenemone's father Amenhotep was an Overseer of the prophets of Amun.

The hall of the tomb is decorated with scenes from the Book of Gates and the Book of the Dead. One of the texts mentions King Ramesses I. A scene from the tomb, now in the Cairo museum (JE 43591) depicts Amenemonet before the sacred bark of Amun. Amenemonet is shown accompanying the Vizier Paser.

== See also ==
- List of Theban tombs
