= TT60 =

Theban tomb

Coordinates: 25.7333°N 32.6000°E

Theban tomb TT60
- Burial site of Senet
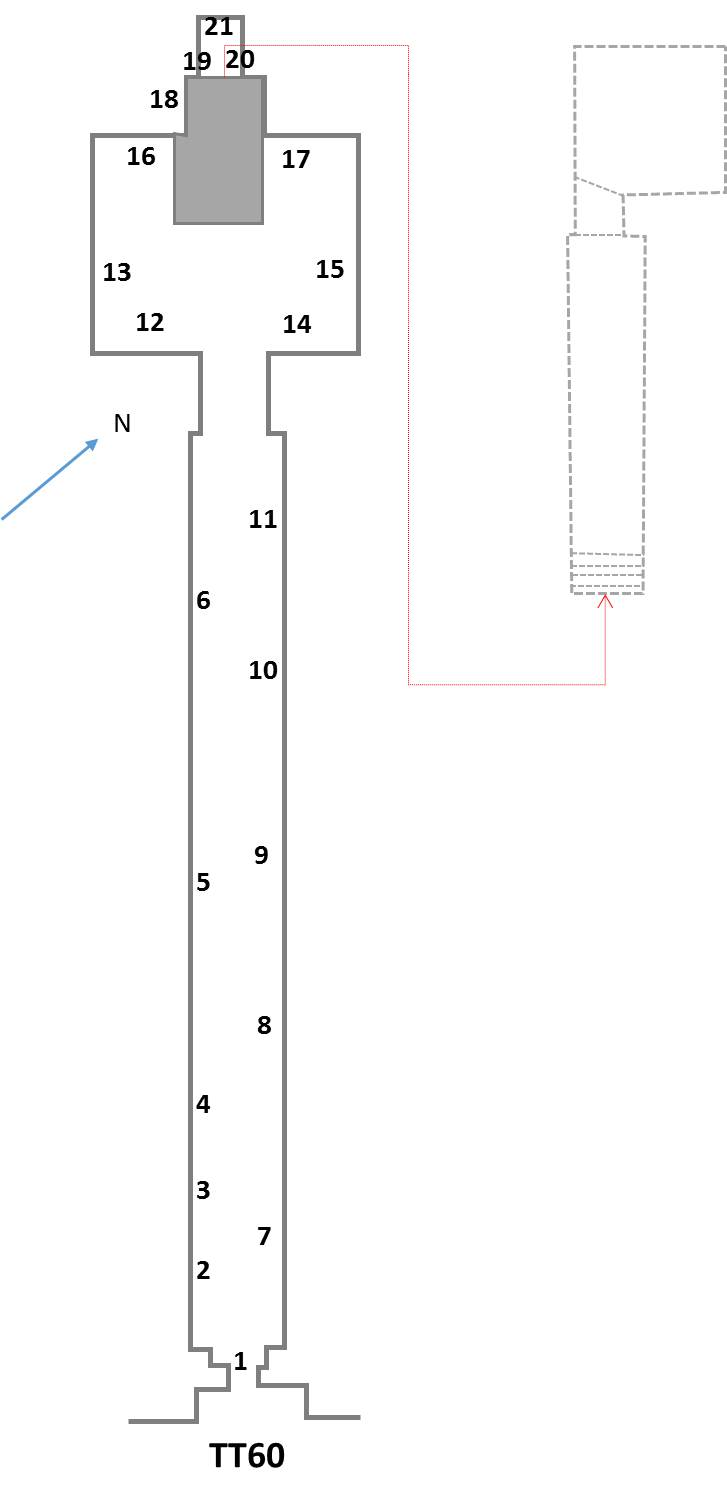
- Floor plan of TT60

- Location within Egypt
- Location: Sheikh Abd el-Qurna, Theban Necropolis
- ← Previous; TT59 Next → TT61

The Theban Tomb TT60 is located in Sheikh Abd el-Qurna, part of the Theban Necropolis, on the west bank of the Nile, opposite to Luxor. It is the burial place of a woman called Senet. She was related to the ancient Egyptian Vizier Intefiqer (mother or wife). It is one of the earliest burials in the area.

Intefiqer was overseer of the city and Vizier of Senusret I in the 12th Dynasty. The tomb's entrance leads into a long corridor, which in turn leads into an inner chamber with a deep niche. From this room a shaft goes down to the actual burial chamber.

In the innermost chapel, Senet is shown in front of an offering table. Other scenes show Intefiqer hunting and there is one (destroyed) scene showing the king Senusret I. Different scenes appear in the tomb decoration. On the north wall of the corridor Intefiqer is shown standing with a woman, called his beloved wife, the priestess of Hathor Satsobek.On the south wall of the corridor there was once the painted figure of king Senusret I. The figure is today mostly lost, but part of the crown and the throne name of Senusret I, Kheperkare are preserved.

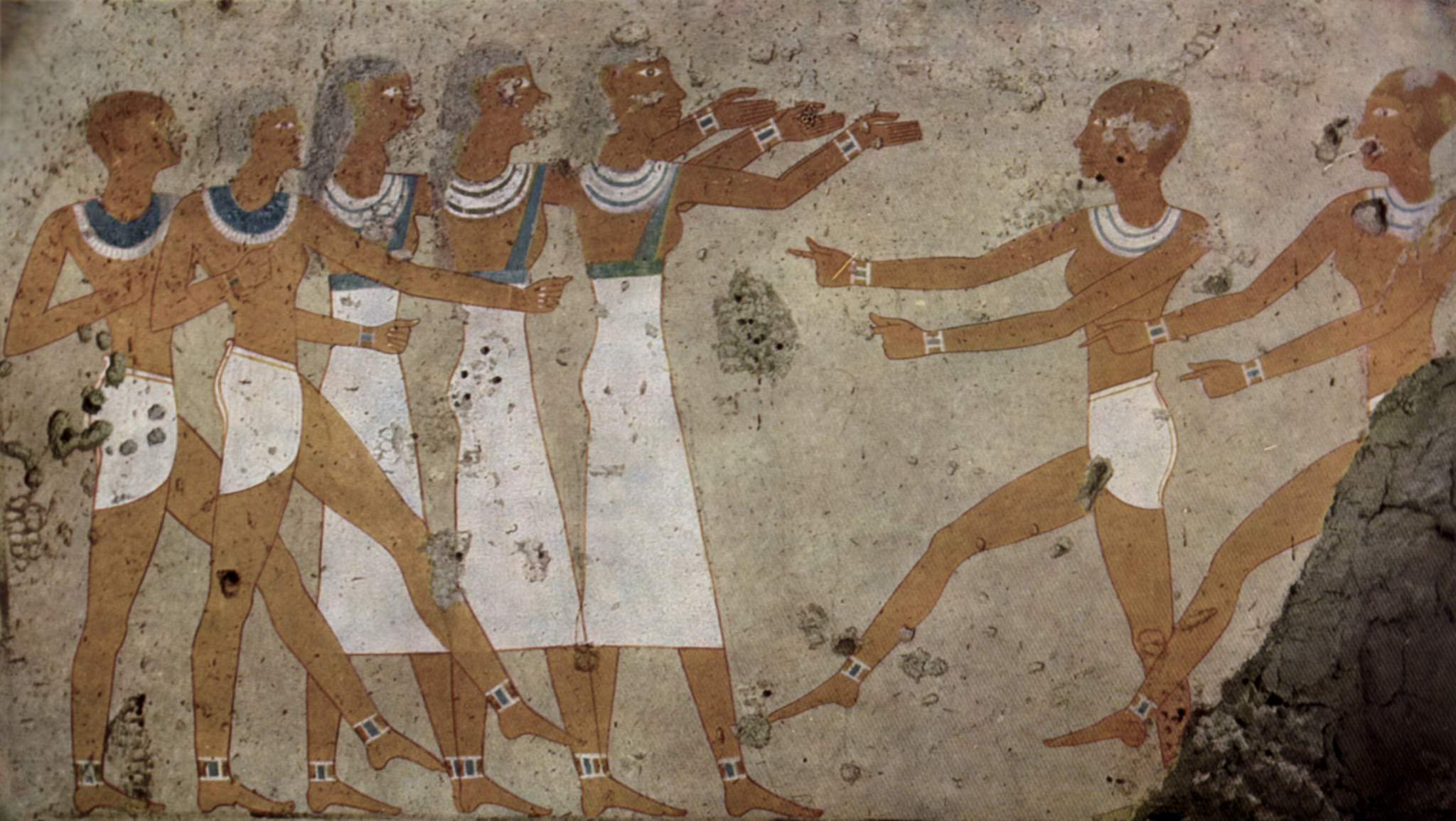
Painting of dancers in the tomb.

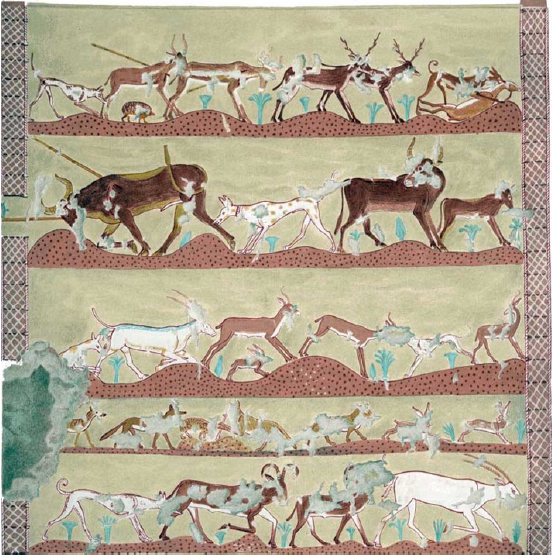
Hunting scenes from the tomb. Dogs and javelins are used to attack bubal hartebeest, Persian fallow deer, North African aurochs, Arabian oryx, dorcas gazelle, red fox, Cape hare, and Barbary sheep.

On the same wall appears Intefiqwe in a boat together with Senet on the journey to Abydos.On the same wall many funeral rituals are depicted. On this wall also appeared the figure of Intefiqer, that was fully erased. Behind him is sitting the tomb owner Senet, who is identified as his beloved wife.On the North wall a male figure was once shown twice hunting in the marshes. The figures were already in Antiquity fully erased. On the north wall Intefiqer is shown hunting in the desert. The figure is not erased. Intefiqer is here called born to Senet.

== See also ==
- List of Theban tombs

== Bibliography ==
- Norman de Garis Davies (1920): The tomb of Antefoker, vizier of Sesostris I, and of his wife, Senet (no. 60), London
