= Qeni =

- Superintendent of the Granary
- Predecessor: Siese the Elder
- Successor: Siese the Younger
- Dynasty: 19th Dynasty
- Pharaoh: Ramesses II
- Father: Siese the Elder
- Wife: Wiay
- Children: Siese the Younger, Tiy, called Nefertari, wife of the High Priest of Osiris Wennufer

Qeni was the Superintendent of the Granary during the reign of Ramesses II. Qeni and his family came from Asyut.

A dyad from Deir Durunka (MMA 17.2.5) records that Qeni was the son of Siese the Elder and that Siese the Younger was in turn his son.

Qeni is mentioned on a stela from Abydos dated to year 42 of the reign of Ramesses II. The stela is now in the Cairo Museum (CGC 34505). On the stela the King is shown offering to the gods Osiris, Isis and Horus. Qeni is mentioned as the father of Tiy, named Nefertari. Tiy was the wife of the High Priest of Osiris Wennenefer. The stela is dedicated to Wennenefer, the Vizier Prehotep and the High Priest of Anhur Minmose, who are all said to be brothers.
