= Khon (disambiguation) =

Khon is a drama dance genre from Thailand.

Khon may also refer to:

- KHON-TV, a Hawaiian television station
- Huron Regional Airport (ICAO code: KHON), an airport in the United States
- Khön clan of Sakya, a Tibetan clan and noble family

== See also ==
- Khons (disambiguation), several topics related to Ancient Egypt
