= Usermontu (vizier) =

Ancient Egyptian vizier during the 18th dynasty

- Vizier of the South
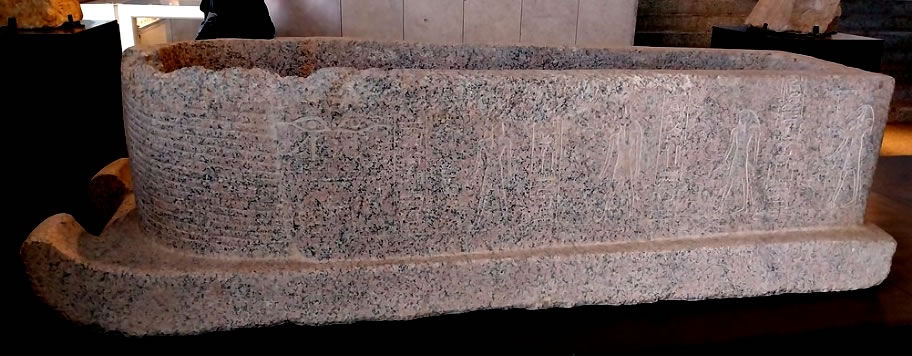
- Sarcophagus of Usermontu
- Dynasty: 18th Dynasty
- Pharaoh: Tutankhamun to Horemheb
- Father: Nebmehyt
- Mother: Raia

Usermontu was an ancient Egyptian vizier from the reign of Tutankhamun to likely the reign of Horemheb, during the 18th Dynasty.

Usermontu is depicted in the tomb of Khonsu called To (TT31). In the hall Usermontu and his brother Huy, who was a prophet of Montu are shown offering to the barque of Montu. Usermontu is said to be born of Maia. A statue from a private collection gives the name of his father as Nebmehyt. A second individual by the name of Usermontu is mentioned in the tomb, but this individual is the son of Khonsu. This younger Usermontu is a High Priest of Sobek.

The vizier Usermontu is also depicted in the tomb of the High Priest of Sobek, Hatiay (TT324). Usermontu is shown seated at a banquet with vizier Nebamun(?).

A stele of Usermontu was found in Armant. The text includes a hymn to Montu.
