= TT29 =

Theban tomb

Coordinates: 25.7333°N 32.6000°E

Theban tomb TT29
- Burial site of Amenemopet called Pairy
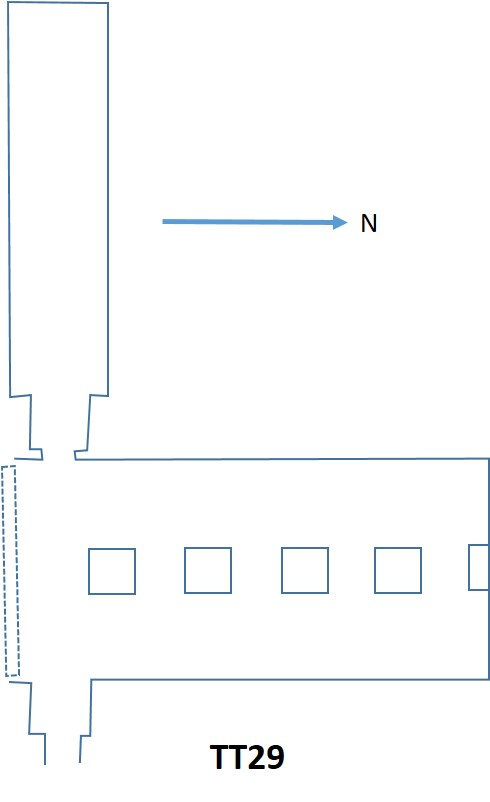

- Location within Egypt
- Location: Deir el-Medina, Theban Necropolis
- ← Previous; TT28 Next → TT30

i mn n m O45 t G40 i r Z4 Y1
Amenemopet (called) Pairy
in hieroglyphs
Era: New Kingdom
(1550–1069 BC)

The Theban tomb TT29 is located in Sheikh Abd el-Qurna, part of the Theban Necropolis, on the west bank of the Nile, opposite to Luxor. It is the burial place of the ancient Egyptian noble Amenemopet called Pairy who was vizier and governor of Thebes.

Amenemopet called Pairy was the son of Ahmose Humay (TT224) and Nub. His wife was called Weretmaatef. Amenemopet called Pairy was the cousin of Sennefer (TT96), and he had a son named Paser.

In the hall of the tomb six scenes are shown:

1. Amenemopet and his wife make offerings before the god Ra
2. Amenemopet offers to the ka of Amenhotep II
3. Texts detailing the duties of the vizier
4. Amenemopet is shown passing judgement as vizier.

The other two scenes contain more texts.

In the passage connected to the hall offerings to Amenemopet and his family are shown. He is depicted with his parents, his cousin Sennefer and his cousin's wife Senetnay, and his son Paser.

Amenemopet called Pairy was ultimately not buried here, as he later received a tomb in the Valley of the Kings called KV48, where his treasure and mummy were found.

== See also ==
- List of Theban tombs
- N. de Garis Davies, Nina and Norman de Garis Davies, Egyptologists
