= Amenemhat (High Priest of Amun) =

Egyptian High Priest of Amun

- High Priest of Amun
- Predecessor: Menkheperreseneb II
- Successor: Mery (High Priest of Amun)
- Dynasty: 18th Dynasty
- Pharaoh: Amenhotep II
- Father: Djehutyhotep
- Burial: Thebes, TT97

See Amenemhat (disambiguation), for other individuals with this name.

Amenemhat was an ancient Egyptian High Priest of Amun at Karnak, during the reign of pharaoh Amenhotep II of the 18th Dynasty.

A son of the wab-priest and "Overseer of the sandal makers of Amun", Djehutyhotep, Amenemhat is attested by several funerary cones now exhibited at the University College, London (UC 37551) and in the Metropolitan Museum of Art, New York; he also left an inscription outlining his career at Gebel el-Silsila.
He was probably buried in TT97 at Qurna, near Thebes.
