= Mery (High Priest of Osiris) =

- High Priest of Osiris
Egyptian name
mr i i A51
- Predecessor: Hat
- Successor: Wenennefer
- Dynasty: 19th Dynasty
- Pharaoh: Sety I, Ramesses II
- Spouse: Maianuy
- Father: Hat
- Mother: Iuy
- Children: Wenennefer, Prehotep I

Mery was an ancient Egyptian High Priest of Osiris at Abydos, during the reign of pharaoh Sety I and Ramesses II of the 19th Dynasty.

== Biography ==
Mery was the son of the High Priest of Osiris Hat. Mery succeeded his father in the role of High Priest of Osiris during the reign of Sety I, and continued in office for the first decade of the reign of Ramesses II. Mery's wife Maianuy was the daughter of the High Priest of Osiris To (also written as Tjay) who had preceded Hat in office.

Mery is known from several monuments shared with his son. A double statue of Wenennefer and his father Mery (Cairo JdE 35257) depicts both Mery and his son Wenennefer. The text on the statue identifies Mery as the son of the High Priest of Osiris Hat and his wife Iuy.

A family monument from Abydos (Cairo Museum JdE 35258) belonging to Wenennefer shows his father Mery holding two standards. The name of Ramesses II appears throughout the scenes.

A fragments from Wenennefer's tomb chapel Abydos contains text mentioning his parents Mery and Wiay, and his wife Tiy.
