= Prehotep =

Prehotep may refer to:

- Prehotep I, vizier in the latter part of the reign of Ramesses II
- Prehotep II, also vizier in the latter part of the reign of Ramesses II

Scholars disagree as to whether there were two viziers or just one with the name Prehotep.
