= TT31 =

Theban tomb

Coordinates: 25.7333°N 32.6000°E

Theban tomb TT31
- Burial site of Khonsu
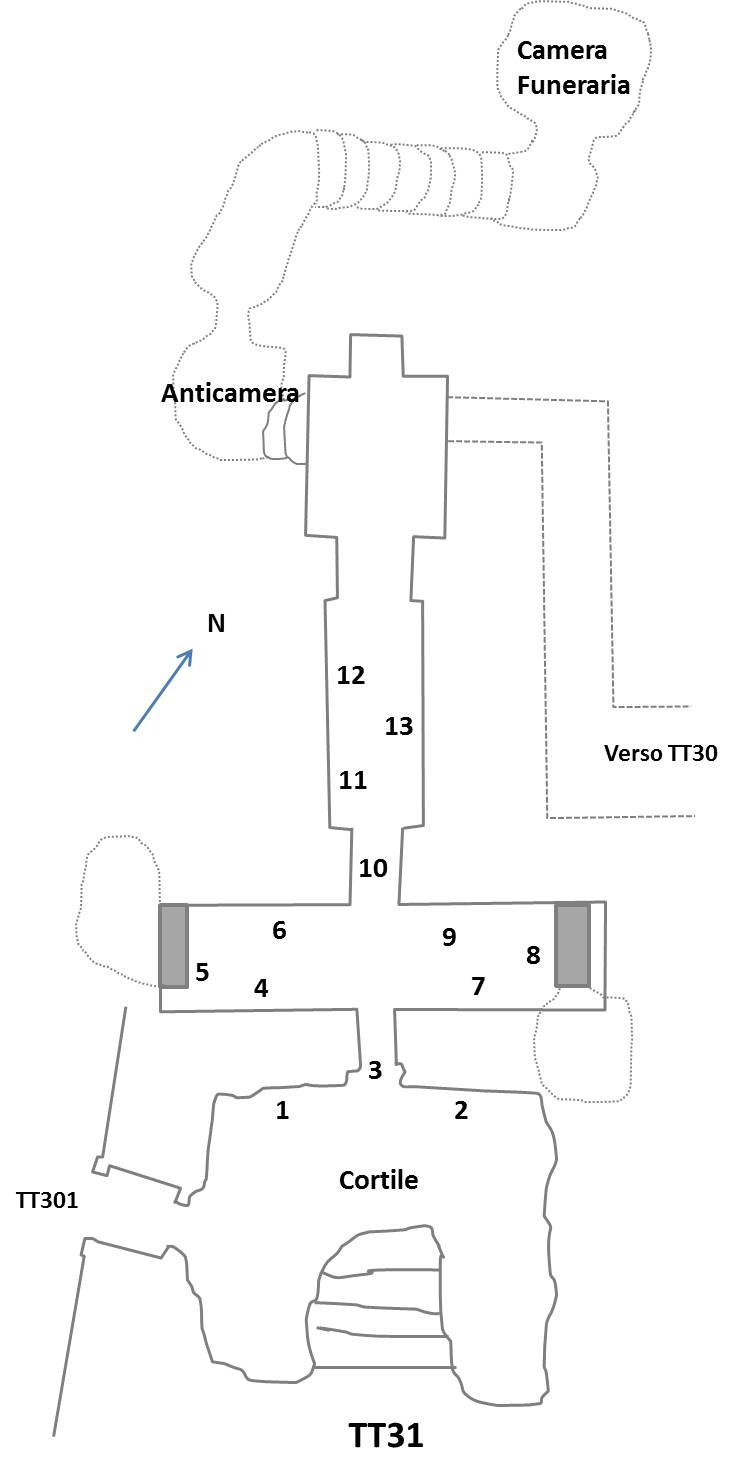

- Location within Egypt
- Location: Sheikh Abd el-Qurna, Theban Necropolis
- Discovered: Open in antiquity
- ← Previous; TT30 Next → TT32

Aa1 n sw w called N17 Z1 N21
Khonsu called To
in hieroglyphs
Era: New Kingdom
(1550–1069 BC)

The Theban Tomb TT31 is located in Sheikh Abd el-Qurna, part of the Theban Necropolis, on the west bank of the Nile, opposite to Luxor. It is the burial place of the ancient Egyptian official Khonsu, who was First Prophet of Menkheperre (Thutmose III), during the 19th Dynasty or 20th Dynasty.

== Facade and entrance doorway ==
Khonsu is depicted and is being served by Usermontu, who is a God's father, Lector of Ptah and a Deputy in the King's Temple on the West of Thebes. In the entrance doorway Khons is identified as the High Priest of the Lord of the Two Lands Menkheperre (Thutmosis III). His mother is said to be Tawosret, a chantress of Montu. The inscriptions further identify his son the stablemaster Usermontu, his wife (?) the Chantress of Amun named May, his son the Second Prophet of Menkheperre named Khaemwaset, and a daughter named Iuy.

== Hall ==
One scene shows two officials on the sacred barque of Montu. The two men are identified as the City-governor and Vizier Usermontu and the Prophet of Montu, lord of Armant, named Huy. Both Usermontu and Huy are said to be born of Maia. Four priests are depicted censing libating offerings. The men are identified as the High Priest of Akheperure (Amenhotep II), Neferhotep, his son the High Priest of Akheperkare (Thutmosis I), Nay, his son the High Priest of Akheperkare Iuy, and his son the Lector of Akheperure, Mentuhotep. A standard bearer on a tugboat is identified as Nebmehyt his father, Standard-bearer of the Great Company of Nebmaatre (Amenhotep III).

Another scene shows cartouches of Menkheperre on Feather-fans and a portable barque. A third scene shows two booths with royal cartouches. The booths all refer to Ramesses II. The booths are attended by five people: Userhat, Steward of Queen Tiye in the Estate of Amun, royal scribe; Khons, Superintendent of the cattle of Menkheperure (Thutmosis IV); Tawosret, Chantress of Montu, Lord of Armant; Mutiay, his wife; Iuy, his daughter.

Several people are shown attending offerings. The list includes Thutpai, God's Father and chamberlain of Menkheperre, a prophetess of Tanenet of Armant named Ry and her mother the chantress of Montu Mai. Another register shows three more women listed as "her daughter" named Tent[...], Nesinum and Ati respectively. Further registers show two charioteers named Raia and Iia on tugboats.

A fourth scene consists of several parts: one sub-scene shows a portable barque of Montu, accompanied by the High Priest of Montu named Ramose; another sub-scene consists of a speech made by a welcoming priest. Of interest is also a scene including two pylon towers. The text between the pylons is dedicated to Montu, while the text on the pylons refers to Thutmosis III (Menkheperre). One pylon is thought to depict the pylon at the Temple at Armant, while the other pylon is likely the VII th pylon of the Temple of Amun at Karnak. Khons is shown accompanying a statue of Thutmosis III as it travels up a canal from the Nile to the landing spot at the temple. The final scene on the left half of the Hall shows a text before a portable barque and several subscenes dedicated to the extended family of Khons.

The right half of the Hall depicts rites for the mummies and mourners.

== Doorway to passage ==
Khons is shown offering to Re-Harakhty with his wife, son and daughter. Khons' wife is named May, and the son is said to be Khaemwaset, son of May, and Second Prophet of Menkhperre. In the scene on the other side the officiant is Khons' other son Usermontu, a stablemaster and Superintendent of the Horse of the Lord of the Two Lands. Usermontu appears before Osiris and Isis. In the passageway a man (name lost) is shown offering a bouquet to Khons at the Temple of Montu. Another scene shows Khons offering flowers to King Nebhepetre Mentuhotep. The ceiling is inscribed with several hetep-di-nesu texts.

== See also ==
- List of Theban tombs
