= TT97 =

Ancient Egyptian tomb

Theban tomb TT97
- Burial site of Amenemhat
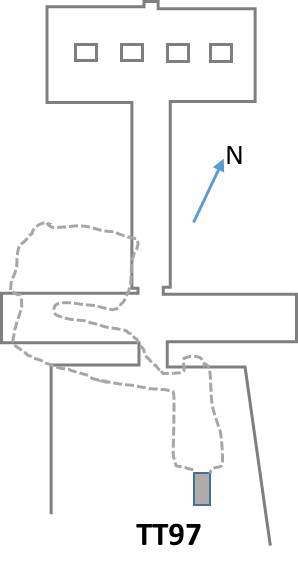
- Schematic of TT 97

- Location within Egypt
- Location: Sheikh Abd el-Qurna, Theban Necropolis
- ← Previous; TT96 Next → TT99

i mn n m F4 t Z1
Amenemhat
in hieroglyphs
Era: New Kingdom
(1550–1069 BC)

The Theban Tomb TT97 is located in Sheikh Abd el-Qurna, part of the Theban Necropolis, on the west bank of the Nile, opposite to Luxor. The tomb belongs to an ancient Egyptian named Amenemhat, who was the High Priest of Amun at Karnak, during the reign of pharaoh Amenhotep II of the 18th Dynasty. Amenemhat was the son of the wab-priest and "Overseer of the sandal makers of Amun", Djehutyhotep.

The tomb consists of a hall, a passage and an inner room. The hall is decorated with scenes depicting an inspection and offerings. The hall shows scenes of a funeral procession and a priest and lector before the mummy of the deceased. The ceiling is inscribed with offering texts. The inner room contains a stele with an autobiographical text, scenes of purification, offerings, and a pillar contains traces of a hymn.

In a burial chamber the coffin of a royal sandal maker of Amun, named Thu was found. The coffin is thought to date to the 18th Dynasty.

Amenemhat is attested by several funerary cones now exhibited at the University College, London (UC 37551) and in the Metropolitan Museum of Art, New York.

== See also ==
- List of Theban tombs
