= Nebamun (vizier) =

Ancient Egyptian Vizier

- Vizier of the North
Egyptian name
V30 i mn n
- Dynasty: 18th - 19th Dynasty
- Pharaoh: Horemheb to Ramesses II
- Father: Ramose
- Mother: Sheritre

Nebamun was a Vizier of Ancient Egypt. He served from about the reign of Horemheb to the reign of Ramesses II.

Nebamun is attested in the Memphite palace accounts early in Sethi I's reign.

His tomb is not yet known, but was most likely in Saqqara. Nebamun is depicted together with the vizier Usermontu in the Theban Tomb TT 324, showing that they were in office in about the same time. His main monument is a limestone statue found at Abydos, now in the Cairo Museum, providing a long list of titles. He was connected via family ties to the High Priest of Osiris, Wenennefer.
