= TT32 =

Ancient Egyptian tomb

Coordinates: 25.7167°N 32.4833°E

Theban tomb TT32
- Burial site of Djehutymose (Tuthmose)
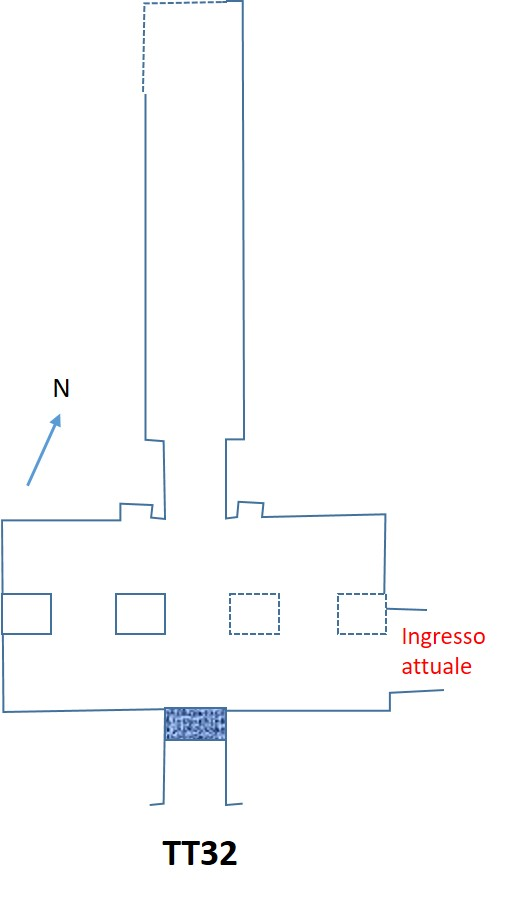

- Location within Egypt
- Location: El-Khokha, Theban Necropolis
- Discovered: Open in antiquity
- ← Previous; TT31 Next → TT33

G26 t Z4 ms s
Djehutymose
in hieroglyphs
Era: New Kingdom
(1550–1069 BC)

The Theban Tomb TT32 is located in El-Khokha, part of the Theban Necropolis, on the west bank of the Nile, opposite to Luxor. It is the burial place of the ancient Egyptian official, Djehutymose.

Djehutymose (or Tuthmose) was a chief steward of Amun and overseer of the granaries of Upper and Lower Egypt during the reign of Ramesses II (19th Dynasty). His wife Esi (Isis) is shown in the hall and the passage of the tomb.

It was later used by the Roman Soter family for burials in the first and second centuries CE.

In 2018, an excavation of the tomb by the University of Strasbourg resulted in the discoveries of two perfectly preserved coffins, each with a perfectly preserved mummy, one of which is a woman named Thuya. A thousand funerary statues were also discovered at the site.

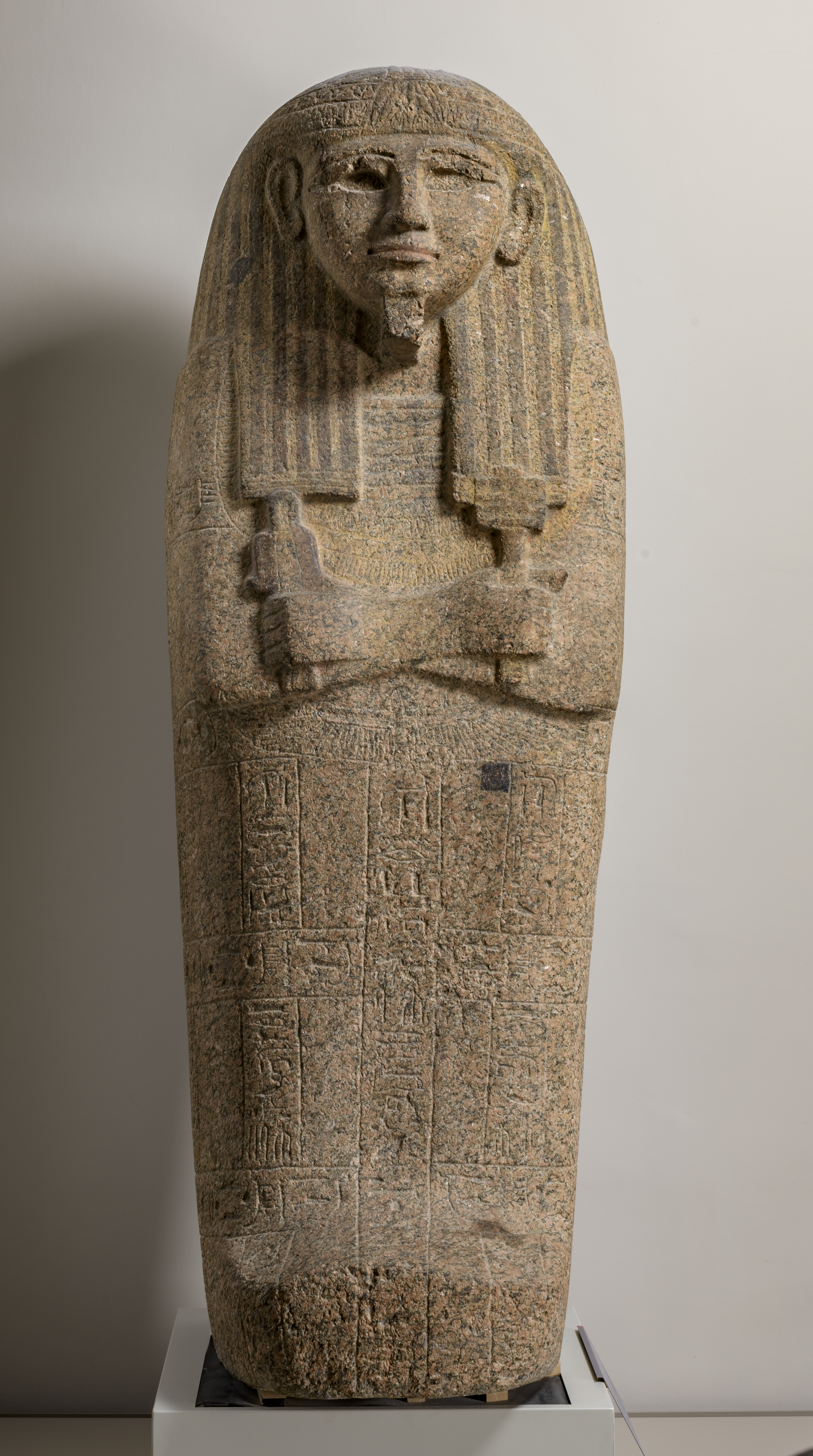
Lid of the mummiform sarcophagus of Djehutymes (or Djehutymose), great steward of the temple of Amun. Pink granite, with traces of painting. Museo Egizio, Turin.

Lid of the mummiform sarcophagus of Aset, singer of Amun and wife of Djehutymes. Pink granite, with traces of painting. Museo Egizio, Turin.

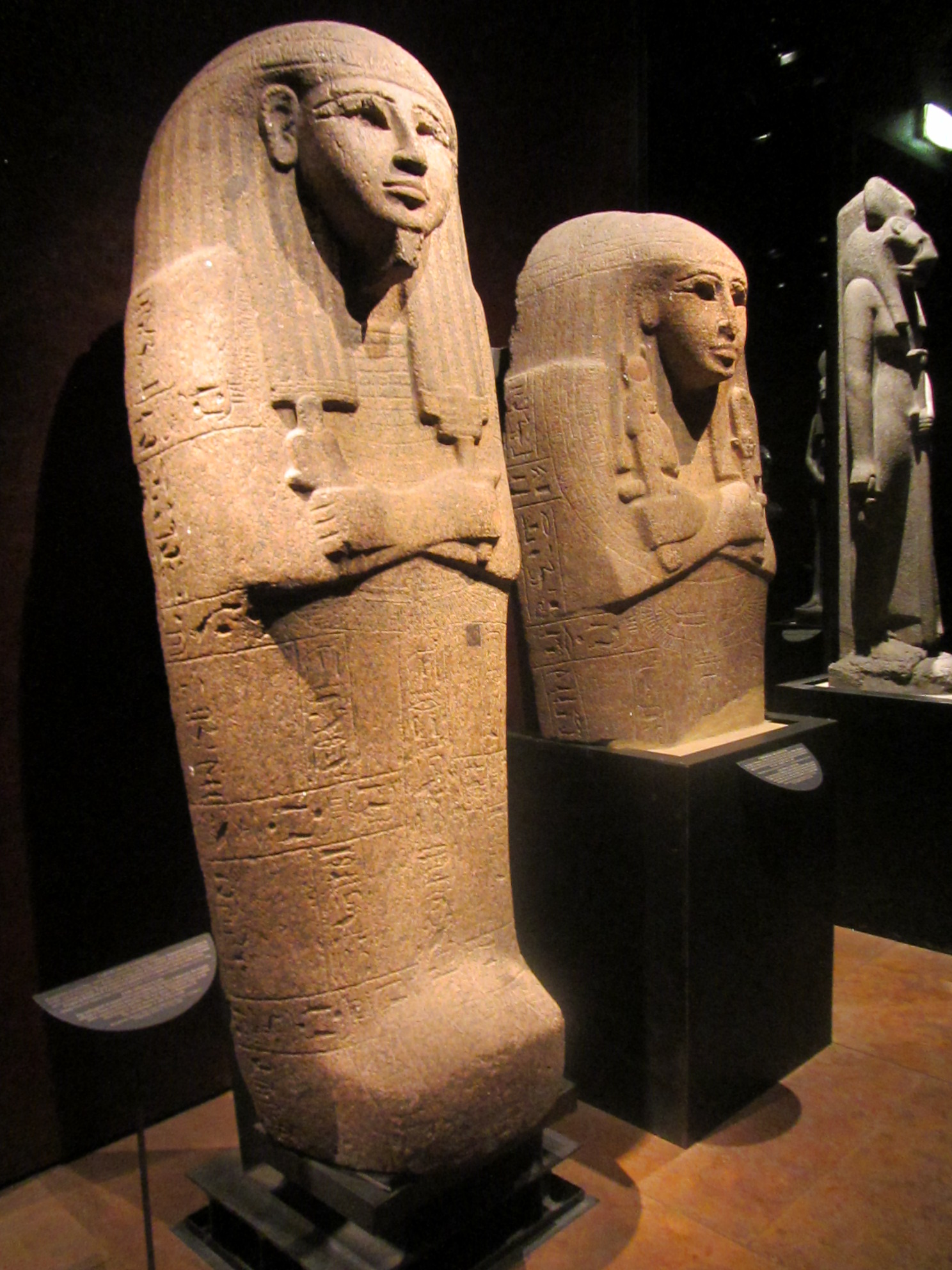
The two lids of the sarcophagi

== Finds ==
=== Ptolemaic Period ===
Lid from the sarcophagus of the royal scribe Shepmin

=== Roman Period ===
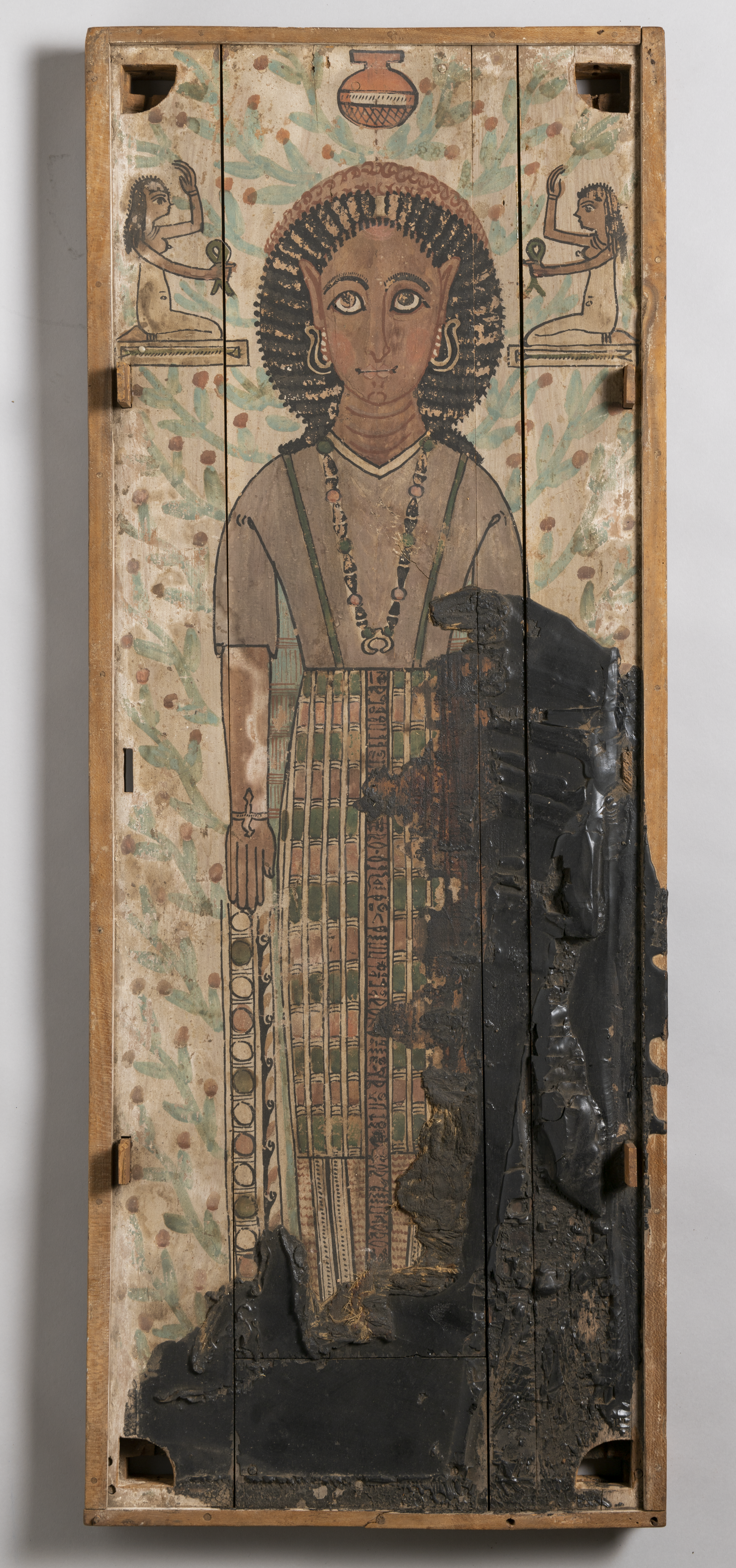
Sarcophagus of Petamenophis. Egyptian Museum, Turin.

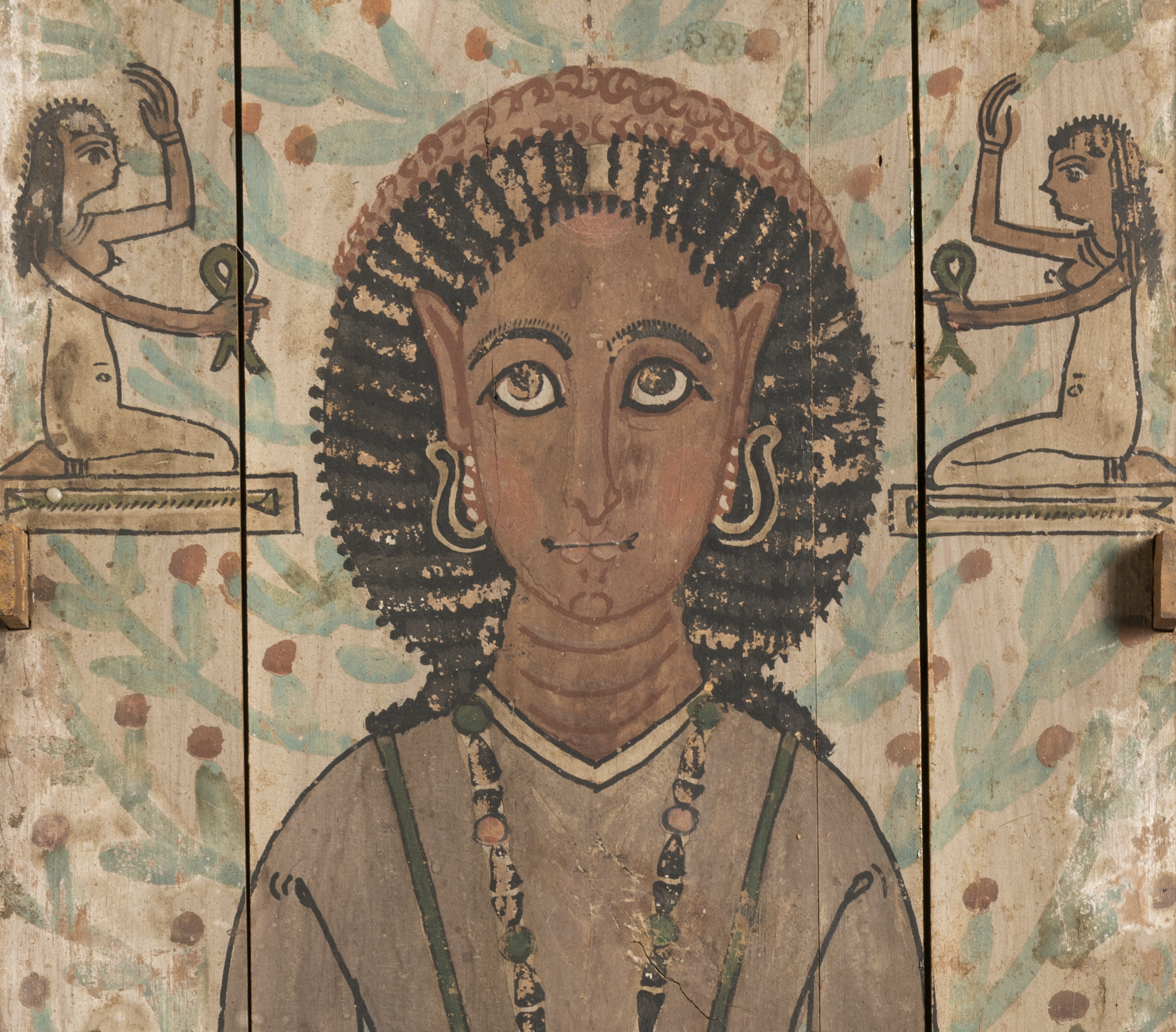
Sarcophagus of Petamenophis, detail with portrait of the deceased. Egyptian Museum, Turin.

Mummy of Petamenophis. Egyptian Museum, Turin.

== See also ==
- List of Theban tombs
