= Wenennefer (High Priest of Osiris) =

Ancient Egyptian high priest of Osiris

- High Priest of Osiris
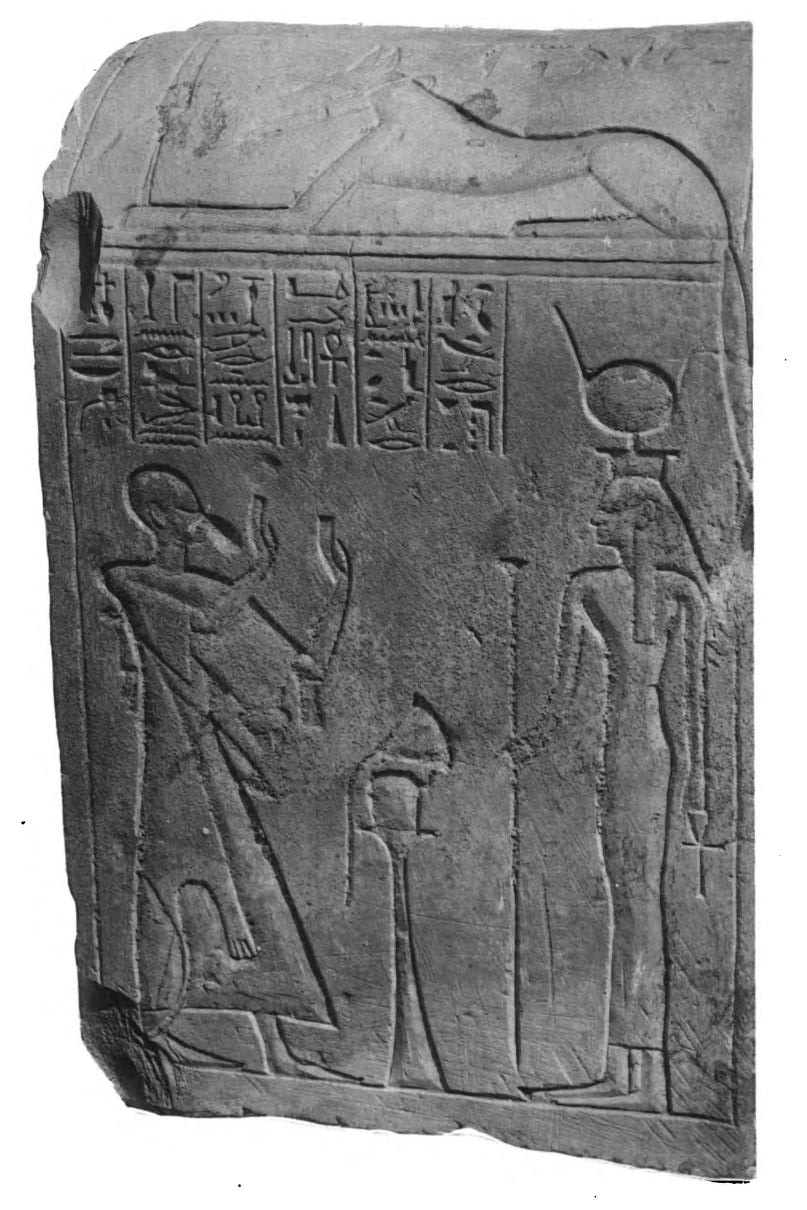
- Naos depicting Wenennefer (left) while adoring Isis, from Abydos
Egyptian name
wn n n nfr A51
- Predecessor: Mery
- Successor: Hori
- Dynasty: 19th Dynasty
- Pharaoh: Ramesses II
- Spouse: Nefertari-Tiy
- Father: Mery
- Mother: Maianuy
- Children: Hori, Yuyu

Wenennefer (also Wennefer, Wennufer or Unnefer) was an ancient Egyptian High Priest of Osiris at Abydos, during the reign of pharaoh Ramesses II of the 19th Dynasty.

== Biography ==
His name "Wenennefer" ("the one who continues to be perfect"), is one of the epithets of Osiris, which alludes to this god's post-mortem power.

Wenennufer was a son of the High Priest of Osiris Mery and the Chantress of Osiris Maianuy. He was married to Tiy also called Nefertari, the daughter of the Overseer of the Granary Qeni and his wife Wiay. Wenennufer and Tiy had at least two sons, Hori and Yuyu. Wenennufer's mother Maianuy was the daughter of the High Priest of Osiris To (sometimes called Tjay) and his wife Buia.

Following a practice typical of the New Kingdom, Wenennefer inherited from his father the office of High Priest of Osiris, and after thirty-five years of priesthood he left it to his son Hori, who in turn was succeeded by Yuyu.

== Monuments ==
=== Double statue of Wenennefer and his father Mery ===
The statue (Cairo JdE 35257) depict both Wenennefer and his father Mery. Wenennefer is said to be the son of Mery and Maianuy. Maianuy herself is identified as the daughter of the High Priest of Osiris To and his wife Buia. Wenennufer's Wife Tiy was the chief of the Harim of Osiris. She was the daughter of the Overseer of the Granaries Qeni and his wife Wiay.

The dorsal surface of the statue gives more information about the extended family of Mery and Wenennefer. Mery is said to be the son of the Dignitary and High Priest of Osiris Hat and his wife Iuy. The parents of Maianuy and Tiy are given again in the inscriptions. The scenes include further relatives. Several are listed as "his son": the Stablemaster Ramose, Prophet of Isis Yuyu, Second Prophet of Osiris Siese, Prophet of Horus Hor, and the Priest and Lector of Osiris Mery. There is also a row of women listed as "his daughter": Sheritre, Wiay, Istnofret, Mutnofret, and Buia.

=== Family Monument from Abydos ===
This limestone block comes from Abydos, but is now in the Cairo Museum (JdE 35258). One side shows Wenennufer flanked by two jackals. In the text he his accompanied by two men said to be "his brothers" the vizier Prehotep I and the Vizier Nebamun. It is not clear how these men are related because they are not real brothers. Another side shows Wenennefer with his wife Tiy and mother Maianuy in the presence of a barque. The third side shows Wenennufer and his son the Second Prophet of Osiris Siese. The fourth and final side shows Mery holding two standards. Mery is said to be the son of the Dignitary, God's Father and Sealbearer of Osiris Hat and his wife Iuy. The name of Ramesses II appears throughout the scenes.

=== Standing Statue with standards and Hathor emblems ===
This statue or architectural element comes from the funerary chapel of Wenennefer in Abydos and is now in the Athens Museum (Inv 106). Wenennefer holds two standards, where one is inscribed for Hathor, Lady of Medjet and Isis, Lady of Medjet, and the other Osiris and Anubis. Wenennefer also holds a Hathor emblem in front of him. The text on this monument provides more family information. Behind his right arm is a text about "his brother" the Vizier Nebamun, who is said to be the son of the dignitary and Sem Priest Ramose and his wife Sheritre. Behind his other arm is a text about "his brother" Prehotep I. Prehotep is said to be the son of the High Priest of Osiris Mery and his wife Maianuy.

=== Other ===
Further monuments include:

- A standing statue with a standard (Louvre A66)
- A stela from Abydos (Cairo CGC 34505)
- A sandstone panel stela (Louvre C97)
- Upper part of a sandstone stela (Cairo JdE 32025)
- Twin figures of Wenennefer and his wife Tiy from Abydos. (Peabody Museum 2657 - Yale 1937.213)
- Basalt statuette fragments from Abydos
- Granite block statue from Abydos (Bolton Museum 46.03.35)
- Sculptural fragments from Abydos mentioning Ramesses II
- Text of dated statue endowments (Pennsylvania University Museum E9930)
- Ebony inlay fragments from Abydos.
- Tomb chapel fragments from Abydos. Text mentions Wennenufer, his parents Mery and Wiay, and his wife Tiy.
- Funerary statuette from Umm-el-Qaab in Abydos.
- Block statue in private collection.
