= Siese the Elder =

- Superintendent of the Granary
- Successor: Qeni
- Dynasty: 19th Dynasty
- Pharaoh: Ramesses II
- Children: Qeni

Siese the Elder was the Superintendent of the Granary during the reign of Ramesses II. Siese and his family came from Asyut.

Siese is known from a statue now in the Louvre (A. 74). Siese is said to be a Real King's scribe and the Superintendent of the Granary. On the dorsal pillar of the statue Siese is also said to be a General, and his position in the Granary is given in more detail as the Superintendent of the Granary of the North and South.

Siese's name also appears on an ostracon (O. Gardiner 40) detailing a list of officials. He is named along with

- Mahu, the Steward and Superintendent of the Fields of Montu,
- Nakht, son of Pahedjet, the Superintendent of Partals/Judgement Halls,
- Mose, son of Raemwia, Superintendent of the Workshop/Stores of Khonsu
- Huy, son of Iyernutef, Treasury chief, Superintendent of the Fort
- Pakhenmes, singer of Min in Koptos
- Patutu, Policeman of the Estate of Amun-Re, King of the Gods
- Sonb-ihay, Cowherd of the Altar

Siese the Elder was the father of Qeni and the grandfather of Siese the Younger, as recorded on a dyad belonging to Siese the Younger.
