= Hori (High Priest of Osiris) =

- High Priest of Osiris
Egyptian name
G5 i A51
- Predecessor: Wenennefer
- Successor: Yuyu
- Dynasty: 19th Dynasty
- Pharaoh: Ramesses II
- Father: Wenennefer
- Mother: Tiy

Hori was an ancient Egyptian High Priest of Osiris at Abydos, during the reign of pharaohs Ramesses II.

== Biography ==
Hori came from a long line of High Priests of Osiris, He was the fifth holder of the High Priesthood in his family. He was the son of the High Priest of Osiris Wenennefer and the Chantress of Osiris Tiy.

Hori is known from several sources:

- A kneeling statue with a Horus figure, now in Copenhagen, Ny Carlsberg (AEIN 1492 - A.66)
- A kneeling statue with an Osiris figure, now in the University of Chicago Oriental Institute (OIC 7204)
- A limestone stela from Abydos from Mariette's excavations. Hori is shown adoring Osiris and Isis.
- A relief fragment now in Cairo.
- A small stela now in Cairo.
- His painted sarcophagus made between 1186 and 1070 B.C. is exhibited in Pápa, Hungary, since 1884.
