= Sennefer =

Ancient Egyptian mayor

- Mayor of Thebes
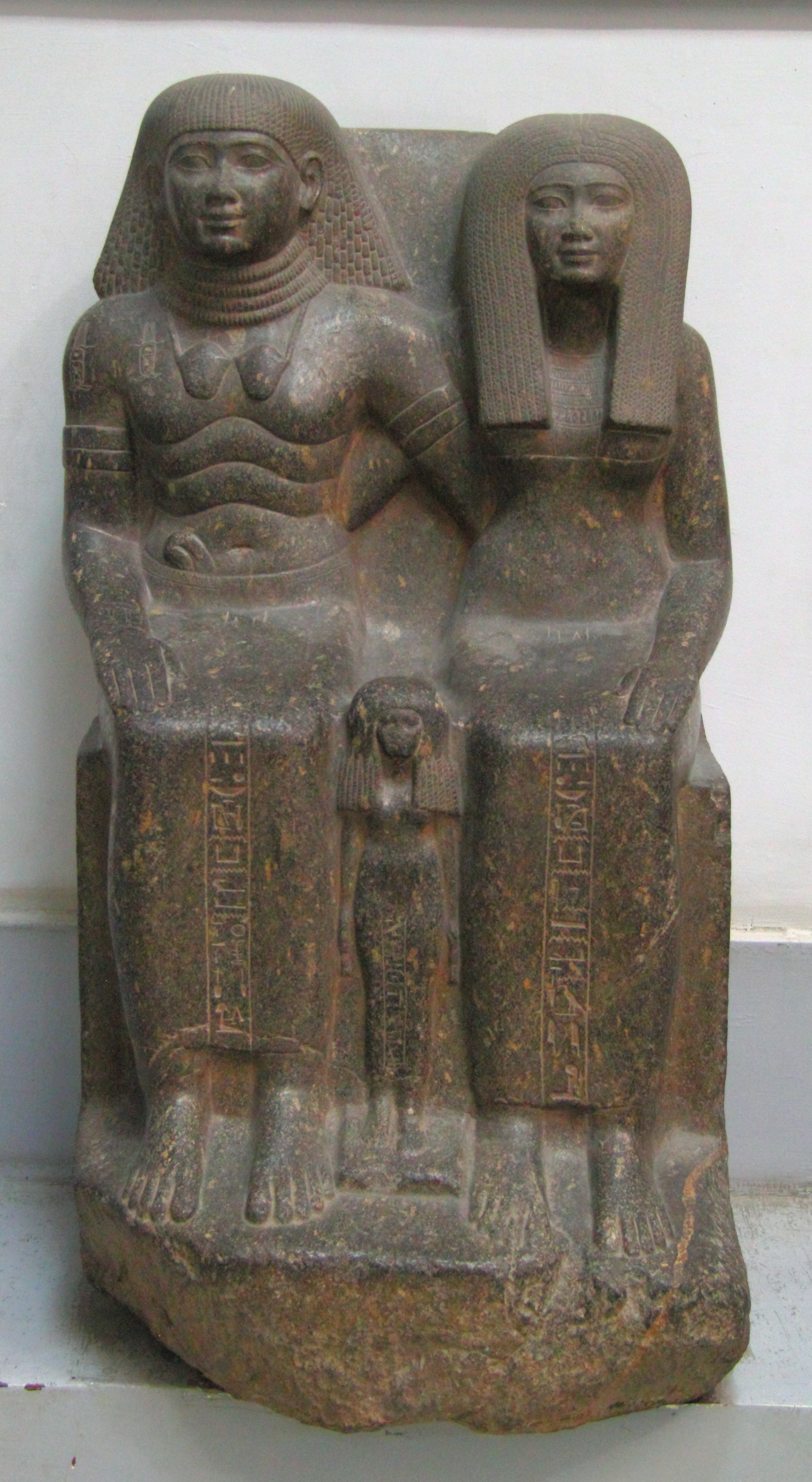
- Double statue of Sennefer and his wife Sentnay, from Karnak (Cairo CG 42126).
- Successor: Kenamun
- Dynasty: 18th Dynasty
- Pharaoh: Amenhotep II
- Burial: TT96 in Thebes, or maybe KV42
- Spouse: Sentnay, Meryt (?)
- Father: Nu
- Mother: Henutiry
- Children: Mutnefert, Muttuy and other daughters

The ancient Egyptian noble Sennefer was "Mayor of the City" (i.e. Thebes) and "Overseer of the Granaries and Fields, Gardens and Cattle of Amun" during the reign of Amenhotep II of the Eighteenth Dynasty of Egypt. Being a favourite of the king he accumulated great wealth. He was also allowed to place a double statue of himself and his wife in the temple at Karnak. The famous garden plan, often described as Sennefer's Garden, is more likely to be of a garden which Sennefer managed, and perhaps designed, than to be of a garden which Sennefer owned.

He was the son of the second priest Hor-wer in Qus, Nu; his mother was a woman called Henutiry, Tiiry. Sennefer is called son of the sister of Ahmose Humay, a male royal nurse, cousin to Amenhotep II's vizier Amenemipet called Pairy, and married to the royal nurse Sentnay. His elder daughter Muttuy apparently married Kenamun, who succeeded Sennefer as mayor of Thebes. His cousin Amenemipet called Pairy constructed a tomb close to Sennefer's, TT29.

He was buried in a small but well decorated tomb (TT96, sometimes known as the "Tomb of the Vineyards" due to its decoration), located in the Sheikh Abd el-Qurna district of the Theban Necropolis opposite Luxor in Egypt.

However, some funerary items for Sennefer and his family have been found in KV42, the tomb of Merytre-Hatshepsut, so he may have re-used this tomb for his actual burial. Some containers of Sennefer and Sentnay were also discovered in KV32, the tomb of Queen Tiaa, wife of Amenhotep II and mother of Thutmose IV.
