= Siese the Younger =

- Superintendent of the Granary
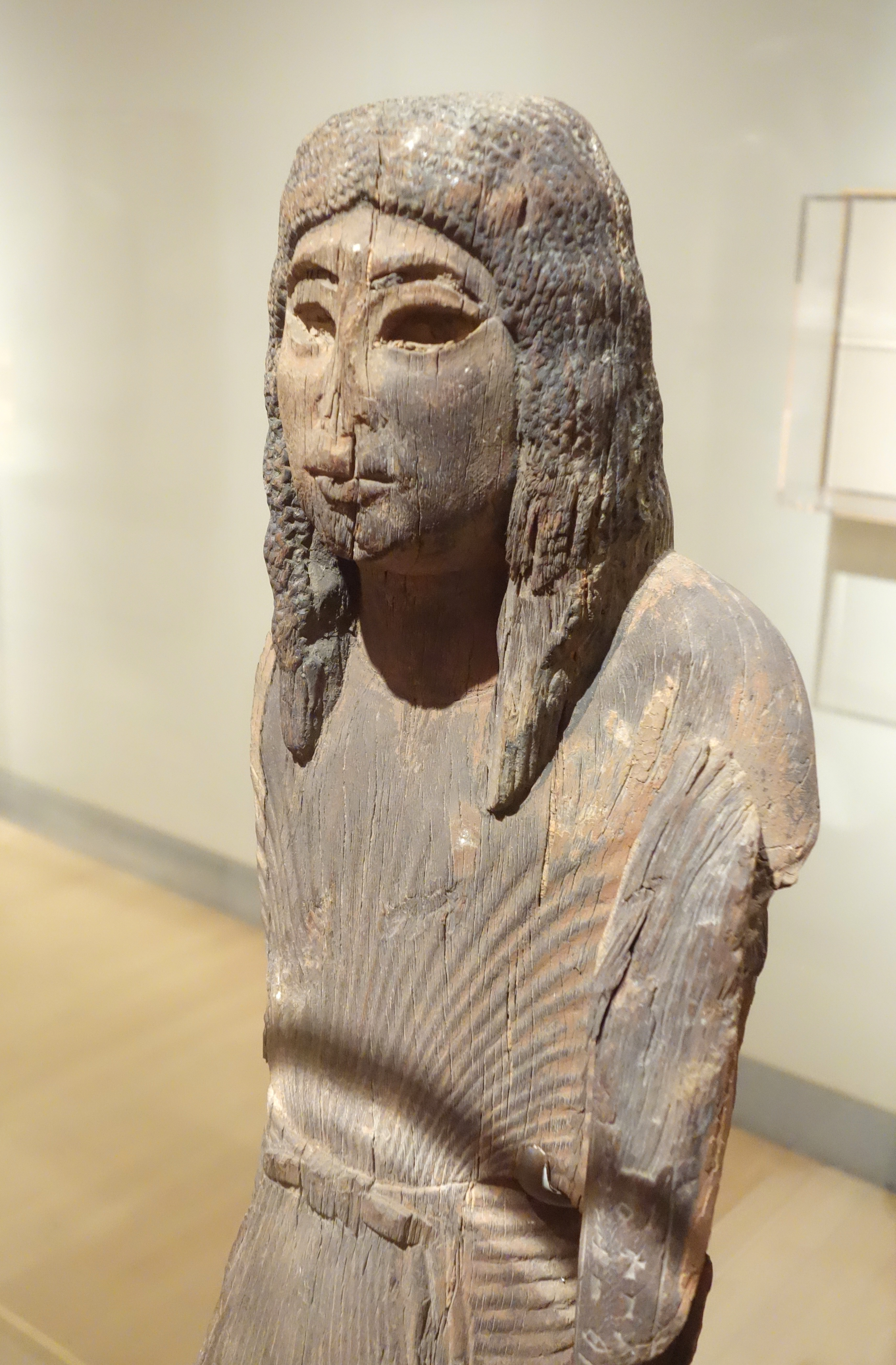
- Statue of Siese the Younger from the Brooklyn Museum
- Predecessor: Qeni
- Dynasty: 19th Dynasty
- Pharaoh: Ramesses II and Merenptah
- Father: Qeny
- Mother: Wiay

Siese the Younger was the Superintendent of the Granary during the reign of Ramesses II and Merenptah. Siese and his family came from Asyut.

A statue depicting the god Wepwawet on one side and the goddess Isis-Hathor on the other, was found in 1913 and may have come from Siese's tomb. The text on the rear surface states that Siese is the son of Qeni and the grandson of Siese the Elder.

Siese the Younger is further attested on:

- A statue from the Louvre (A. 73)
- A statue from the Kunsthistorisches Museum (ÄS 34)
- A statue now in the Brooklyn Museum (47.120.2)
- A relief fragment
- Sarcophagus
- Two ushabti figures
- A stela belonging to Menmare-em-hab.
