= TT93 =

Theban tomb

Theban tomb TT93
- Burial site of Qenamun
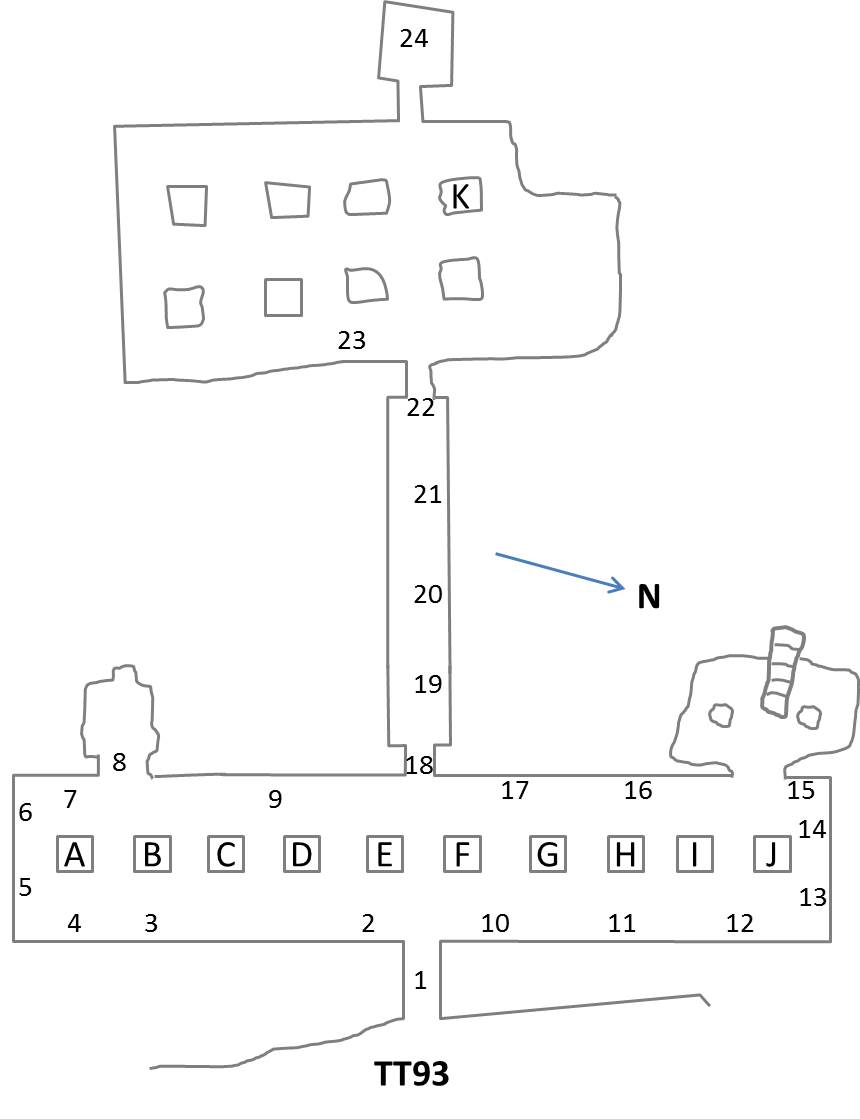
- Floor plan of TT93

- Location within Egypt
- Location: Sheikh Abd el-Qurna, Theban Necropolis
- ← Previous; TT89 Next → TT95

M17 Y5 N35 N29 N35 D40
Qenamun
in hieroglyphs
Era: New Kingdom
(1550–1069 BC)

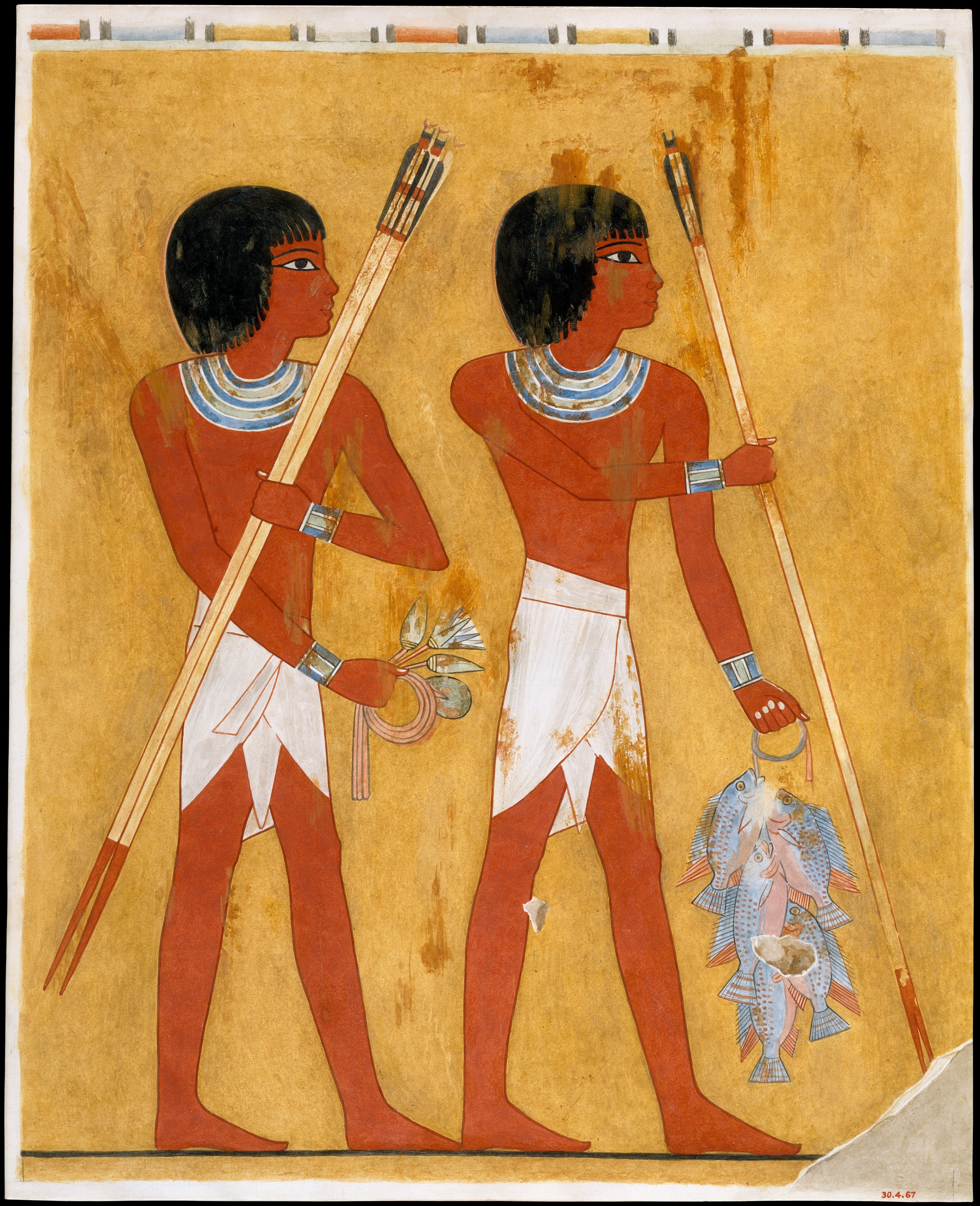
Detail from a Fishing Scene, Tomb of Qenamun MET DT10881

The Theban Tomb TT93 is located in Sheikh Abd el-Qurna, part of the Theban Necropolis, on the west bank of the Nile, opposite Luxor. The tomb belongs to an 18th Dynasty ancient Egyptian named Qenamun, who was the overseer of cattle of Amun and chief steward of Amenhotep II. More than eighty epithets of Qenamun were found in the tomb. Qenamun's mother, Amenemipet, was a wet nurse of Amenhotep II, which effectively made Qenamun a foster brother to the young prince who would become king.

== History ==
The tomb was known in the early nineteenth century and was visited by Champollion, Wilkinson, Lepsius and Prisse d'Avennes, but remained largely neglected until the late 1920s when the Metropolitan Museum of Art published The tomb of Ken-Amun at Thebes, which details the exploration and documents the content of the tomb.

== See also ==
- List of Theban tombs

== Bibliography ==
- Davies, Norman de Garis. (1930). The tomb of Ken-Amun at Thebes
- Gnirs, Andrea M. (2013). "Coping with the Army: The Military and the State in the New Kingdom". In Moreno Garcia, Juan Carlos (ed.). Ancient Egyptian administration. Leiden, The Netherlands. pp. 699–700, 710–711. ISBN 9789004250086.

- Pumpenmeier, Frauke (1998). Eine Gunstgabe von Seiten des Königs : ein extrasepulkrales Schabtidepot Qen-Amuns in Abydos. Heidelberg. ISBN 9783927552319.
