= TT30 =

Theban tomb

Coordinates: 25.7333°N 32.6000°E

Theban tomb TT30
- Burial site of Khonsumose
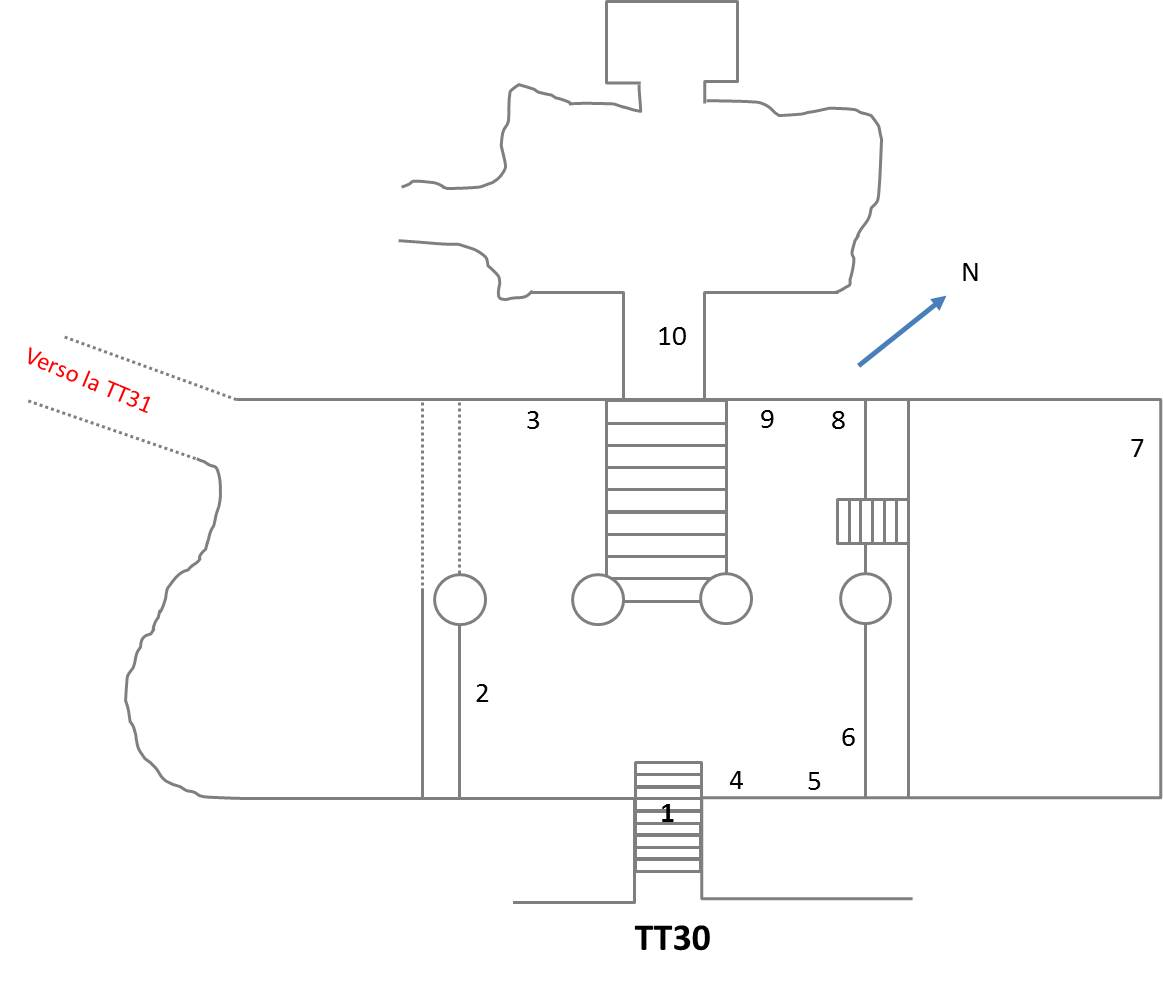

- Location within Egypt
- Location: Sheikh Abd el-Qurna, Theban Necropolis
- ← Previous; TT29 Next → TT31

Aa1 n sw w ms s
Khonsumose
in hieroglyphs
Era: New Kingdom
(1550–1069 BC)

The Theban Tomb TT30 is located in Sheikh Abd el-Qurna, part of the Theban Necropolis, on the west bank of the Nile, opposite to Luxor. It is the burial place of the ancient Egyptian official, Khonsumose.

Khonsumose was a scribe of the treasury of the estate of Amun during the Ramesside Period. His wife Henutenkhunet is mentioned in the tomb.

== See also ==
- List of Theban tombs
