= Yuyu (High Priest of Osiris) =

Ancient Egyptian high priest of Osiris

- High Priest of Osiris
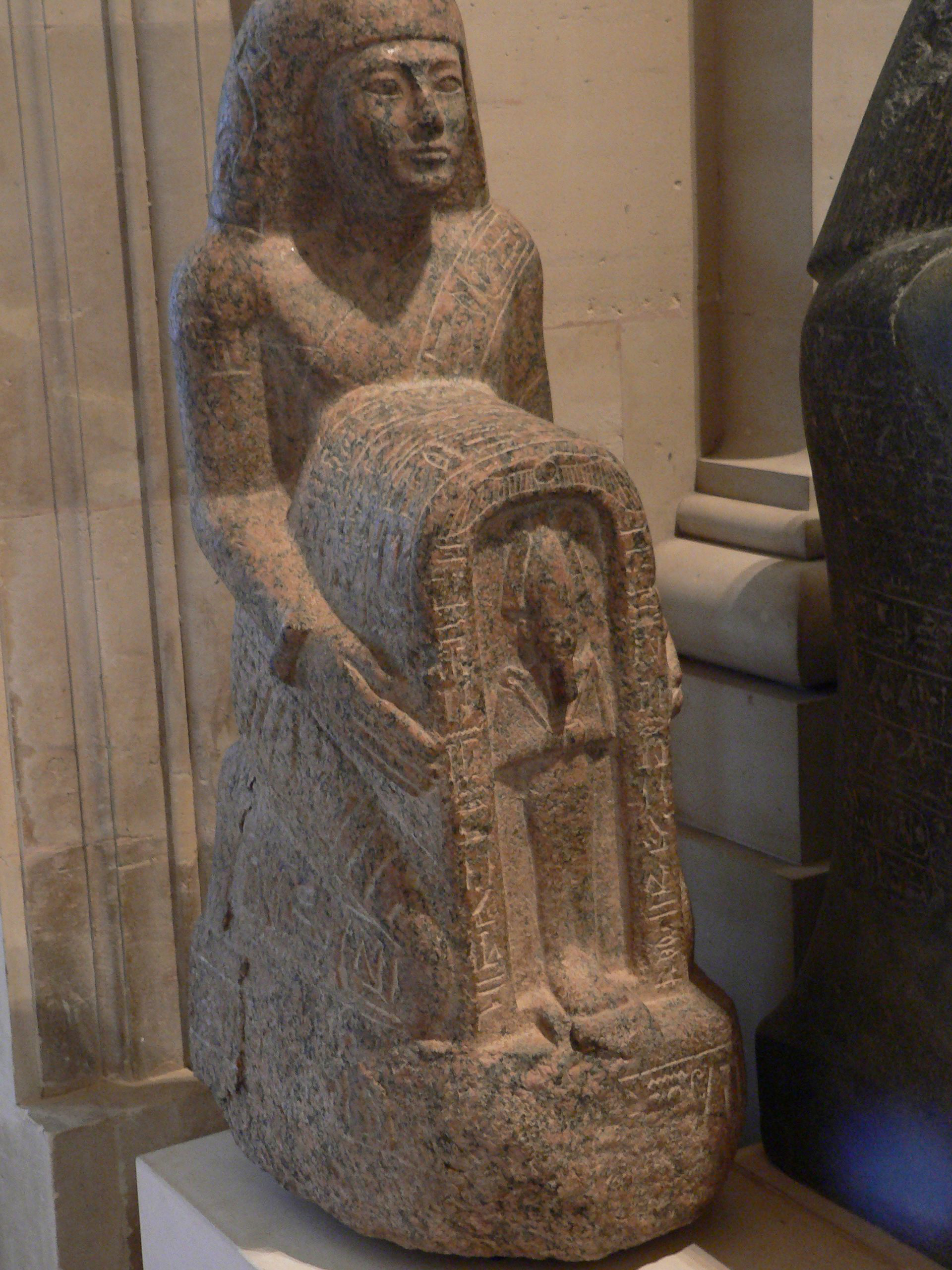
- Naophoros statue of Yuyu in the Louvre.
Egyptian name
i i w Z4 A51
- Predecessor: Hori
- Dynasty: 19th Dynasty
- Pharaoh: Ramesses II, Merenptah?
- Father: Wenennefer (High Priest of Osiris)
- Mother: Tiy, called Nefertari
- Children: Siese

Yuyu (sometimes written Iuiu) was an ancient Egyptian High Priest of Osiris at Abydos, during the reign of pharaohs Ramesses II and possibly Merenptah of the 19th Dynasty.

== Biography ==
Yuyu came from a long line of High Priests of Osiris, He was the sixth holder of the High Priesthood in his family. He was in the past thought to be the son of the High Priest of Osiris Hori, and grandson of the High Priest of Osiris Wenennefer. On the stela now in the Louvre, Yuya is however identified as the son of the High Priest Wennenefer and the Chantress of Osiris Tiy. This would make him a brother of the aforementioned Hori. In more recent publications Hori and Yuyu are both recognized as sons of Wenennefer.

Yuyu is depicted on a double statue of his father Wenennefer and his grandfather the High Priest of Osiris Mery. The statue (Cairo JdE 35257) shows the family of the High priest Wenennefer on the dorsal surface. Yuyu is depicted after his brother Ramose, who was a Stablemaster. Yuyu is listed as a Prophet of Isis. Yuyu is followed by his brothers the Second Prophet of Osiris Siese, the Prophet of Hor(us) Hor, and the Priest and Lector of Osiris Mery. In another row are the sisters of Yuyu: Wiay, Istnofret, Mutnofret and Buia.

Among Yuyu's monuments, there is a granite statue depicting him while holding a naos with the god Osiris, now exhibited in the Louvre (A 69). On the statue Yuyu has the titles of High Priest of Osiris, Chamberlain of the Chief of the West and Hesek-priest of the Lord of Abydos.

Yuyu's son and successor was Siese.
