= Khonsu (disambiguation) =

Khonsu is an ancient Egyptian lunar deity.

Khonsu, Khonshu or Khons may refer to:

- Khonsu (TT31), First Prophet of Menkheperre (Thutmose III), during the reign of Ramesses II in the 19th Dynasty
- Temple of Khonsu, Karnak, Luxor, Egypt
- Khonshu (Marvel Comics), a fictional character
- Khonshu (Marvel Cinematic Universe), a fictional character
- Khonsu, a fictional character in Stargate SG-1
- Khonsu, an Endbringer from Worm (web serial)
