= Hat (High Priest of Osiris) =

- High Priest of Osiris
- Predecessor: To
- Successor: Mery
- Dynasty: 19th Dynasty
- Pharaoh: Sety I
- Wife: Iuy
- Children: Mery

Hat was an ancient Egyptian High Priest of Osiris at Abydos, during the reign of Pharaoh Sety I of the 19th Dynasty.

== Biography ==
Hat succeeded the High Priest of Osiris To in office during the reign of Sety I. Hat may have been the brother-in-law of To. Mery's wife Maianuy was a daughter of To (also written as Tjay).

Hat is mentioned on a double statue of his son Mery and grandson Wenennefer (Cairo JdE 35257). The text on the statue identifies Mery as the son of the High Priest of Osiris Hat and his wife Iuy.

A Family Monument from Abydos (Cairo Museum JdE 35258) also mentions Hat. In this text Hat is said to be a Dignitary, God's Father and Sealbearer of Osiris.
