= Nebwawy =

Ancient Egyptian high priest of Osiris

- High Priest of Osiris
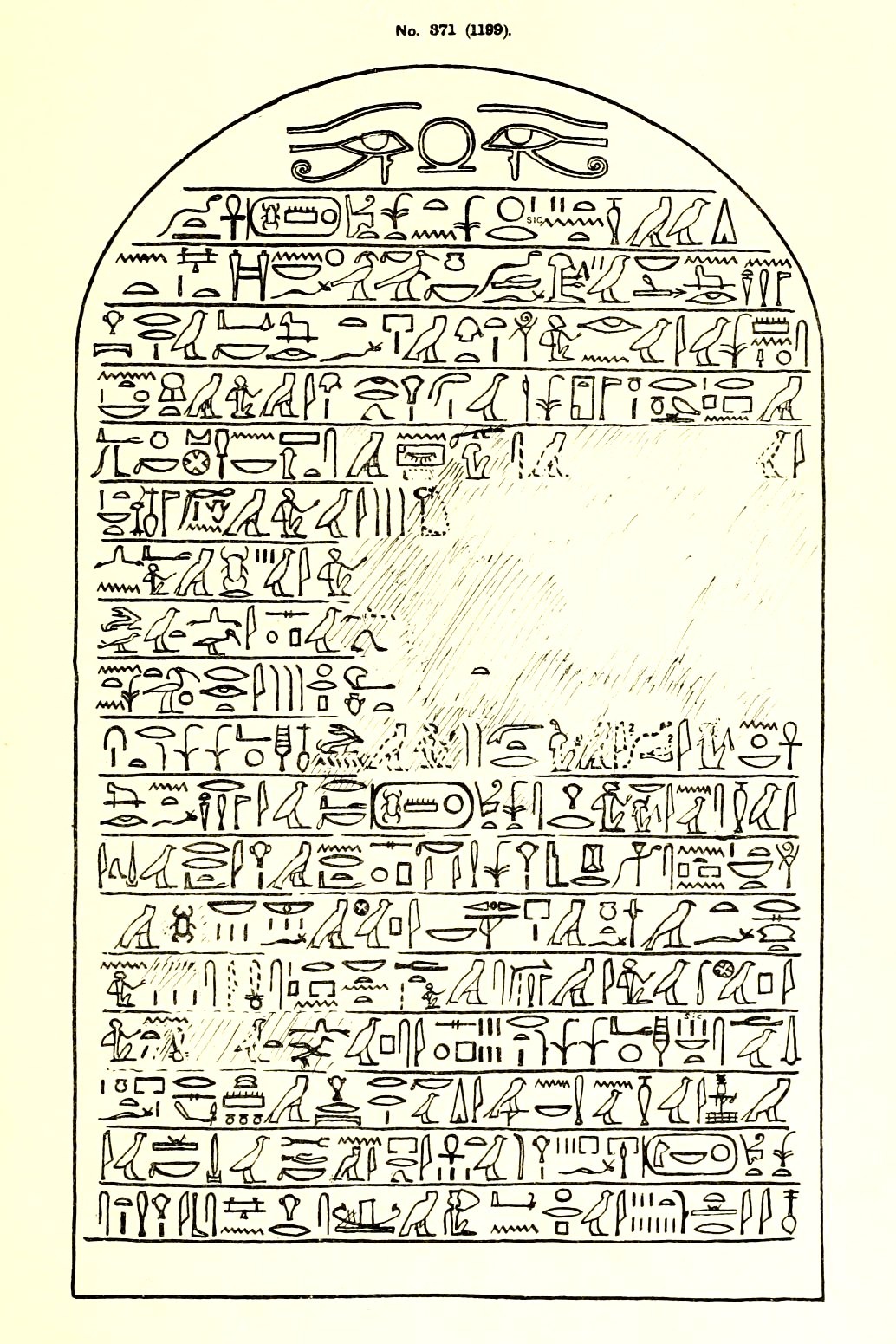
- Nebwawy's stela from Abydos, now at the British Museum (EA 1199)
Egyptian name
nb T21 w Z4
- Dynasty: 18th Dynasty
- Pharaoh: Hatshepsut, Thutmose III, Amenhotep II

Nebwawy (or Nebuāui) was an ancient Egyptian High Priest of Osiris at Abydos during the 18th Dynasty.

== Biography ==
Nebwawy's life is known thanks to some stelae from Abydos: the earliest narrates his career under the first nine years of Thutmose III, while the latest is datable to Amenhotep II's coregency.

Early in his career—likely under the late reign of Hatshepsut—he was a priest in charge to the cult of the deified pharaoh Ahmose I, and he also led some military missions, in one of which he overcame some rebels who were opposed to Hatshepsut. After the death of the female-pharaoh, Nebwawy managed to keep his prominent status: on many occasions he acted as a counselor of the pharaoh, and under Thutmose III he finally became High Priest of Osiris, a title which he held until his death occurred some time during the coregency of Amenhotep II.

As mentioned earlier, Nebwawy is attested on at least three stelae; the oldest is now in the British Museum (EA 1199), while the other two were both found at Kom el-Sultan near Abydos and are now at the Cairo Museum (CG 34017 / JE 6135, and CG 34018 / JE 2014).
