= Amenemipet called Pairy =

Ancient Egyptian Grand Vizier

- Vizier of the South
Egyptian name
i mn n m O45 G40 i r Z4 Y1
- Dynasty: 18th Dynasty
- Pharaoh: Amenhotep II and Tuthmosis IV
- Burial: Thebes TT29 and KV48 in the Valley of the Kings
- Spouse: Weretmaetef
- Father: Ahmose-Humay
- Mother: Nub
- Children: Paser

Amenemipet called Pairy (sometimes Amenemopet called Pairy) was a Vizier of ancient Egypt. He served during the reign of Amenhotep II and Tuthmosis IV.

== Family ==
Amenemipet called Pairy was the son of Ahmose Humay and Nub. He was the cousin of Sennefer, who is shown in Amenemipet's Theban tomb together with Sennefer's wife Senetnay. Amenemipet had at least one son named Paser, who is depicted in his Theban tomb.

== Tombs and burial ==
Amenemipet called Pairy has a tomb chapel in TT29 in Abd el Qurna in Thebes. His actual tomb was found in the Valley of the Kings. Tomb KV48 is an undecorated tomb in the western branch of the southwest wadi. It is located near KV35, the tomb of Amenhotep II whom Amenemipet served. The tomb contained among others some shabtis belonging to Amenemipet.
