= Mery (High Priest of Amun) =

High Priest of Amun

- High Priest of Amun
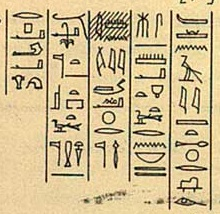
- Title of Mery from TT95 (From Lepsius Denkmahler)
Egyptian name
mr i i A51
- Dynasty: 18th Dynasty
- Pharaoh: Amenhotep II
- Burial: TT95 in Thebes
- Spouse: Dey
- Father: Nebpehtire, First prophet of Min of Koptos
- Mother: Hunayt, Chief nurse of the Lord of the Two Lands

Mery was a High Priest of Amun from the time of Amenhotep II (18th Dynasty).

Mery was the son of the First prophet of Min of Koptos, named Nebpehtire. His mother was Hunayt, a Chief nurse of the Lord of the Two Lands. Mery was married to a lady named Dey.

On digitalegypt his titles are listed as: Overseer of the Priests of Upper and Lower Egypt, High Priest of Amun, Overseer of the Fields of Amun, Steward of Amun, Overseer of the Granaries (of Amun), Overseer of the Treasury. See UC37790 and UC37791. A black granite statue of Mery can be found in the Cairo Museum CG 973.

== Burial ==
Mery had tombs made at TT95 and TT84. Mery usurped the tomb of the royal herald Iamunedjeh for himself and his mother.

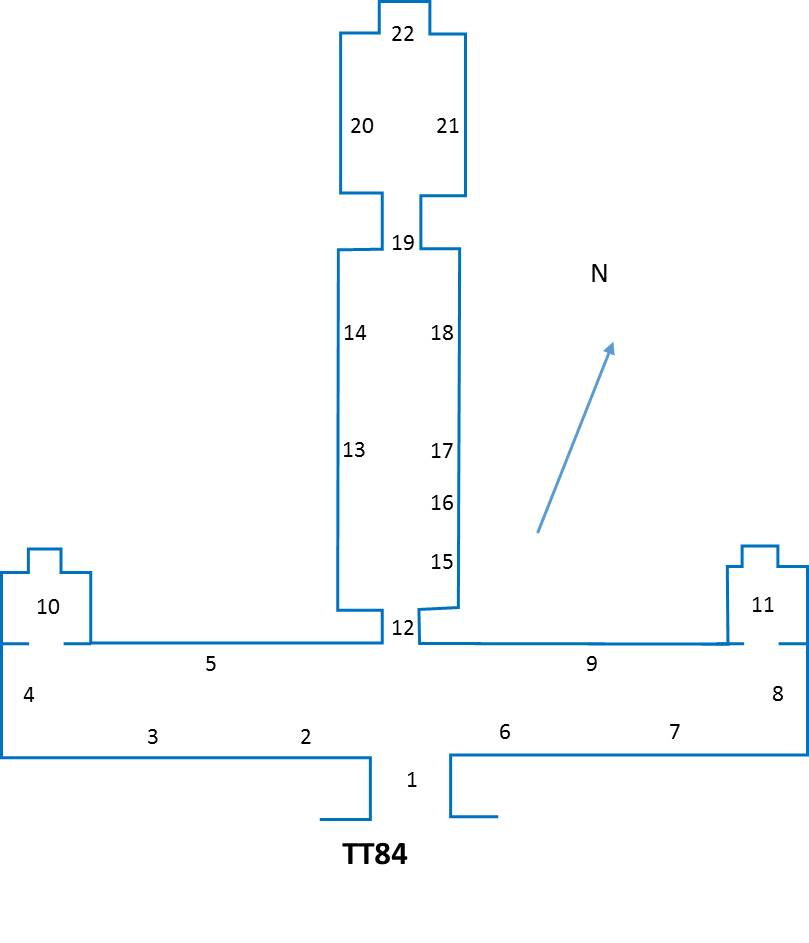
Plan of TT84
