= TT96 =

Theban tomb

Coordinates: 25.7333°N 32.6000°E

Theban tomb TT96
- Burial site of Sennefer
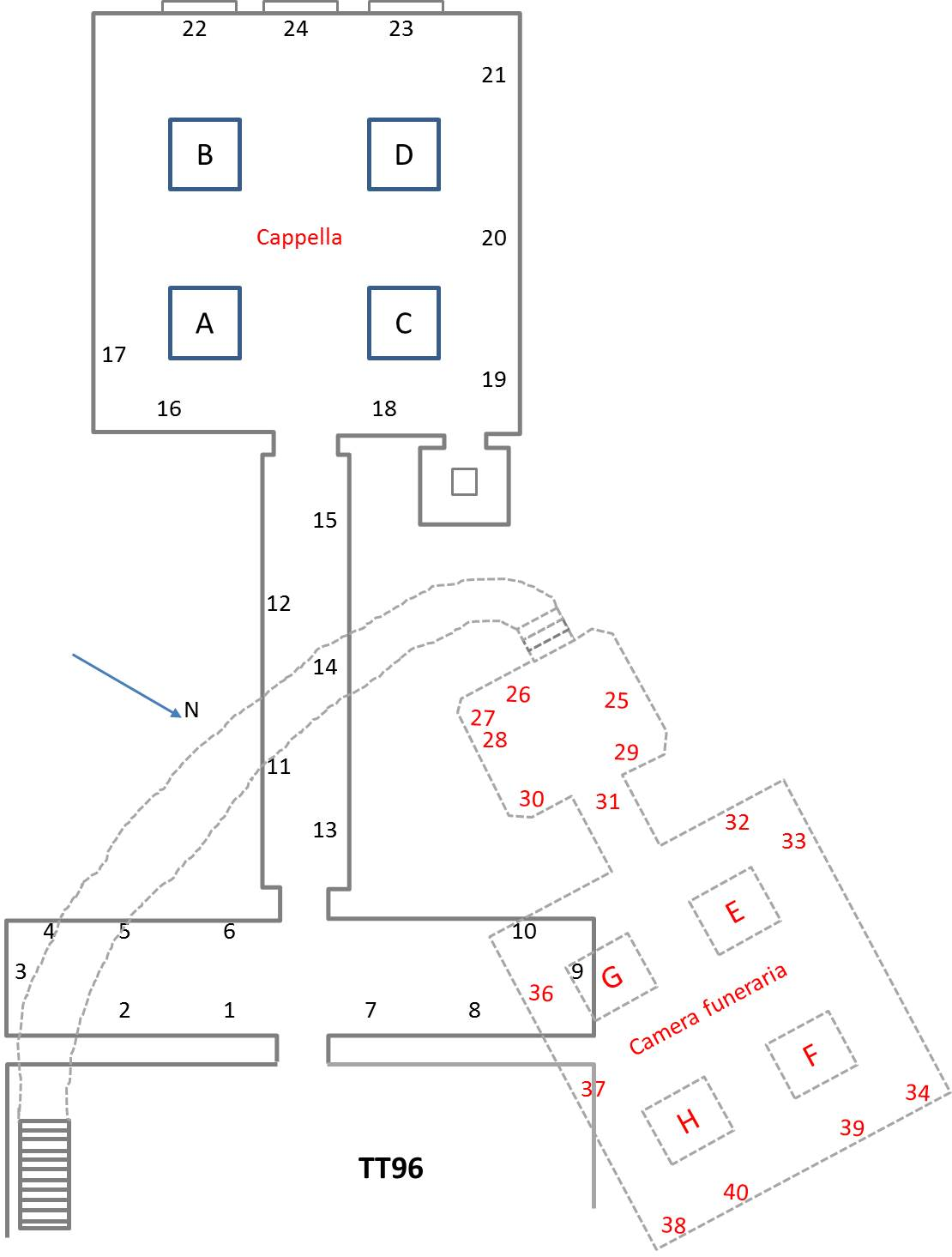
- Floor plan of TT96

- Location within Egypt
- Location: Sheikh Abd el-Qurna, Theban Necropolis
- ← Previous; TT95 Next → TT97

T23 F35
Sennefer
in hieroglyphs
Era: New Kingdom
(1550–1069 BC)

The Theban Tomb TT96 (sometimes known as the "Tomb of the Vineyards" due to its decoration) is located in Sheikh Abd el-Qurna. It forms part of the Theban Necropolis, situated on the west bank of the Nile opposite Luxor. The edifice is the burial place of the ancient Egyptian noble, Sennefer and wife Meryt.

== Tomb ==
The tomb is entered by a steep tunnel, which opens into a low chamber covered with painted decoration. This small chamber shows Sennefer entering the Underworld, with servants carrying boxes and a bed for his tomb. Passing through this chamber, the main burial chamber is reached through a doorway guarded by jackals The south wall show the funeral procession, the west wall shows offerings and the ritual journey to Abydos. The north wall shows Sennefer and his wife worshipping Osiris and Anubis, it also shows the embalming chamber, and purification of Sennefer and Meryt by a priest of the mortuary temple of Thutmose III. One of decorations has a graffito added at a much later date, showing that the tomb was open during the Greco-Roman period. The east wall again shows scenes of offerings and libation, the false doorway, through which Sennefer and Meryt are shown 'going forth by day'. The ceiling has three lines of hieroglyphic on the ceiling, two between the pillars, and further lines of text at the top of three of the pillars.

The pillars show scenes of Meryt offering myrrh, food offerings and lotus flowers to Sennefer, and scenes with Sennefer seated in the shade of trees with a table of refreshments, the fourth pillar shows Sennefer surrounded by priests while he stands on a hill of sand, part of the opening of the mouth ceremony.

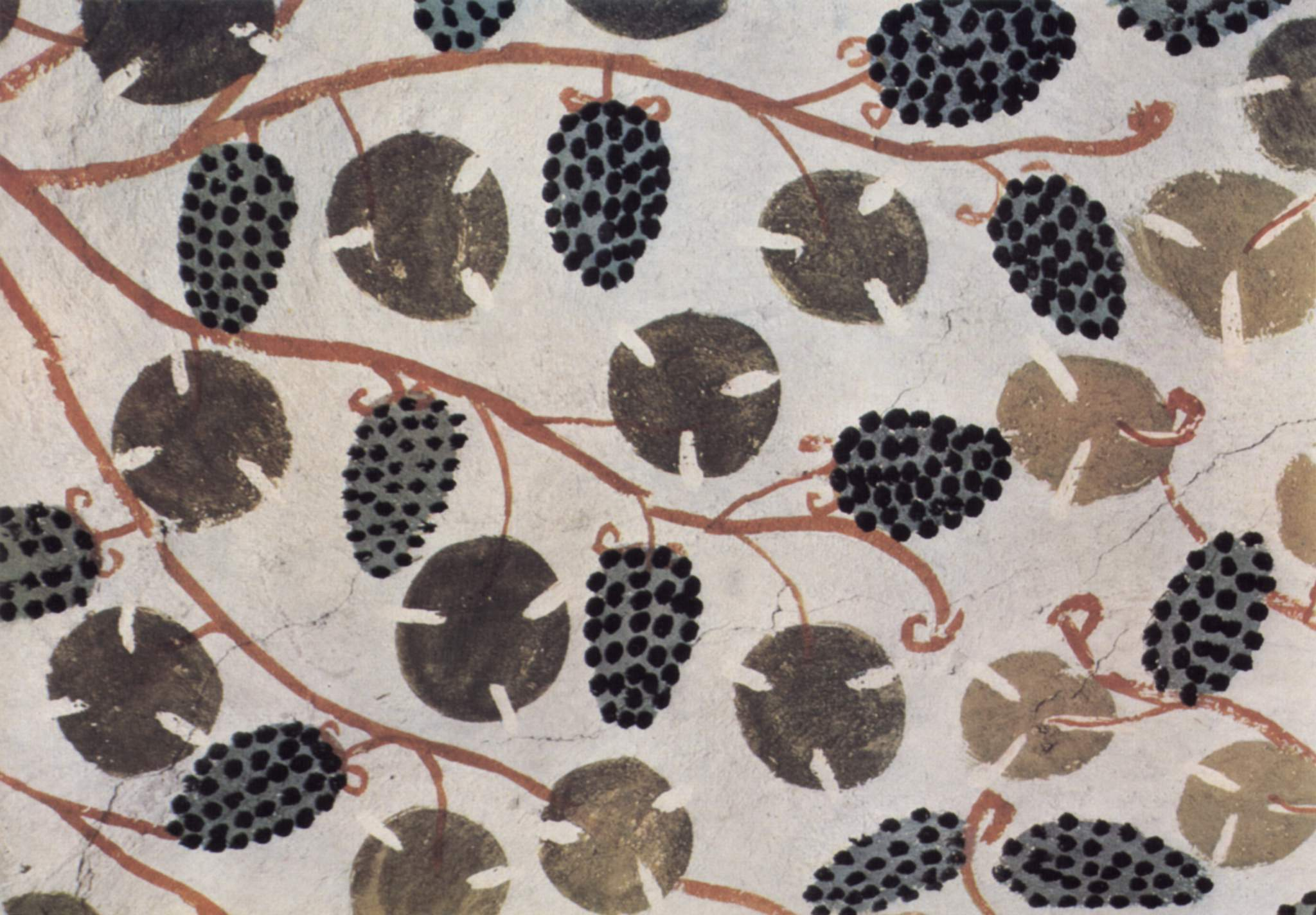
Details of ceiling decoration

== See also ==
- List of Theban tombs
