= TT95 =

Theban tomb

Theban tomb TT95
- Burial site of Mery
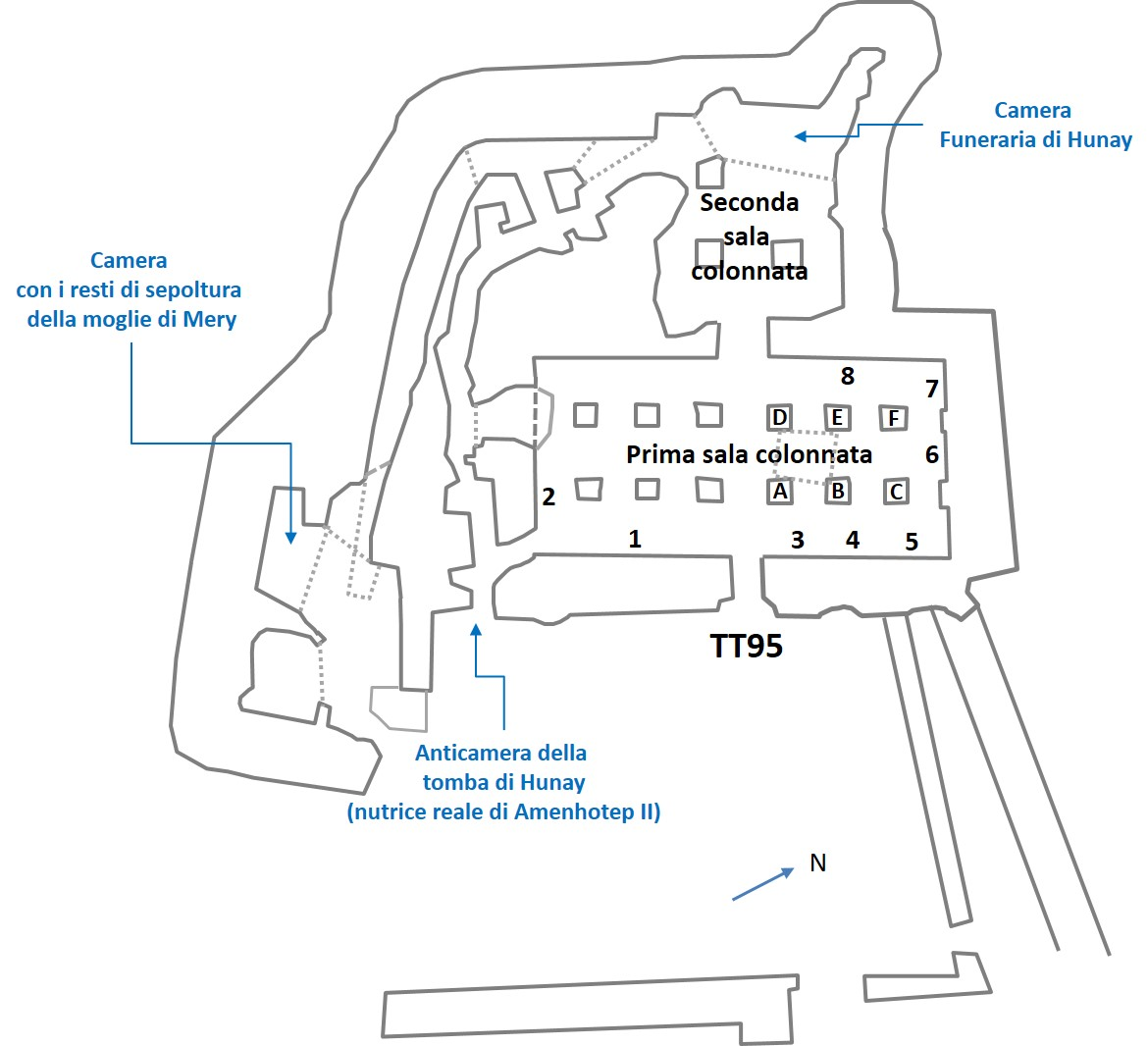
- Schematic of TT 95

- Location within Egypt
- Location: Sheikh Abd el-Qurna, Theban Necropolis
- ← Previous; TT93 Next → TT96

mr i i
Mery
in hieroglyphs
Era: New Kingdom
(1550–1069 BC)

The Theban Tomb TT95 is located in Sheikh Abd el-Qurna, part of the Theban Necropolis, on the west bank of the Nile, opposite to Luxor. The tomb belongs to an ancient Egyptian named Mery, who was a High Priest of Amun at Karnak, during the reign of pharaoh Amenhotep II of the 18th Dynasty. Mery was the son of the First Prophet of Min of Koptos (Qift) named Nebpehtire and the Lady Hunayt. Mery's wife was named Dey.

Mery also partially usurped the tomb of the royal herald Iamunedjeh TT84 for himself and his mother.

== Tomb ==
The tomb consists of a pillared hall and a subterranean complex including five burial chambers. The scenes in the hall show offerings made to Mery and his mother. Guests, musicians and dancers are depicted as well. Mery is shown inspecting cattle, the weighing of gold, chariot making and metal working in another scenes. The pillars are decorated with scenes showing Mery and his wife Dey "going forth to see Amun", the text of a New Year Festival, Mery and his mother consecrating offerings for Amun-Re Harakhti and Amenhotep II.

One burial chamber is located at the end of a long passage (chamber 1) and the burials in chamber 1 date to the 18th Dynasty. The other four chambers form a complex and are entered from a location outside the burial chapel. The burials in the four chambers date between the 18th and 22nd Dynasties.

An additional shaft with a burial chamber was added to the tomb during a later period (21st and 22nd Dynasties).

== Human remains ==
Grave robberies have damaged the burials to an extent that it is not clear exactly how many individuals were laid to rest in the tomb. Chamber 1 contained the burial of four individuals: two males and two females. The four connected chambers and associated passageway contained 29 individuals. Of these burials eight were male, nine were female and for the rest the gender could not be determined. Further burials were found in the hall and the total number of individuals is said to be 73.

== See also ==
- List of Theban tombs
