= High Priest of Osiris =

Ancient Egyptian priestly title

R8 U36 T8 n Q1 D4
High Priest of Osiris
Hm nTr tp n Wsjr
in hieroglyphs
Era: New Kingdom
(1550–1069 BC)

The High Priest of Osiris served at Abydos. Some high priests were:

Image of Osiris

High Priest	Reign	Dynasty	Comments
Nebwawy	Thutmose III	18th Dynasty	
Heqanefer	Thutmose III, Amenhotep II	18th Dynasty	
To	Horemheb, Ramesses I	18th Dynasty	
Hat	Ramesses I, Seti I	19th Dynasty	Possibly brother-in-law of To
Mery	Seti I, Ramesses II	19th Dynasty	Son of the High Priest of Osiris Hat and his wife Iuy. Mery's wife Maianuy was the daughter of the High Priest of Osiris, To, justified, born of Buia.
Wenennefer	Ramesses II	19th Dynasty	Son of the High Priest of Osiris Mery and his wife Maianuy.
Hori	Ramesses II	19th Dynasty	Son of the High Priest of Osiris Wenennefer and his wife Tiy.
Yuyu	Ramesses II, Merneptah?	19th Dynasty	Son of the High Priest of Osiris Wenennefer and his wife Tiy. Brother of Hori.
Siese	Merneptah	19th Dynasty	Son of the High Priest of Osiris Yuyu
Hori II	Ramesses III	20th Dynasty	
