= Khonsu (TT31) =

Aa1 n sw w called N17 Z1 N21
Khonsu called To
in hieroglyphs
Era: New Kingdom
(1550–1069 BC)

Khonsu called To who was First Prophet of Menkheperre (Thutmose III), during the reign of Ramesses II in the 19th Dynasty

== Family ==
Khonsu was the son of the High Priest of Amenhotep II Neferhotep and Tawosret. Khonsu had several brothers and sisters including the High Priests of Thutmosis I Nay and Iuy.

Khonsu is attested with two wives in his tomb TT31. His first wife Ruia was the mother of the High Priest of Sobek Usermontu and other children. His second wife May was mother to the Stablemaster Usermontu and the Second Prophet of Menkheperre Khaemwaset and others.

== Career ==
Khonsu served as High Priest of Menkheperre (Thutmose III) and is depicted in his tomb overseeing the transport of a statue of the King. Depictions show a pylon at the Temple of Mencheperre at Armant. Khonsu is shown accompanying a statue of Thutmosis III as it travels up a canal from the Nile to the landing spot at the temple. The pylon depicted is thought to be the VIIth pylon at the Temple of Amun at Karnak.

Khonsu was also the High Priest of Montu at Tod, a location just south of Thebes.
