= Prehotep I =

Ancient Egyptian Vizier

- Vizier of the North
Egyptian name
G40 N5 Z1 Htp t p
- Successor: Prehotep II (Vizier)
- Dynasty: 19th Dynasty
- Pharaoh: Ramesses II
- Father: Mery, High Priest of Osiris
- Mother: Maianuy

The ancient Egyptian noble Prehotep I (also known as Rahotep, Parahotep, Prehotep the Elder, Parehotp) was Vizier in the latter part of the reign of Ramesses II, during the 19th Dynasty.

== Family ==
Parahotep is mentioned on two monuments belonging to the High Priest of Osiris Wennufer. On a statue now in the Athens Museum, the city governor and vizier Rahotep is said to be the (grand-)son of the High Priest of Osiris To and to be born of Maianuy. Wennufer also included his brother Prehotep in a family monument from Abydos. The vizier Nebamun is also said to be a brother of Wennufer and Prehotep. On another monument however Nebamun is said to be a son of Ramose and Sheritre, so he is more likely to be a cousin.

== Monuments ==
Prehotep is known from a stela in Abydos (Cairo Jde 19775) which depicts Prehotep with two other men and three women adoring Osiris and Isis. A canopic jar with Selqet and Qebehsenuef protecting Prehotep is now in Brussels (E. 5901).

Prehotep is mentioned on Wennufer's monuments as mentioned in the section about family above.

== Identity with vizier Prehotep II ==
- for the possible identity with a namesake, compare: Prehotep II (Vizier)
