= Tomb of Horemheb =

Tomb of Horemheb may refer to either of two tombs made for the Eighteenth Dynasty pharaoh Horemheb:

- Tomb of Horemheb in Saqqara, made before Horemheb became pharaoh
- KV57 in the Valley of the Kings, where Horemheb was buried
