= Paatenemheb =

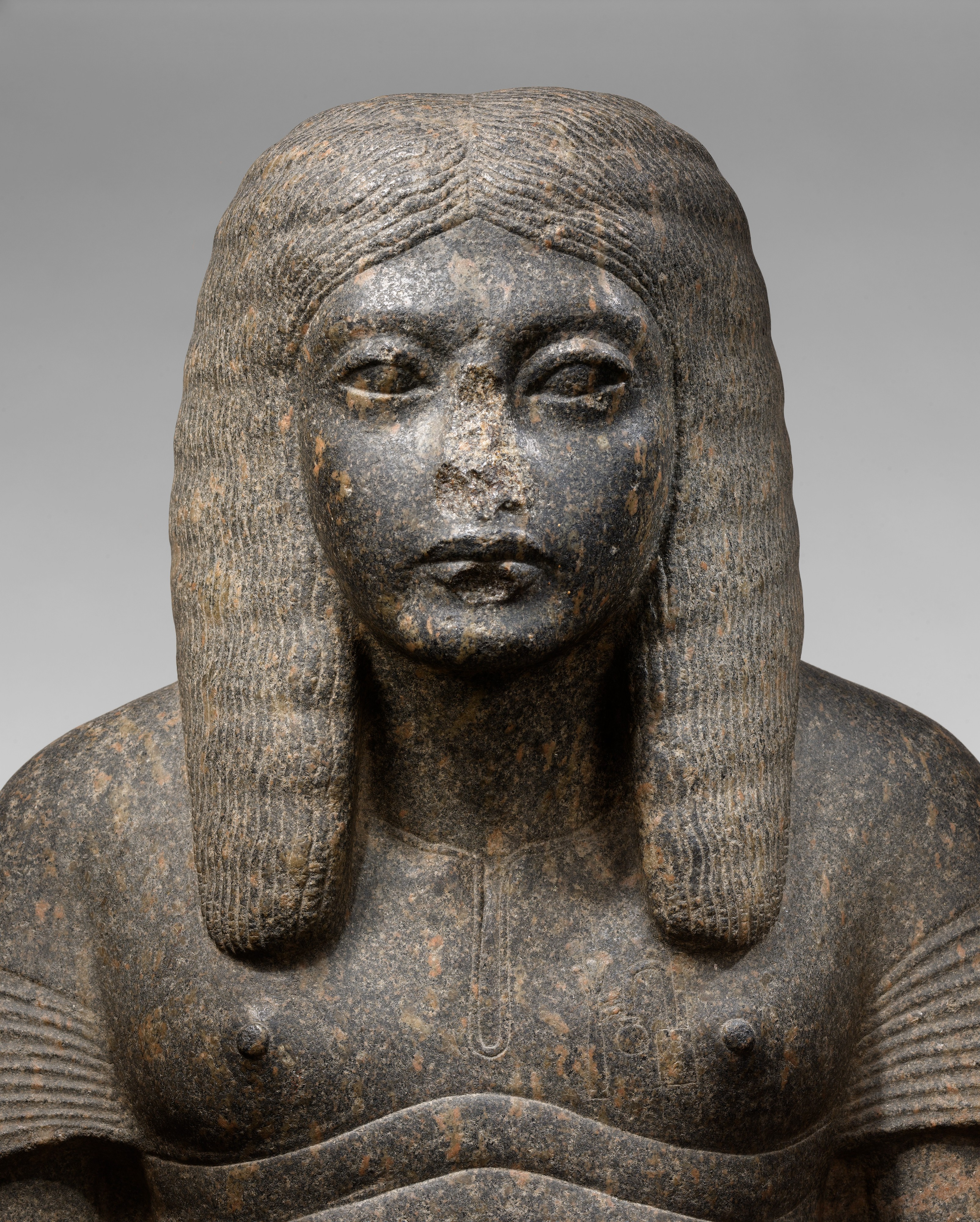
- Horemheb as a scribe. His identification with Paatenemheb is still matter of debate.
Native name
G40 i t n N5 Aa15 V28 D58 W3 A51Pȝ-jtn-m-ḥ-b
- Buried: Amarna Tomb 24
- Allegiance: 18th Dynasty of Egypt (Amenhotep III and Akhenaten)

Paatenemheb ("the Aten [is] in festival") was an ancient Egyptian official who served under pharaohs Amenhotep III and Akhenaten of the 18th Dynasty.

== Biography ==
Paatenemheb made his way into the ranks of the military to become commander-in-chief of Akhenaten’s army.

His tomb is among those of the nobles in Amarna (TA24). It was barely started, and even the descending stairs were roughly hewn. The few inscriptions from the entrance are no longer visible, but these were recorded at the time of the discovery and reported the titles he had in life: Royal Scribe, Overseer of the soldiery of the Lord of the Two Lands, Steward of the Lord of the Two Lands, and Overseer of porters in Akhetaten.

=== Identification with Horemheb ===
It is still uncertain if Paatenemheb was none other than pharaoh Horemheb in his early career — before adopting a name more appropriate to the post-Amarnan religious restoration — or if they were two separate individuals.

Such equation is seen as possible by Aidan Dodson and Dyan Hilton. Back in 1906 James Henry Breasted was open for the possibility, but thought it more likely that Paatenemheb was to be rather identified with the future High Priest of Ra Paraemheb instead. Toby Wilkinson even contemplates the chance that Paatenhemeb may have switched his name twice: born as Horemheb, changed to Paatenemheb during Akhenaten’s reign, and conveniently reverted to Horemheb after Akenaten’s death.
Conversely, Nicolas Grimal argued that the two apparently were two different persons.

== See also ==
- Tomb of Horemheb in Saqqara
