= Mutnedjmet =

- Queen consort of Egypt; Great Royal Wife chantress of Hathor
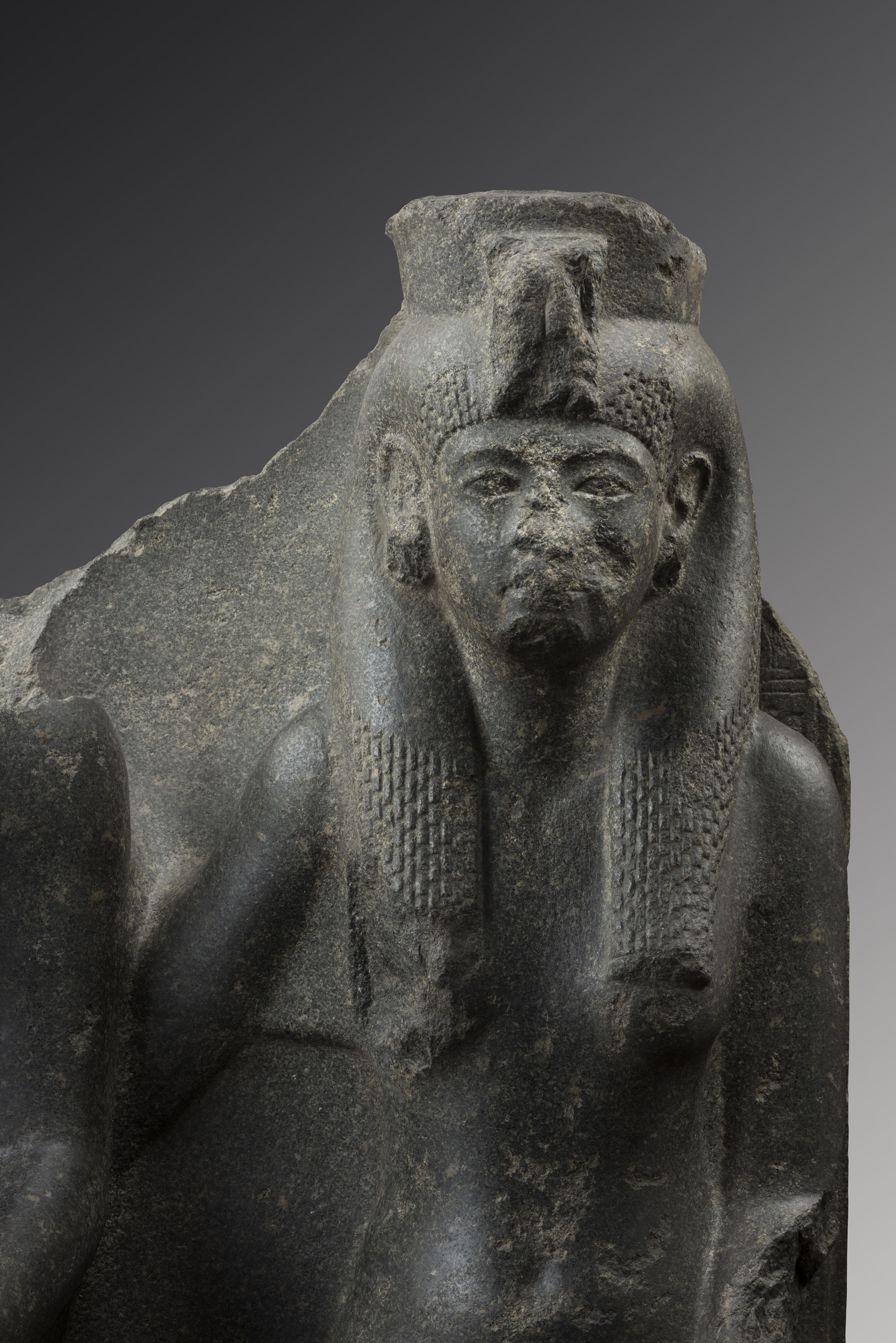
- Mutnedjmet, detail of the double statue of pharaoh Horemheb and queen Mutnedjmet, from Karnak, Museo Egizio, Turin, Italy
- Burial: Tomb of Horemheb in Saqqara
- Spouse: Pharaoh Horemheb
Egyptian name
G15 t M29 t Aa29 B1
- Dynasty: 18th Dynasty
- Father: possibly Ay
- Mother: possibly Tey
- Religion: Ancient Egyptian religion

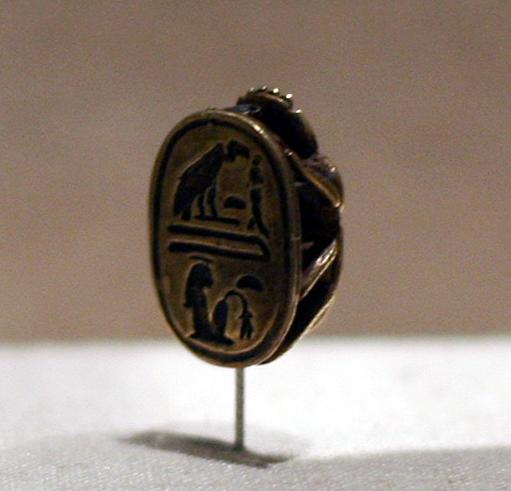
Scarab of Mutnodjmet. Brooklyn Museum, acc. no. 37.715E

Mutnedjmet, also spelled Mutnodjmet, Mutnedjemet, etc. (Ancient Egyptian: mw.t-nḏm.t), was an ancient Egyptian queen, the Great Royal Wife of Horemheb, the last ruler of the 18th Dynasty. The name, Mutnedjmet, translates as: "The sweet Mut" or "Mut is sweet." She was the second wife of Horemheb after Amenia who died before Horemheb became pharaoh.

== Titles ==
Mutnedjmet's titles include: Hereditary Princess (jryt-pʿt), Great King’s Wife (ḥmt-nswt-wrt), Great of Praises (wrt-ḥswt), Lady of Charm (nbt-jmʒt), Sweet of Love (bnrt-mrwt), Mistress of Upper and Lower Egypt (ḥnwt-šmʿw -mḥw), Songstress of Hathor (ḥsyt-nt-ḥwt-ḥrw), and Songstress of Amun (smʿyt-nt-jmnw). (Note: Great Wife of the King, Lady od Two Lands, Mutnodjme beloved of Isis mother of the god may she live eternally)

== Mutnedjmet as Nefertiti's sister ==
Some Egyptologists have speculated that Mutnedjmet is identical to Nefertiti's sister Mutbenret/Mutnodjmet, the reading of whose name is disputed. As noted by Ian Mladjov, there is ambiguity in use of the "nedjem" (nḏm) and "bener" (bnr) signs in the name of Queen Tanodjmy, which is certainly to be read this way, with a phonetic complement confirming this reading, "nedjem," for what is otherwise the "bener" sign. Consequently, the supposed difference between the names ostensibly written Mutnedjmet and Mutbenret is insufficient to establish different individuals in itself: whether or not Nefertiti's sister and Horemheb's queen are one and the same individual, the name is likely to be the same.

Whether or not the names are the same, the identity of the two persons cannot be proved one way or the other. As Geoffrey Martin writes,

The name Mutnodjmet was not particularly rare in the late Eighteenth Dynasty, and even if she were the sister of Nefertiti her marriage to Horemheb would have had no effect on Horemheb's legitimacy or candidacy since Mutnodjmet (who is depicted in the private tombs at El-Amarna) was not herself of royal blood. In any case whatever her antecedents Mutnodjmet could have been married to Horemheb a little before he became Pharaoh.

On the other hand, many Egyptologists like Aidan Dodson consider Nefertiti to have become the female king (i.e., queen regnant) Neferneferuaten, in which case, if Horemheb's wife Mutnedjemet was Nefertiti's sister, she would have linked her husband more closely with a former monarch. Moreover, it is possible that Nefertiti and her sister Mutbenret/Mutnodjmet, were daughters of the future king Ay, Horemheb's immediate predecessor, which would have made Horemheb succeed his father-in-law. The scarcity of the evidence precludes certainty on these points.

== Monuments and inscriptions ==
Mutnedjmet is known from several objects and inscriptions:

- A double statue of Horemheb and Mutnedjmet was found in Karnak, but is now in the Museo Egizio in Turin (1379). On Mutnedjmet's side of the throne she is depicted as a winged sphinx who adores her own cartouche. As a sphinx she is depicted wearing a flat topped crown topped with plant elements associated with the goddess Tefnut. The back of the statue records Horemheb's rise to power.
- Horemheb and Mutnodjemet are depicted in the tomb of Roy (TT255) in Dra Abu el-Naga. The royal couple are shown in an offering scene.
- One of the colossal statues in Karnak (north side of the 10th pylon) was made for Horemheb and depicted Mutnedjmet. The statue was later usurped and reinscribed for Ramesses II and Nefertari.
- Mutnedjmet usurped several inscriptions of Ankhesenamun in Luxor.
- Statues (fragments) and other items including alabaster fragments naming Mutnodjemet were found in Horemheb's Saqqara tomb. Some items bear funerary texts.

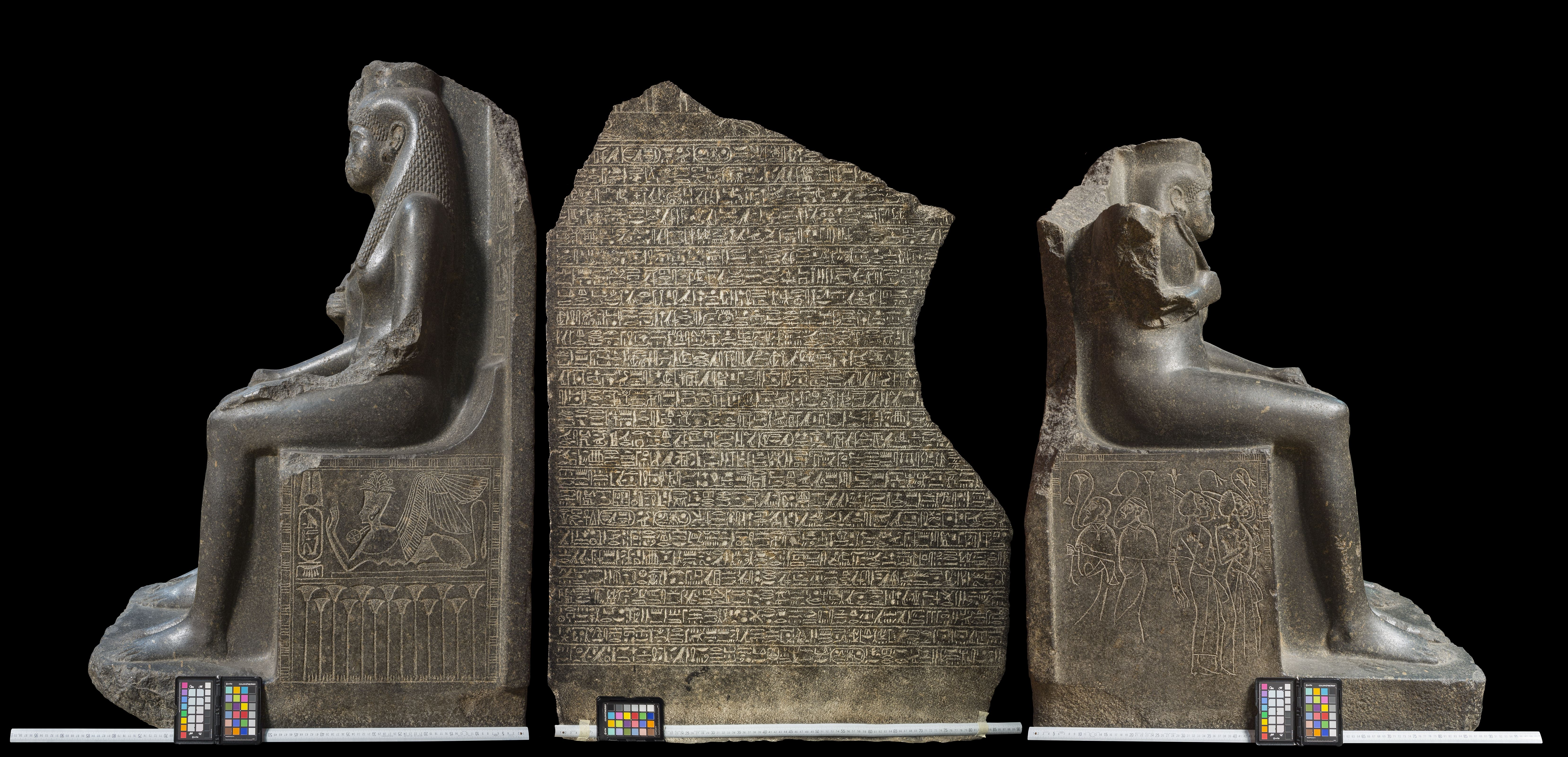
Sides of the double statue of pharaoh Horemheb and queen Mutnedjemet, from Karnak, Museo Egizio, Turin.

== Death and burial ==
Mutnedjmet died soon after Year 13 of her husband's rule in her mid-40s based on a wine-jar docket found in a burial chamber of Horemheb tomb at Saqqara, in Memphis and a statue and other items of hers found here. The badly damaged remains of her probable mummy was found in Horemheb's unused Memphite tomb along with the bones of unborn or newborn child. She appears to have been buried in the Memphite tomb of Horemheb, alongside his first wife Amenia. Mutnedjmet's mummy shows she had given birth several times, but the last King of the 18th Dynasty did not have a living heir at the time of his death. It has been suggested that she at least had a daughter who was simply not mentioned on any monuments. The presence of the fetus/infant along with Mutnedjmet in the tomb suggests that this queen died during pregnancy or in childbirth. A canopic jar of the Queen is now located in the British Museum.

Tomb QV33 in the Valley of the Queens, where Queen Tanodjmy, a wife of Seti I was buried, was suggested as a tomb of Mutnedjemet, due to a misreading of the cartouches with the queen's name. This erroneous suggestion has been abandoned.

== In popular culture ==
- The South African artist Winifred Brunton painted a portrait of this queen during the 1920s.
- In Michelle Moran's novel, Nefertiti: A Novel, Mutnedjmet is the principal character as the younger sister of Queen Nefertiti.
