= Jacobus Van Dijk =

Dutch Egyptologist

Jacobus van Dijk (born 1953) is a Dutch Egyptologist, epigrapher, and philologist of the ancient Egyptian language, who was an associate professor of Egyptology at the University of Groningen, The Netherlands. When the university of Groningen decided to discontinue the subject, Professor Van Dijik took early retirement and is now a Professor Emeritus of Egyptology from this university in the Netherlands. Following a brief period at Leiden University, he now works as an independent scholar. Van Dijk studied Egyptology in Groningen with Prof. Herman te Velde, with subsidiary courses in Semitic Languages (especially Ugaritic) and History of Religions, and also followed courses in Ptolemaic and Demotic at Leiden University. He graduated with a BA degree in 1975, followed by an MA with a thesis on The Canaanite god Hauron and his cult in Egypt (1978). In 1993, he gained his PhD with The New Kingdom Necropolis of Memphis: Historical and Iconographical Studies. His research mainly focuses on the history and culture of the late 18th and early 19th Dynasties, but he also wrote on the temple of the goddess Mut and on human sacrifice in Ancient Egypt.

== Career ==
Van Dijk excavated in several sites in Egypt, working as epigrapher/philologist with the joint expedition of the Egypt Exploration Society, London and the National Museum of Antiquities, Leiden to The New Kingdom Necropolis at Saqqara directed by Geoffrey Martin, which excavated, among others, the Memphite tombs of Horemheb, Maya, and Tia (1981–2003). In 1986, he also joined the Brooklyn Museum Expedition to the Precinct of Mut at South Karnak directed by Richard Fazzini, with which he is still working today.

In 1986, Geoffrey Thorndike Martin the field director of a combined British and Dutch eight person archaeological team that included Jacobus Van Dijk rediscovered the tomb of Maya, Tutankhamun's treasurer, after a 10-year search at Saqqara. Maya's tomb at Saqqara had been partly discovered in the 19th century and the statues of Maya and his wife Merit were removed from the tomb and acquired by the Rijksmuseum van Oudheden in Leiden in 1826. Karl Richard Lepsius later re-excavated Maya's tomb in 1843 and its impressive reliefs were recorded in line drawings and taken to Berlin. Over time, the tomb was covered by sand, and its location had been lost.

In 2001, The New York Times reported that "a limestone relief depicting the head of an Egyptian goddess and dating to the 13th century B.C. was returned to the Egyptian government yesterday by the Metropolitan Museum of Art from New York due to the intervention of Jacobus Van Dijk:

"who recognized it as a piece from the chapel of Seti I, at the ancient pharaonic capital of Memphis. Upon returning home, he confirmed his hunch by checking a French publication where the same goddess's head was featured in a photograph of the Seti I chapel, taken around 1948, the year the site was discovered by archaeologists."

Between 2006 and 2009, Van Dijk and Geoffrey Martin joined forces again in a project to re-excavate the royal tomb of pharaoh Horemheb in the Valley of the Kings (KV57), which produced new evidence on the length of Horemheb’s reign, a hotly debated issue in Egyptian chronology. During the 2006–2008 excavation seasons, they found 168 wine dockets in the tomb which showed that Horemheb, who was the last Dynasty 18 king and assumed the throne within 3 or 4 years after Tutankhamun's death, ruled not more than 14 or 15 years rather than the 27 or 28 years traditionally assigned to him since none of the wine dockets bore a date higher than Year 14 of Horemheb's reign.

In 2011, Jacobus Van Dijk established that Seti I's highest date was not the Year 11 stela date from the Great Temple of Amun, Gebel Barkal in Nubia. He demonstrated that the date should rather be read as Year 3 of Seti I. Van Dijk argued that Seti I's reign was 8 or a maximum of 9 years. In his 2009 paper "The Death of Meketaten", Van Dijk contributed an article regarding the death of Akhenaten's daughter, Meketaten, in honor of the late William J. Murnane in a book which was published by Brill Publishers. Van Dijk wrote in his article's conclusion "....that the scene in Room alpha in the royal tomb at Amarna showing a nurse carrying a newborn baby out of the chamber in which princess Meketaten has just died is a symbolic representation of her death and rebirth and that neither this scene nor its parallel in Room gamma have anything to do with the actual birth of a royal child, let alone that of Tutankhaten [i.e. Tutankhamun]”, as has often been suggested.

== Publications ==
A full bibliography (with PDF) of his publications can be found either on this article's Talkpage or on Van Dijk's Homepage website. Dr Julia Harvey (1962–2019), Van Dijk's wife, was also an Egyptologist. The late Dutch Egyptologist (1932–2019), Herman te Velde, was a colleague of Dr. Van Dijk from the same University of Groningen as this professor.
