= Horemheb =

Final Pharaoh of the 18th dynasty of Egypt

- Horemhab, Haremhab, Haremheb
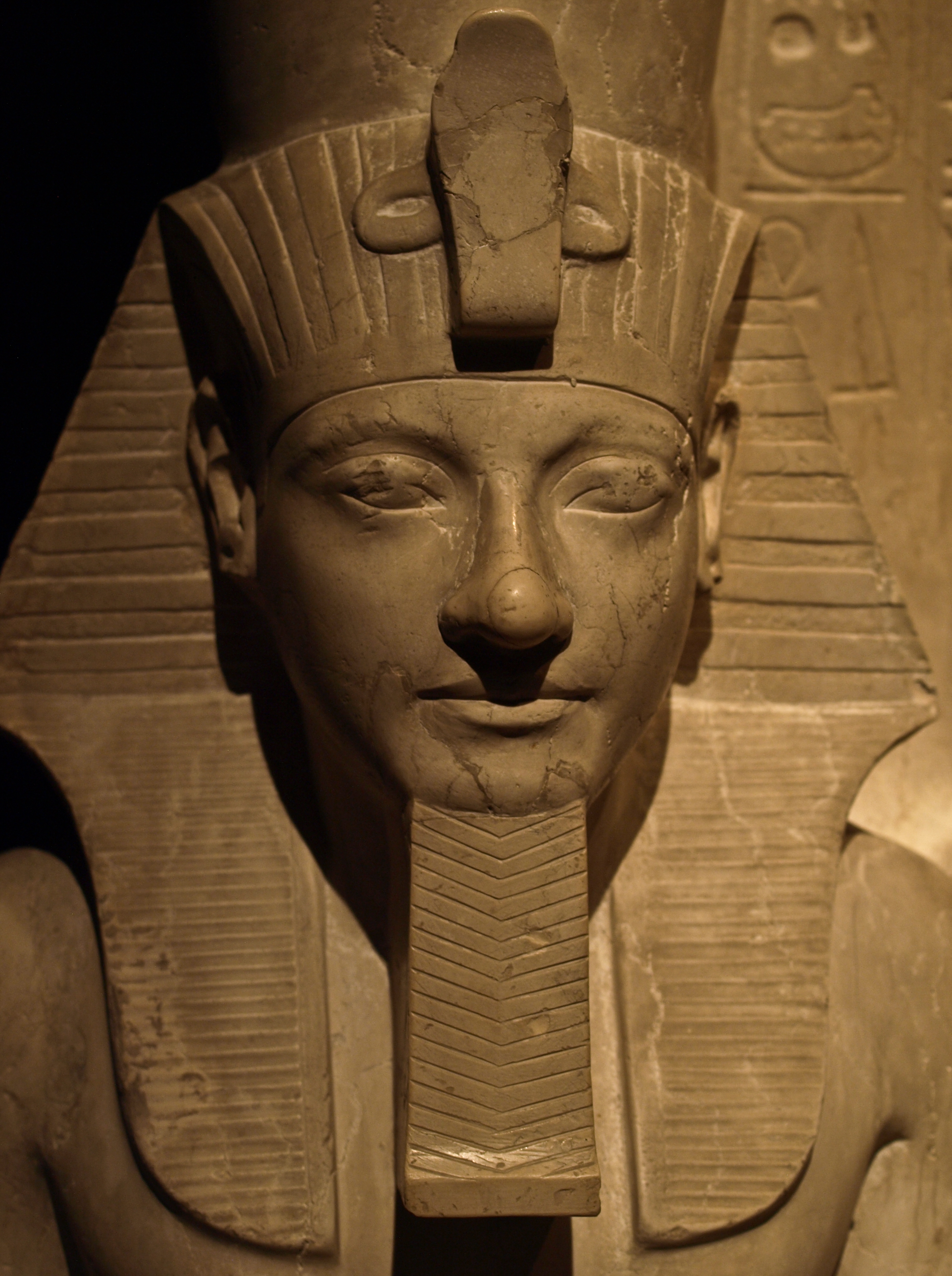
- Detail of a statue of Horemheb, at the Kunsthistorisches Museum, Vienna

Pharaoh
- Reign: 27 regnal years (disputed); 1319–1292 BC (low chr.)
- Predecessor: Ay
- Successor: Ramesses I
Royal titulary
Horus name
Kanakht Sepedkheru
K3-nḫt-Spd-ḫrw
Strong bull, whose plans are effective
G5	E2 D40 M44 G43 G13 S29 P8 Z7
Nebty name
Werbiawet-em-Ipetsut
Wr-bj3wt-m-Jptswt
He who is great of miracles in Ipetsut
G16	G36 D21 U16 X1 Z2 G17 M17 Q3 X1 Q1 Q1 Q1
Golden Horus
Heruhermaat Sekhepertawy
Ḥrw-ḥr-m3ˁ.t-sḫpr-t3wj
He who is satisfied with the Maat, he who makes the two lands come to existence
G8	O4 D21 Y1 D2 Z1 C10 S29 L1 N17 N17
Prenomen
Djeserkheperure Setepenre
Ḏsr-ḫprw-Rˁ-stp-n-Rˁ
Holy are the manifestations of Ra, the chosen one of Ra
M23 t L2 t < ra Dsr xpr Z2 ra stp n >
Nomen
Horemheb Meryamun
Ḥr-m-ḥb-mrj-Jmn
Horus is in jubilation, beloved of Amun

G39 N5	M17 Y5 N35 U6 G5 S3 Aa15 W3
- Consorts: Amenia, Mutnedjmet
- Children: Possibly Isitnofret; Possibly Tanodjmy
- Died: 1292 BC
- Burial: KV57
- Monuments: Memphite Tomb; Mortuary Temple
- Dynasty: 18th Dynasty

Horemheb, also spelled Horemhab, Haremheb or Haremhab (Ancient Egyptian: ḥr-m-ḥb, meaning "Horus is in Jubilation"), was the last pharaoh of the 18th Dynasty of Egypt (1550–1292 BC). He ruled for at least 14 years between 1319 BC and 1292 BC. He had no relation to the preceding royal family other than by marriage to Mutnedjmet, (Note: Great Wife of the King, Lady of Two Lands, Mutnodjme beloved of Isis mother of the god, may she live eternally) who is thought (though disputed) to have been the daughter of his predecessor, Ay; he is believed to have been of common birth.

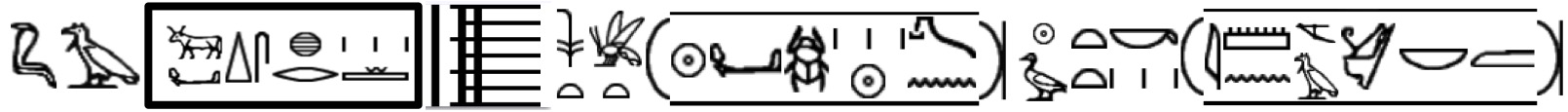
Before he became pharaoh Horemheb was the commander-in-chief of the army (Note: The princ, The King's right hand the commander-in-chief Horemheb) under the reigns of Tutankhamun and Ay. After his accession to the throne adopted the official title "Mighty Bull, Ready in Plans Favorite of the Two Goddesses, King of Upper and Lower Egypt." (Note: Dyeserjeperura-Setepenra Horemheb-Meryamón) He reformed the Egyptian state and it was during his reign that official action against the preceding Amarna rulers began, which is why he is considered the ruler who restabilized his country after the troublesome and divisive Amarna Period.

Horemheb demolished monuments of Akhenaten, reusing the rubble in his own building projects, and usurped monuments of Tutankhamun and Ay. Horemheb presumably had no surviving sons, as he appointed as his successor his vizier Paramessu, who would assume the throne as Ramesses I.

As pharaoh, Horemheb authored the Edict of Horemheb, a criminological legislative document instituting policies for reducing corruption.

== Early career ==
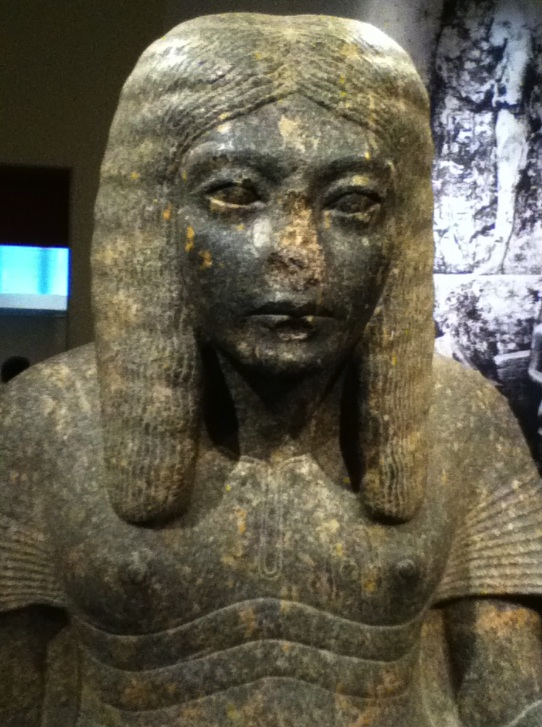
A statue of Horemheb as a scribe

Horemheb is believed to have originally come from Hnes, (Note: Hnes is the city's ancient Egyptian name; it was later called Heracleopolis Magna by classical authors; its modern name is Ihnasya el-Medina.) on the west bank of the Nile, near the entrance to the Faiyum, since his coronation text formally credits the god Horus of Hnes for establishing him on the throne.

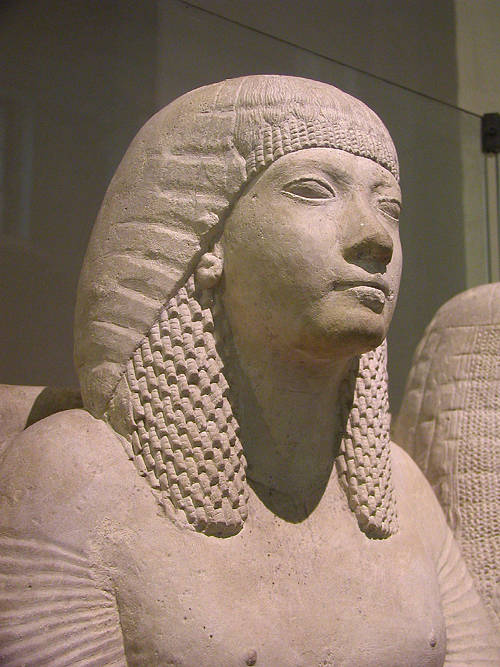
A statue of Horemheb as an official, at the British Museum of London, the UK.

His parentage is unknown but he is believed to have been a commoner. According to the French Egyptologist Nicolas Grimal, Horemheb does not appear to be the same person as Paatenemheb (Aten Is Present In Jubilation), who was the commander-in-chief of Akhenaten's army. Grimal notes that Horemheb's political career began under Tutankhamun where he "is depicted at this king's side in his own tomb chapel at Memphis."

He is known to have served in the military during the reign of Akhenaten. In the earliest known stage of his life Horemheb served as "the royal spokesman for [Egypt's] foreign affairs" and personally led a diplomatic mission to visit the Nubian governors. This resulted in a reciprocal visit by "the Prince of Miam (Aniba)" to Tutankhamun's court, "an event [that is] depicted in the tomb of the Viceroy Huy." Horemheb quickly rose to prominence under Tutankhamun, becoming commander-in-chief of the army and advisor to the pharaoh. Horemheb's specific titles are spelled out in his Saqqara tomb, which was built while he was still only an official: "Hereditary Prince, Fan-bearer on the Right Side of the King and Chief Commander of the Army"; the "attendant of the King in his footsteps in the foreign countries of the south and the north"; the "King's Messenger in front of his army to the foreign countries to the south and the north"; and the "Sole Companion, he who is by the feet of his lord on the battlefield on that day of killing Asiatics."

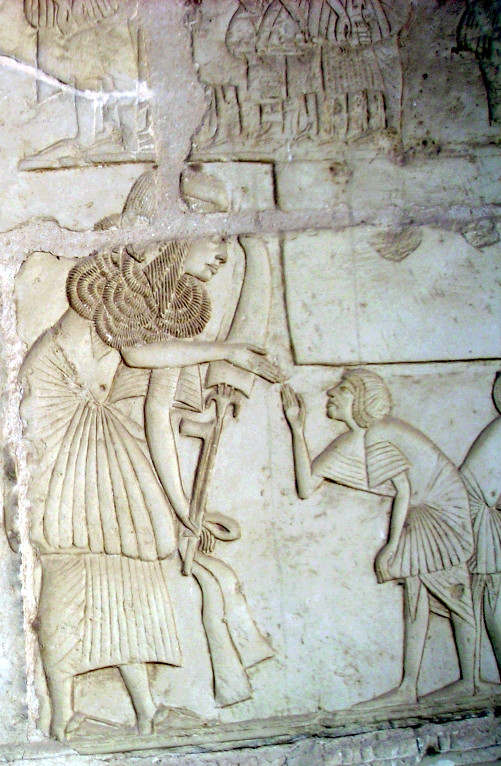
Relief from Horemheb's tomb in Saqqara. Receiving 'gold of honour' collars.

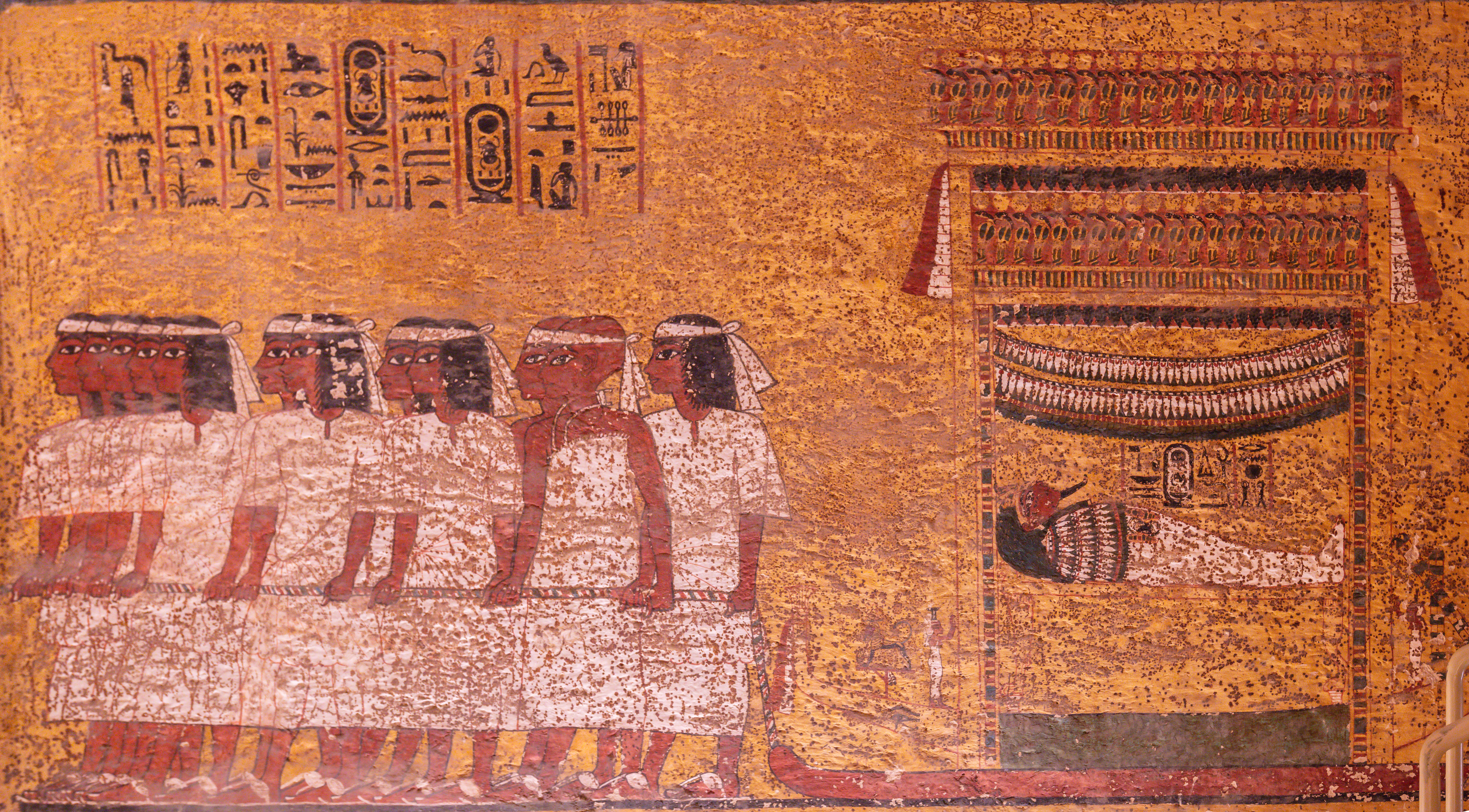
Mural from KV62 showing court officials dragging Tutankhamun's coffin. Horemheb is possibly the person closest to Tutankhamun's mummy.

== Accession ==
When Tutankhamun died while a teenager, Horemheb had already been officially designated as the rpat or iry-pat (often translated hereditary or crown prince) and idnw (deputy of the king in the entire land) by the young pharaoh; these titles are found inscribed in Horemheb's then private Memphite tomb at Saqqara, which dates to the reign of Tutankhamun since the young king's

... cartouches, although later usurped by Horemheb as king, have been found on a block which adjoins the famous gold of honour scene, a large portion of which is in Leiden. The royal couple depicted in this scene and in the adjacent scene 76, which shows Horemheb acting as an intermediary between the king and a group of subject foreign rulers, are therefore to be identified as Tut'ankhamun and 'Ankhesenamun. This makes it very unlikely from the start that any titles of honours claimed by Horemheb in the inscriptions in the tomb are fictitious.

The title iry-pat (Hereditary Prince) was used very frequently in Horemheb's Saqqara tomb but not combined with any other words. When used alone, the Egyptologist Alan Gardiner has shown that the iry-pat title contains features of ancient descent and lawful inheritance which is identical to the designation for a "Crown Prince." This has been taken to mean that Horemheb was the openly recognised heir to Tutankhamun's throne, and not Ay, Tutankhamun's immediate successor. On the other hand, more recent assessment of the titulary has translated iry-pat as "Executive" and attaches a less specific and exceptional importance to the title. The Dutch Egyptologist Jacobus Van Dijk observes:

There is no indication that Horemheb always intended to succeed Tut'ankhamun; obviously not even he could possibly have predicted that the king would die without issue. It must always have been understood that his appointment as crown prince would end as soon as the king produced an heir, and that he would succeed Tut'ankhamun only in the eventuality of an early and / or childless death of the sovereign. There can be no doubt that nobody outranked the Hereditary Prince of Upper and Lower Egypt and Deputy of the King in the Entire Land except the king himself, and that Horemheb was entitled to the throne once the king had unexpectedly died without issue. This means that it is Ay's, not Horemheb's, accession that calls for an explanation. Why was Ay able to ascend the throne upon the death of Tut'ankhamun, despite the fact that Horemheb had at that time already been the official heir to the throne for almost ten years?

Nozomu Kawai, however, rejects Van Dijk's interpretation that Tutankhamun had nominated Horemheb as his successor and reasons that:

"If Horemheb was appointed as the "Crown Prince" at the beginning of Tutankhamun’s reign, this means that the end of the royal bloodline was already arranged. If this arrangement was made, people like Ay, who were closely connected to the royal family, would not have accepted it. Although Horemheb had already boasted of his strength in his pre-royal career, the statements must have been exaggerated, especially in his [ie. Horemheb's] coronation inscription, which was undoubtedly intended to propagate his legitimacy as the king. Notably, he called himself the ‘Eldest son of Horus’, a title that regularly refers to the Crown Prince. For van Dijk this means that he was already the designated successor of Tutankhamun. Janssen, however, states that the "Eldest Son" was honorific and did not indicate the surviving heir to the throne. I would suggest that this expression seems to have been a propaganda title meaning the "Eldest son of Horus of Hutnesu," Horemheb’s birthplace."

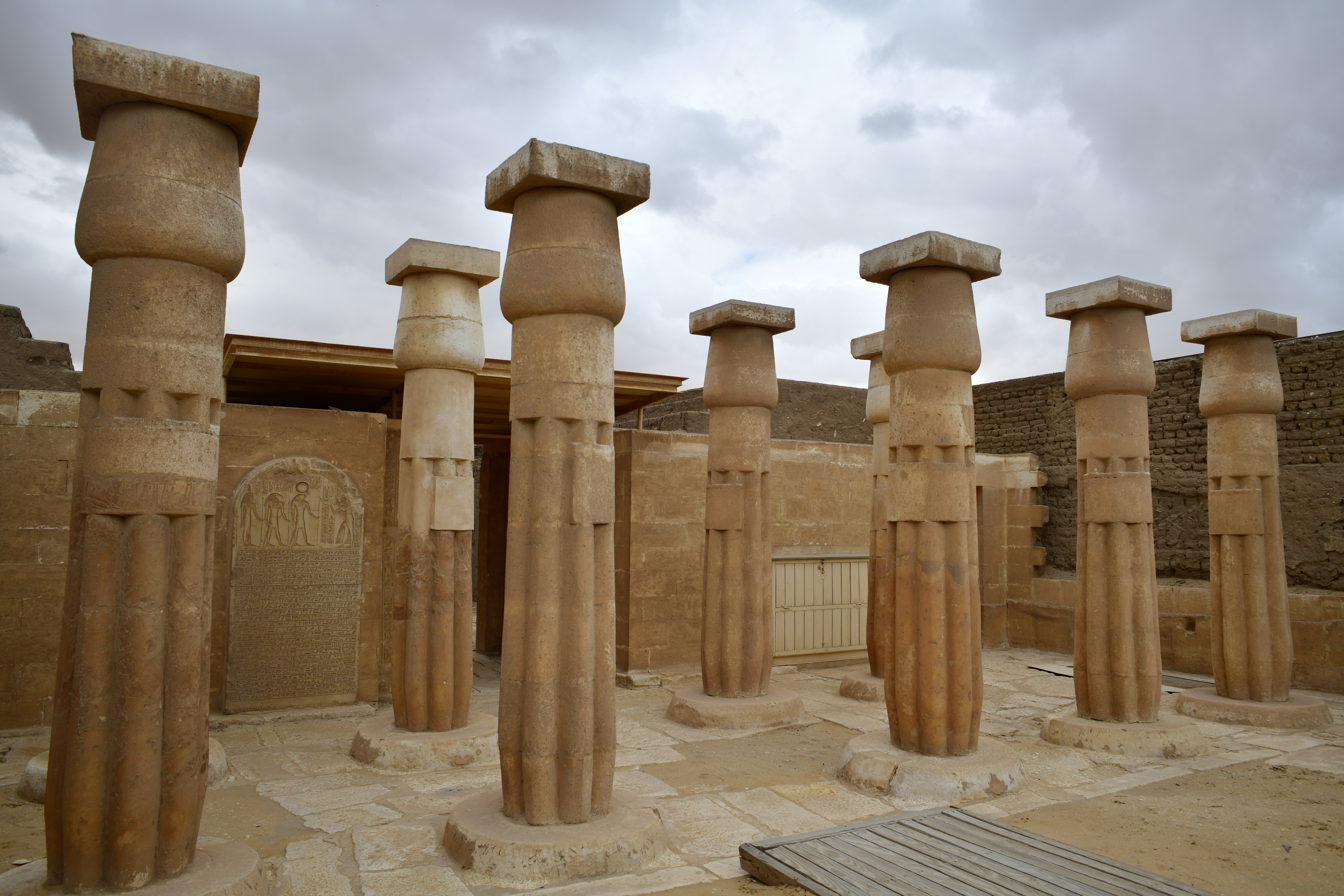
The forecourt of Horemheb's Memphite tomb at Saqqara.

While no objects belonging to Horemheb were found in Tutankhamun's tomb, and items among the tomb goods donated by other high-ranking officials, such as Maya and General Nakhtmin, were identified by Egyptologists. Nozomu Kawai maintains that Horemheb was an active participant at Tutankhamun's burial. Kawai writes:

"Many scholars have suggested that Horemheb did not leave any evidence in Tutankhamun’s tomb, while prominent persons such as Ay, Maya and Nakhtmin left either funerary items or iconographic images. However, the wall scene of the tomb shows Tutankhmun’s coffin dragged by a group of officials in a mourning procession that contains a man who seems to be Horemheb (Fig. 3). The lone figure standing behind the two viziers must be Horemheb, which also makes him situated closest to the mummy of Tutankhamun. This means that Horemheb acted as the leader of the funerary procession."

Kawai maintains rather that both Ay and Horemheb held important high administrative roles during Tutankhamun's reign with Ay participating in royal cultic activities whereas Horemheb acted as a royal military leader and legislator. But after Ay became the pharaoh, his relationship with Horemheb changed. The aged Vizier Ay initially succeeded Tutankhamun, possibly because he made an arrangement with Horemheb. However, during his brief four-year reign, Ay proceeded to nominate Nakhtmin as his successor—whom Ay named as "King's Son" (zꜣ-nswt)—rather than Horemheb. The title of "King’s Son" (zꜣ-nswt) was clearly meant to designate the king's successor and Ay, therefore, sidelined Horemheb's claim to the throne with this action. Ankhesenamun, Tutankhamun's queen chose not to marry Horemheb, a commoner, and this also solidified Ay's kingship.

== Reign ==
Kawai notes that Horemheb himself likely "did not plot revenge on Ay, probably because Ay was old and would likely die soon" and merely kept his military power. After Ay's reign, which lasted for a little over four years, Horemheb managed to seize power, presumably thanks to his position as commander of the army, and to assume what he must have perceived to be his reward for having ably served Egypt under Tutankhamun and Ay. Horemheb resented Ay's attempt to sideline him from the royal succession and acted to quickly removed Nakhtmin's rival claim to the throne and arranged to have Ay's WV 23 tomb desecrated by smashing the latter's sarcophagus, systematically chiseling Ay's name and figure out of the tomb walls and probably destroying Ay's mummy. Horemheb also usurped and enlarged Ay's mortuary temple at Medinet Habu for his own use and usurped a 17-foot colossal statue by erasing Ay's titulary on the back of the state, which itself had been written over the titulary of Tutankhamun, and carving his own titulary in its place.

Horemheb's actions against Ay were a damnatio memoriae to remove the memory of his rival from the historical records. However, he spared Tutankhamun's tomb from vandalism presumably out of respect because it was Tutankhamun who had overseen his rise to prominence in the first place and because he had no antagonism with Tutankhamun.

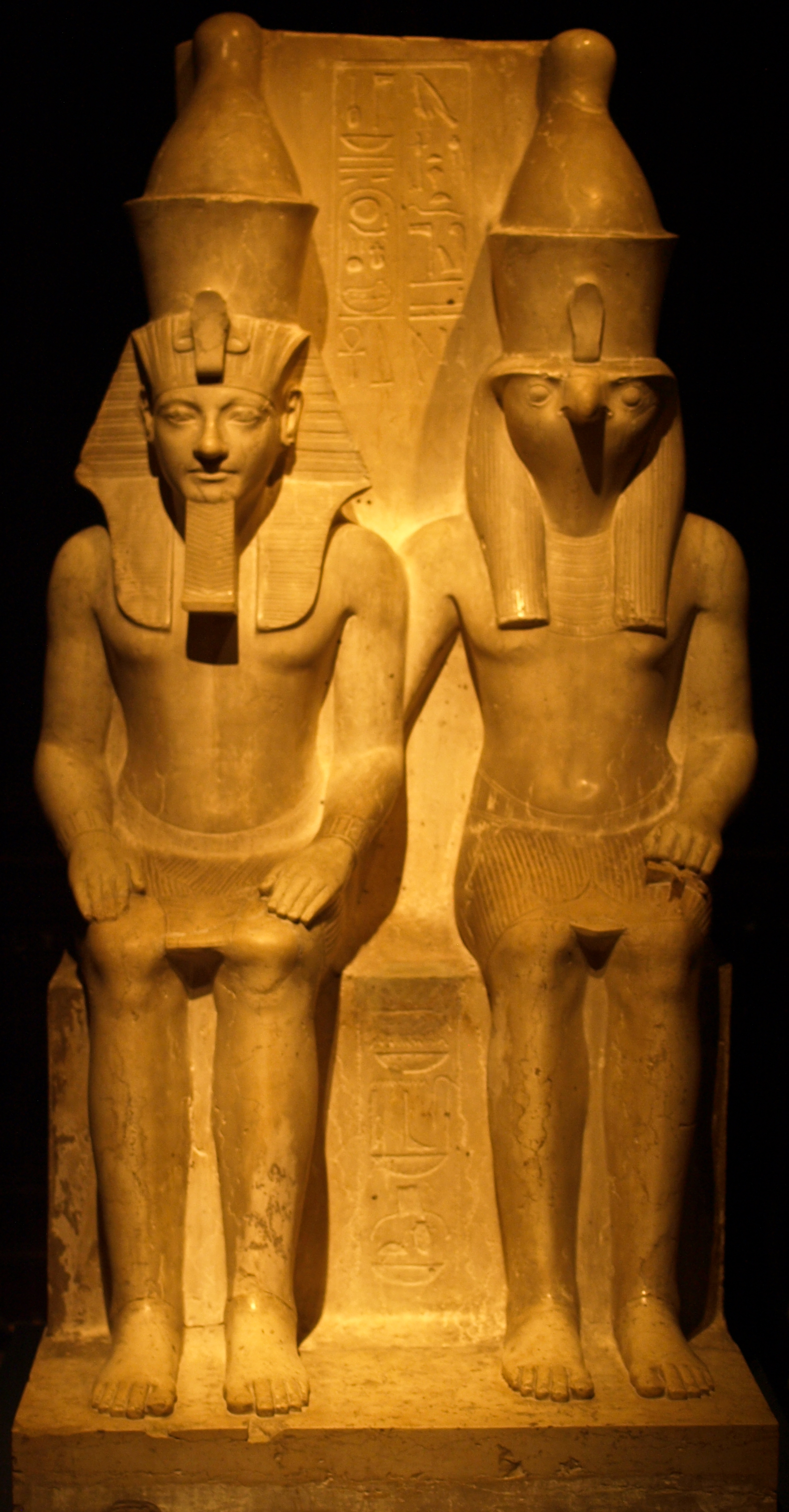
A statue of Horemheb with Horus at the Kunsthistorisches Museum of Vienna, Austria.

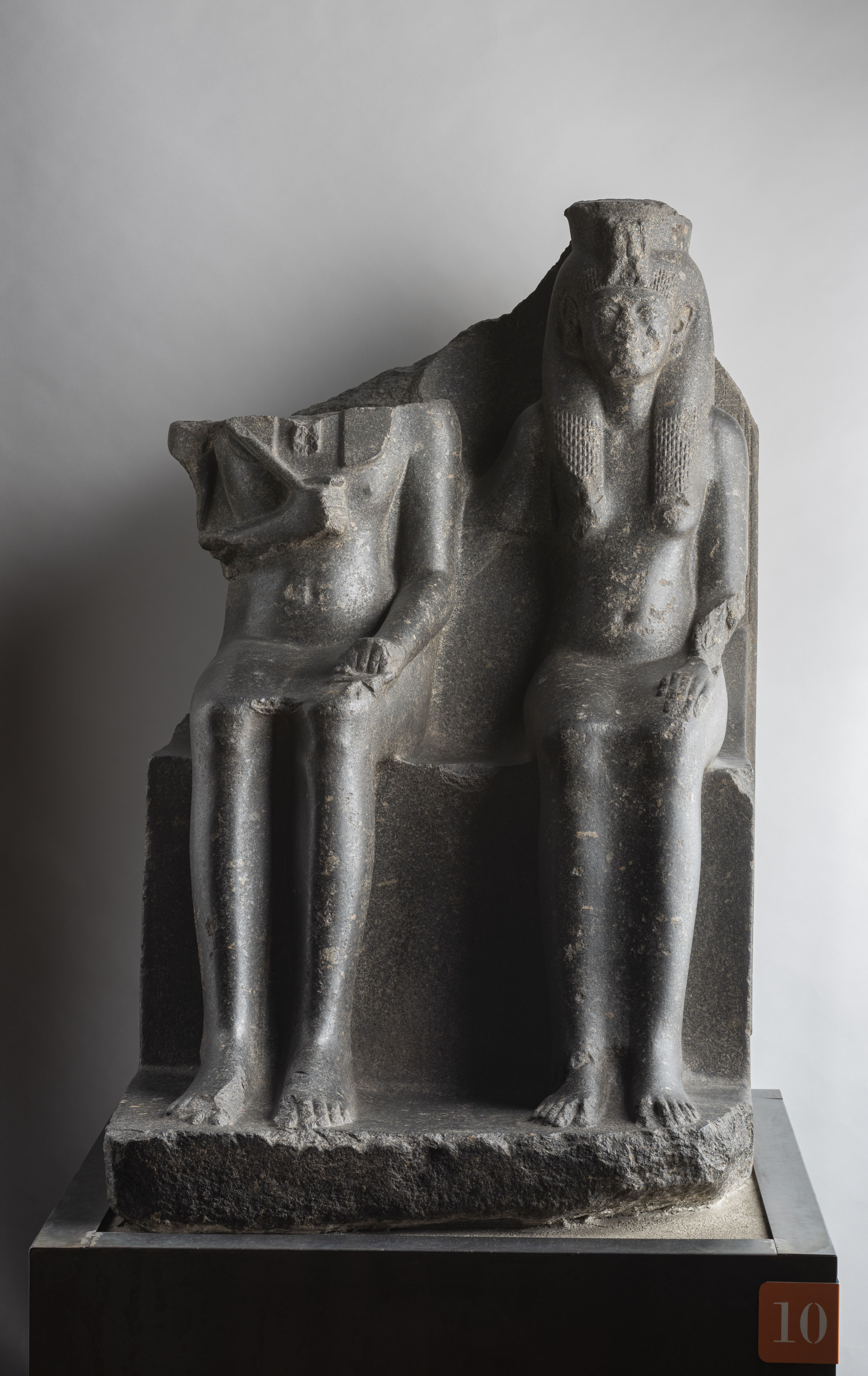
King Horemheb with queen Mutnedjemet statues

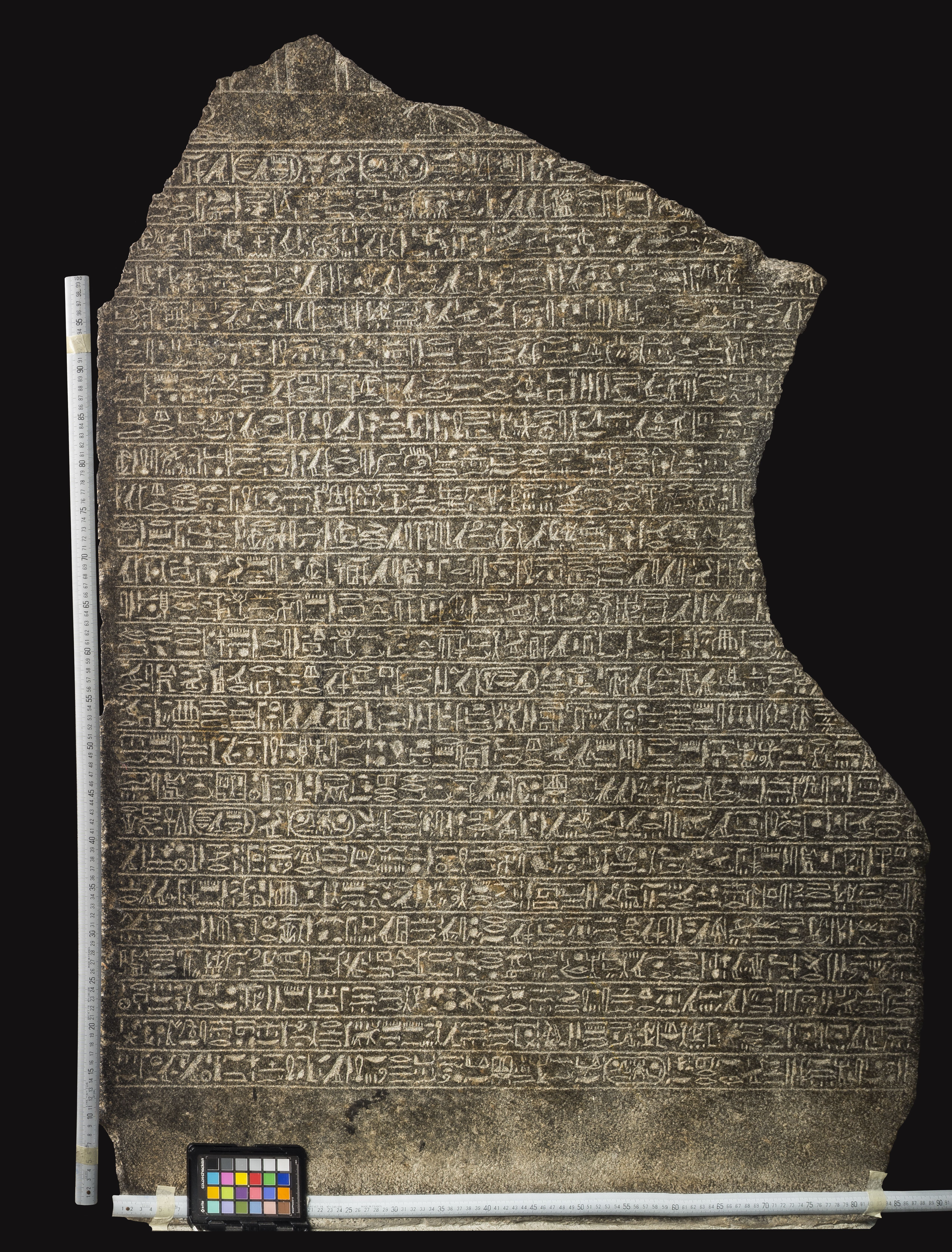
The Heremheb coronation script on the back site of the statue, who was general of Tutankhamun before ascending the throne

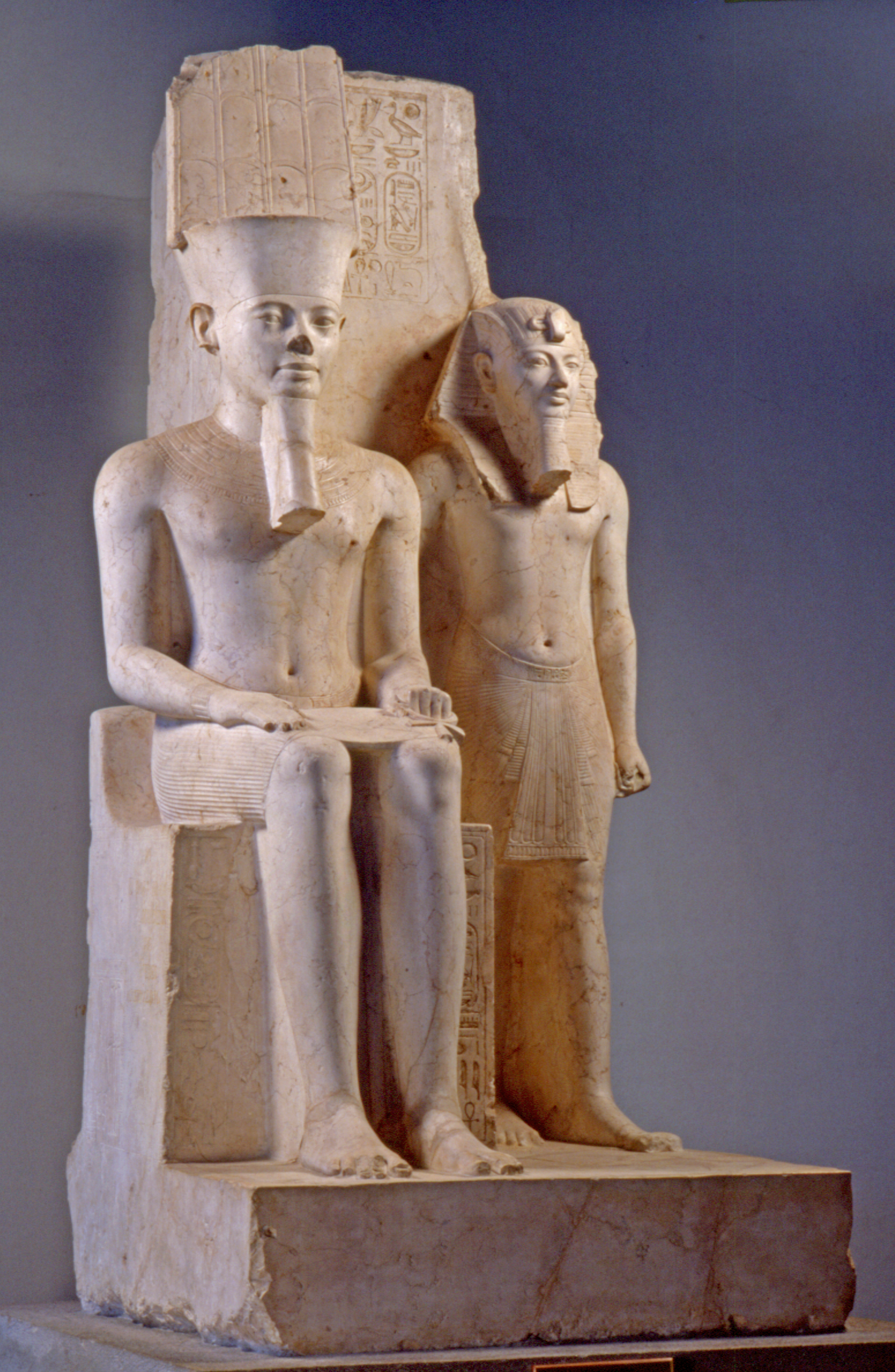
A statue of Horemheb with Amun at the Museo Egizio of Turin, Italy.

Upon his accession, Horemheb initiated a comprehensive series of internal transformations to the power structures of Akhenaten's reign, due to the preceding transfer of state power from Amun's priests to Akhenaten's government officials. Horemheb "appointed judges and regional tribunes reintroduced local religious authorities" and divided legal power "between Upper Egypt and Lower Egypt" between "the Viziers of Thebes and Memphis respectively."

These deeds are recorded in a stela which the king erected at the foot of his Tenth Pylon at Karnak. (Note: The Edict of Horemheb inscription was discovered near the 10th pylon at the Karnak Temple Complex in Egypt by Egyptologist Gaston Maspero. The date of discovery was around February or March during 1882. The artifact was discovered in damaged condition, and approximately one third of the text is missing) Occasionally called The Great Edict of Horemheb, it is a copy of the actual text of the king's decree to re-establish order to the Two Lands and curb abuses of state authority. The stela's coronation and prominent location emphasizes the great importance which Horemheb placed upon domestic reform. When Haremheb ascended the throne after the death of Ay II, he consolidated his rule by centralizing the state and continuing to establish a court in Thebes, where he could supervise the powerful and scheming priests there. He had his successful reforms inscribed on the tenth pylon in the temple complex in nearby Karnak. The text can be interpreted as a “government code”, defined by the direct will of this ruler. It contains a number of general regulations laws addressed not only to the common people, but also deals with the organization of the army, the bureaucracy or the organization of foreign expeditions and military conquests. The code also contains provisions concerning agriculture and, last but not least, it touches on the position of the powerful priests and temple servants, whom he appoints as employees of the state by virtue of his royal power. (Note: The weakening of central power towards the end of the reign of Amenhotep III, the disproportionate increase in the wealth of priestly centers, and the rivalry of Thebes with the revered god Amon and Hheliopolis with the main god Re Harakhtey, were among the main causes of the development of the Amarna period and the chaos after the death of Akhenaten) At the end of the text, Haremheb defines himself as the only legitimate ruler.

Horemheb also reformed the Army and reorganized the Deir el-Medina workforce in his 7th year while Horemheb's official Maya renewed the tomb of Thutmose IV, which had been disturbed by tomb robbers in his 8th year. While the king restored the priesthood of Amun, he prevented the Amun priests from forming a stranglehold on power, by deliberately reappointing priests who mostly came from the Egyptian army since he could rely on their personal loyalty. Horemheb was a prolific builder who erected numerous temples and buildings throughout Egypt during his reign. He constructed the Second, Ninth, and Tenth Pylons of the Great Hypostyle Hall, in the Temple at Karnak, using recycled talatat blocks from Akhenaten's own monuments here, as building material for the first two Pylons.

Horemheb continued Tutankhamun's restoration of the old order that had been established before the Amarna period. He reintroduced the ancient cults, particularly Amun, thus proving himself a true pharaoh who established Maat (world order).

Because of his unexpected rise to the throne, Horemheb had two tombs constructed for himself: the first – when he was a mere nobleman – at Saqqara near Memphis, and the other in the Valley of the Kings, in Thebes, in tomb KV 57 as king. His chief wife was Queen Mutnedjmet, who may have been Nefertiti's younger sister. They had no surviving children, although examinations of Mutnedjmet's mummy show that she gave birth several times, and she was buried with an infant, suggesting that she and her last child died in childbirth. It has been suggested that Horemheb and Mutnedjmet at least had a daughter who was simply not mentioned on any monuments. Horemheb is not known to have any children by his first wife, Amenia, who died before Horemheb assumed power.

=== Reign length ===
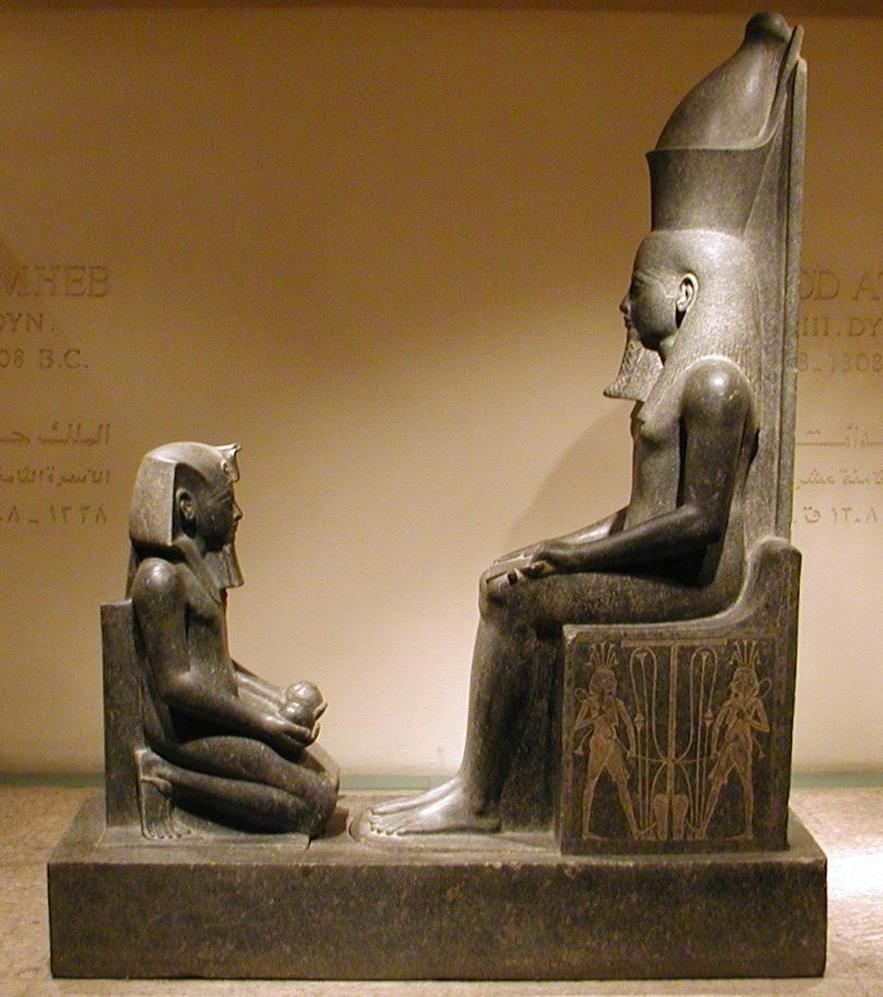
Horemheb making offerings to Atum, Luxor Museum.

Scholars have long disputed whether Horemheb reigned for 14–15 years or 27 years. Manetho's Epitome assigns a reign length of 4 years and 1 month to a king called Harmais. Scholars previously assigned this reign-length to Ay; however, evidence from excavations in Horemheb's tomb (KV57) indicates that this figure should be raised by a decade to [1]4 years and 1 month and attributed to Horemheb. These excavations, conducted under G.T. Martin and Jacobus Van Dijk in 2006 and 2007, uncovered a large hoard of 168 inscribed wine sherds and dockets, below densely compacted debris in a great shaft (called Well Room E) in KV 57. Of the 46 wine sherds with year dates, 14 have nothing but the year date formula, 5 dockets have year 10+X, 3 dockets have year 11+X, 2 dockets preserve year 12+X and 1 docket has a year 13+X inscription. 22 dockets "mention year 13 and 8 have year 14 [of Horemheb]" but none mention a higher date for Horemheb.

The full texts of the docket readings are identical and read as:

Year 13. Wine of the estate of Horemheb-meren-Amun, L.P.H., in the domain of Amun. Western River. Chief vintner Ty.

Meanwhile, the year 14 dockets, in contrast, are all individual and mention specific wines such as "very good quality wine" or, in one case "sweet wine" and the location of the vineyard is identified. A general example is this text on a year 14 wine docket:

Year 14, Good quality wine of the estate of Horemheb-meren-Amun, L.P.H., in the domain of Amun, from the wineyard of Atfih, Chief vintner Haty.

Other year 14 dockets mention Memphis (?), the Western River while their vintners are named as Nakhtamun, [Mer-]seger-men, Ramose, and others.

The "quality and consistency of the KV 57 dockets strongly suggest that Horemheb was buried in his year 14, or at least before the wine harvest of his year 15 at the very latest." This evidence is consistent "with the Horemheb dockets from Deir el-Medina which mention years 2, 3, 4, 6, 13, and 14, but again no higher dates ..." while a docket ascribed to Horemheb from Sedment has year 12." (Note: van Dijk (2008) cites Nagel (1938), for year 2; Koenig (1979–1980) for year 3 (no. 6299), year 4 (no. 6295), year 6 (no. 6403), year 13 (no. 6294), and year 14 (no. 6345); Martin (1988)) The lack of dated inscriptions for Horemheb after his year 14 also explains the unfinished state of Horemheb's royal KV 57 tomb – "a fact not taken into account by any of those [scholars] defending a long reign [of 26 or 27 years]. The tomb is comparable to that of Seti I in size and decoration technique, and Seti I's tomb is far more extensively decorated than that of Horemheb, and yet Seti managed to virtually complete his tomb within a decade, whereas Horemheb did not even succeed in fully decorating the three rooms he planned to have done, leaving even the burial hall unfinished. Even if we assume that Horemheb did not begin the work on his royal tomb until his year 7 or 8, ... it remains a mystery how the work could not have been completed had he lived on for another 20 or more years." Therefore, some scholars now accept a reign of 14 years and 1 month.

In 1995, prior to the 2006 and 2007 discovery of wine dockets from Horemheb's tomb, Van Dijk in a 1995 GM article already argued, based on the career of Maya's chief sculptor, Userhat Hatiay, that Horemheb far shorter reign of between 15 and 17 years.

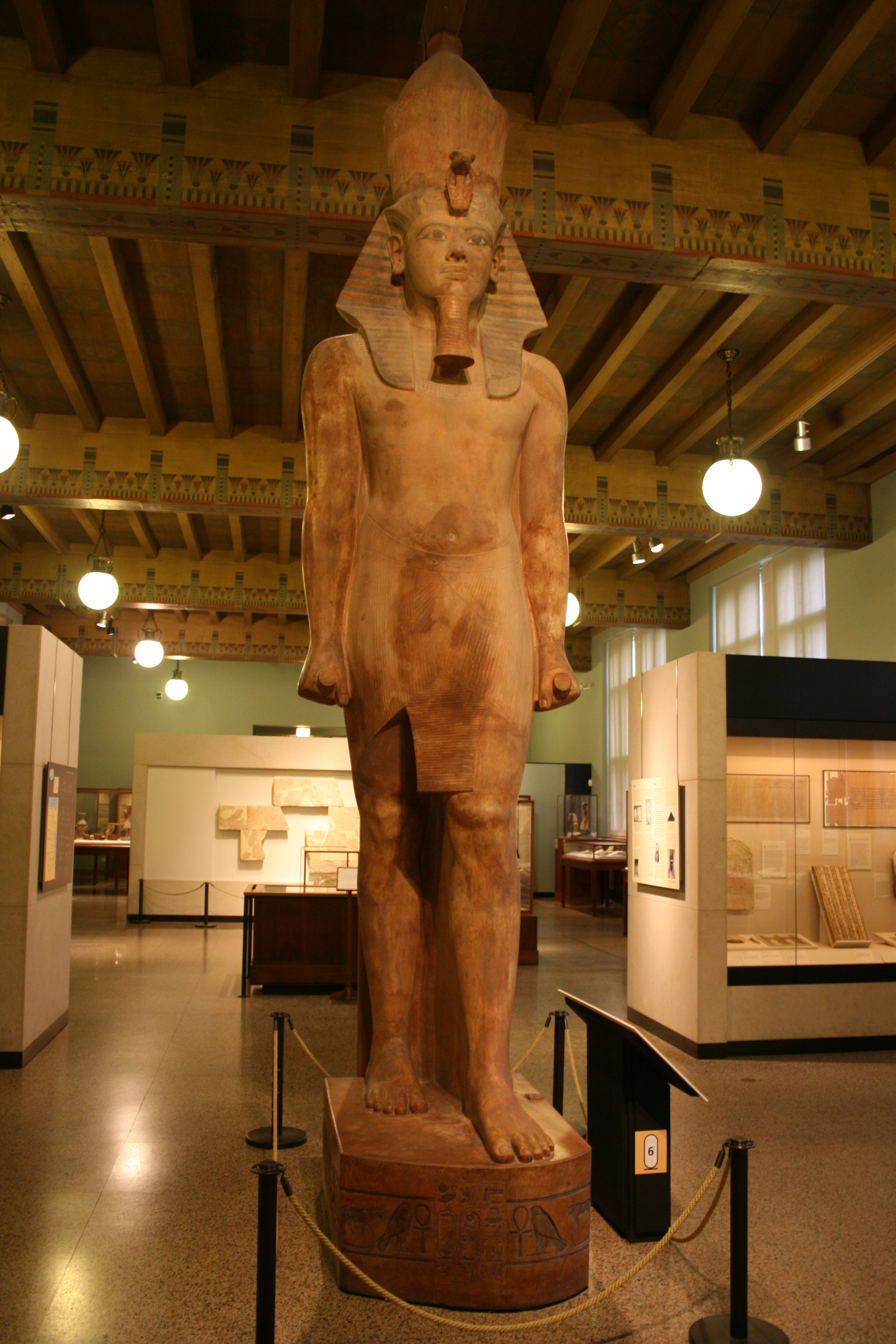
Colossal Quartzite statue usurped to represent Horemheb excavated from the ruins of the Ay and Horemheb temple in the 1930s, now on display in the Institute for the Study of Ancient Cultures. Traces of previous cartouches on the statue confirm that the statue originally represented Tutankhamun, which the later pharaohs are thought to have repurposed for the temple.

The argument for a 27-year reign derived from two texts. The first is an anonymous hieratic graffito written on the shoulder of a now fragmented statue from his mortuary temple in Karnak which mentions the appearance of the king himself, or a royal cult statue representing the king, for a religious feast. The ink graffito reads Year 27, first Month of Shemu day 9, the day on which Horemheb, who loves Amun and hates his enemies, entered [the temple for the event]. It was disputed whether this was a contemporary text or a reference to a festival commemorating Horemheb's accession written in the reign of a later king. The second text is the Inscription of Mes, from the reign of Ramesses II, which records that a court case decision was rendered in favour of a rival branch of Mes' family in year 59 of Horemheb. It was argued that the year 59 Horemheb date included the reigns of all the rulers between Amenhotep III and Horemheb. Subtracting the nearly 17-year reign of Akhenaten, the 2-year reign of Neferneferuaten, the 9-year reign of Tutankhamun and the reign of Ay suggested a reign of 26–27 years for Horemheb. However, the length of Ay's reign is not actually known and Wolfgang Helck argues that there was no standard Egyptian practice of including the years of all the rulers between Amenhotep III and Horemheb.

The more recent interpretation of the archeological evidence today favours Van Dijk's arguments that Horemheb either died in his Regnal Year 14 or that he started a Regnal Year 15 but died before the wine harvest of his final (15th) year was processed, and that later Rammasside pharaohs included the reigns of all the rulers between Amenhotep III and Horemheb to give him a total of at least 47 years. As David Aston notes in a 2012 Ägypten und Levante paper, this theory means that R. "Hari's [1964] emendation of the [partly damaged] Horemheb text London UC 14291 to Year [1]5 is possible but to year [2]5 is unlikely."

=== Year 16 ===
However, Van Dijk's arguments that Horemheb either died in his Regnal Year 14 or that he started a Regnal Year 15 but died before the wine harvesest of his final 15th year is now shown to be incorrect. Egyptologists have discovered a secure Year 16 date of Horemheb. Peter J. Brand, in his 2023 book, titled "Ramesses II: Egypt's Ultimate Pharaoh" by Lockwood Press notes that:

Recently fragments of another battle scene, from a temple Horemheb built at Thebes, have come to light. They depict him assaulting a Syria citadel. This time, a part of the hieroglyphic caption text identifies the enemy fortress as “the town His Person captured in the land of Ked—.” The end of the name is missing, but it is likely Kadesh, indicating that Horemheb reconquered the city. Another text dated to Horemheb’s sixteenth regnal year reports that his armies penetrated deep into Hittite-controlled territory as far north as Carchemish.

Horemheb's success, however, was shortlived since Kadesh soon after reverted back to Hittite rule. The Hittitologist Jared L. Miller established that Horemheb--called 'Arma'a in Hittite royal records--had actively campaigned against the Hittities in Year 7 and 9 of Mursilis II possibly even before Horemheb's own coronation as Egypt's king "in his role as viceroy and commander of Egypt's Asian territories, that is to say, before his reign as pharaoh." Horemheb may likely have continued these activities as king to conquer Kadesh and Carchemish in North Syria as pharaoh himself to regain lands lost under Akhenaten.

Peter Brand specifically notes in footnote 39 of his 2023 book that: "A granite bowl records Horemheb’s "first campaign of victory” against Carchemish in northern Syria in his sixteenth regnal year. Redford first described the piece in the early 1970s, but it soon vanished and most scholars long rejected it as a forgery. But [Nicholas] Grimal [a French Egyptologist] has now located and published the bowl, proving beyond all doubt that it is genuine: Redford 1973; Grimal 2018."

This conclusive evidence proves that Horemheb lived into his Year 16 and perhaps a few more years later...since he was still actively campaigning against the Hittites around this date. The fact that the authenticated granite bowl mentions only Horemheb's "first campaign of victory" inevitably suggests there was a second or third "victorious" campaign conducted against the Hittites by Horemheb--after his Year 16 for which no historical records have yet survived.

=== Cartouches and symbols ===
Horemheb turned to several gods because of his various names: his throne name, Djeserkheperure, means 'Sacred are the manifestations of Ra' and his name birth name is accompanied by the epithet Meryamun, which means 'beloved of Amun'.

It is not yet proven whether Horemheb had really exorcised the Amarna period, the great iconoclasm began only after his death. To be able to build for himself, however, he did have the Per-Aten temple at Karnak pulled down and constructed a pylon of the Amun temple with its stone blocks. The Aten reliefs from the Amarna period on those blocks therefore remained fairly well preserved.

Horemheb appear in reliefs wearing the typical pleated linen robe of a high-ranking official depicted sitting in front of an offering table, as a pharaoh holding the pole and the sekhem sceptre of a high official (the luraeus was added after his ascension to the throne), with a benu-bird regarded as the protector of the dead as the soul of Ra sitting on a stand, and finally a man worshipping a benu-bird.

The coronation inscription on the back of a double statue, showing Horemheb with his wife, tells that he is under the protection of Horus and appointed by Amun. It reports further that he had the damaged statues of the old gods remade and had the temples that had fallen into disrepair rebuilt. For the Amun cult, 'he provided them with servants to the god and lector priests from the military elite'. In a decree on a stele in Karnak, he again officially confirms the restoration of the old order.

== Succession ==
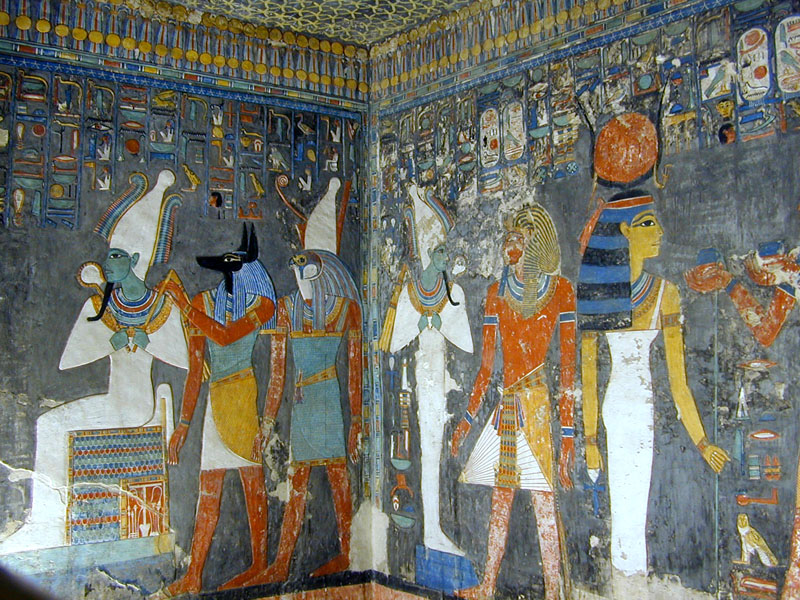
KV 57: the Tomb of Horemheb

Under Horemheb, Egypt's power and confidence were once again restored after the internal chaos of the Amarna Period; this situation set the stage for the rise of the 19th Dynasty under such ambitious Pharaohs as Seti I and Ramesses II. Geoffrey Thorndike Martin in his excavation work at Saqqara states that the burial of Horemheb's second wife Mutnedjmet, as well as that of an unborn or newborn baby, was located at the bottom of a shaft to the rooms of Horemheb's Saqqara tomb. He notes that "a fragment of an alabaster vase inscribed with a funerary text for the chantress of Amun and King's Wife, Mutnodjmet, as well as pieces of a statuette of her [was found here] ... The funerary vase in particular, since it bears her name and titles would hardly have been used for the burial of some other person."

Eugen Strouhal studied a skull and other bones and concluded that they belonged to the queen. According to Strouhal's analysis of her remains, the queen lost her teeth at an early age. She died at around age thirty-five to forty-five, possibly in childbirth, as the remains of a fetus were found with her body.

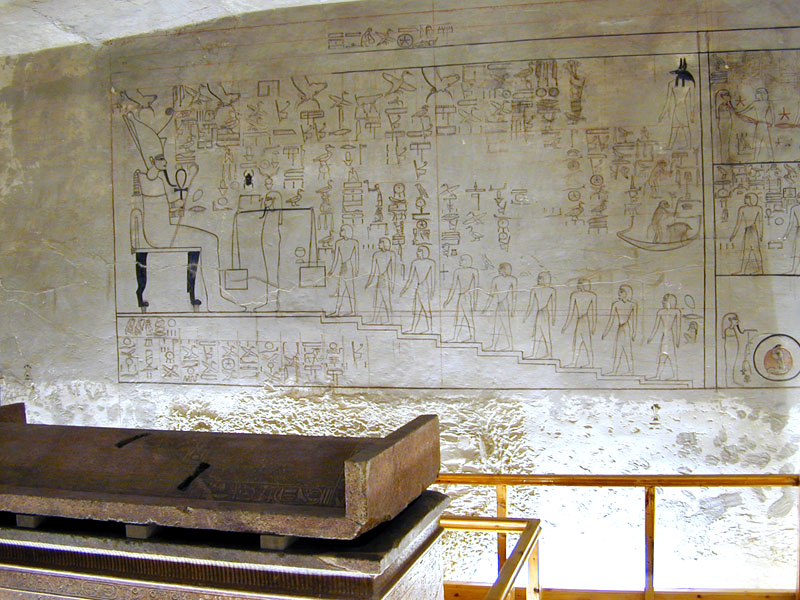
The sarcophagus of Horemheb and wall reliefs in his KV57 tomb.

Since Horemheb had no surviving son, he appointed his Vizier, Paramessu, to succeed him upon his death, both to reward Paramessu's loyalty and because the latter had both a son and grandson to secure Egypt's royal succession. Paramessu employed the name Ramesses I upon assuming power and founded the 19th Dynasty of the New Kingdom. Horemheb's second successor, Seti I, was married to a possible daughter of Horemheb's, Tanodjmy. While the decoration of Horemheb's KV 57 tomb was still unfinished upon his death, this situation is not unprecedented: Amenhotep II's tomb was also not fully completed when he was buried, even though this ruler enjoyed a reign of 26 years.

Although many of his monuments were later usurped by Seti I, Seti left the name of Horemheb on the veil of the Amun bark on a pedestal in Luxor temple untouched, likely out of respect. This is similar to how Horemheb left the name of Tutankhamun on the veil of Amun bark at Karnak temple untouched.

== Burial ==
Because of his unexpected rise to the throne, Horemheb had two tombs constructed for himself: the first – when he was a mere nobleman – at Saqqara near Memphis, and the other in the Valley of the Kings, in Thebes, in tomb KV 57 as king.

=== Tomb KV57 ===
The tomb KV57 was discovered 22 February 1908 by Edward R. Ayrton working for the American, Theodore Davis. The corridors are long, maintaining the trend of enlargement in their height and width and descend. The first pillared hall is much more square than before and the burial chamber is notable for a two pairs of pillars and the steps to the crypt with pink granite sarcophagus, which containing a skull and several bones, but in Davies's publication of the tomb no description is given of them, and no other mention than the brief note in the preface.

== Gallery ==
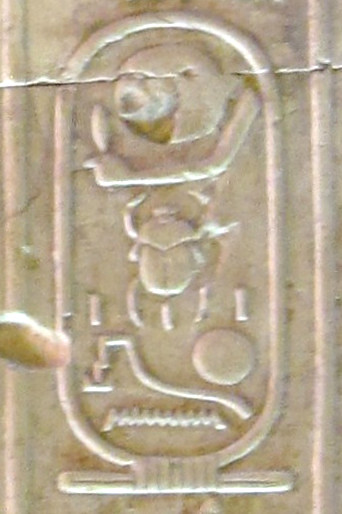
Cartouche of Horemheb on the Abydos King List.

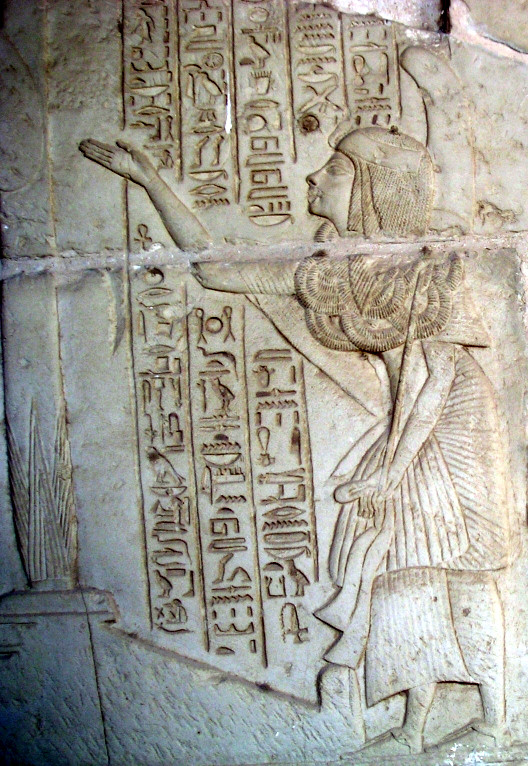
Relief of Horemheb's tomb in Saqqara

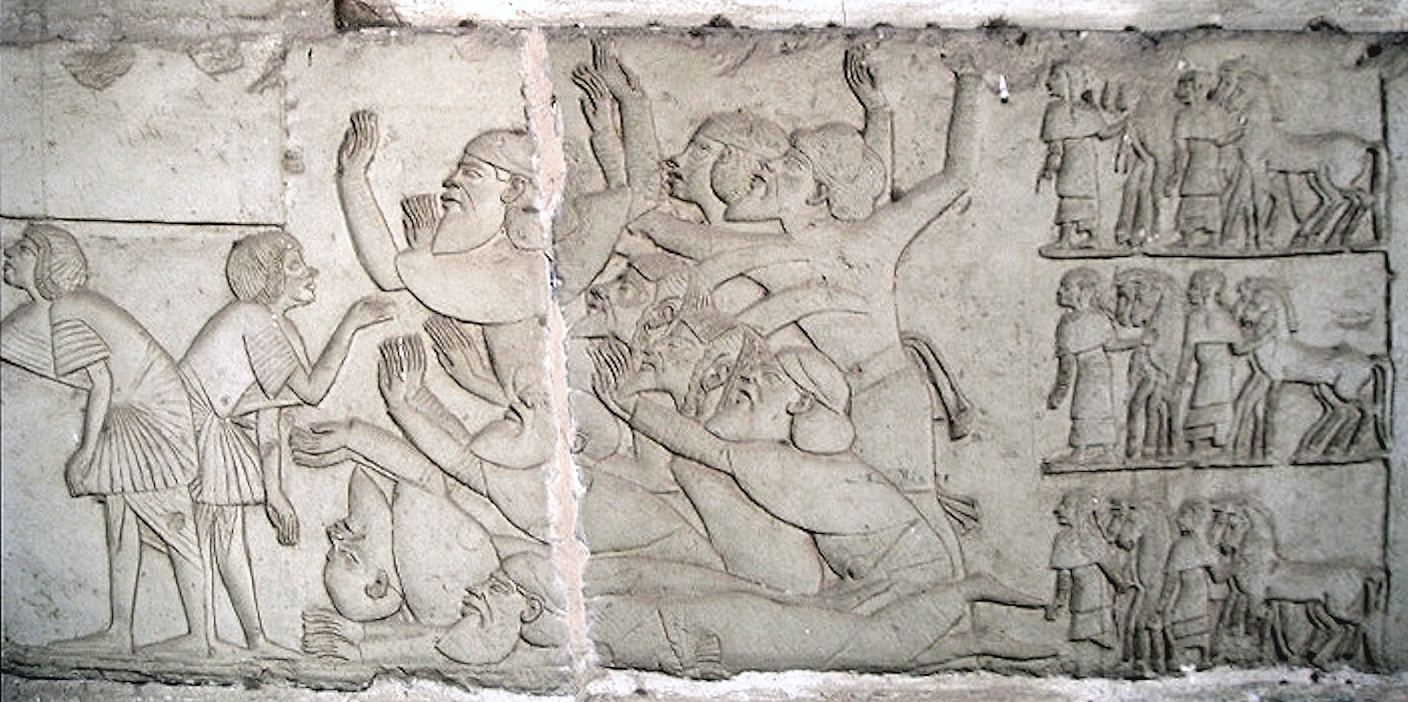
Submission of West Asiatic foreigners on the Saqqara tomb of Horemheb circa 1300 BC

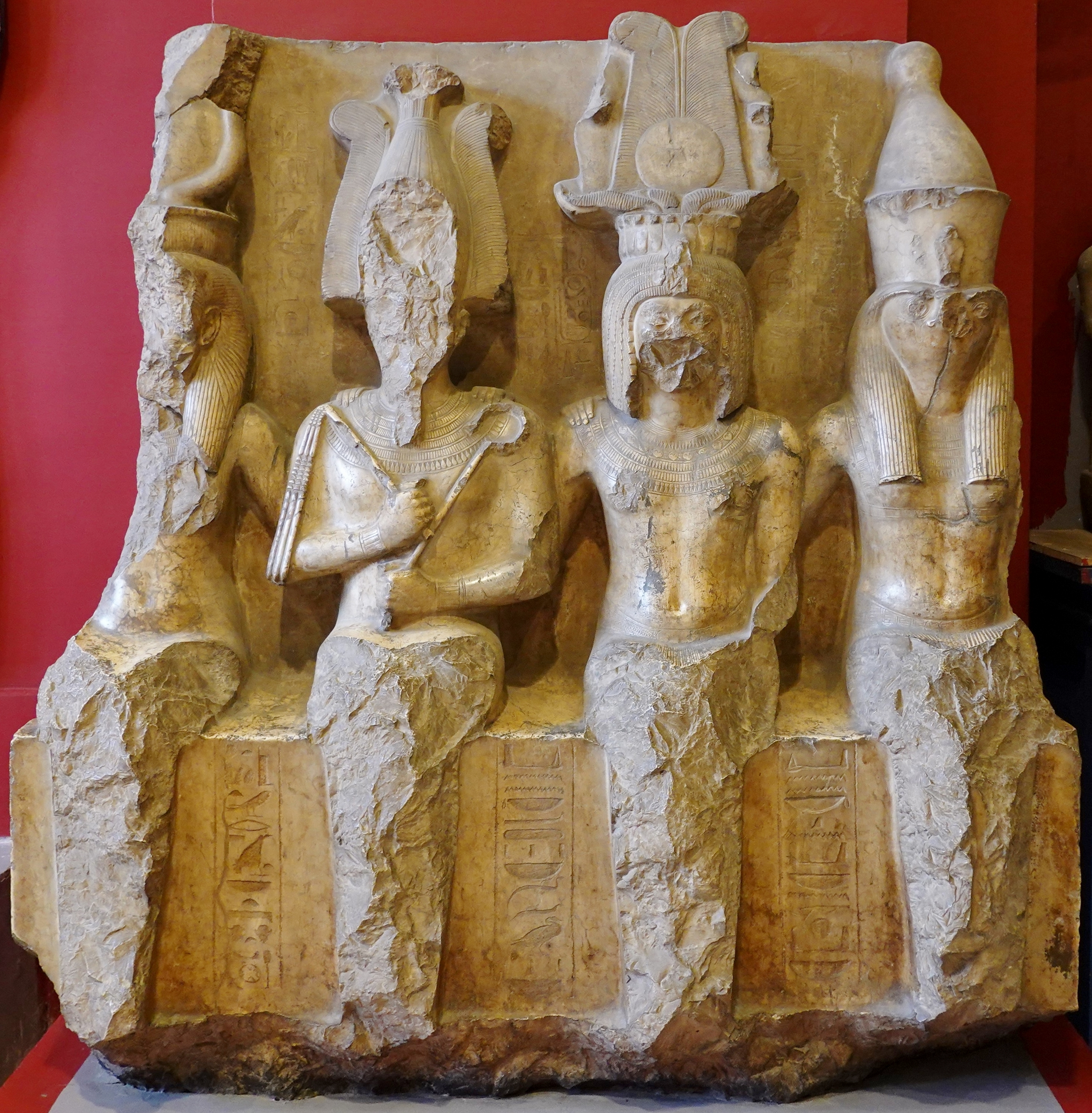
A damaged statue of Horemheb (second from right) sitting with Isis, Osiris, and Horus, Cairo Museum

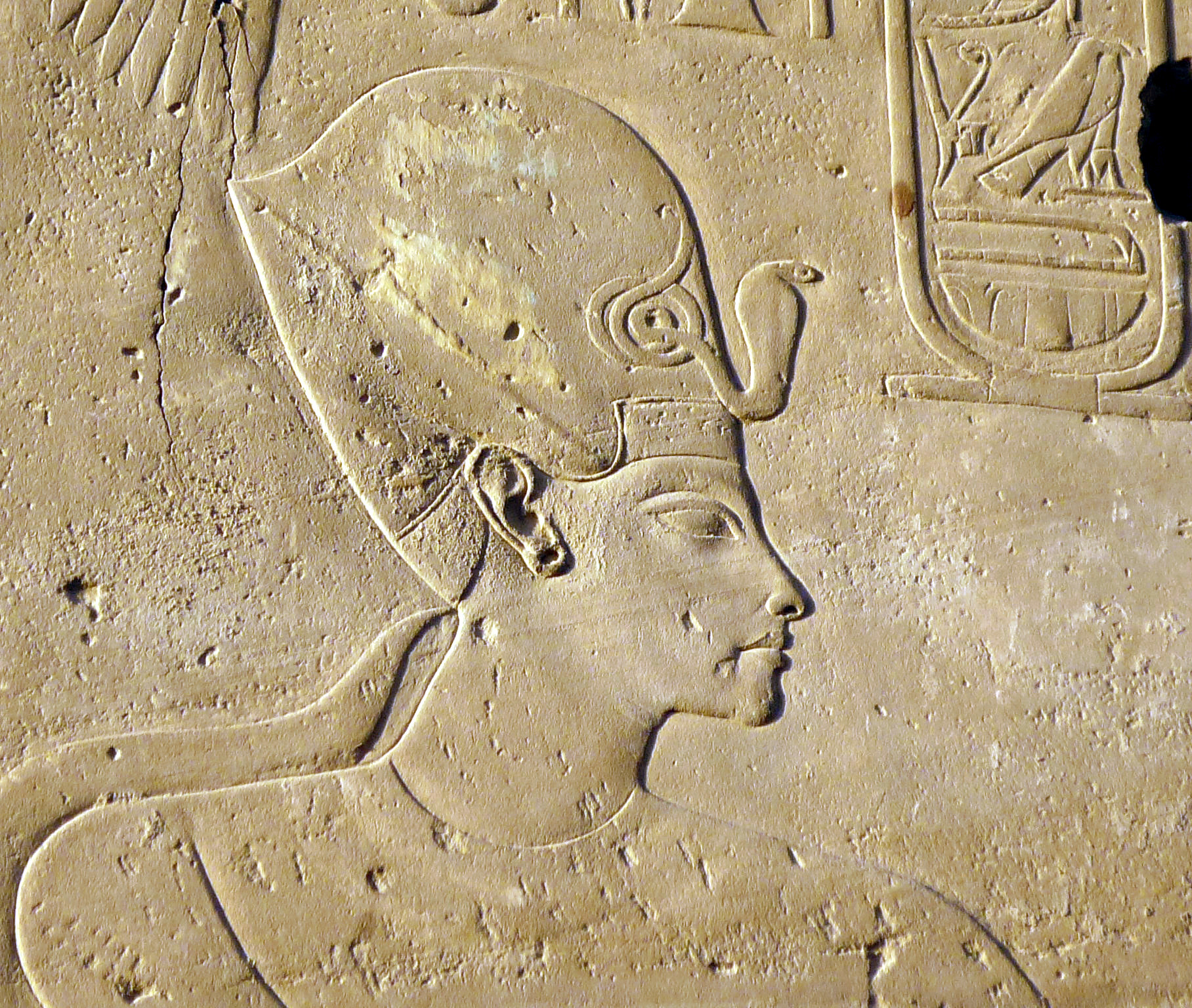
Wall relief of Horemheb on a column of the colonnade of Amenhotep III, Luxor Temple, Egypt

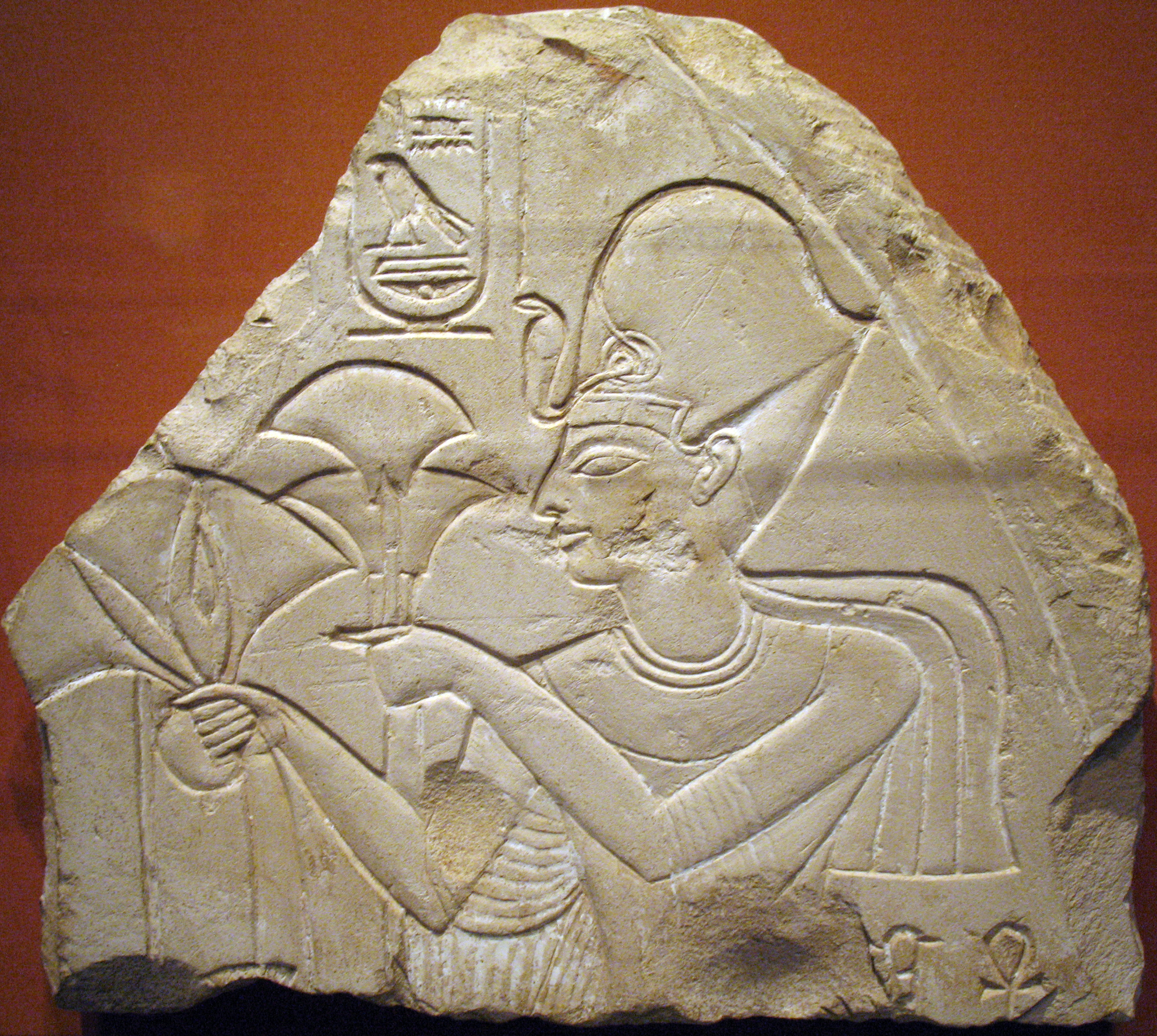
Horemheb making an offering; Egypt, Dynasty 18, Reign of Horemheb

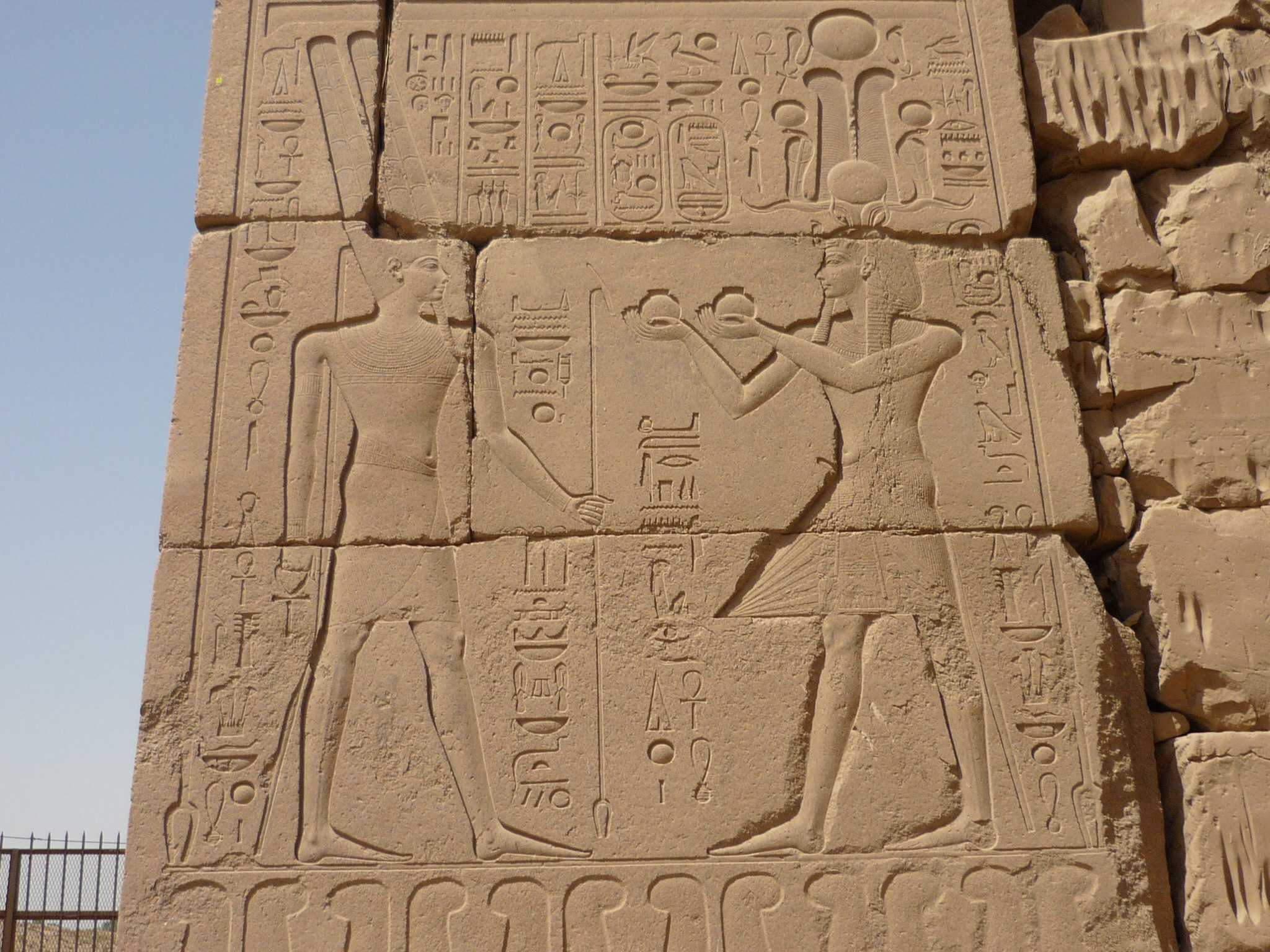
A wall relief of Horemheb making an offering to Amun on the 10th pylon at Karnak

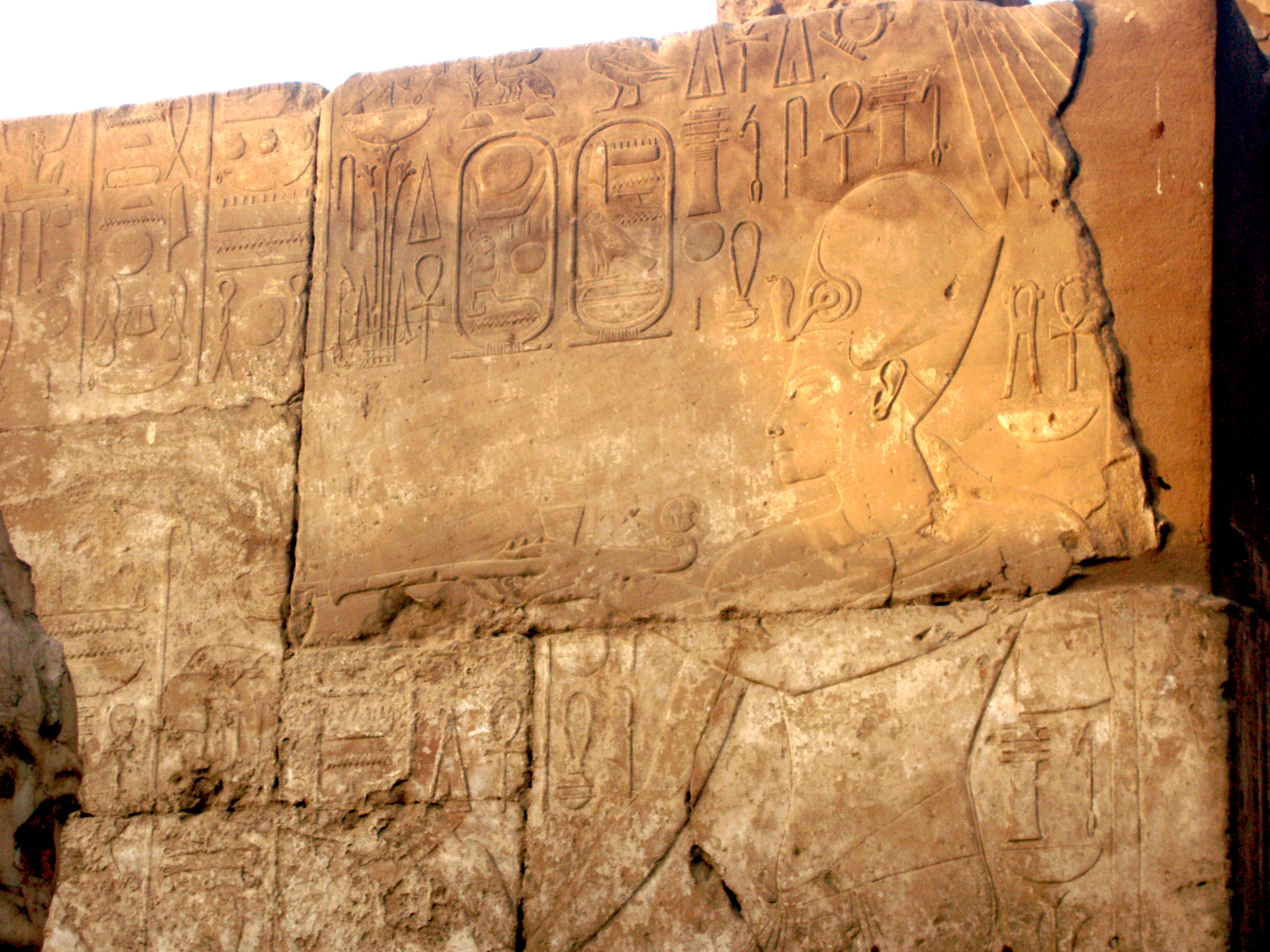
This usurped relief of Tutankhamun shows Horemheb wearing the khepresh crown. Luxor Temple.

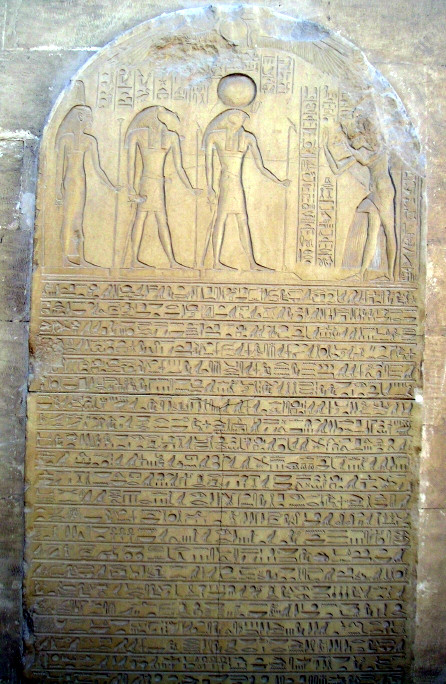
Stele from Horemheb's tomb in Saqqara

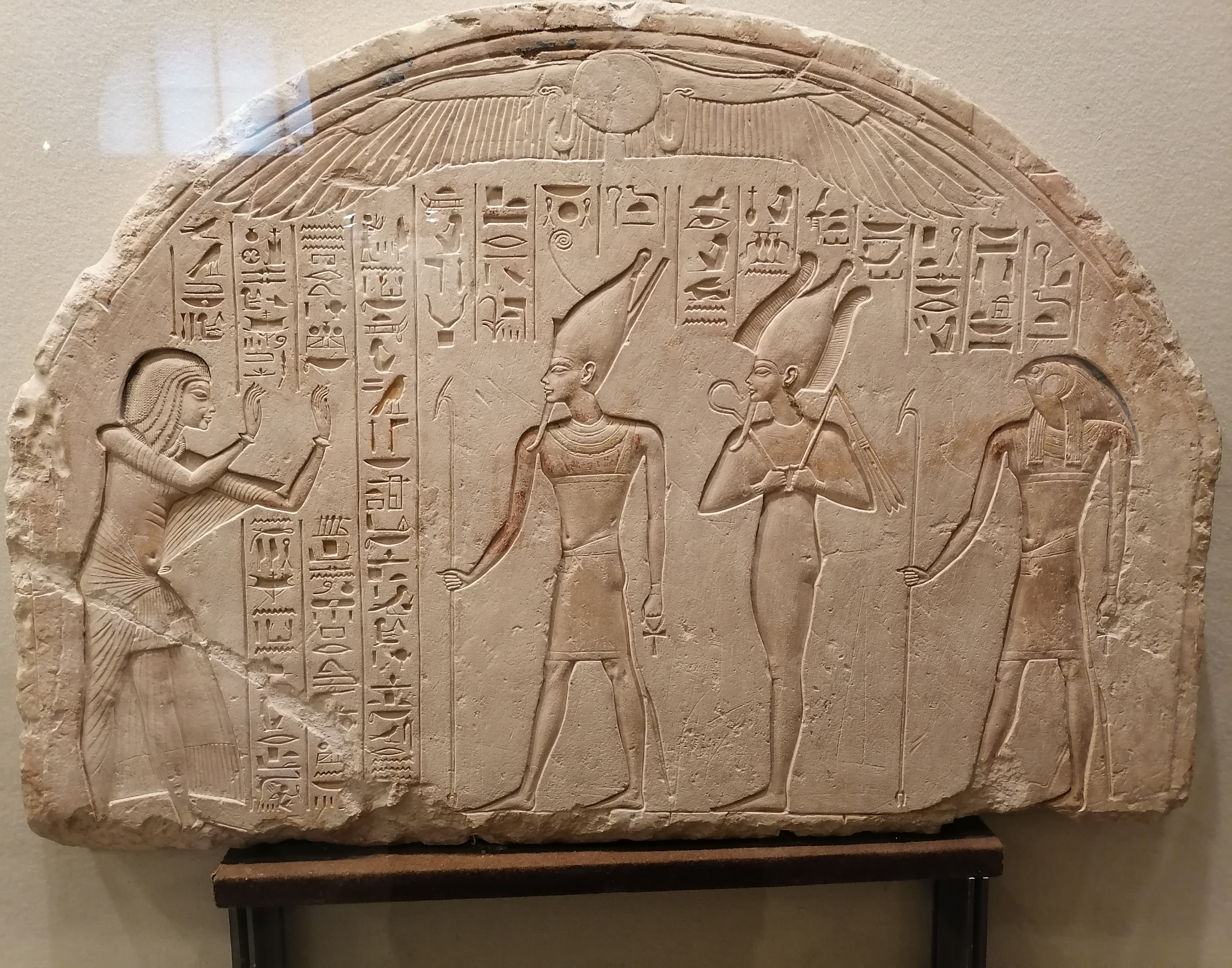
Upper part of the Stela of the commander chief Horemheb (later king) with the depiction of him in front of gods: Atum, Osiris, Ptah-Sokar. Found in his Memphite tomb in Saqqara Limestone. Dynasty XVIII, reign of Tutankhamun. Third quarter of the 14th century BC. Saqqara

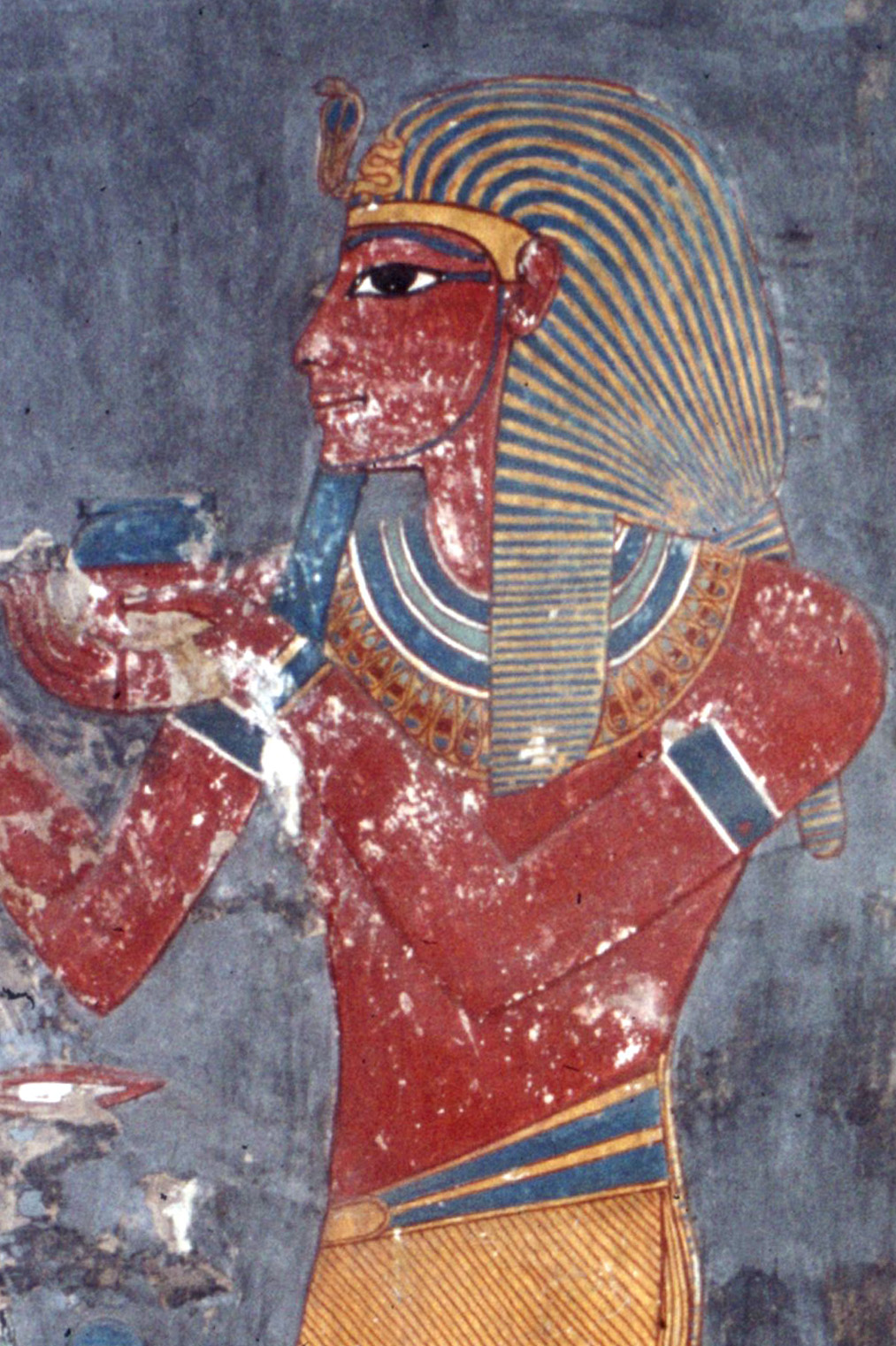
Horemheb, as depicted in his KV57 tomb

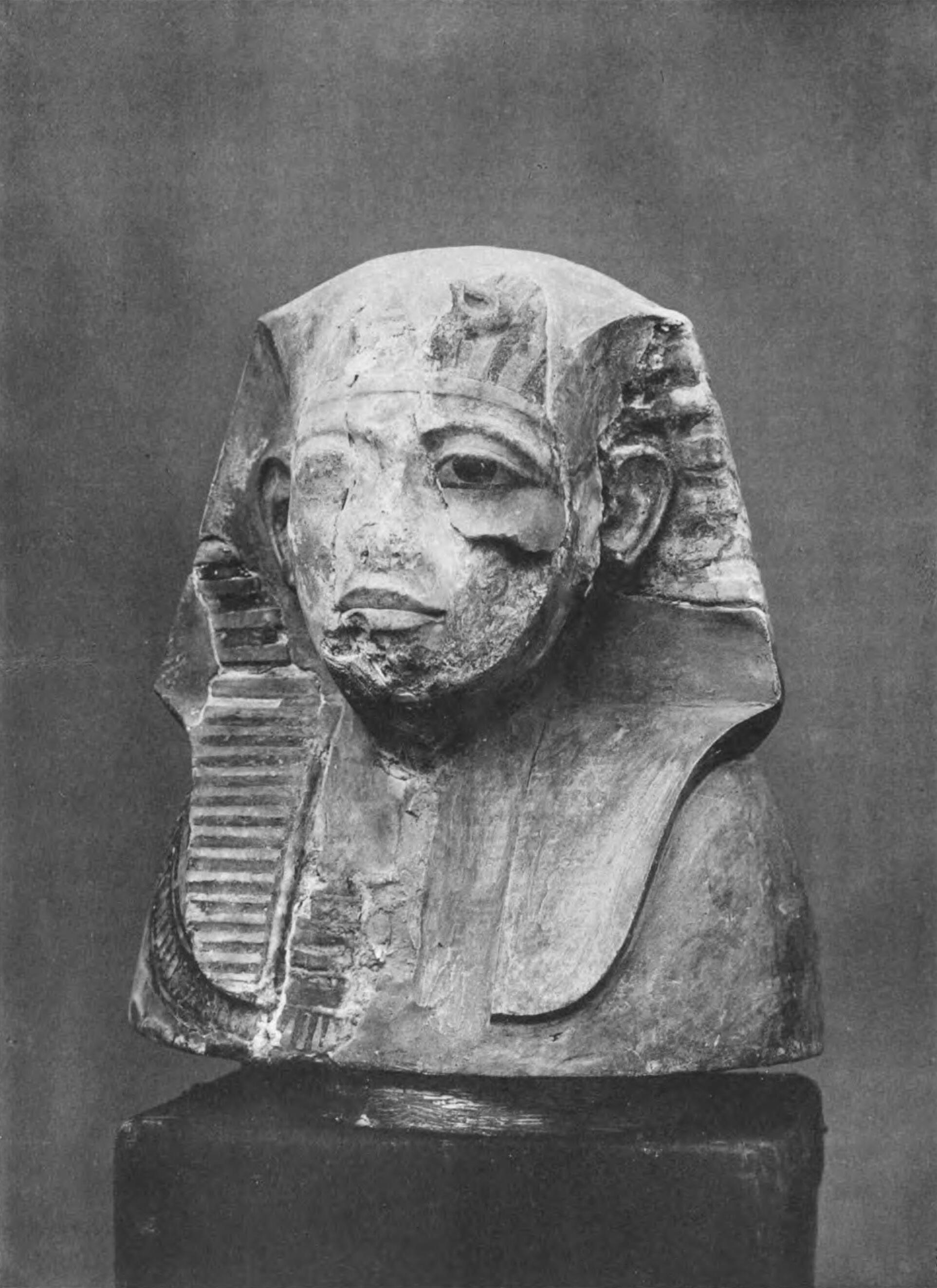
Canopic Jar head of Horemheb found inside his KV57 tomb, wearing the Nemes

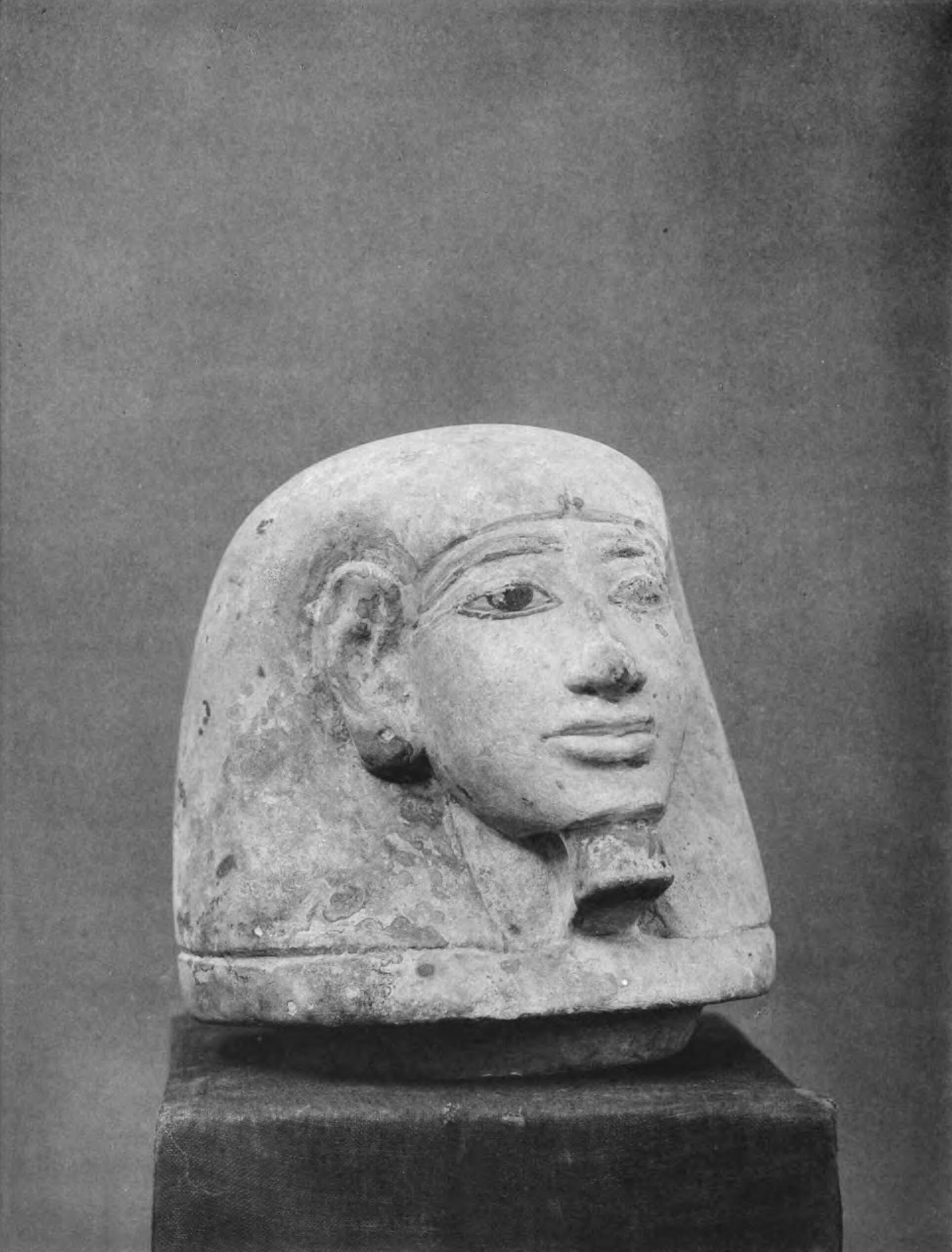
Another canopic Jar head of Horemheb found inside his KV57 tomb, but with less detail. May have originally been created for use within his Memphite tomb in Saqqara.

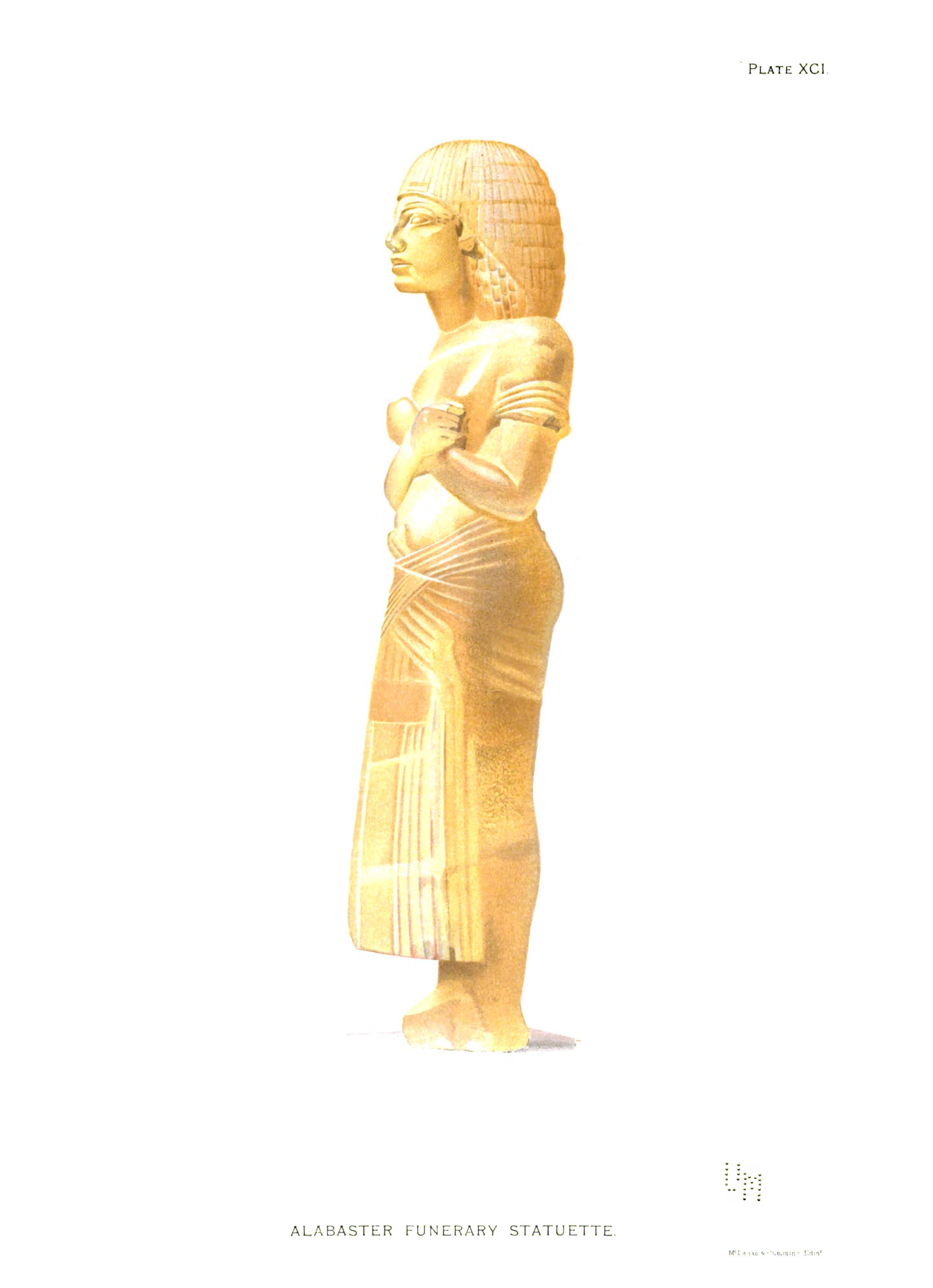
An alabaster funerary statue of Horemheb that was found inside his KV57 tomb

== Cultural depictions ==
=== Film ===
- Horemheb was portrayed by Victor Mature in The Egyptian (1954), the film adaptation of Mika Waltari's bestselling novel.
- Horemheb was portrayed by Salah Zulfikar in Nefertiti and Akhenaton (1973), Mexican short film of Raúl Araiza.

=== Television ===
- Horemheb was portrayed by British actor Nonso Anozie in the 2015 three-part TV miniseries Tut, which aired on Spike in the US, and on Channel 5 in the UK.

=== Music ===
- Horemheb is a character in the opera Akhnaten by Philip Glass; he is sung by a baritone.

=== Literature ===
- Horemheb is a major character in Nick Drake's trilogy of mystery novels, The Book of the Dead, Tutankhamun and The Book of Chaos.
- Horemheb is a major character in P. C. Doherty's trilogy of historical novels, An Evil Spirit Out of the West, The Season of the Hyaena and The Year of the Cobra.
- Horemheb is a major character in Pauline Gedge's historical novel The Twelfth Transforming.
- Horemheb is a major character in Katie Hamstead's trilogy, Kiya: Hope of the Pharaoh, Kiya: Mother of the King and Kiya: Rise of a New Dynasty.
- Horemheb is a key character in Kyah Merritt's historical trilogy A Legacy of Light (trilogy).
- Horemheb is a minor character in the novels Nefertiti and The Heretic Queen by Michelle Moran.
- Horemheb appears as a major character in Lynda Suzanne Robinson's Lord Meren series of Egyptian mysteries.
- Horemheb is a minor character in Chie Shinohara's Japanese graphic novel, Red River, centered around ancient Anatolia and ancient Egypt.
- Horemheb is a major character in Mika Waltari's 1945 historical fiction international bestseller The Egyptian
- Horemheb is a major character, originally named Kaires, in two novels by Allen Drury. This version is the illegitimate son of Ay, and has an affair with Sitamun for many years until he drops the relationship in favor of his kingly ambitions. Initially presented as an easygoing and good-natured courtier, Horemheb becomes increasingly hardened, ambitious, and cynical after being forced to carry out morally questionable tasks, such as killing Anen and raiding the Theban temple of Amun, both on behalf of Akhenaten. He also plays a major role in the deaths of both Akhenaten and Tutankhamun. While Ay outmaneuvers him for the throne after Tut's death (Horemheb had planned to force Ankhesenamun to marry him, but she announced a marriage to Ay instead), Horemheb easily forces his ailing father to accept him as heir a few years later.
- Horemheb is a key character in Judith Tarr's historical novel Pillar of Fire.
- Horemheb is a key character in Lucille Morrison's biographical novel of the life of Tutankhamun's wife Ankhesenamun, The Lost Queen of Egypt.

== Bibliography ==
- Cyril Aldred, "Two monuments of the reign of Ḥoremḥab," Journal of Egyptian Archaeology 54 (1968) 100–106.
- David Aston, (2012), Radiocarbon, Wine Jars And New Kingdom Chronology, Ägypten und Levante 22 (2012) 22–293 & 296 (on Horemheb)
- Jürgen von Beckerath, "Nochmals die Regierungsdauer des Ḥaremḥab," Studien zur altägyptischen Kultur 6 (1978), 43–49.
- Jürgen von Beckerath, Chronologie des pharaonischen Ägypten, MÄS 46, Philip Von Zabern, Mainz: 1997.
- Karen Margaret ("Maggie") Bryson, "Some Year Dates of Horemheb in Context," Journal of the American Research Center in Egypt 51 (2015) 285–301.
- Aidan Dodson, Amarna Sunset, Cairo, 2009.
- Aidan Dodson and Dyan Hilton, The Complete Royal Families of Ancient Egypt, Thames and Hudson, 2004.
- Alan Gardiner, The Inscription of Mes: A Contribution to Egyptian Juridical Procedure, Untersuchungen IV, Pt. 3 (Leipzig: 1905).online
- Nicholas Grimal, A History of Ancient Egypt, Blackwell Books: 1992.
- K.A. Kitchen, "The Basis of Egyptian Chronology in relation to the Bronze Age," Volume 1: pp. 37–55 in: "High, Middle or Low?: Acts of an International Colloquium on absolute chronology held at the University of Gothenburg 20–22 August 1987." (ed.: Paul Aström).
- Ian Mladjov, "Rediscovering Queen Tanodjmy: A probable link between Dynasties 18 and 19," Göttinger Miszellen 242 (2014) 57–70. online
- Thomas Schneider, "Contributions to the Chronology of the New Kingdom and Third Intermediate Period," Ägypten und Levante 20 (2010) 373–404. online
- Jacobus Van Dijk, "New Evidence on the Length of the Reign of Horemheb," Journal of the American Research Center in Egypt 44 (2008) 193–200. online
