= Tomb of Horemheb in Saqqara =

Coordinates: 29°51′57.996″N 31°13′1.160″E

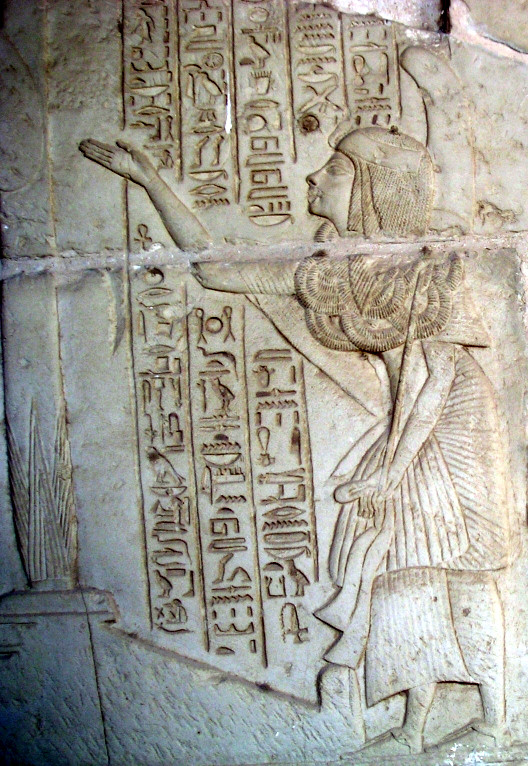
Horemheb, while still an official, receives the "gold of the reward". The uraeus on his forehead was added later, after his coronation.

The Memphite Tomb of Horemheb is located in the Saqqara necropolis, near Memphis, Egypt. It was constructed before Horemheb ascended to the throne and was never used for his burial, since he later built the Theban tomb KV57 for this purpose. His two wives Mutnedjmet and Amenia were buried within the structure.

The tomb was discovered by art robbers at the beginning of the 19th century. Looted reliefs were acquired by a number of European and American museums. The tomb's location was then lost. It was relocated in 1975 and excavated in 1979.

== Building plans ==
The tomb was built in three phases, as Horemheb's status rose. The first design consisted of an entry pylon into forecourt, a colonnaded court containing the burial shaft and three chapels or offering rooms. Intrusive burials were found in the side chapels. The forecourt was then walled to produce two small chapels, one at each side. They were entered by two new piercings through the pylon. A new walled forecourt was constructed in front of the pylon. To make this extension a 5th–6th Dynasty mastaba was demolished and the burial shaft with a burial chamber some 17m below incorporated into the new forecourt. Burials from the 19th Dynasty were found at 9m depth. Finally the forecourt was closed by a pylon some 7m high and colonnaded to form the first peristyle open court. The narrowed original forecourt was covered with a vaulted roof and contained statues while the chapels became storage rooms.

Military scenes were carved on the original peristyle court and scenes showing Horemheb's duties in office on the walls of the later, first peristyle open court including one where he deputised for Tutankhamun on the north wall. On the North wall are scenes from the funeral, showing kiosks with smash pots and mourners. Only the lowest register is well preserved. From the next register above only the legs of horses and the wheels of chariots are visible. On the east wall, on the north side are shown houses. The wall is in general only badly preserved.

== Excavations ==
Excavations were conducted in 4 sessions. Everything that was relieved from the tomb was sent to the Cairo Museum.

=== 1975 ===
In 1975, Geoffrey T. Martin began excavations on the tomb. The first task was to remove large mounds of sand to level the area that was selected to excavate. Immediately upon removal, the tops of mud-brick walls became visible. It was determined to be the outlines of the courtyard. The central area of the limestone-paved Great Courtyard slowly slopes towards a narrow channel in the ground, called a runnel, on the north to assist in rain drainage. Twenty-four limestone columns supported a roof originally, however only 10 survived with the rest only surviving by the base of the columns.These columns were originally decorated with a raised rectangular pattern with rectangle panels, illustrating Horemheb worshipping the various deities. A shrine and procession of foreigners can be observed, with a fine drawing of a horse beneath it. Further down are blocks depicting the Window of Appearances, though finely etched, including a scene in which the king is shown defeating an adversary. Within the courtyard as well is a number of loose blocks with depictions of royalty were of interest to those executing the excavation. A great official adorned with jewelry representative of honor is being supported by attendants or servants, accompanied to the right of him is a larger figure with one hand lowered in a greeting gesture. This find is regarded as one of the best carved reliefs from the Late 18th Dynasty. Traces of color on the walls show that the tomb was painted in the same fashion that the chapels of the Theban tombs were.

=== 1976 ===
By 1976, three main tasks in the excavation process were completed: the western half of the tomb, clearance of the Forecourt in the east area of the tomb, and the excavation of the two chapels. From these areas, blocks of Ramesside and other small finds were found. Any further work would have increased the chances of partially exposing or even damaging another large structure or monument. Additional excavation work was done in the burial shaft in the northwest corner of the main courtyard. Some blocks that were found were from the Old Kingdom; they were reused as building material for the pylon. Chapels A and B were used as dwellings. Chapel B had a stela that attracted a great deal of curiosity. It depicted Horemheb and a lady seated before a funerary priest making a drink offering.The second portion of the courtyard has limestone flags and a runnel similar to that of the Great Court but on the south side instead. The walls are adorned with drawings of the Memphite funerary service.The mourners and their disposition drew the attention of excavators. Entrance to the statue room comes after this, with inscriptions of the titles and epithets of the tomb owner on the doorjambs. There are also unfinished chariot scenes in the courtyard. Additionally, a loose block that was found seems to show that of a military encampment setting, along with the images of the chariots. A fragment of a statue, the head and torso of a female, though severely dilapidated, was found in the debris of the courtyard. The find came from another pair of statues. Martin notes that one of the surprising products of this excavation session was the range of artistic styles observed in the reliefs from this session of the project.

=== 1977 ===
In 1977, the third excavation session took place. This session revealed a wide variety of other valuable artifacts. Shafts in the courtyard had been entered in the 19th century. There were originally 4 burials in this section of the tomb, but upon discovery, excavators found the site to be mostly overturned and or destroyed. The concrete piece of evidence to be gained from the burials was that they were rich, given that lots of gold leaf was found at the site. Lots more pottery was found, though nothing could be given an assigned chamber due to the scatter of the shards. It is known, however, that not all of it was Egyptian, as the fragments show that some pieces were imported Mycenaean pieces. The shafts were emptied until a depth of 17m was reached. Excavators entered another burial chamber containing a late Old-Kingdom sarcophagus in a pit in the floor. According to evidence, this was the burial chamber of a mastaba that Horemheb destroyed in order to erect his architecture. In this section, the walls were adorned with Christian symbols, interestingly. Also within the shafts, many skeletal remains were found. The burial chambers of the shaft stretch down into the underground sections of other tombs by way of robbers' tunnels. At 8 meters lower, the chambers finally intersected each other.

=== 1978 ===
Many more pieces of pottery, skeletal remains, and burials were found in the 4th season of excavations. This session mostly focused on the underground parts of the tomb.

Careful inspection shows that the uraei were added to the images after Horemheb became Pharaoh.

== The British Museum double statue EA 36 ==
In 2009, it was discovered that a hitherto unidentified double statue in the British Museum (EA 36) was in fact a statue of Horemheb and his wife Amenia. The statue was acquired by the British Museum in 1837 from the Anastasi collection. The double statue is somewhat different from other statues in that the wife is shown holding her husband's hand with both of hers. The three clasped hands had broken off. In 1976 the three clasped hands were found during the excavation of Horemheb's tomb. In 2009 a plaster cast was made of the clasped hands and the cast was used to show it was a perfect match for the British Museum double statue, thereby showing the statue was associated with Horemheb's Saqqara tomb.

== Notes and references ==
=== Bibliography ===
- Martin, G. T. (1976). Excavations at the Memphite Tomb of Ḥoremḥeb, 1975: Preliminary Report. The Journal of Egyptian Archaeology, 62, 5–13. https://doi.org/10.2307/3856340
- Martin, G. T. (1978). Excavations at the Memphite Tomb of Ḥoremḥeb, 1977: Preliminary Report. The Journal of Egyptian Archaeology, 64, 5–9. https://doi.org/10.2307/3856425
- Martin, G. T. (1979). Excavations at the Memphite Tomb of Ḥoremḥeb, 1978: Preliminary Report. The Journal of Egyptian Archaeology, 65, 13–16. https://doi.org/10.2307/3856561Martin, G.T. (1989). The Memphite tomb of Ḥoremḥeb, commander-in-chief of Tutʻankhamūn, I. London.
- Martin, G.T. (1991). The Hidden Tombs of Memphis. London. ISBN 0500390266.

=== External links ===
- Virtual Tour in Horemheb’s Tomb created by Salma ElDardiry and Karim Mansour. Saqqara Online. Friends of Saqqara Foundation. Retrieved 2023-05-20.
