= Amenia (wife of Horemheb) =

- Non-royal wife of Pharaoh Horemheb
- Amenia
- Spouse: Horemheb
- Issue: Isitnofret(?)
Name in Hieroglyph
i mn n i A B1
- Transcription: imn-iA
- Dynasty: 18th Dynasty

Amenia was an Egyptian noble lady, the first wife of Horemheb, the last ruler of the Eighteenth Dynasty.

== Life ==
Very little is known about her, and she seems to have died during the reign of Ay or early during the reign of Tutankhamun, before Horemheb ruled as pharaoh.

== Burial ==
Amenia was buried in the Memphite tomb of Horemheb in the upper suite in shaft IV, alongside his second wife Mutnedjmet.

Amenia was represented in the tomb in both inscriptions and statues. She was possibly depicted in a scene in the great courtyard of the tomb, and in a scene in the entrance to the main chapel. She was shown in statues with Horemheb found in two of the chapels of the tomb. Columns in the Second Courtyard show her name Amenia and show her to be a Chantress of Amun.

== The British Museum double statue EA 36 ==
In 2009, it was discovered that a hitherto unidentified double statue in the British Museum (EA 36) was in fact a statue of Horemheb and his wife Amenia. The statue was acquired by the British Museum in 1837 from the Anastasi collection. The double statue is somewhat different from other statues in that the wife is shown holding her husband's hand with both of hers. The three clasped hands had broken off. In 1976 the three clasped hands were found during the excavation of Horemheb's tomb. In 2009 a plaster cast was made of the clasped hands and the cast was used to show it was a perfect match for the British Museum double statue, thereby showing the statue was associated with Horemheb's Saqqara tomb.
