= Neferhotep (disambiguation) =

Neferhotep in hieroglyphs
nfr Htp t p
Nfr-ḥtp
"Beautiful and peaceful"
or
"Perfectly satisfied"

Neferhotep is an ancient Egyptian given name. Notable bearers were:

- Neferhotep I, pharaoh of the 13th Dynasty
- Neferhotep II, pharaoh of the 13th Dynasty, see Mersekhemre Ined
- Neferhotep III, pharaoh of the 16th Dynasty
- Neferhotep (scribe of the great enclosure), during the 13th Dynasty
- Neferhotep, owner of Theban tomb TT6
- Neferhotep "the Younger", owner of TT216 and grandson of the above
- Neferhotep, chief scribe of Amun, owner of TT49
- Neferhotep, god's father of Amun-Ra, owner of TT50
- Neferhotep, a manifestation of the lunar god Khonsu; also a separate deity from which this manifestation may have been derived
