= Hepu (disambiguation) =

Hepu is a county in Guangxi, China.

- Hepu Commandery, ancient China

Hepu may also refer to:

- Hepu (vizier), ancient Egyptian vizier
- Hepu District (河浦区), former district of Shantou, Guangdong
- Hepu, Hubei (河铺镇), town in Luotian County
- Hepu, Zhejiang (鹤浦镇), town in Xiangshan County
