= TT65 =

Theban tomb

Coordinates: 25.7333°N 32.6000°E

Theban tomb TT65
- Burial site of Nebamun; Usurped by Imiseba
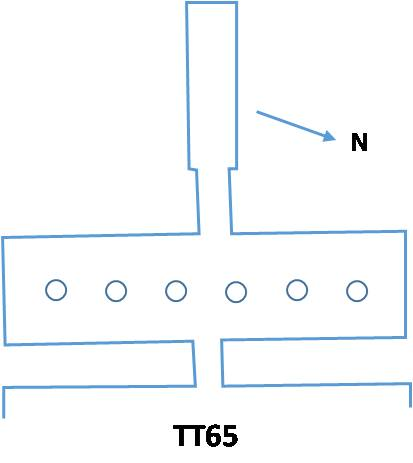

- Location within Egypt
- Location: Sheikh Abd el-Qurna, Theban Necropolis
- ← Previous; TT64 Next → TT66

The Theban Tomb TT65 is located in Sheikh Abd el-Qurna. It forms part of the Theban Necropolis, situated on the west bank of the Nile opposite to Luxor.

i m&n
Nebamun
in hieroglyphs
Era: New Kingdom
(1550–1069 BC)

M18 W19 N14 Z1
Imiseba
in hieroglyphs
Era: New Kingdom
(1550–1069 BC)

The tomb belongs to an 18th Dynasty ancient Egyptian named Nebamun, who was a scribe of the royal accounts in the presence, likely during the reign of Hatshepsut. Later excavations have placed him in year 16 of the reign of Hatshepsut. This person is not to be confused with the official Nebamun, known from the tomb paintings discovered in 1820.

The tomb was usurped by an official named Imiseba who was the Head of the Altar, and the Head of the temple scribes of the Estate of Amun during the reign of Ramesses IX.

== Excavations ==
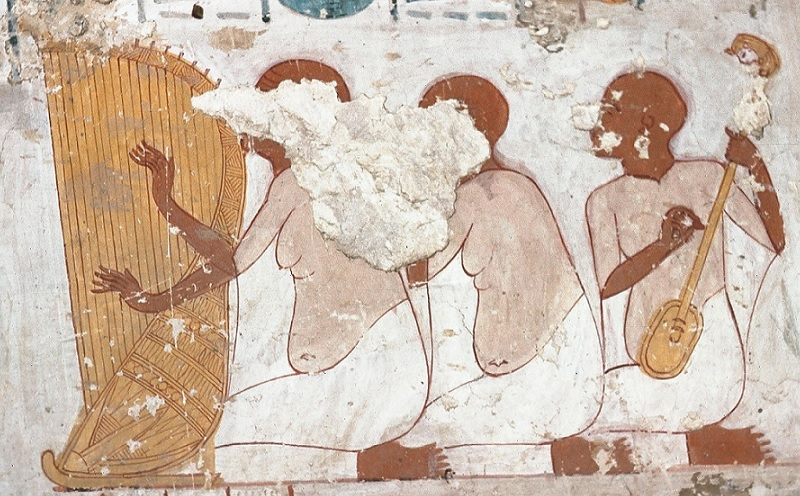
Painting of musicians in Theban Tomb 65. Subjects include a musician with an arched harp and one with a lute.

A Hungarian team has done excavations of the tomb more recently. A report from 2010 indicates there were four burial locations in the forecourt of the tomb and one in the passage inside the tomb which were investigated. The tomb remained at least 23 individuals from a variety of periods.

One of the shafts in the forecourt predates the building of TT65 and held the remains of a King's Son, Overseer of the Foreign Lands, Penre. Excavations in 2009 had shown remains of canopic jars belonging to an individual named Sennefer (no titles known) and a lady named Sitamun. The shaft likely originally intended to hold the burial of Nebamun was never used.

== See also ==
- List of Theban tombs
