= TT66 =

Theban tomb

Coordinates: 25.7333°N 32.6000°E

Theban tomb TT66
- Burial site of Hepu
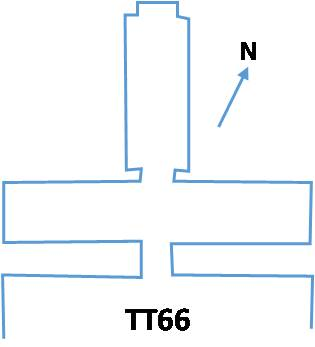

- Location within Egypt
- Location: Sheikh Abd el-Qurna, Theban Necropolis
- ← Previous; TT65 Next → TT67

Aa5 p w
Hepu
in hieroglyphs
Era: New Kingdom
(1550–1069 BC)

The Theban Tomb TT66 is located in Sheikh Abd el-Qurna. It forms part of the Theban Necropolis, situated on the west bank of the Nile opposite Luxor. The tomb is the burial place of the ancient Egyptian Vizier Hepu, who served during the reign of Tuthmosis IV.

The hallway is decorated with scenes showing several workshops. Workers include sculptors, leather and metal workers and vase makers. Scenes depicting the construction of chariots are also included.

The text in the tomb includes the installation of the vizier. Hepu's text is a (partial) replica of the text in the tomb of Rekhmire (TT100), and a similar text appears in the tomb of User.

The inner room includes scenes of a funeral processions, an offering list ritual and a scene showing a son offering to his parents Hepu and his wife Rennai.

== See also ==
- List of Theban tombs
