= Maya (treasurer) =

Treasurer in ancient Egypt

Coordinates: 29°51′59″N 31°13′01″E

- "Overseer of the treasuries" "Overseer of works in the valley of Kings" "Favourite of Horus (the King) in his palace"
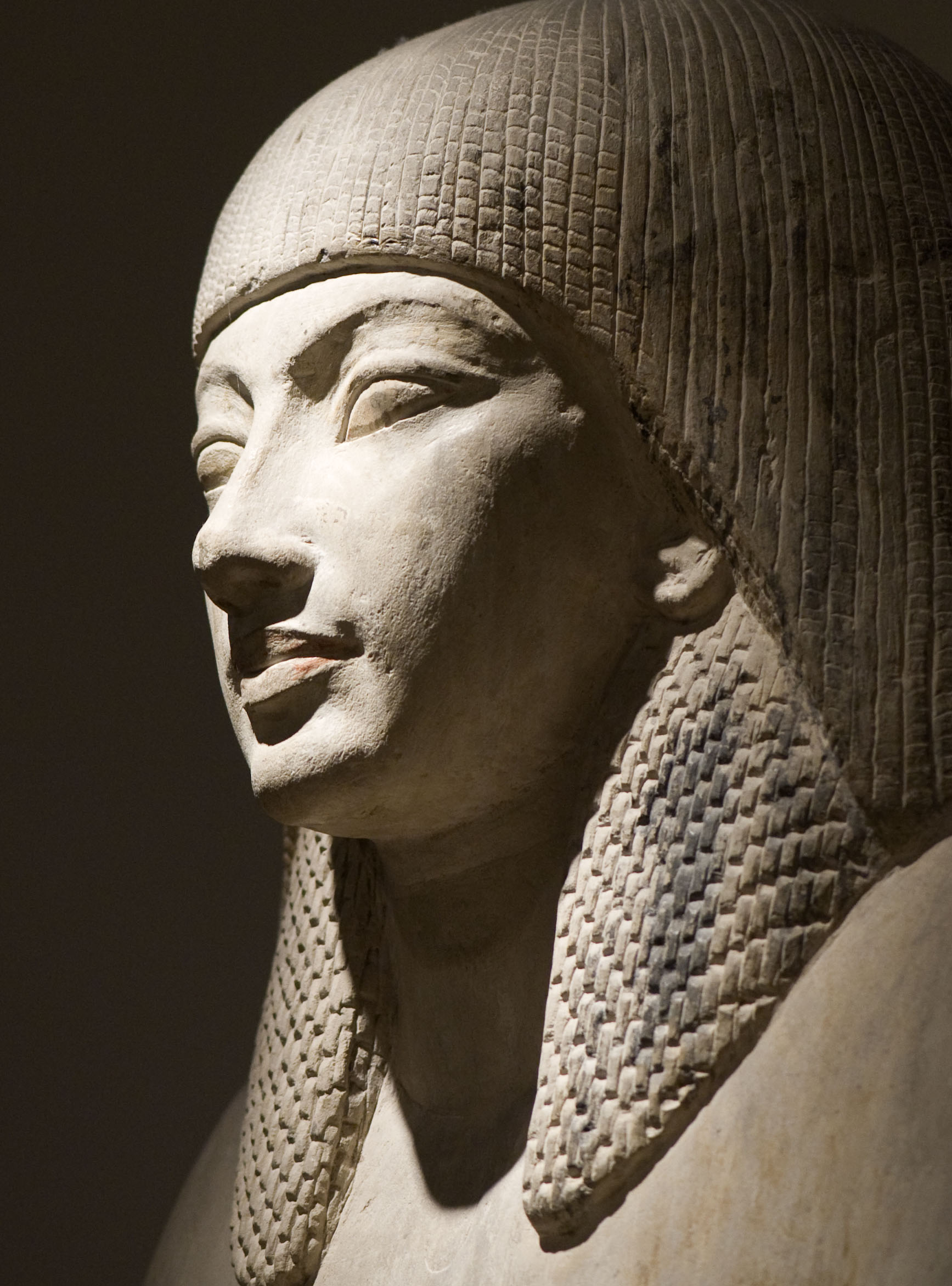
- The head of the statue of Maya
- Dynasty: 18th Dynasty
- Pharaoh: Tutankamun; Ay; Horemheb
- Spouse: Merit
- Father: Iuy
- Mother: Weret
- Children: Mayamenti; Tjauenmaya

Maya was an important figure during the reign of Pharaohs Tutankhamun, Ay and Horemheb of the Eighteenth Dynasty of Ancient Egypt. Maya's titles include: Fan-bearer on the Right Side of the King, Overseer of the treasuries, chief of the works in the necropolis, and leader of the festival of Amun in Karnak.

== Biography ==
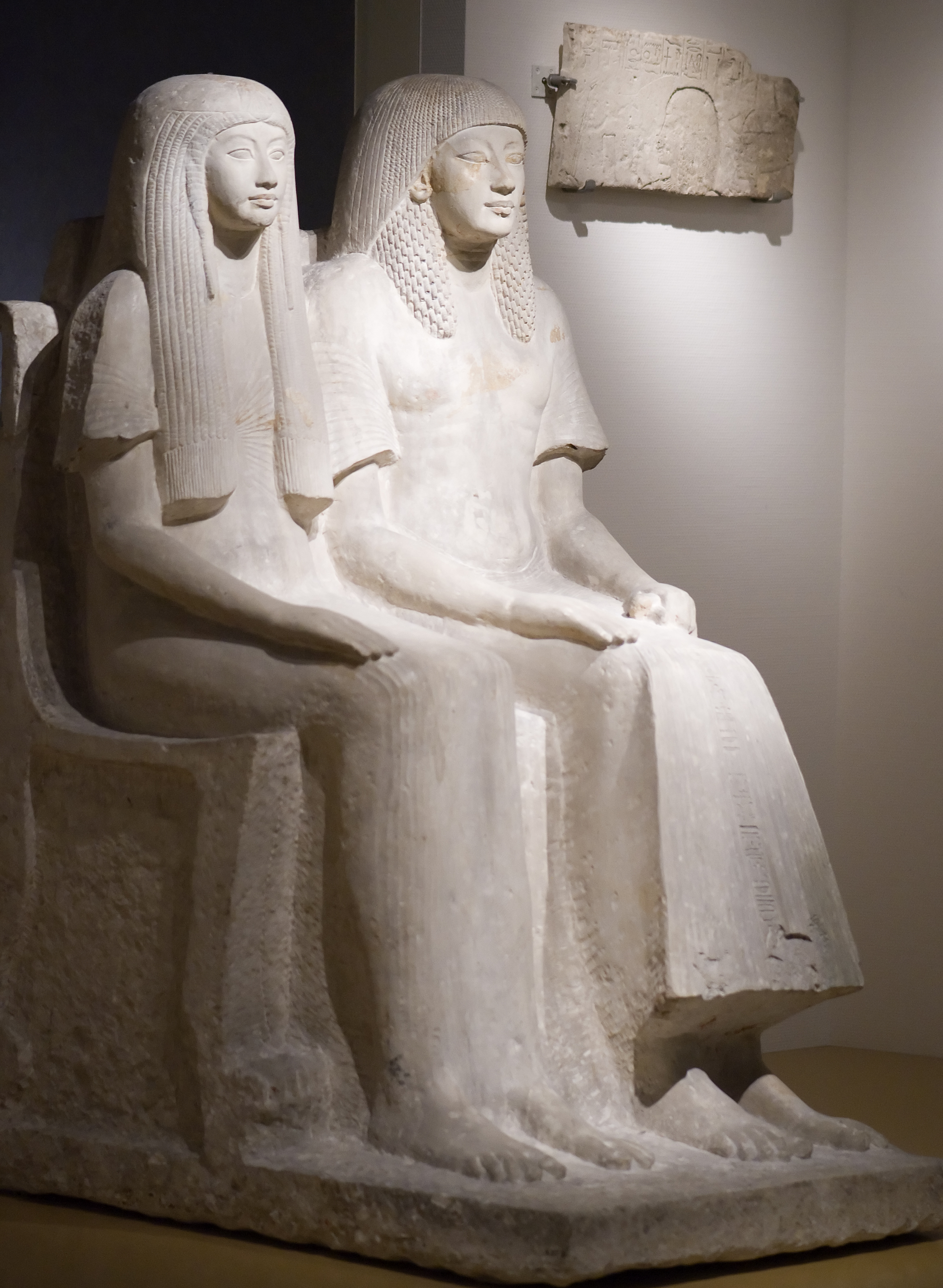
Statue of Maya and Merit from Leiden

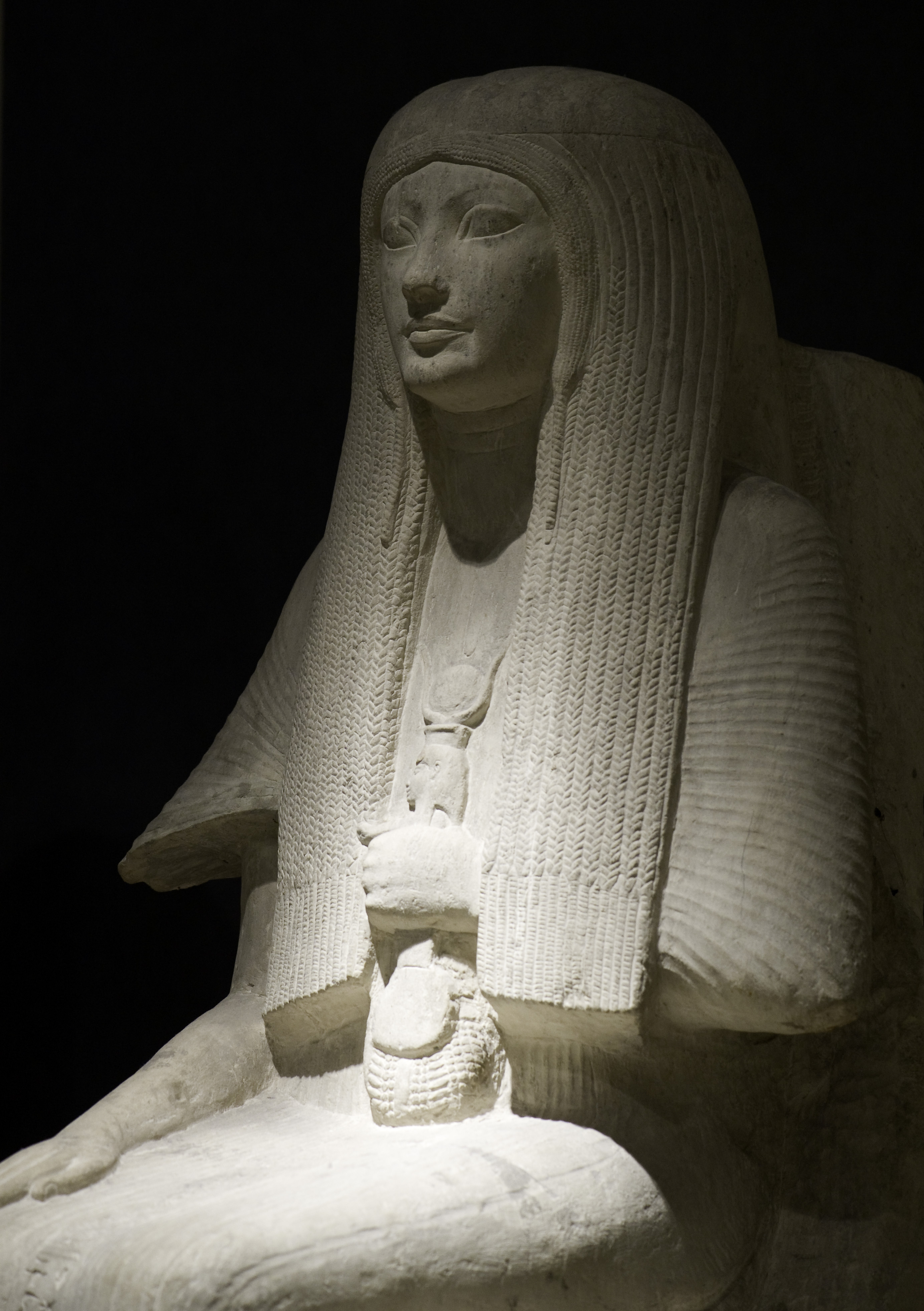
Statue of Meryt who predeceased Maya.

Maya was the son of a magistrate named Iuy and his wife Weret. He had a half-brother named Nahuher who is shown officiating in his tomb in Saqqara. Maya was married to a woman named Meryt, and they had two daughters named Mayamenti and Tjauenmaya.

The early years of Maya's life and career are not well known. It is possible that Maya started his career during the reign of Amenhotep III. He may be the same person as a royal scribe named Maya who is attested in Malkata in year 34. He may also be the same person as a courtier named May known from a tomb in Amarna during the reign of Akhenaten. The May from Amarna shares some of the titles with Maya, but he was not a treasurer.

Maya is well known from the reign of Tutankhamen however. As the Overseer of the treasuries, he was also an important official and was noted for restoring the burials of several earlier Pharaohs in the Royal Necropolis in the years following the deaths of Tutankhamun and Ay. It is possible that he personally left a hand written text in the tomb of Thutmose IV stating that he had been charged with the restoration of the burial of the king. Maya would have reported to the vizier of Lower Egypt, who was based in Memphis.

Maya collected taxes and performed other services for these pharaohs, including supervising the preparation of their tombs.

Maya contributed an Ushabti to the funerary furnishings for King Tutankhamun. He also presented the king with a figure of the King in the guise of the god Osiris. Both items were inscribed and recorded that Maya was the donor of the statues. Meryt, Maya's wife, is known to have died before her husband since her funeral was performed by Nahuher, Maya's half-brother.

Maya is known to have lived until at least Year 8 of Horemheb when an inscription mentions he was charged with tax collection for the entire country and organizing offerings for the gods. He is also depicted in TT50, the tomb of a divine father of Amun named Neferhotep. Maya is depicted between King Horemheb and the viziers showing his close relation to the king. Maya is believed to have died in Year 9 of Horemheb.

== Titles ==
Maya held many prestigious titles in his lifetime; which were recorded in his tomb

=== Administrative titles ===
- Overseer of the Treasury of the Lord of the Two Lands
- Overseer of the Treasury of Silver and Gold
- Overseer of the Double Treasury of Gold
- Overseer of the Double Treasury of Silver

=== Religious titles ===
- Guardian of the secrets of the House of Gold in the temples of all gods
- He who leads the procession
- He who leads the feast of Amon
- Guide to the feast of Amon in Karnak

=== Appellation titles ===
- Loved by the Lord of The Two Lands
- One that the Lord of The Two Lands loves because of his virtues
- [He] Who does what pleases his majesty
- Who does what pleases the Lord of the Two Lands
- (He) whose every act satisfies the One (the king)
- (His) conduct is beneficial in his heart (the king)
- (He) whose ka was shaped by the Lord of the Two Lands
- Great in the Palace
- Great in his dignity
- pleasant (in) the heart of the sovereign

== Tomb and burial ==
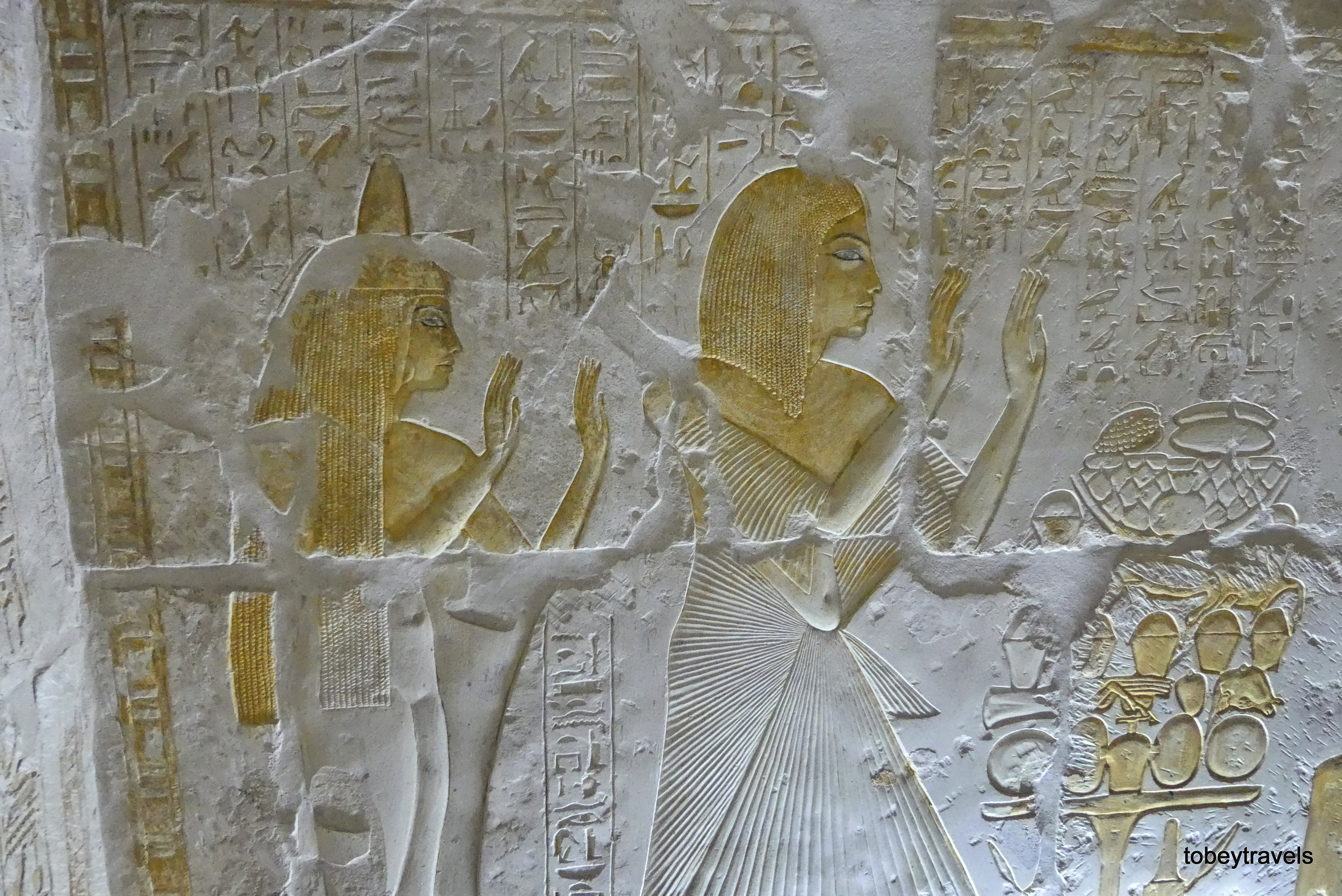
Maya and Meryt shown in a pose of adoration in Maya's Tomb.

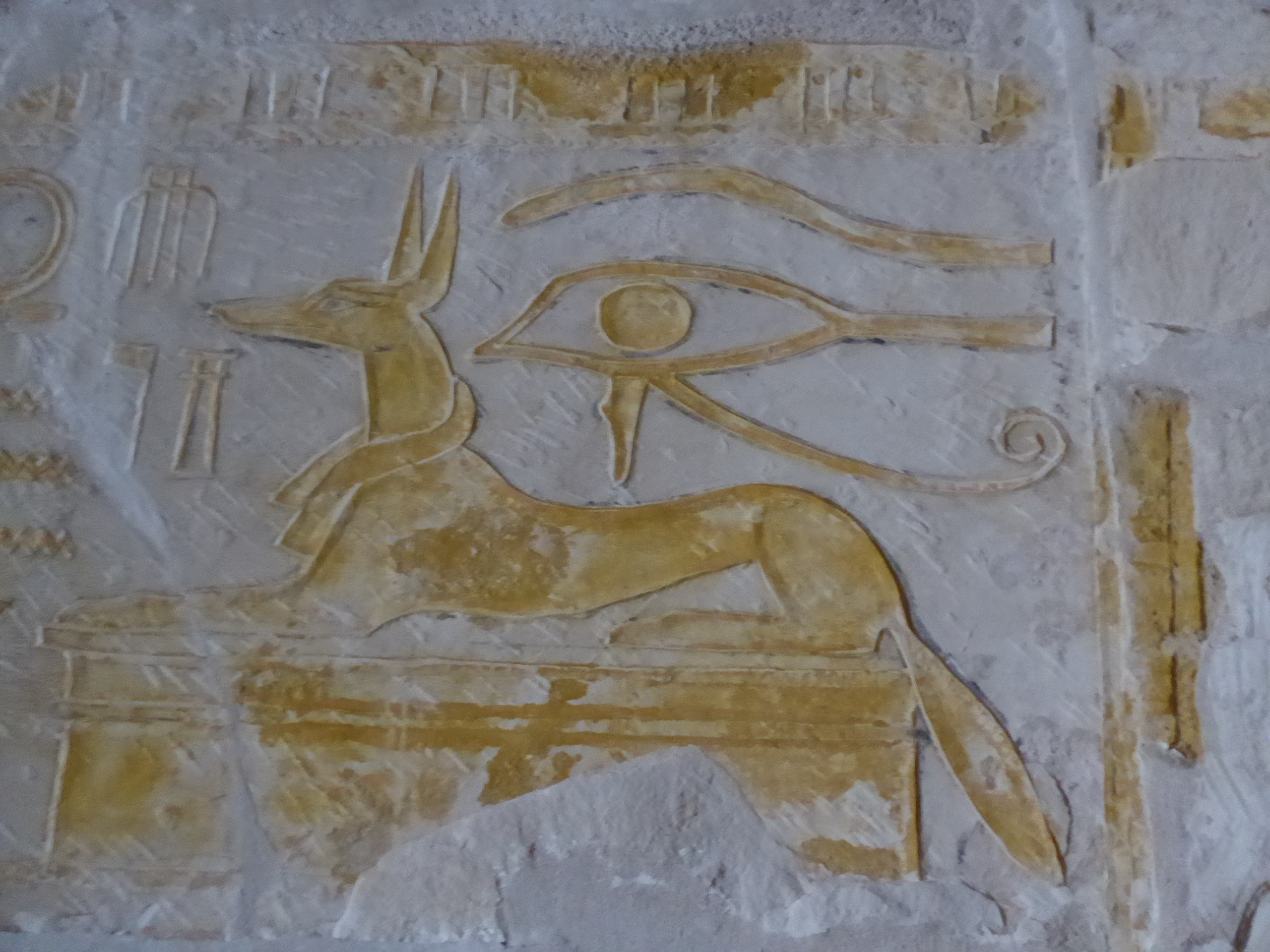
Anubis in the Tomb of Maya

Maya's own tomb at Saqqara was initially partly excavated in 1843 by the archaeologist Karl Richard Lepsius, and its impressive reliefs were recorded in sketches and some of them brought to Berlin. Over time, however, the tomb was covered by sand, and its location was lost. In 1975, a joint expedition of archaeologists from the Egypt Exploration Society in London and the Rijksmuseum van Oudheden in Leiden, Netherlands began a quest to rediscover the tomb, and on 6 February 1986, they finally succeeded. On this date, Professor Geoffrey T. Martin together with Dr. Jacobus Van Dijk representing the Leiden museum discovered the burial chamber of Maya's subterranean tomb at Saqqara some 18 metres (60 feet) below the surface.

As Martin states:

We were in total darkness for about 15 minutes...Suddenly we glimpsed wonderful reliefs and were extremely startled to find ourselves in the antechamber leading to a burial chamber. My colleague looked across at an inscribed wall and said, 'My God, it's Maya.

The first full season's work on Maya's burial in early 1987 indicated that his tomb is "a slightly smaller and abbreviated version of Horemheb's Saqqara tomb. An open courtyard has a collanade on its west side and doors leading to three vaulted ceilings. An inner courtyard has been found to contain reliefs of very fine quality and a statue of Maya and his wife." The underground burial chambers were paved with limestone and decorated with reliefs showing Maya and his wife in front of gods.

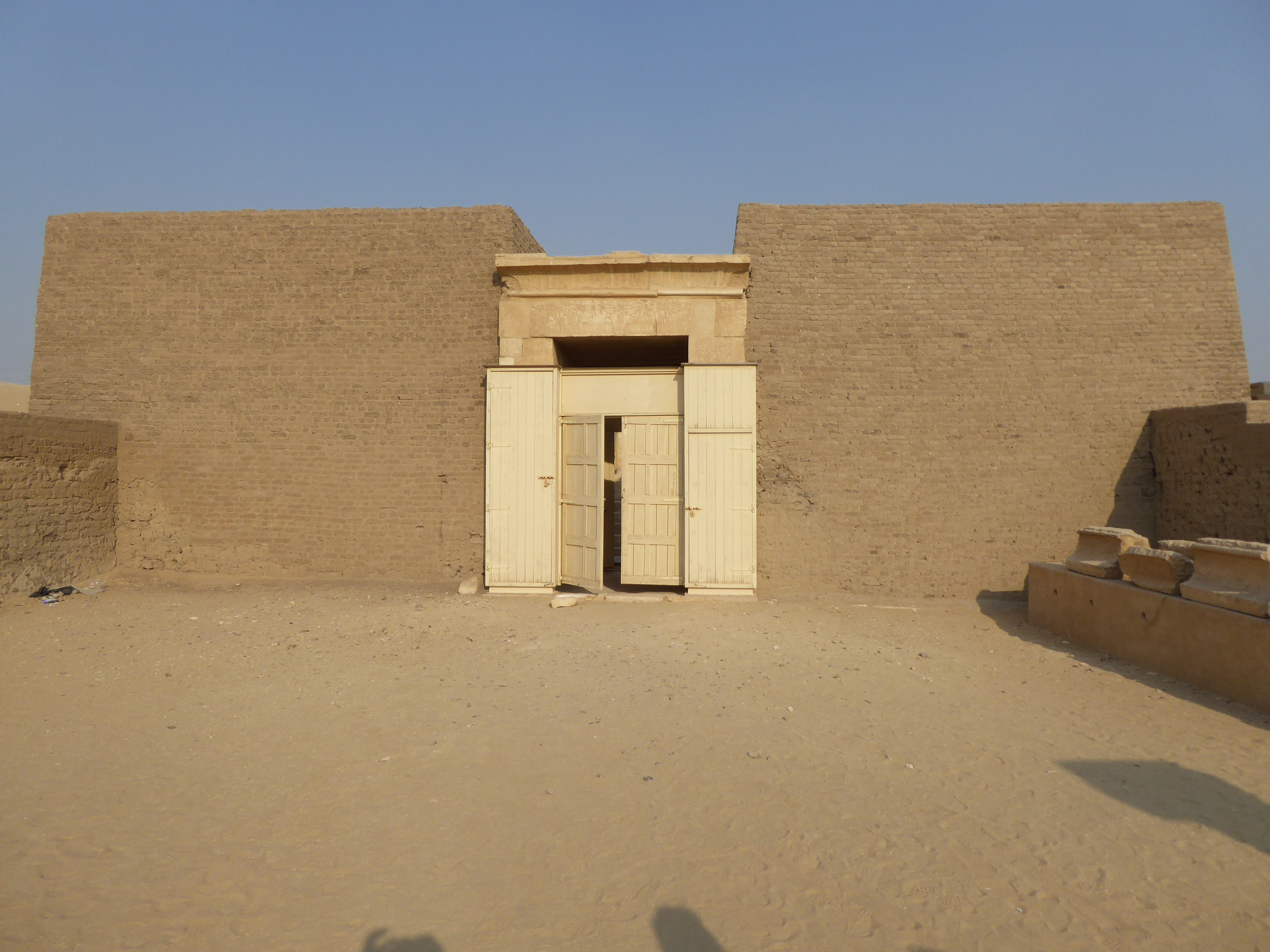
An exterior view of Maya's tomb at Saqqara.

Maya and Meryt's tomb was excavated between 1986 and 1991 and lies parallel to Horemheb and Tia's Saqqara tombs. It is almost 44 metres long and 16.5 metres wide and features "a pylon, outer courtyard, statue chamber flanked by two storerooms, inner courtyard, and three offering chapels in the west wide." Maya's tomb was unfinished: the outer courtyard featured columns along the west side only, a mud floor instead of proper pavement, and no reliefs while its pylon was built in mudbrick only, and not revetted in limestone like Horemheb's tomb. Maya's tomb-shaft opens in the inner courtyard and is about 10 metres deep. From one of the six chambers at that level, a second shaft and stairway give access to a lower complex, situated at a depth of almost 22 metres which comprises three chambers featuring reliefs depicting Maya and Meryt adoring the gods of the hereafter. Both their figures and texts were painted yellow, with some details in blue and black. While tomb robbers had looted most of the valuables, numerous remaining fragments of coffins, furniture, jewellery, etc. gives an impression of the wealth of Maya's burial.

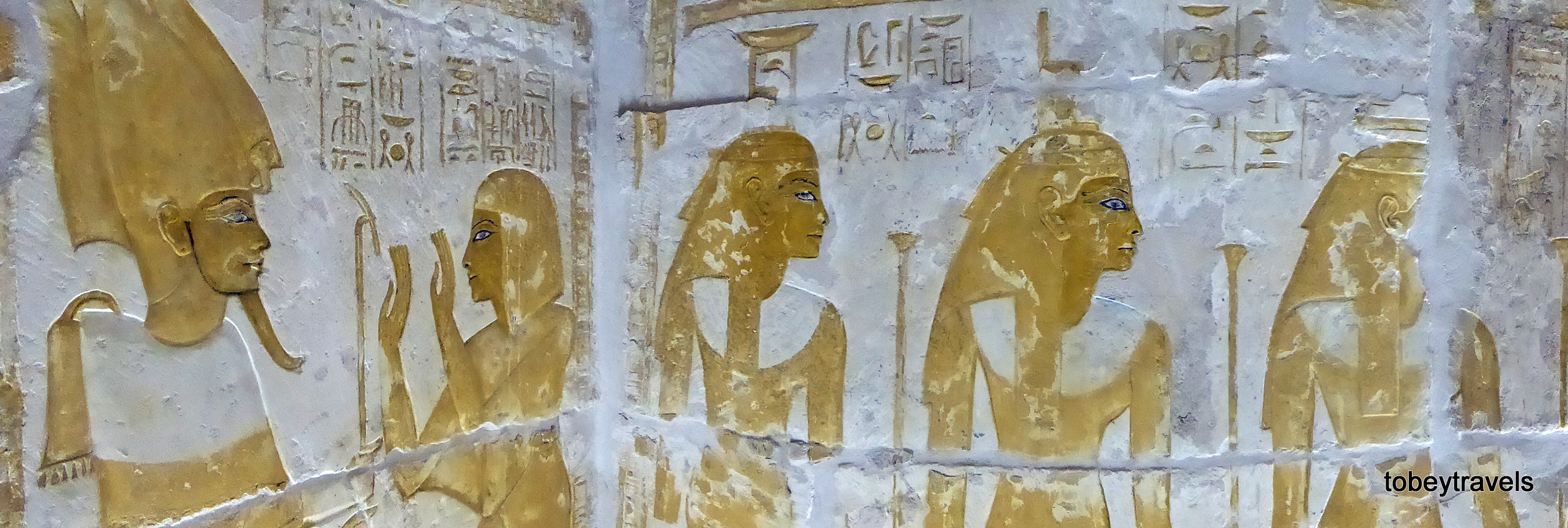
Maya adoring Osiris in his Saqqara tomb (left)

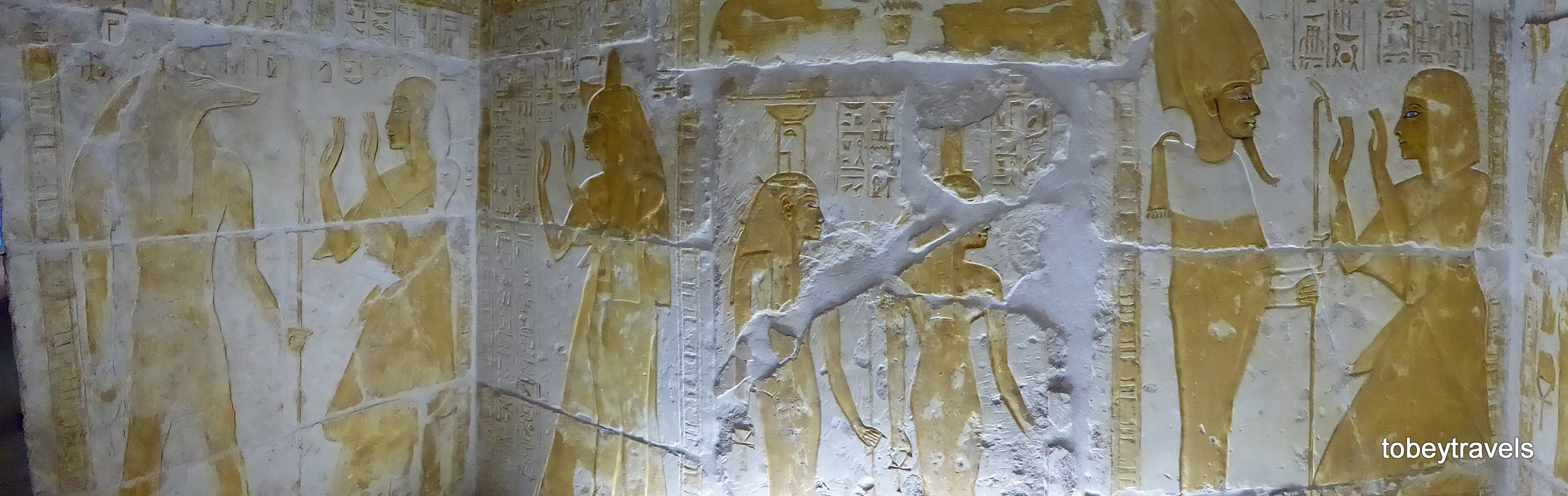
Maya and Meryt depicted adoring Sobek in Maya's Saqqara tomb (left)

== Statues of Maya and Meryt ==
The three statues of Maya and his wife Merit have been put on display in the National Museum of Antiquities in Leiden, Netherlands since 1823. Recently, the pair has been lent to The Archeological Civic Museum (MCA) of Bologna from 17 October 2015 to 17 July 2016.
