= TT69 =

Theban tomb

Coordinates: 25.7333°N 32.6000°E

Theban tomb TT69
- Burial site of Menna
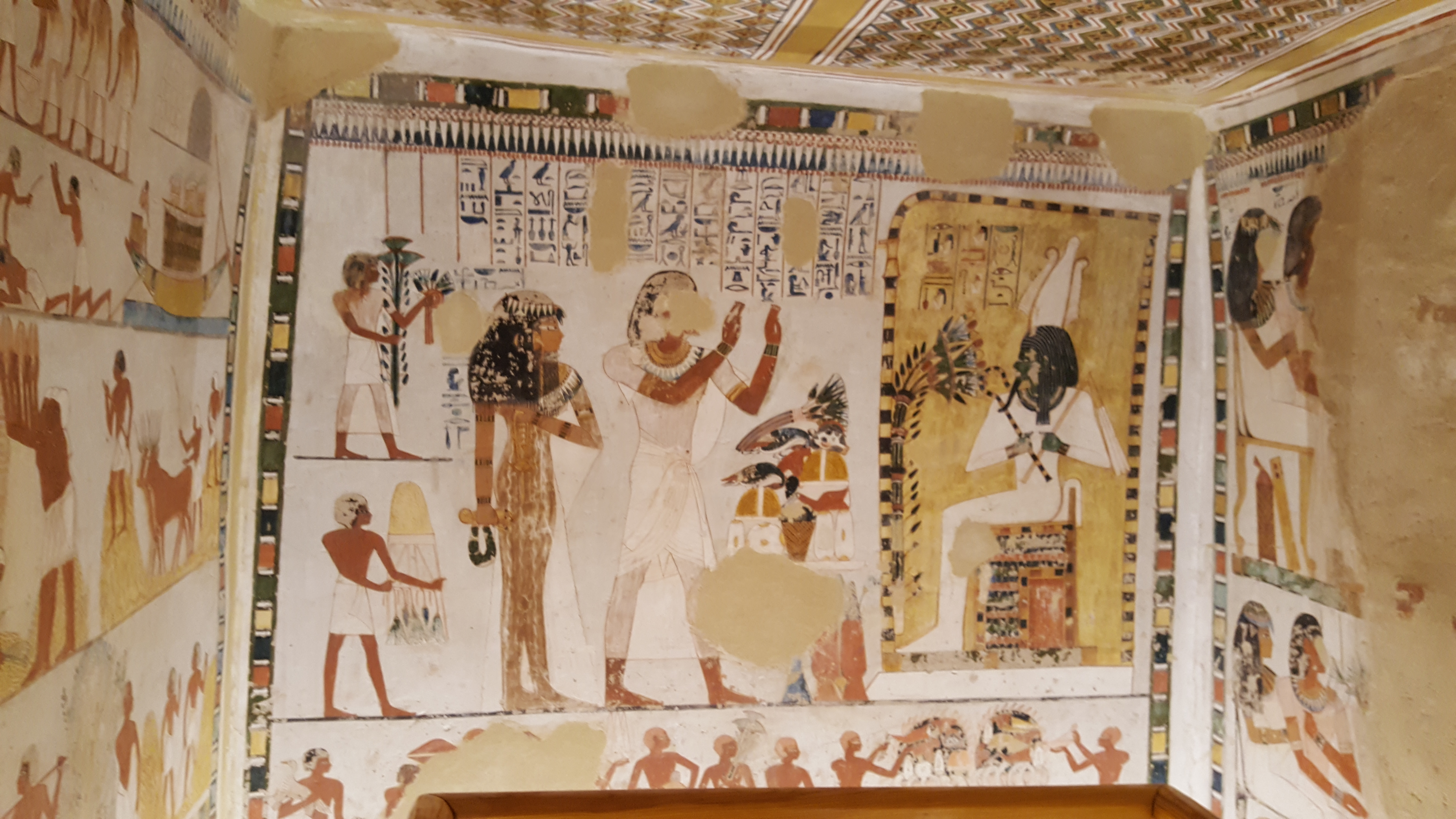
- Menna and Henuttawy before Osiris, who is seated in a kiosk

- Location within Egypt
- Location: Sheikh Abd el-Qurna, Theban Necropolis
- ← Previous; TT68 Next → TT70

Theban Tomb 69 (TT 69) is located in Sheikh Abd el-Qurna, part of the Theban Necropolis, on the west bank of the Nile, opposite Luxor. It is the burial place of the ancient Egyptian official named Menna, whose titles included ‘Overseer of Fields of Amun’, and ‘Overseer of Fields of the Lord of the Two Lands’. Traditionally, TT 69 has been dated to the reign of Thutmosis IV. However, recent art historical studies of artistic style suggest the majority of the tomb was decorated during the reign of Amenhotep III.

== Layout and decoration ==
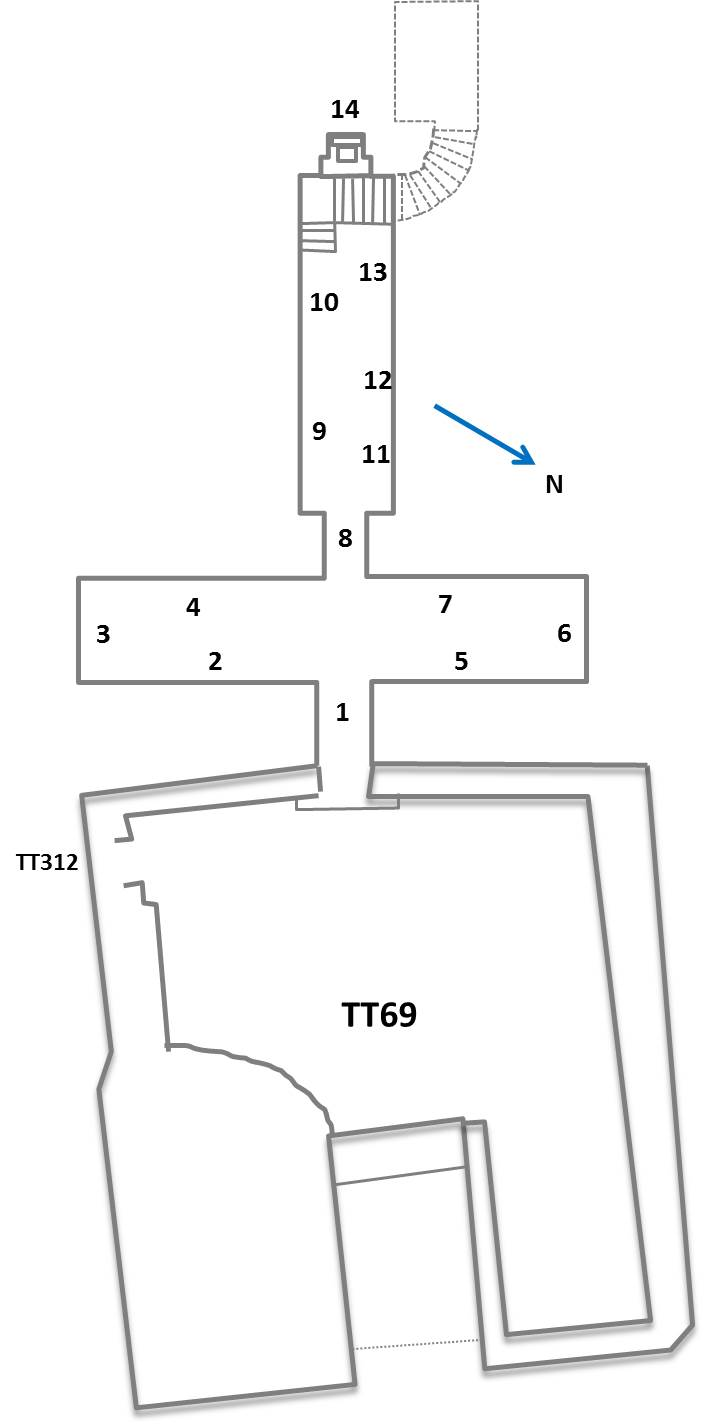
Plan of TT69

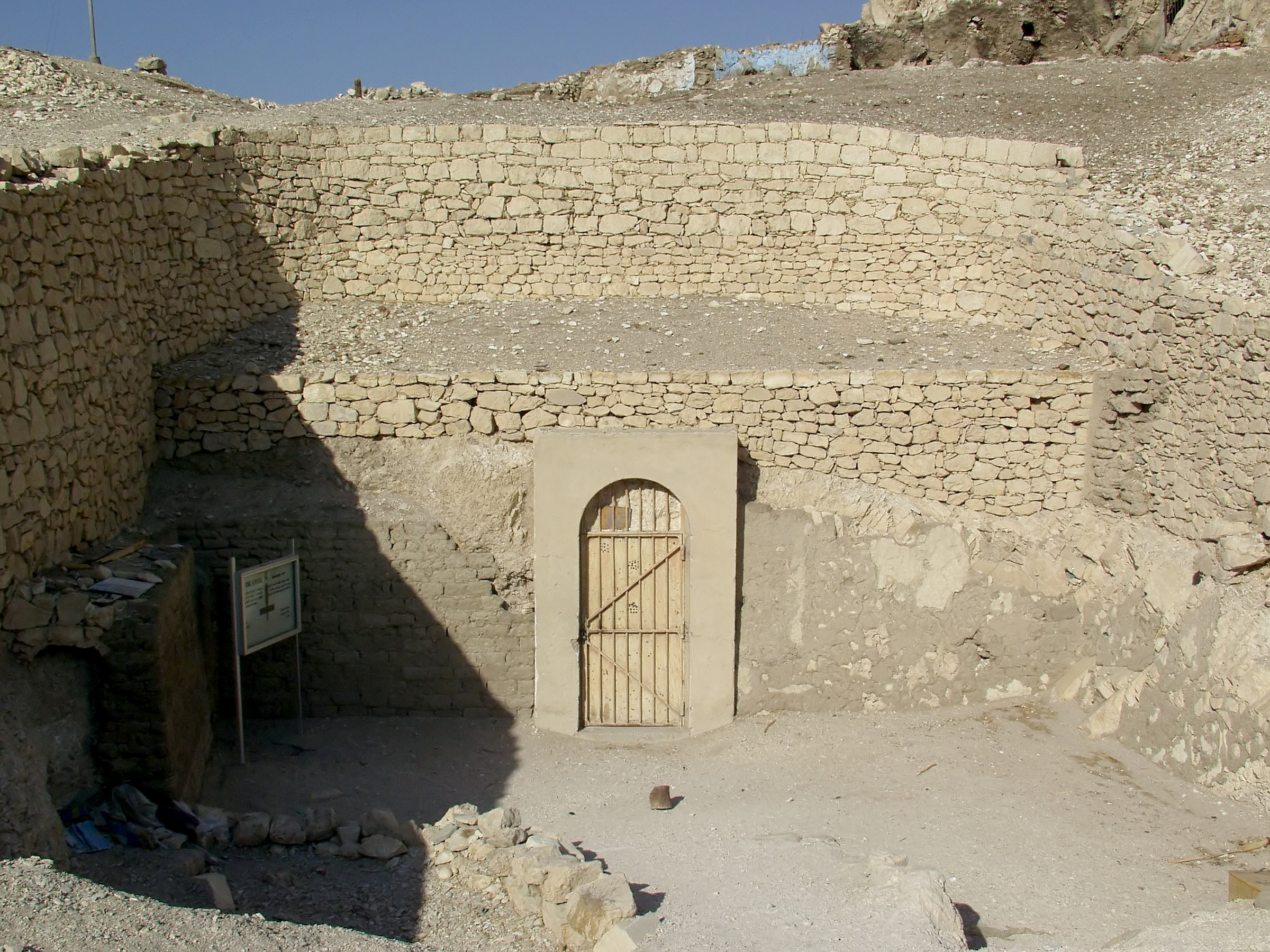
Tomb of Menna (TT69) - Entrance

The layout of TT 69 is typical of 18th Dynasty Theban tombs with an outer courtyard, a T-shaped rock cut chapel, and a subterranean burial chamber. The tomb sits on an east–west axis, with the central shrine oriented to the west, and the entrance to the tomb oriented to the east. This east–west alignment placed the tomb within the solar cycle, associating the shrine with the setting sun, and thus death and the realm of the dead, and the entrance with the sunrise, and with rebirth and life.

=== Courtyard ===
Tombs at Thebes often had a superstructure that included a sunken courtyard often surrounded by a low mudbrick enclosure wall. This space, which was open to the sky, connected the tomb to the solar cycle, and was the location for certain rituals at the time of the funeral, such as the opening of the mouth ceremony. The courtyard of TT 69 was sunk into the ground and a mudbrick enclosure wall was built around it. It is accessed today by a modern ramp, but in antiquity it appears to have had mudbrick stairs. Mond also records a decorated doorway and lintel, though today there is a modern doorway made of concrete and metal. Ancient mudbrick is still present, though it has been bolstered with modern mudbrick and concrete.

=== Front Room / Broad Hall ===
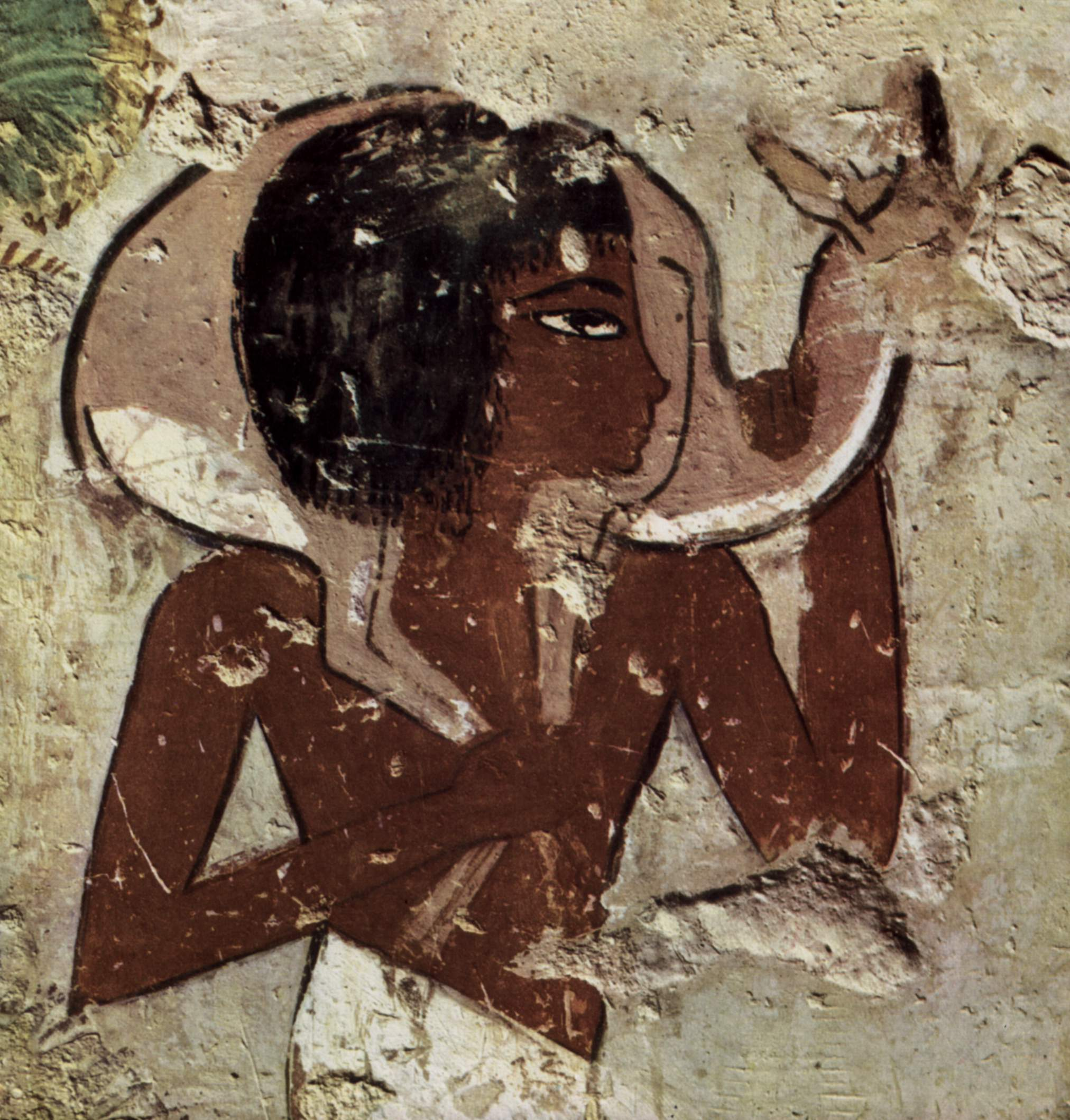
Detail of painting in the tomb

The rock-cut chapel of TT69 is laid out in a T-shape consisting of a front room, a back room, and a central shrine niche. The front and back rooms are oriented perpendicularly to one another creating an inverted T. The front room of TT69 is often also called the broad hall or the transverse hall. This differentiates it from the back room, called the long hall due to its orientation.

The decoration in the broad hall of TT 69 focuses on the life of the tomb owner, Menna. Since the majority of titles Menna carries are associated with agriculture, the tomb includes a well preserved scene of agricultural production. Menna is shown a number of times on this wall, both seated and standing, overseeing the various stages of grain production including plowing, harvesting, and winnowing. This scene emphasizes the importance of Menna's various roles within the administration of royal and temple agriculture.

Other scenes in the broad hall show Menna and his wife, Henuttawy, seated before piles of offerings. Offering scenes often include images of offering bearers bringing food, drink, and bouquets to the tomb owner and his wife. Others include images of banqueting and refer to the Valley Festival, a celebration of the dead during which families visited the tombs of their ancestors, and brought food and drink to nourish the tomb owners. Scenes of offerings, banqueting, and the Valley Festival served to emphasize Menna's desire to receive food and drink in the afterlife, and the intricate details encouraged visitors to stop by his tomb.

The short walls of the broad hall were also decorated. One was painted to look like a false door and a stela showing images of the tomb owner and his wife seated underneath funerary deities. Figures with their arms upraised in praise were painted around the false door accompanied by tables piled high with offerings.

The other short wall contains a painted image of Menna and Henuttawy standing before the god Osiris, who sits in a kiosk. Behind and below the couple are offering bearers bringing bouquets, oxen, and other offerings which they burn on two braziers.

=== Back Room/Long Hall ===
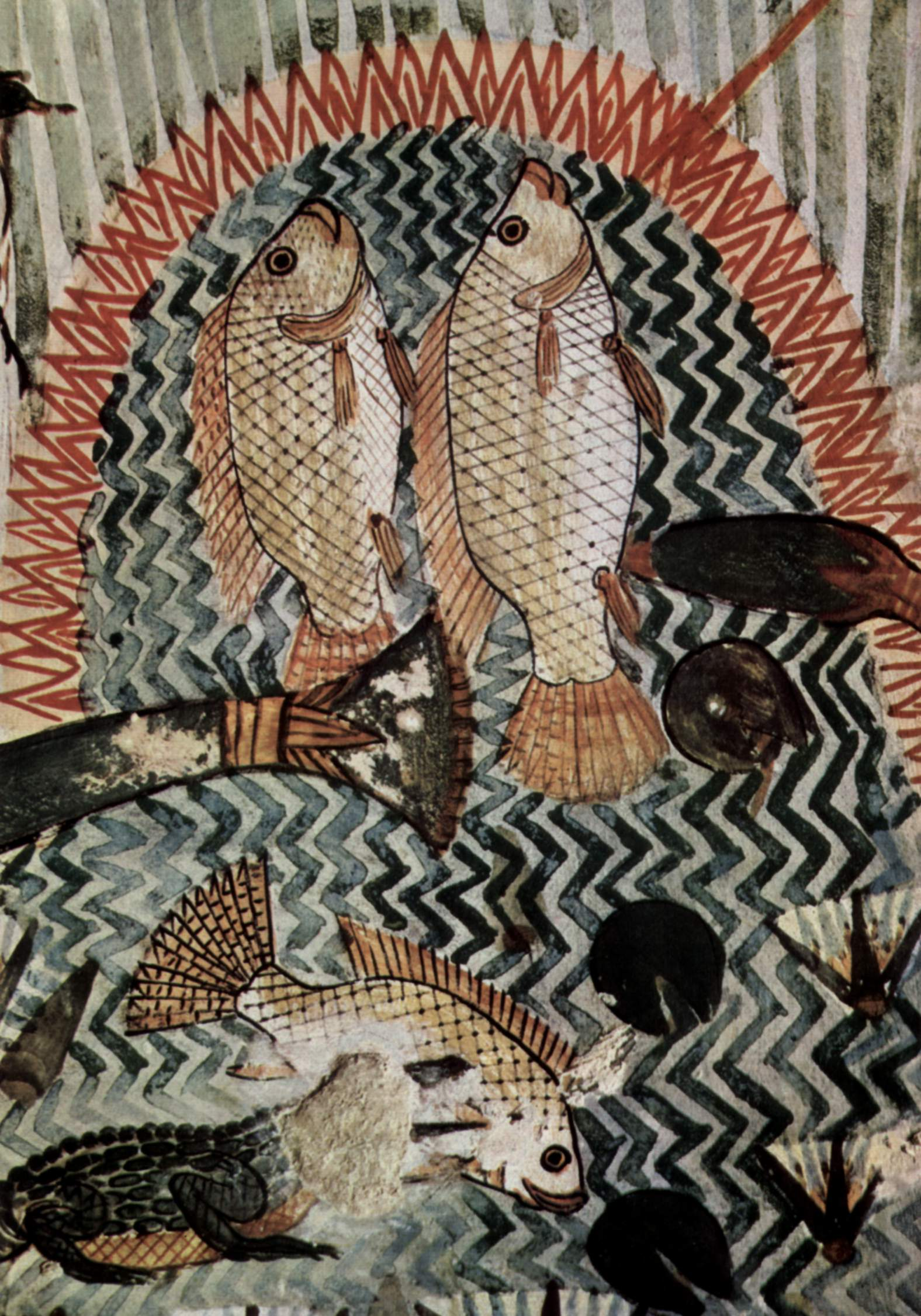
Detail of painting in the fishing and fowling scene

The back room of TT 69, also called the long hall, lies perpendicular to the broad hall. The decoration of this space focuses on Menna's transition from the world of the living into the world of the powerful ancestors. Scenes in the long hall show images of the funeral, including the dragging of the sarcophagus, the Voyage to Abydos, rites performed on the mummy of the tomb owner, and mourning women. These scenes do not depict Menna's actual funeral, and more likely represent an idealized funeral procession by combining actual ritual with more ancient practices. On the left hand wall, the funeral procession ends with depictions of the funerary deities Anubis and the Goddess of the West.

The decoration in the long hall also includes one of the earliest depictions of the Weighing of the Heart. This scene, which derives from vignettes of the Book of the Dead, depicts the tomb owner standing before a scale on which his heart, and therefore his deeds in life, are weighed against the concept of truth and justice, called ma’at in Egyptian. In Menna's tomb this concept is depicted as the goddess of truth and justice, Ma’at. She is shown as a seated woman with a feather on her head. (Other depictions of this scene may include only the feather, which is the spelling for the word ma’at.) The god Osiris presides over the ceremony, as Horus balances the scales, and Thoth records the results.

Menna's tomb also has a fishing and fowling scene in the long hall, which shows the tomb owner (depicted twice) spearing fish and hunting birds with a throw stick in the marshes. Menna's family accompanies him, dressed in their finest linen clothing and adorned with jewelry and flowers. The marsh itself is shown with a profusion of life including images of birds, fish, butterflies, a crocodile, and even a small cat who stalks a nest full of eggs.

Just as in the broad hall, there are many images of offering bearers bringing offerings to seated images of Menna and Henuttawy. On both walls of the long hall these offering bringers are oriented to look as if they are walking into the tomb, and therefore toward the central shrine where living visitors to the tomb would leave their offerings of food, drink, and flowers.

=== Shrine ===
At the end of the long hall is a small niche that once contained a gypsum plaster statue of Menna and his wife, Henuttawy. Only the legs and the feet of the small statue still remains. The wall around the niche is decorated and includes images of four offering bringers who hold trays of fruit, bread, beer, and bouquets towards the statue niche. When the tomb was in use, an offering table would have been placed before the niche to serve as the central location for ritual offerings made on behalf of the tomb owner and his wife. Since the shrine sits in the westernmost portion of the tomb, it was designed to serve as the place where the living and the dead could interact.

=== Damage ===
Images throughout TT 69 were damaged in antiquity with the eyes and faces of Menna and Henuttawy being a particular target. This suggests that Menna may have had an enemy who wished to destroy his memory after death. However, damage to Menna's name and the systematic removal of images of a type of priest called a sem-priest suggests that TT 69 fell victim to the Amarna period erasure of images related to the god Amun. Menna's name, which contains some of the same signs as the name of the god Amun, was also defaced.

== The Tomb Chapel of Menna Project ==
From 2007 to 2009 an interdisciplinary team of egyptologists, research scientists, conservators, worked in TT 69 to document and preserve the decoration of the tomb. This project was co-sponsored by Georgia State University and the Egyptian Antiquities Conservation Project (EAC) of the American Research Center in Egypt (ARCE). Funding was made available through the United States Agency for International Development (USAID).

The project included non-invasive techniques such as X-ray fluorescence (XRF), ultraviolet-visible spectroscopy, near infrared diffuse reflectance spectroscopy and Raman spectroscopy in order to determine what materials were used in the process of preparing, painting, and finishing the walls of the tomb. Conservation work was also carried out on TT 69 as part of the Tomb Chapel of Menna Project. The decoration of the tomb was cleaned, consolidated to prevent future flaking, and to fix older conservation attempts. The tomb's painted ceiling was also stabilized and barriers to prevent future damage were added to the tomb. Finally, high quality digital photographs were taken of the tomb, and digital line drawings of the painted scenes were created in order to document the well-preserved decoration.

== Gallery ==
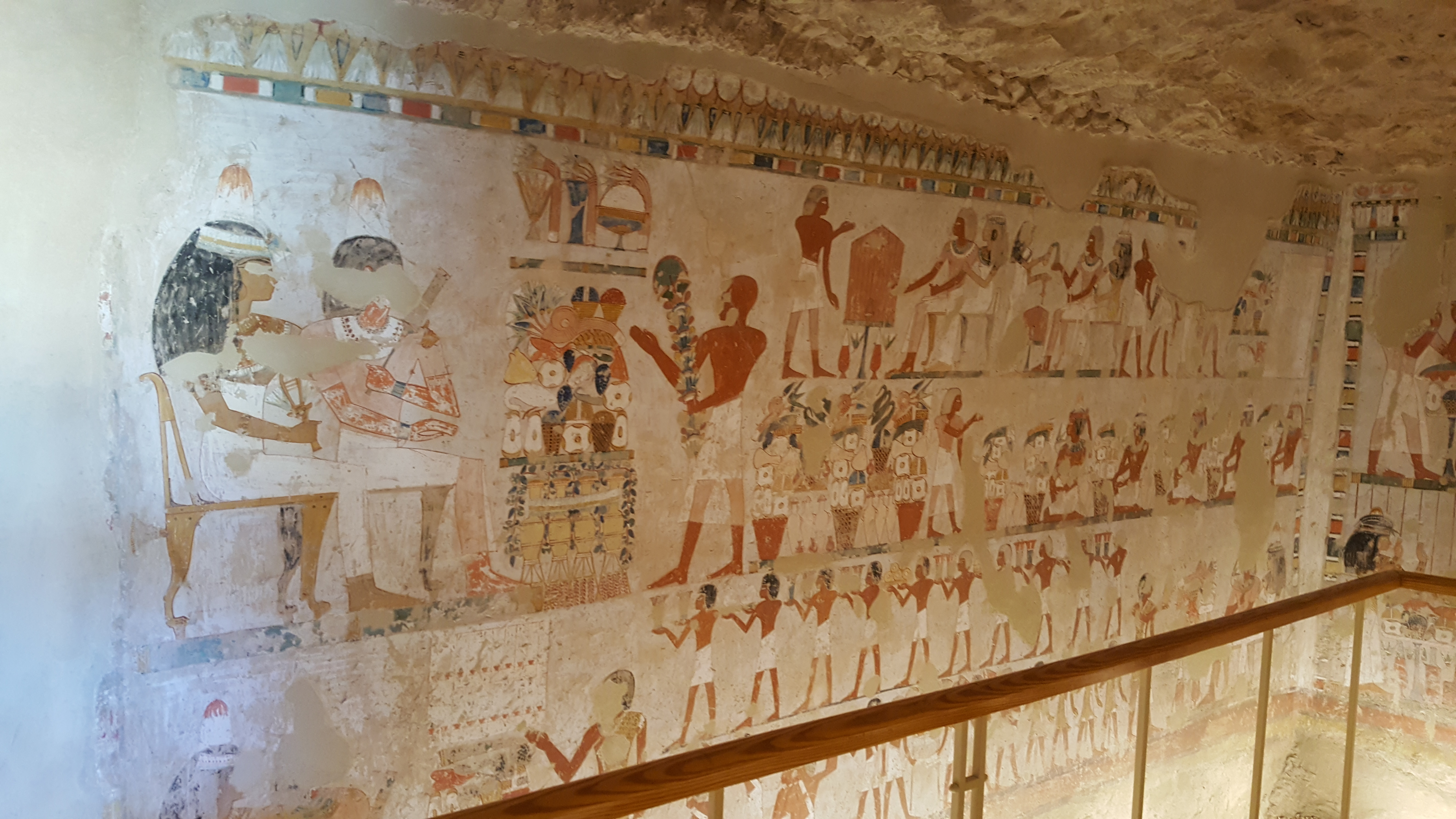
Menna and Henuttawy receiving offerings

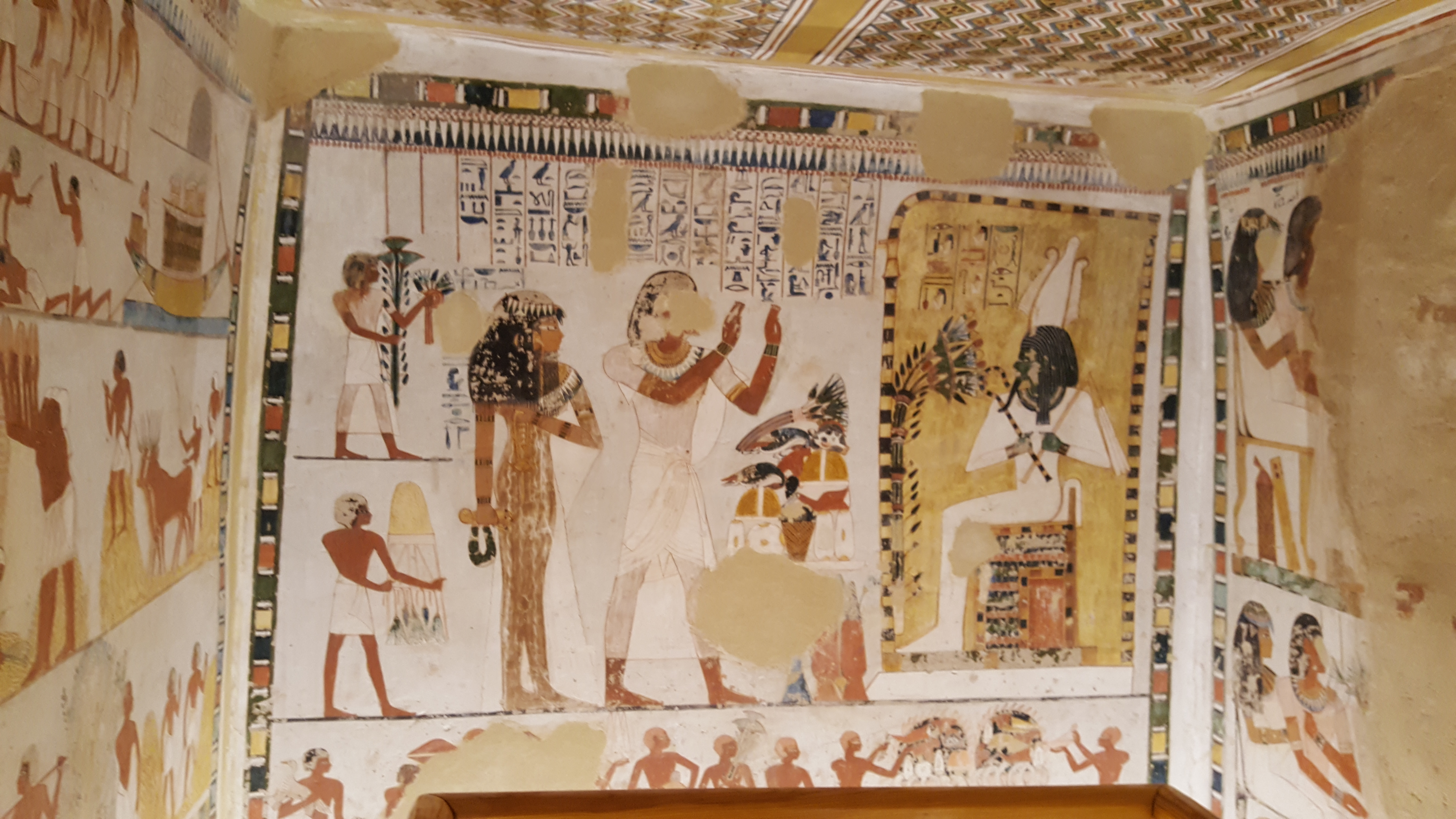
Menna and Henuttawy before Osiris, who is seated in a kiosk

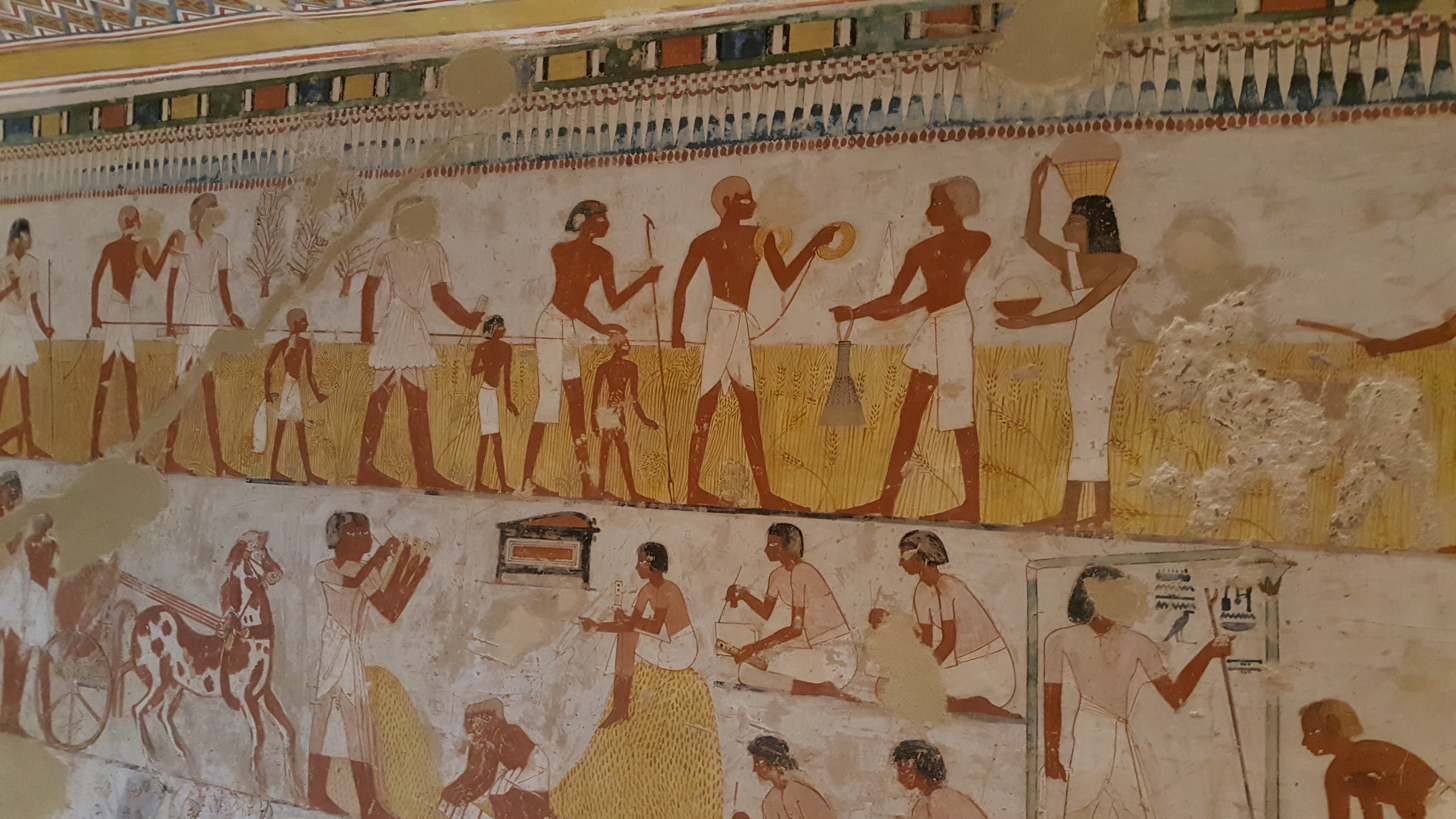
Agricultural scene depicting the harvesting of grain and scribes keeping count of it

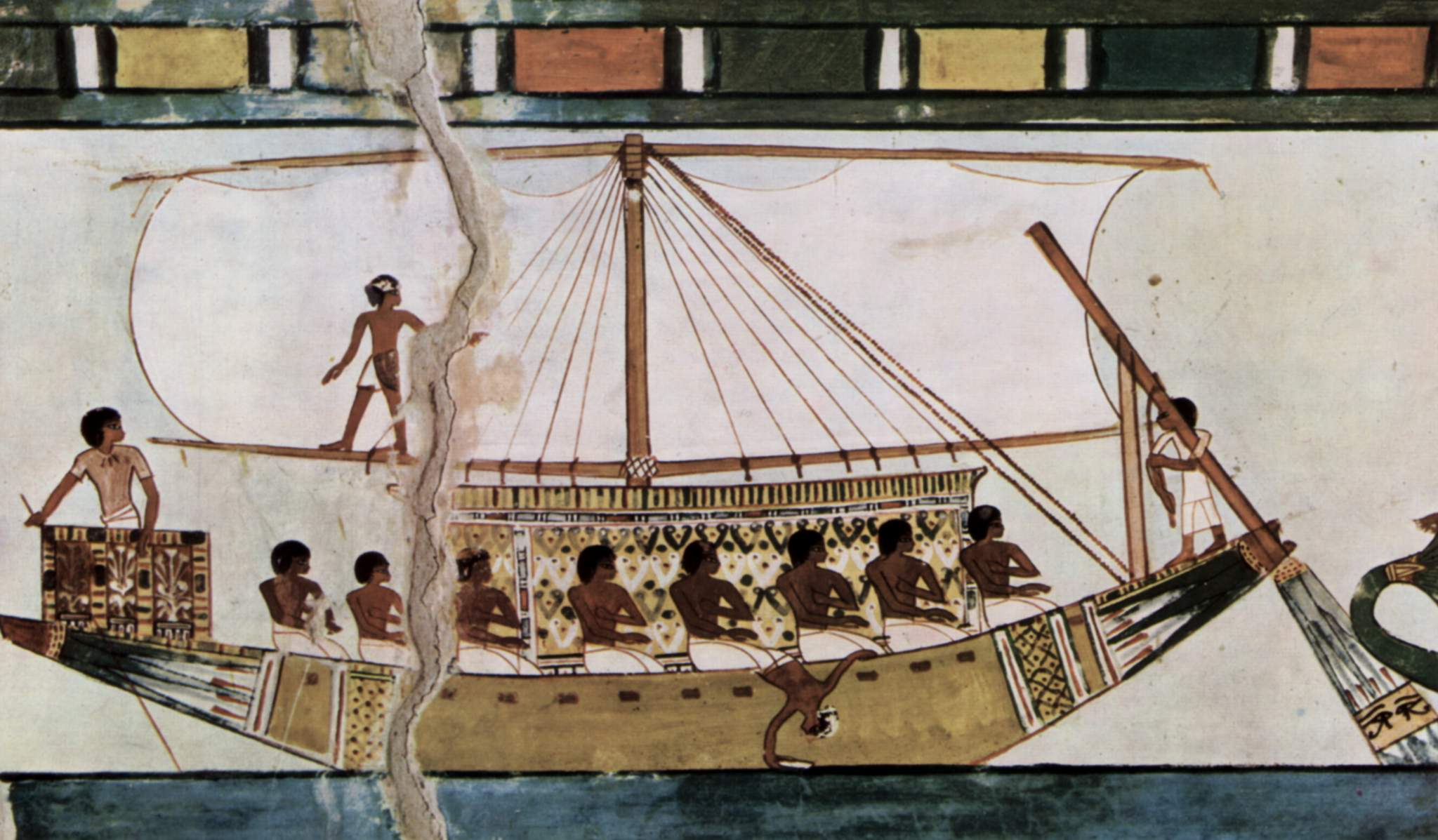
A depiction of a sailing funerary boat

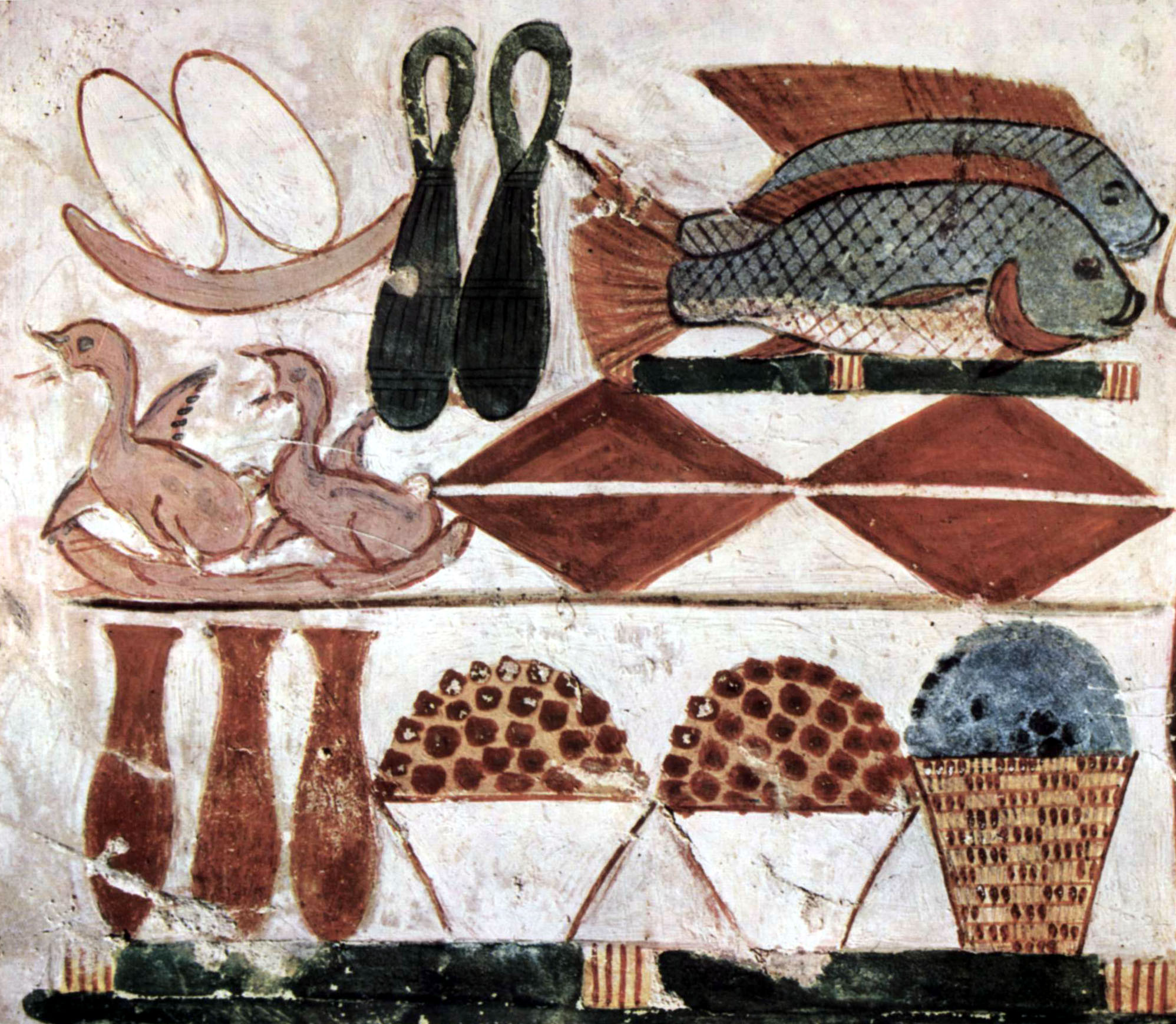
A depiction of offerings such as eggs, fish, ducklings, bread, beverages, and grapes

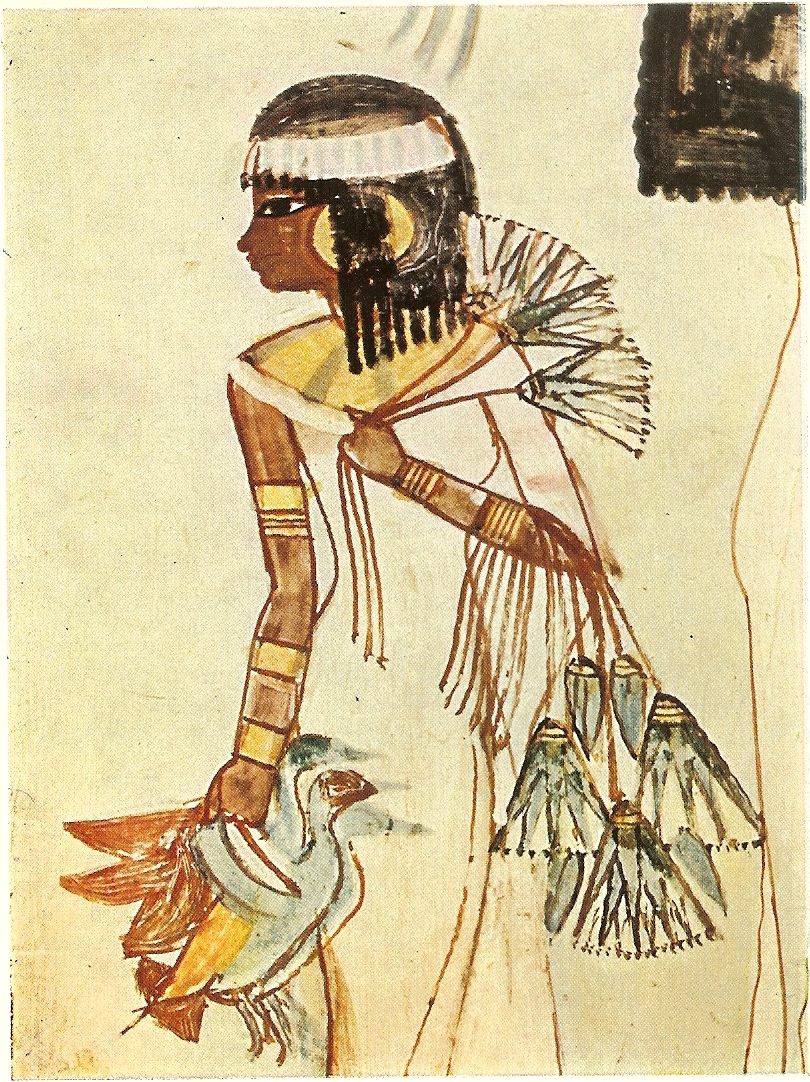
A painting of a girl holding several birds and bunches of lotus flowers

== See also ==
- List of Theban tombs
- N. de Garis Davies, Nina and Norman de Garis Davies, Egyptologists
