= TT67 =

Theban tomb

Coordinates: 25.7333°N 32.6000°E

Theban tomb TT67
- Burial site of Hapuseneb
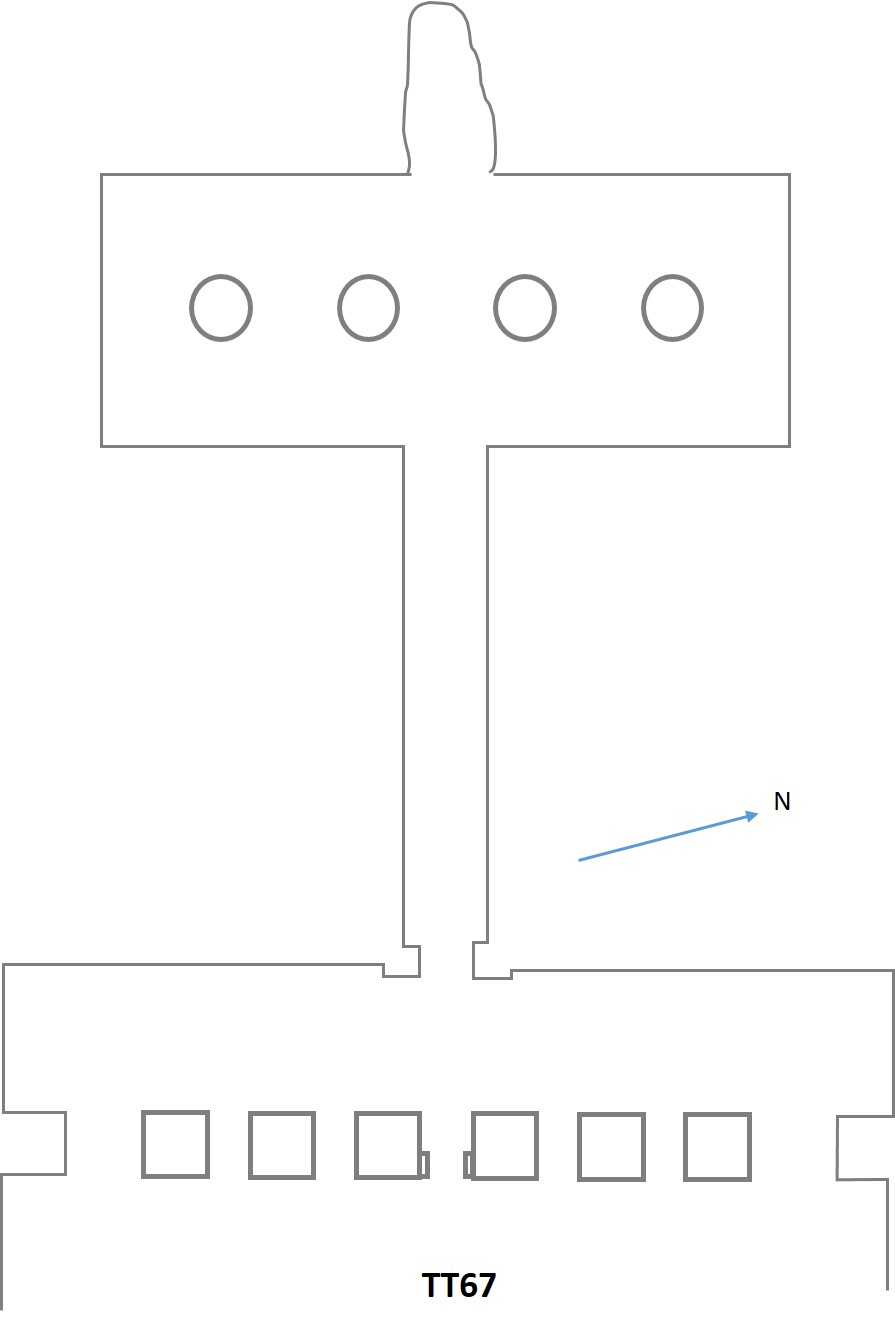

- Location within Egypt
- Location: Sheikh Abd el-Qurna, Theban Necropolis
- ← Previous; TT66 Next → TT68

Aa5 p w s n b
Hapuseneb
in hieroglyphs
Era: New Kingdom
(1550–1069 BC)

The Theban Tomb TT67 is located in Sheikh Abd el-Qurna. It forms part of the Theban Necropolis, situated on the west bank of the Nile opposite Luxor. The tomb is the burial place of the ancient Egyptian official Hapuseneb, who was High Priest of Amun during the New Kingdom reign of Hatshepsut.

In the passage of the tomb, Hapuseneb's parents are mentioned. His father Hepu was Third lector of Amun. His mother was called Ahhotep. Hapuseneb's wife Amenhotep is known from inscriptions in Gebel el-Silsila, but she is not mentioned in his tomb.

== See also ==
- List of Theban tombs
- N. de Garis Davies – Nina and Norman de Garis Davies, Egyptologists
