= TT51 =

Theban tomb

Coordinates: 25.7333°N 32.6000°E

Theban tomb TT51
- Burial site of Userhat called Neferhabef
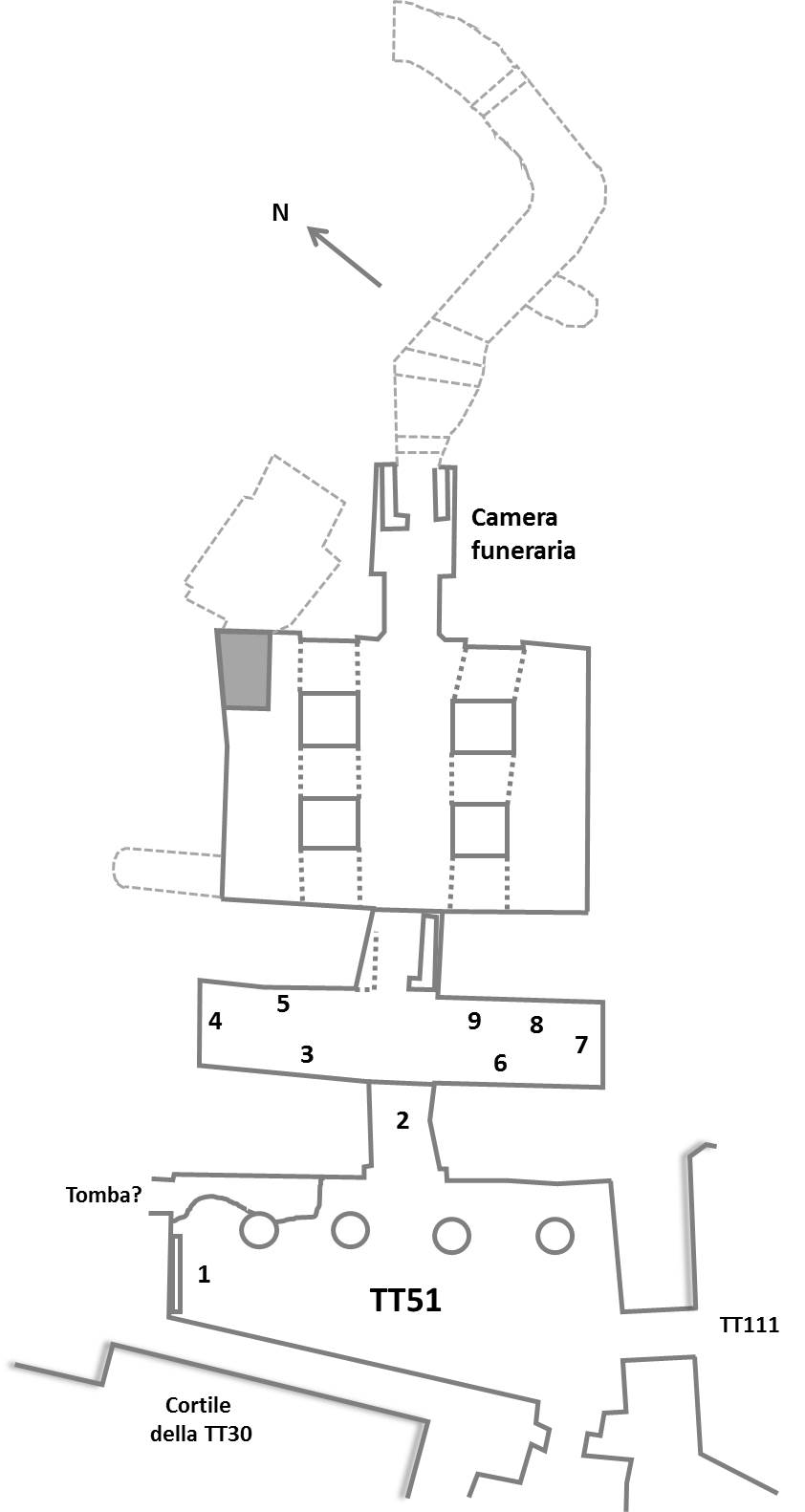

- Location within Egypt
- Location: Sheikh Abd el-Qurna, Theban Necropolis
- Discovered: Open in antiquity
- ← Previous; TT50 Next → TT52

F12 F4 t Z1 called F35 f W3 f
Userhat called Neferhabef
in hieroglyphs
Era: New Kingdom
(1550–1069 BC)

Theban Tomb TT51 is located in Sheikh Abd el-Qurna, part of the Theban Necropolis, on the west bank of the Nile, opposite to Luxor. It is the burial place of the ancient Egyptian official Userhat, who was First Prophet of Sethi I during the 19th Dynasty.

Userhet was the son of Khensemhab and the chantress of Montu, named Tausert. His wife was Hatshepsut called Shepset.

== The tomb ==
The court, passage and hall are decorated.

=== Court and passage ===
(1) A stela was recovered and remains of a scene showing funeral scenes with a ceremony before the mummy. Offering texts accompany the scenes.
(2) The passage shows Userhet with a hymn to the god Ra.

=== Hall ===
(3) Three registers with funerary scenes

- Userhet with Anubis and before scales and Ammit. Userhet kneeling before Osiris and the Western Goddess. Userhet, souls of Pe and Nekhen and baboons adore Ra-Harakhti as a hawk and Isis
- Funeral procession. The deceased is named Amenmose here. He appears before the pyramid-tomb.
- Chariots and stands of food, and Userhet's wife with her attendants in a scene with a temple.

(4) Two registers

- Three ancestors: The Vizier Imhotep, Hapuseneb and Khensemhab adore Monthu.
- Userhet and his wife beneath a vine.

(5) Three registers about a Festival procession of Thutmosis I

- Men bring supplies and Userhet adores the royal barque
- A royal statue is transported and shown on a barque on the lake.
- Userhet received funeral outfit with masks.

(6) Two registers

- A man named Akheperkaresoneb is shown kneeling, purified by eight priests. Userhat kneels before three Ogdoads. Thoth reports to Osiris and Anubis
- Userhet, Akheperkaresoneb and Nebmehyt dressed as priests and accompanied by three priestesses pour ointments on offerings before Montu and Meretseger.

(7) Userhat and his wife in a tree-goddess scene. Another (sub-)scene shows an Abydos pilgrimage, and Userhet and his wife before Osiris and Anubis.
(8) Priests libating, female mourners and offerings before Userhet and his wife.
(9)Two registers:

- Userhet offering before Osiris and two goddesses
- Userhet with mother-in-law(?) Hennutawy, his wife and daughter offering braziers to Thutmosis I and Ahmose-Nefertari.
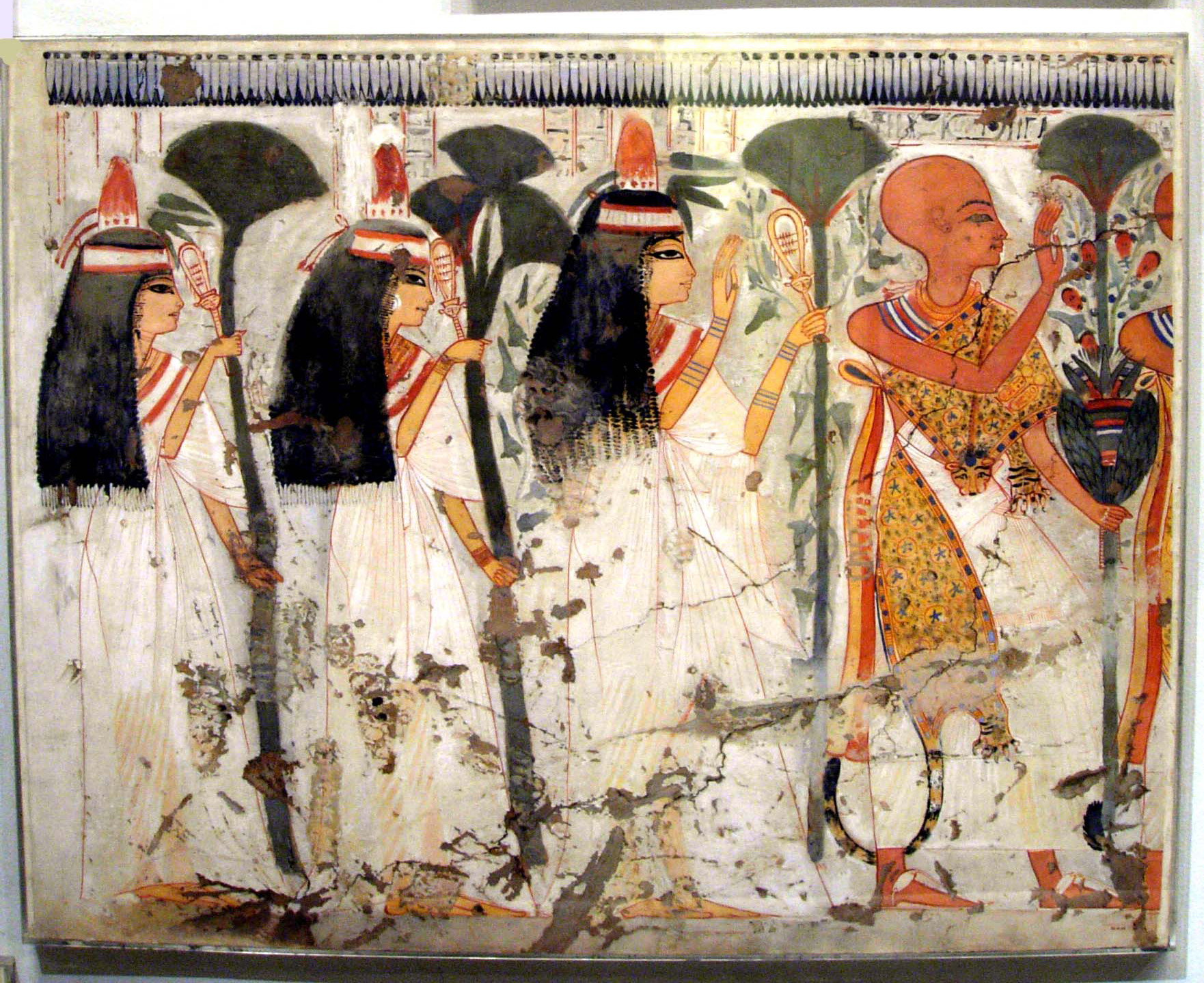
Procession of offerings

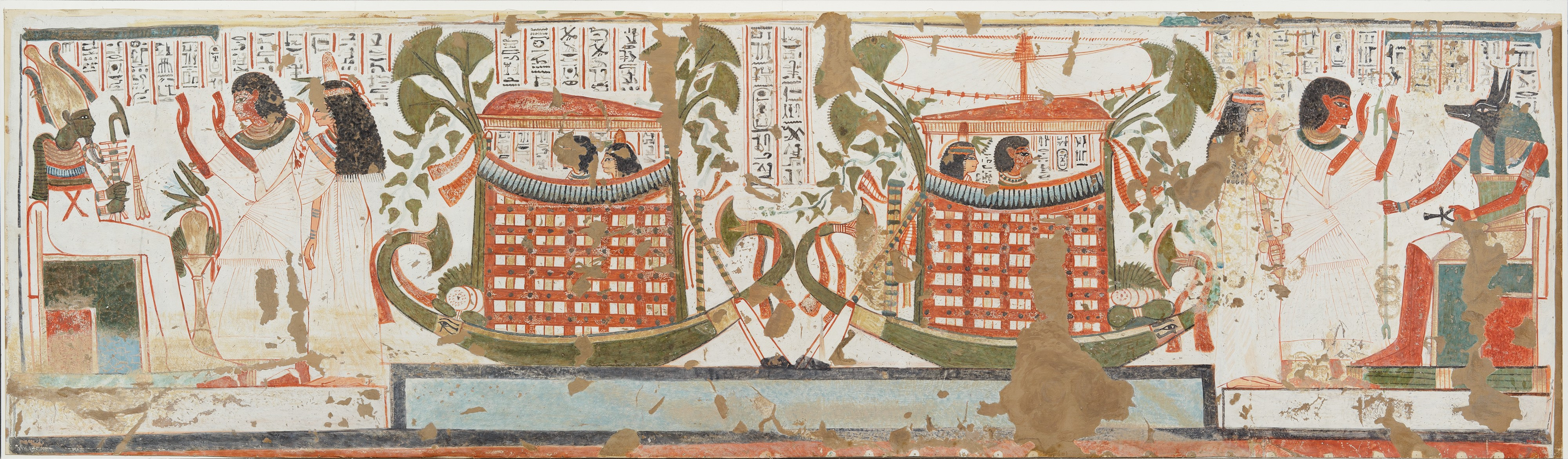
Userhat and Wife Visit Abydos

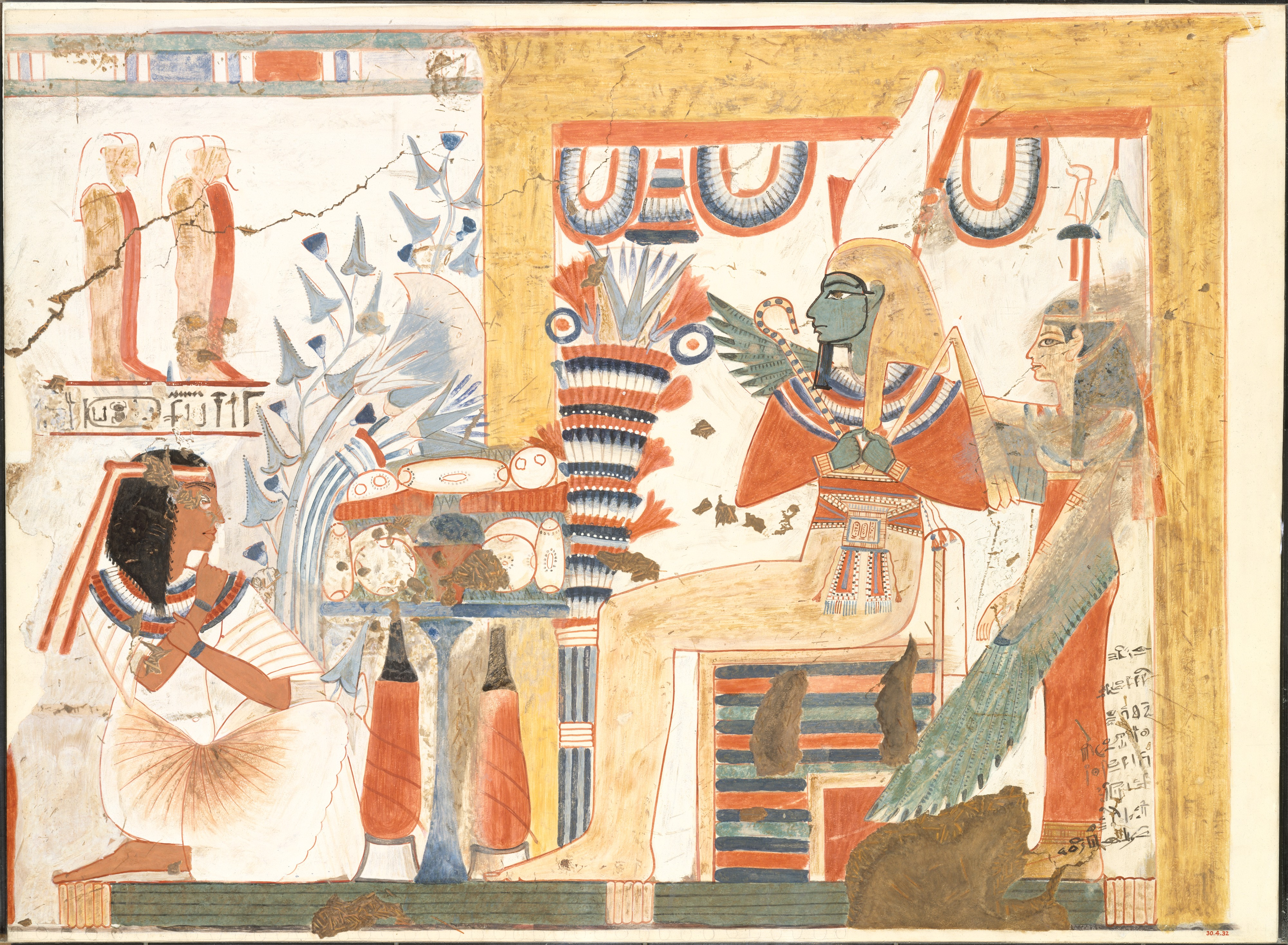
Userhat kneeling before Osiris and the Goddess of the West

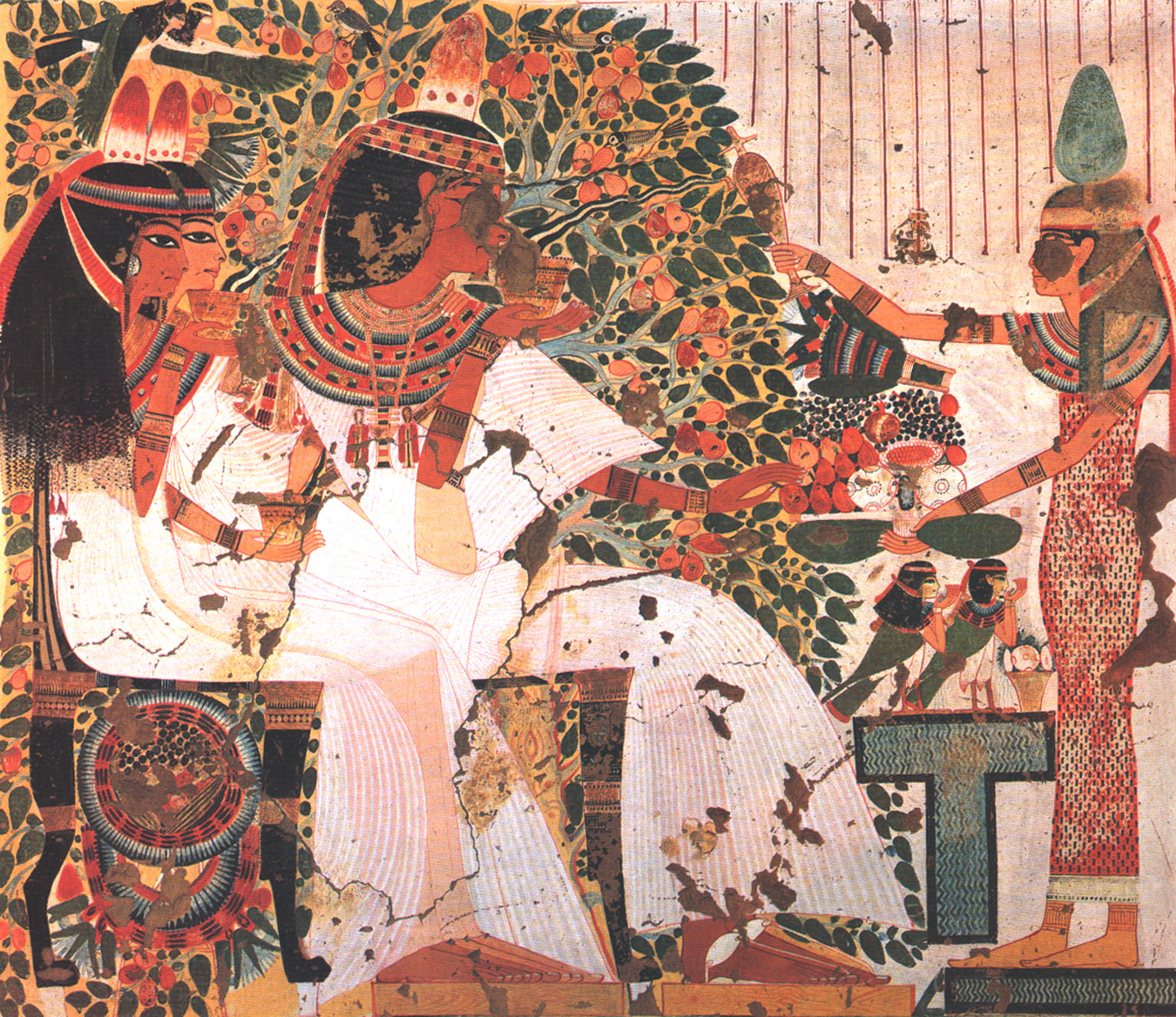
Userhat and his wife receiving offerings

== See also ==
- List of Theban tombs
