= Hapuseneb =

Egyptian High Priest of Amun

- High Priest of Amun
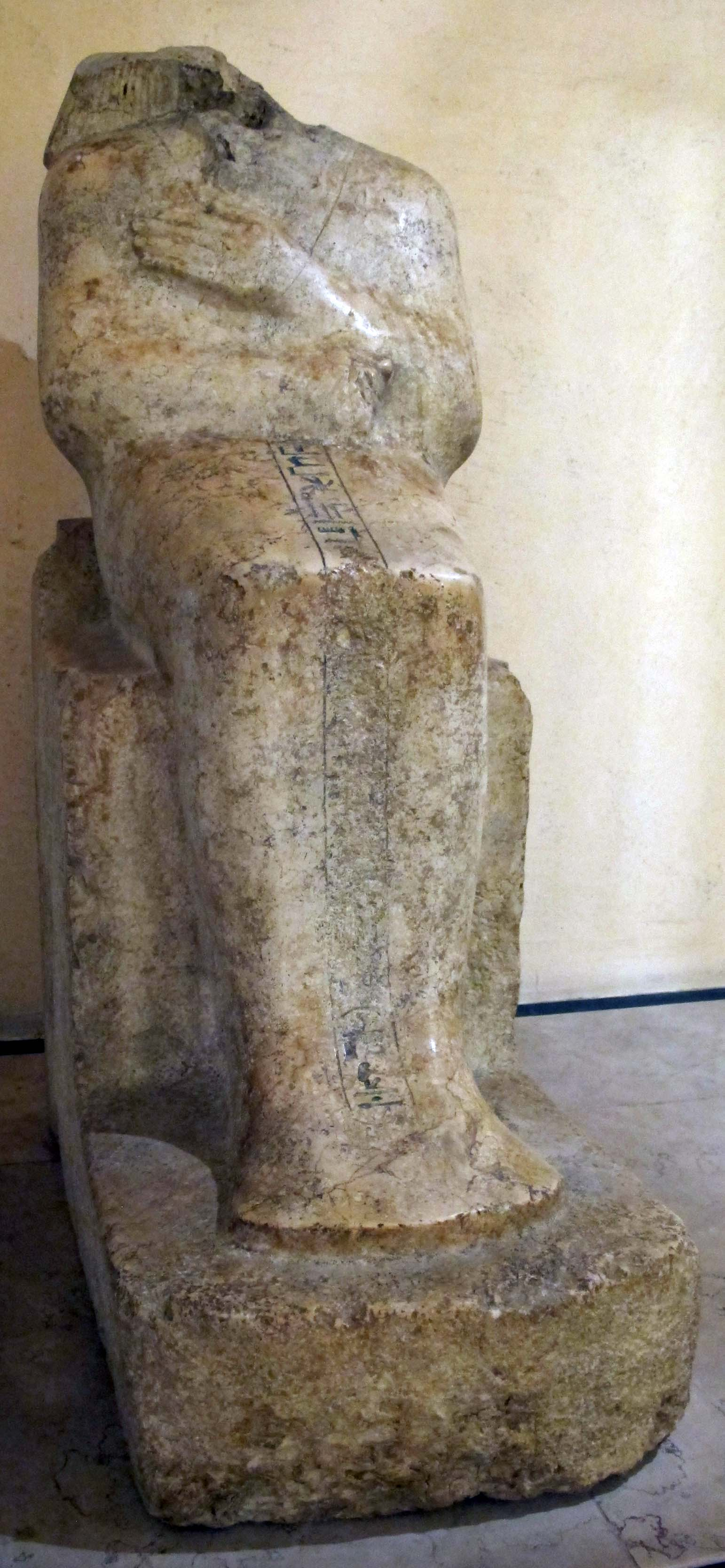
- Statue of Hapuseneb at Bologna.
- Dynasty: 18th Dynasty
- Pharaoh: Hatshepsut
- Father: Hapu
- Mother: Ahhotep
- Wife: Amenhotep
- Children: Sons: Djehutjmes-machet, User-pechtj, and Aa-cheper-ka-ra-nefer; Daughters: Henut, Henut-nefert, Sen-seneb, and Ta-em-resefu
- Burial: TT67 in Thebes

Hapuseneb was the High Priest of Amun during the reign of Hatshepsut.

== Biography ==
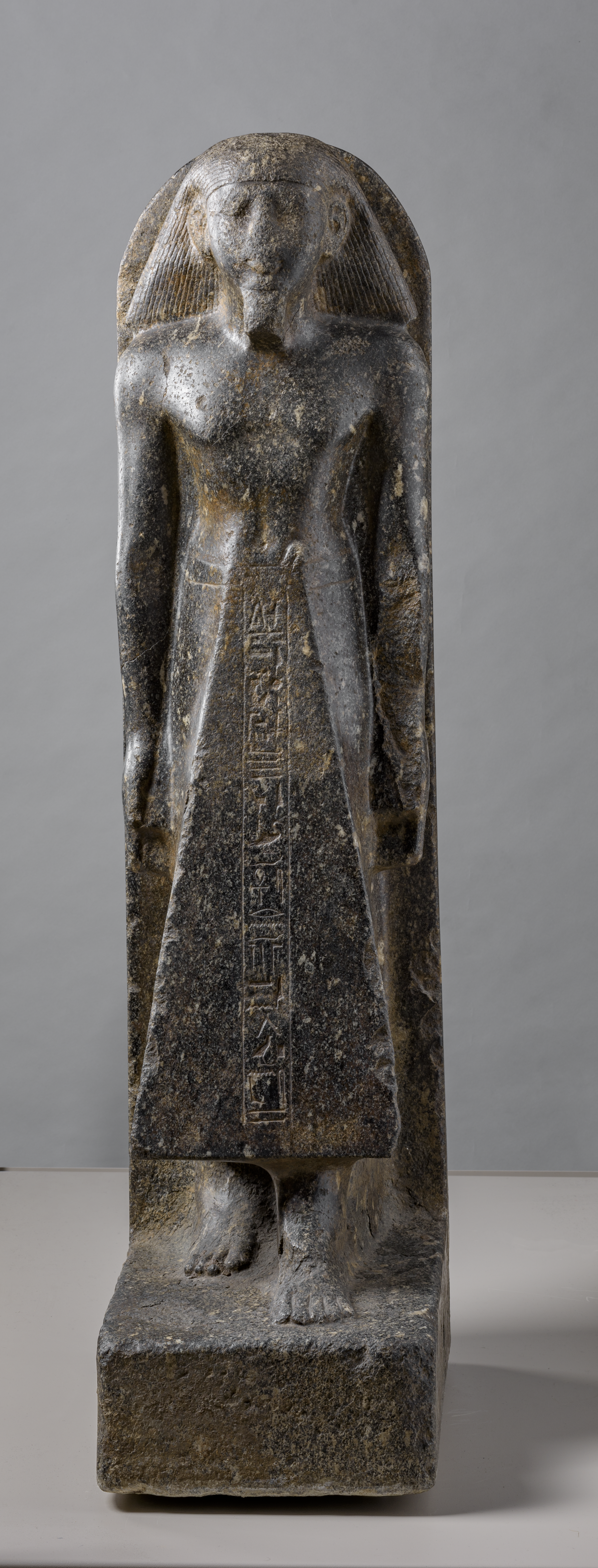
Statue of Hapu, Hapuseneb's father and third lector priest of Amon. Museo Egizio, Turin.

His mother, Ah-hotep, was a member of the royal harem; the name of the mother has survived on a piece of limestone found in the temple of Thutmose III at Qurna (Excavations of Weigall, 1906). His father, Hapu, was Lector Priest of Amun. His brother, Sa-Amun, was a scribe and 1st sealer of the god Amun. He also had a sister named Ahmose.

His wife Amenhotep bore him three sons Djehutjmes-machet, User-pechtj, and Aa-cheper-ka-ra-nefer (who was High Priest at the Mortuary Temple of Thutmose II, lector priest) and 4 daughters Henut, Henut-nefert (a singer of Amun), Sen-seneb, and Ta-em-resefu (also a singer of Amun).

Hapuseneb served as High Priest during Year 2 to Year 16 of Hatshepsut. He was buried in TT67 in Upper Egypt. Five funerary cones belonging to Hapuseneb are in the collection of the Metropolitan Museum. His titles are Hereditary Prince and Count, Treasurer of the King of Upper and Lower Egypt, First Prophet of Amun, Overseer of the Priest of Upper and Lower Egypt, and Overseer of All the Works of the King.

Only a few "monuments" of Hapuseneb have survived, his tomb TT67, shrine No.15 at Gebel el-Silsila, 3 funerary cones (Corpus-No. 21, 517, 518; see below), 4 statues (Louvre A134, Cairo CG 648, Bologna 1822, Cairo JE 39392), a canopic jar (Turin 3304), as well as one ostracon (MMA) and parts of the foundation deposits from the temple of Hatshepsut at Deir el-Bahari. Beyond that Hapuseneb is also mentioned on the statue of Hapu (Turin 3061), the statuette of the steward Amenemhab (Cairo CG 42112), and in an inscription in the tomb of Userhat; TT51, Sheikh Abd el-Qurna.
Due to the low number of documents it is hard to describe the course of his career with some certainty.
Among other things Hapuseneb, High Priest of Amun, was responsible for the building of a ship, a gate, a shrine, for the production of temple equipment, door wings and buildings - and he was the "Overseer of the construction of a royal tomb" but it is not clear whether he was responsible for KV20 or the rock tomb of Hatshepsut.

Hapuseneb was the first HPA to also hold the title of Overseer of the hem priests of Upper and Lower Egypt. The second Priest of Amun Puyemre was related to Hapuseneb through marriage: he was married to Hapuseneb’s daughter Seniseneb. Seniseneb was a divine adoratrice of Amun and a temple singer.
