= TT68 =

Theban tomb

Theban tomb TT68
- Burial site of Meryptah, Paenkhemenu, Nespaneferhor and Hor
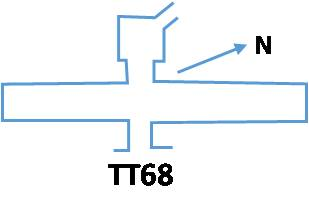

- Location within Egypt
- Location: Sheikh Abd el-Qurna, Theban Necropolis
- ← Previous; TT67 Next → TT69

The Theban Tomb TT68 is located in Sheikh Abd el-Qurna, part of the Theban Necropolis, on the west bank of the Nile, opposite to Luxor. The tomb was initially started for the High Priest of Amun Meryptah, during the 18th Dynasty. The tomb was later built over by Paenkhemenu during the 20th Dynasty. During the 21st Dynasty the tomb was again usurped by Nespaneferhor and his son Hor.

== Tomb ==
The tomb was begun for the High Priest of Amun Meryptah, during the reign of Amenhotep III and Akhenaten. Not much remains from this period. The tomb had a mudbrick porch which likely featured a small pyramid. The porch was built over even earlier structures in the court of tomb TT227, which dates to an even earlier period.

During the Twentieth Dynasty, the tomb was usurped by Paenkhemenu, who was a wab-priest of Amun at Karnak, and a wab-priest of Mut of Asher. He likely dates from some time during the Twentieth Dynasty. Seyfried suggests that he may date from the time of Ramesses III. Most of the decoration was added to the tomb during this period.

V22 O34 G40 nfr D2 Z1
Nespaneferhor
in hieroglyphs
Era: New Kingdom
(1550–1069 BC)

The tomb was later usurped by a man named Nespaneferhor, who was a Head of the Temple scribed of Amun from the reign of Siamun during the Twenty-first Dynasty. Nespaneferhor was the son of a man named Iufenamun. His wife is called Tabekenmut, who is a singer in the cult of the goddess Mut. The scenes show the deceased adoring divine barques and a variety of deities including Re-Horakhty, Osiris, Isis, and Nephtys. There is also a scene of Nespaneferhor's son Hor offering to his father. The ceiling still shows a hymn to Osiris and the original owner's name (partial) and titles remain.

A scene depicting Nespaneferhor and his wife worshipping scared cows appears on the south-east wall. Three sacred cows appear in enclosures. All three cows appear with disks on their head, and the one on the bottom of the scene seems to have additional atef feathers. The scene is only roughly sketched in yellow on a white background. The cattle stalls appear to be elaborate.

The tomb was finally usurped by Hor, who was buried there. This is based on fragments of cartonnage bearing the name of Hor being found in the tomb.

== See also ==
- List of Theban tombs
