= Hepu (vizier) =

Ancient Egyptian vizier

- Vizier of the South
Egyptian name
Aa5 p w
- Dynasty: 18th Dynasty
- Pharaoh: Tuthmosis IV
- Burial: Thebes TT66
- Spouse: Rennai

Hepu was a vizier of ancient Egypt. He served during the reign of Thutmose IV.

== Family ==
Hepu's wife is named Rennai. A son is shown in TT66 offering to Hepu and Rennai.

== Tomb ==
Hepu was buried in TT66 in Abd el Qurna in Thebes. The hall contains several scenes and one of them is a text of Hepu's installation as vizier before Thutmose IV. Another scene depicts the royal workshop with a statue of the King presenting a Djed pillar.
