= TT49 =

Theban tomb

Coordinates: 25.7333°N 32.6000°E

Theban tomb TT49
- Burial site of Neferhotep
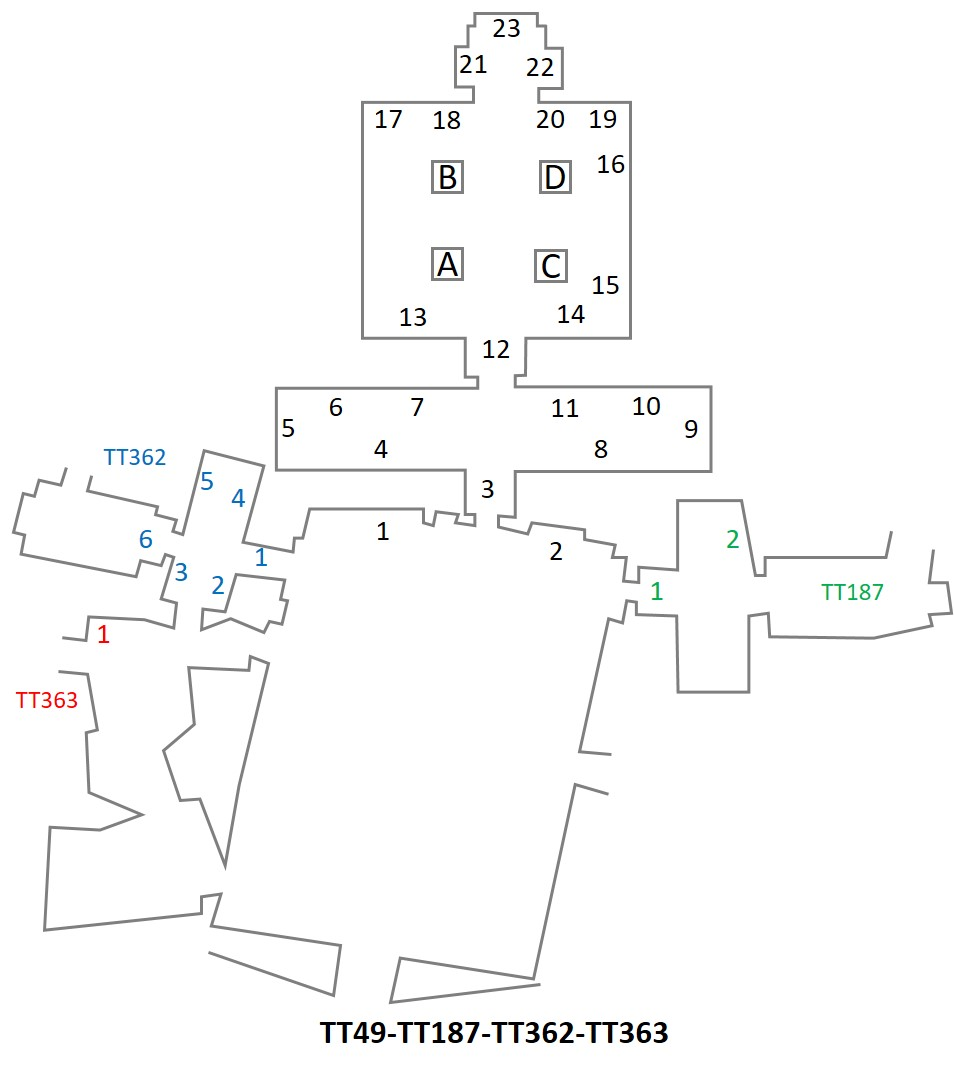

- Location within Egypt
- Location: El-Khokha, Theban Necropolis
- ← Previous; TT48 Next → TT50

nfr Y1 t p
Neferhotep
in hieroglyphs
Era: New Kingdom
(1550–1069 BC)

The Theban Tomb TT49 is located in El-Khokha. It forms part of the Theban Necropolis, situated on the west bank of the Nile opposite Luxor. TT49 was the burial place of the ancient Egyptian official Neferhotep, who was a Chief Scribe of Amun. Neferhotep lived during the reign of Tutankhamen, Ay and Horemheb, at the end of the Eighteenth Dynasty of Egypt. He was a son of Neby, who was a servant of Amun and the lady Iuy. His wife was named Merytre

== Tomb ==
The tomb of Neferhotep is situated off a courtyard, which also contains the entrances to the tombs of Pakhihet (TT187), Pa-anemwaset (TT362), Paraemheb (TT363) which all date to the end of the 19th Dynasty. In the courtyard two stela flanked the entrance to the tomb. The entrance leads into a hall which connects via a doorway to a pillared hall which contains four pillars. At the back of the pillared hall a niche contains seated statues of Neferhotep and his wife.

== See also ==
- List of Theban tombs
