= TT50 =

Theban tomb

Coordinates: 25.7333°N 32.6000°E

Theban tomb TT50
- Burial site of Neferhotep
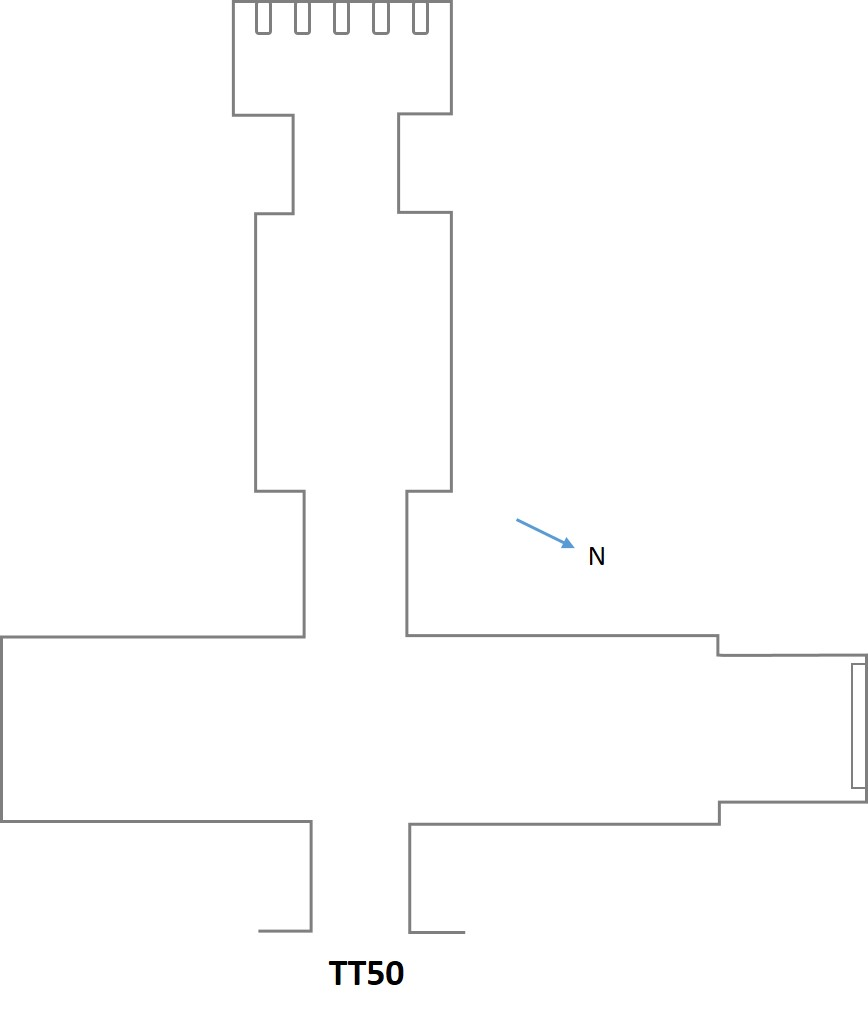

- Location within Egypt
- Location: Sheikh Abd el-Qurna, Theban Necropolis
- Discovered: Open in antiquity
- ← Previous; TT49 Next → TT51

nfr Y1 t p
Neferhotep
in hieroglyphs
Era: New Kingdom
(1550–1069 BC)

The Theban Tomb TT50 is located in Sheikh Abd el-Qurna, part of the Theban Necropolis, on the west bank of the Nile, opposite to Luxor. It is the burial place of the ancient Egyptian official Neferhotep, who was a Divine father (or God's father) of Amun-re during the reign of Horemheb of the 18th Dynasty.

A scene dated to year 3 of Pharaoh Horemheb describes how the king – after making a procession from the House of Gold – appeared in his palace and summoned the God's father Neferhotep to come before him. Neferhotep is showered with gifts including silver, gold, ointment, clothing, bread, beer, meat and cakes. The king is accompanied by the overseer of the treasury Maya, two viziers and his chamberlain and royal butler. Neferhotep and his brother Parennefer are congratulated by their father Amenemonet.

Several family members are mentioned in TT50. Neferhotep is the son of Amenemonet, who was a Divine Father of Amun, and Takhat, who served as Chief of the harem of Amun. Neferhotep appears with his brother Parennefer who was also a God's father and a brother named Khons-hotep who was a wab-priest of Amun. Neferhotep's daughter Rennut is shown holding fruit and flowers. Neferhotep's son Pairy is mentioned in the tomb as well. He served as a scribe of Truth in Southern Heliopolis (i.e. Thebes). A scene depicting ancestor offerings is damaged, but the text mentions Neferhotep's grandfather Ahmose who was a seal-bearer.

== See also ==
- List of Theban tombs
