= Ay (pharaoh) =

Egyptian pharaoh of the late 18th Dynasty (14th century BCE)

- Ay II, Aya
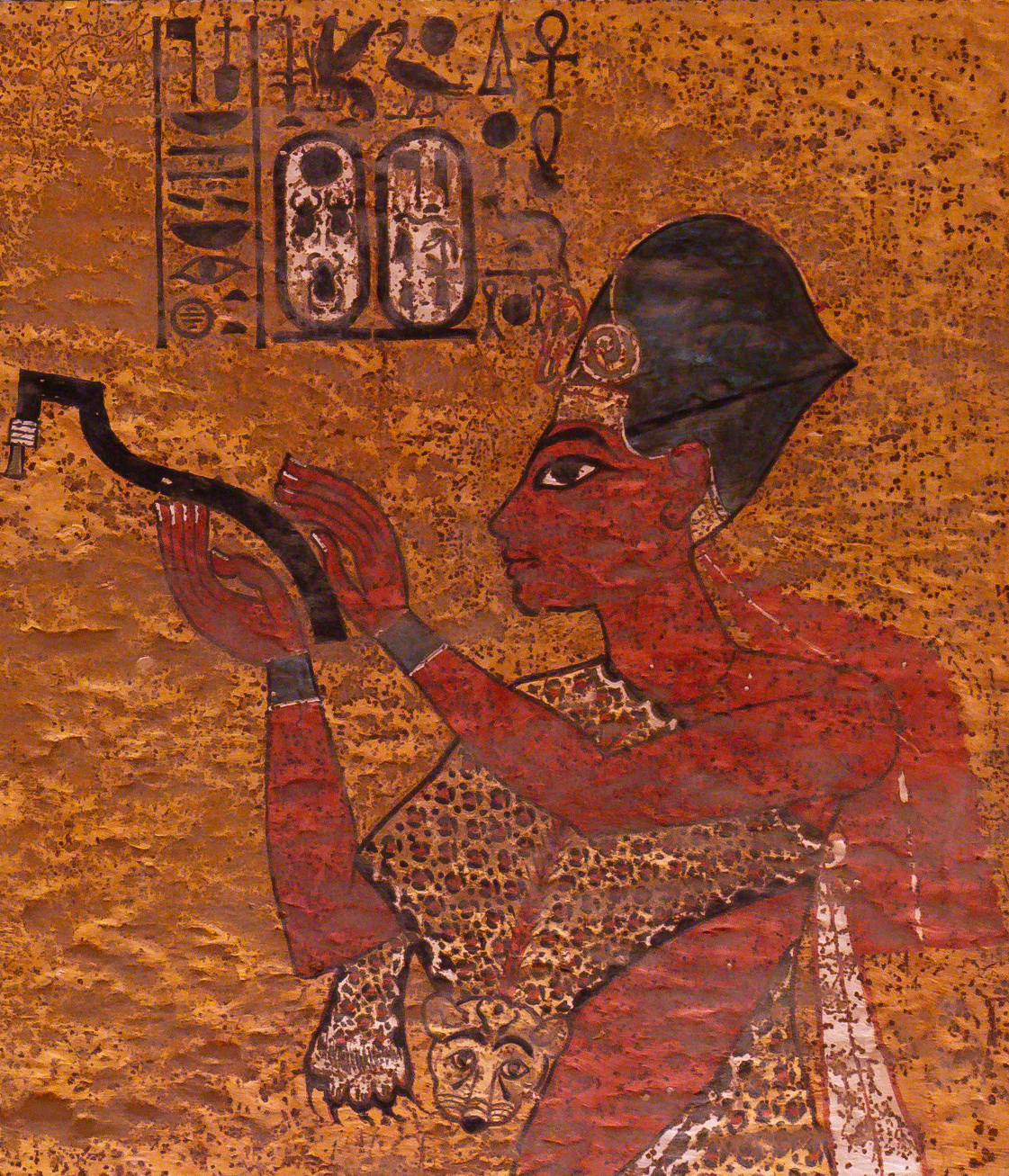
- Pharaoh Ay depicted in KV62 performing the Opening of the mouth ceremony on his predecessor Tutankhamun.

Pharaoh
- Reign: 1323–1319 BC or 1327–1323 BC
- Predecessor: Tutankhamun
- Successor: Horemheb
Royal titulary
Horus name
Kanakht Tekhenkhau
The strong bull, the one of glittering crowns
G5	E1 D40 S15 xa Z2
Nebty name
Sekhempehti dersetet
Who is mighty of strength, who subdues the Asiatics
G16	sxm F9 F9 d r D40 S22 t t N25
Golden Horus
Heqamaat sekhepertawy
The ruler of truth, who creates the two lands
G8	HqA q mAat s xpr r tA tA
Prenomen
Kheperkheperure–Irimaat
Everlasting are the Manifestations of Re,
who does what is right

M23 X1 L2 X1	N5 L1 L1 Z3 D4 Aa11 t
Nomen
Itinetjer Ay
Divine father, Ay

G39 N5	nTr i t f i A2 i i
- Consorts: Iuy (uncertain), Tey, Ankhesenamun (probably)
- Children: Nakhtmin?, Nefertiti?, Mutbenret/Mutnedjmet?
- Died: 1319 BC or 1323 BC
- Burial: WV23
- Monuments: Amarna Tomb; Mortuary Temple of Ay and Horemheb
- Religion: Atenism; Ancient Egyptian religion
- Dynasty: 18th Dynasty

Kheperkheperure Ay, sometimes known as simply Ay, was the penultimate pharaoh of ancient Egypt's 18th Dynasty. He reigned for about four years in the late 14th century BC. Before becoming king, he was a prominent official and close advisor during the late 18th Dynasty. Following Tutankhamun's death, Ay succeeded him as pharaoh. His prenomen Kheperkheperure means "Everlasting are the Manifestations of Ra", while his nomen Ay it-netjer reads as "Ay, Father of the God". His successor, Horemheb, later erased and usurped monuments associated with Ay, part of a campaign of damnatio memoriae against him and the other pharaohs associated with the Amarna Period.

== Origins and family ==
Ay is believed to have been from Akhmim. During his short reign, he built a rock-cut chapel in Akhmim and dedicated it to the local deity Min. He may have been the son of the courtier Yuya and his wife Thuya, making him a brother of Tiye and Anen. This connection is based on the fact that both Yuya and Ay came from Akhmim and held the titles 'God's Father' and 'Master of Horses'. A strong physical resemblance has been noted between the mummy of Yuya and surviving statuary depictions of Ay. The mummy of Ay has not been located, although fragmentary skeletal remains recovered from his tomb may represent it, so a more thorough comparison with Yuya cannot be made. Therefore, the theory that he was the son of Yuya rests entirely on circumstantial evidence.

Ay's Great Royal Wife was Tey, who was known to be the wet-nurse to Nefertiti. It is often theorised that he was the father of Nefertiti as a way to explain his title 'God's Father' as it has been argued that the term designates a man whose daughter married the king. However, nowhere are Ay and Tey referred to as the parents of Nefertiti.

Nakhtmin, Ay's chosen successor, was likely his son or grandson. Nakhtmin's mother was Iuy, a priestess of Min and Isis in Akhmim. She may have been Ay's first wife.

== Career ==
Ay
- Vizier of the South
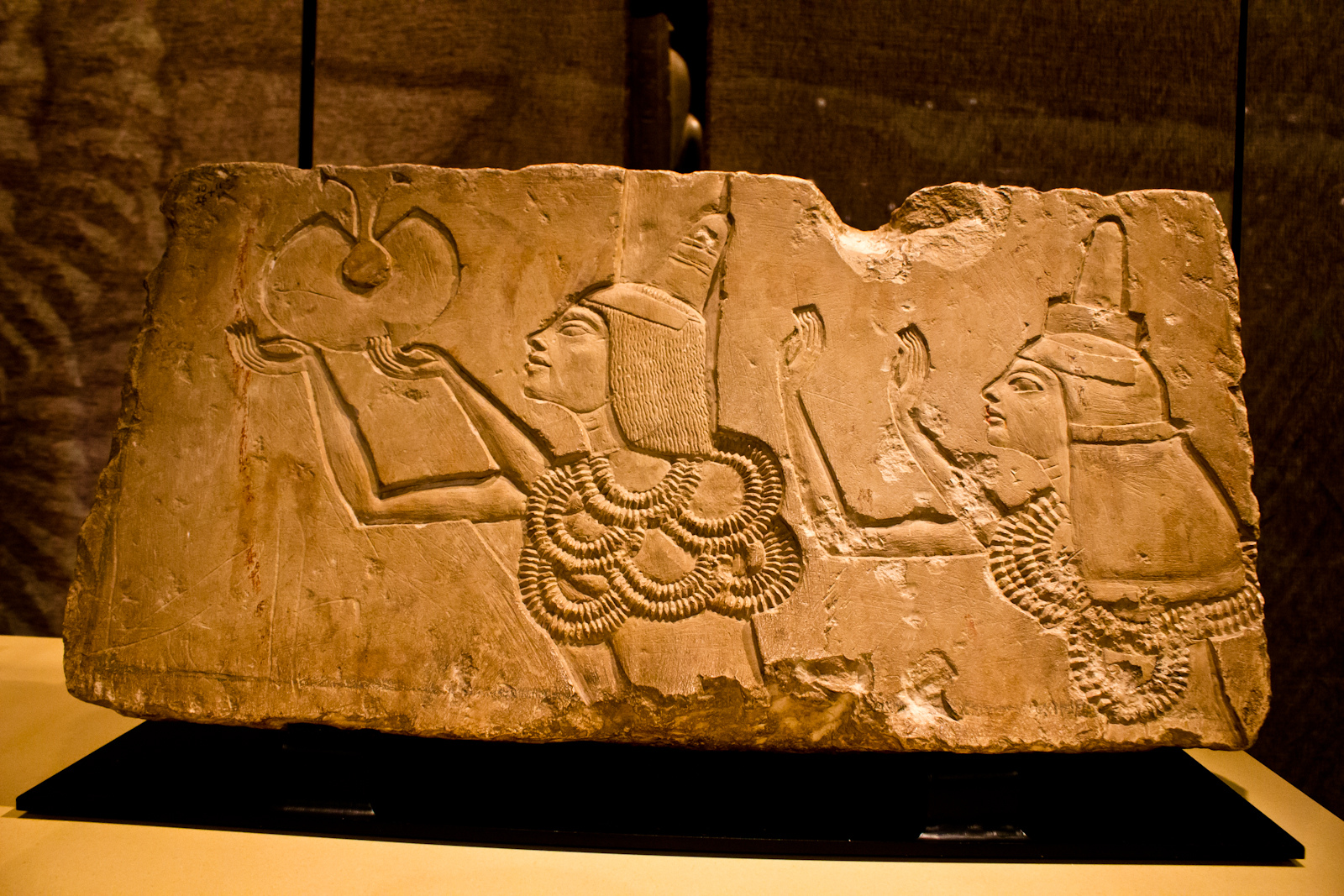
- A stone block shows Ay receiving the "Gold of Honor" award in his Amarna tomb from Akhenaten.
- Dynasty: 18th Dynasty
- Pharaoh: Akhenaten to Tutankhamun

Ay served as vizier to at least two pharaohs, Akhenaten, and Tutankhamun. He may have also served as vizier to the pharaohs reigning in-between those two, Smenkhare and Neferneferuaten.

=== Reign of Akhenaten ===
All that is known for certain was that by the time he was permitted to build a tomb for himself (Southern Tomb 25) at Amarna during the reign of Akhenaten, he had achieved the title of "Overseer of All the Horses of His Majesty", the highest rank in the elite charioteering division of the army, which was just below the rank of General. Prior to this promotion he appears to have been first a Troop Commander and then a "regular" Overseer of Horses, titles which were found on a box thought to have been part of the original furnishings for his tomb. Other titles listed in this tomb include Fan-bearer on the Right Side of the King, Acting Scribe of the King, beloved by him, and God's Father. The 'Fan-bearer on the Right Side of the King' was a very important position, and is viewed as showing that the bearer had the 'ear' of the ruler. The final God's Father title is the one most associated with Ay, and was later incorporated into his royal name when he became pharaoh.

This title could mean that he was the father-in-law of the pharaoh, suggesting that he was the son of Yuya and Thuya, thus being a brother or half-brother of Tiye, brother-in-law to Amenhotep III and the maternal uncle of Akhenaten. Instead, the title may indicate that Ay was the tutor of Tutankhamun. If Ay was the son of Yuya, who was a senior military officer during the reign of Amenhotep III, then he likely followed in his father's footsteps, finally inheriting his father's military functions upon his death. Alternatively, it could also mean that he may have had a daughter who married the pharaoh Akhenaten, possibly being the father of Akhenaten's chief wife Nefertiti. Ultimately there is no evidence to definitively prove either hypothesis. The two theories are not mutually exclusive, but either relationship would explain the exalted status to which Ay rose during Akhenaten's Amarna interlude, when the royal family turned their backs on Egypt's traditional gods and experimented, for a dozen years or so, with an early form of monotheism; an experiment that, whether out of conviction or convenience, Ay appears to have followed under the reign of Akhenaten.

The Great Hymn to the Aten is also found in his Amarna tomb which was built during his service under Akhenaten. His wife Tey was born a commoner but was given the title Nurse of the Pharaoh's Great Wife. If she were the mother of Nefertiti she would be expected to have the royal title Mother of the Pharaoh's Great Wife instead; had Ay been the father of Nefertiti, then Tey would have been her stepmother. In several Amarna tomb chapels there is a woman whose name begins with "Mut" who had the title Sister of the Pharaoh's Great Wife. This could also be a daughter of Ay's by his wife Tey, and it is known that his successor Horemheb married a woman with the name Mutnodjimet.

=== Reign of Smenkhare ===
There is no explicit evidence to confirm that Ay was the vizier during the reign of pharaoh Smenkhare.

=== Reign of Neferneferuaten ===
It is generally thought that Queen Neferneferuaten ruled independently after the death of Smenkhare. There is no explicit evidence to confirm that Ay was a vizier during the reign of pharaoh Neferneferuaten.

=== Reign of Tutankhamun ===
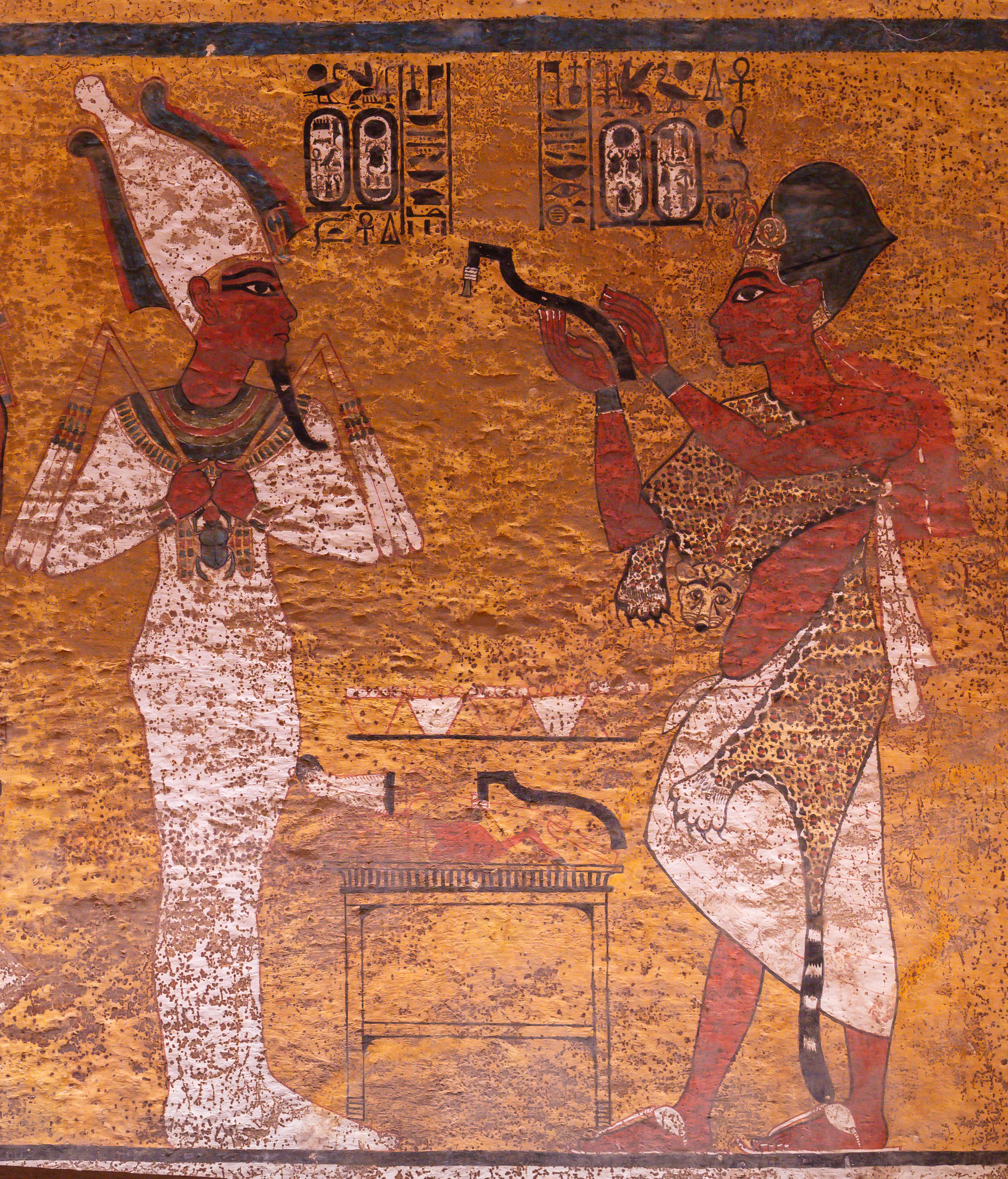
Ay performing the opening of the mouth ceremony for Tutankhamun, scene from Tutankhamun's tomb (KV62). Ay is wearing the leopard skin worn by Egyptian High Priests and a Khepresh, a blue crown worn by Pharaohs.

Tutankhamun's reign is most notably marked by the restoration of the original ancient Egyptian religion. This included the revival of traditional cults, the repair of monuments damaged during Akhenaten's reign, and commissioning of new Amun statues.

Egyptologist Bob Brier suggested that Ay murdered Tutankhamun in order to usurp the throne, a claim which was based on X-ray examinations of the body done in 1968. He also alleged that Ankhesenamun and the Hittite prince she was about to marry were also murdered at his orders. This murder theory was not accepted by all scholars, and further analysis of the x-rays, along with CT scans taken in 2005, found no evidence to suggest that Tutankhamun died from a blow to the head as Brier had theorized. The cause of Tutankhamun's demise is still an open problem in Egyptology, and Bob Brier still maintains the plausibility of Ay's treasonous conspiratorial plotting, despite the physical cause of death Brier hypothesized being discounted.

A wall of Tutankhamun's burial chamber depicts Ay at the burial of Tutankhamun. The explicit depiction of a succeeding king conducting the "Opening of the Mouth" ceremony of another is unique; the depictions are usually more generic.

Ay was one of Tutankhamun's key advisors and is widely considered to have been among the most influential figures of his reign. Although some scholars argue that he may have been the power behind the throne, conclusive evidence supporting this remains lacking. Unlike Horemheb, his eventual rival in the succession following the king's death, Ay appears in depictions of Tutankhamun's building projects. For example, in the king's mortuary temple, Ay is depicted as a fan-bearer within Tutankhamun's entourage.

== Reign ==
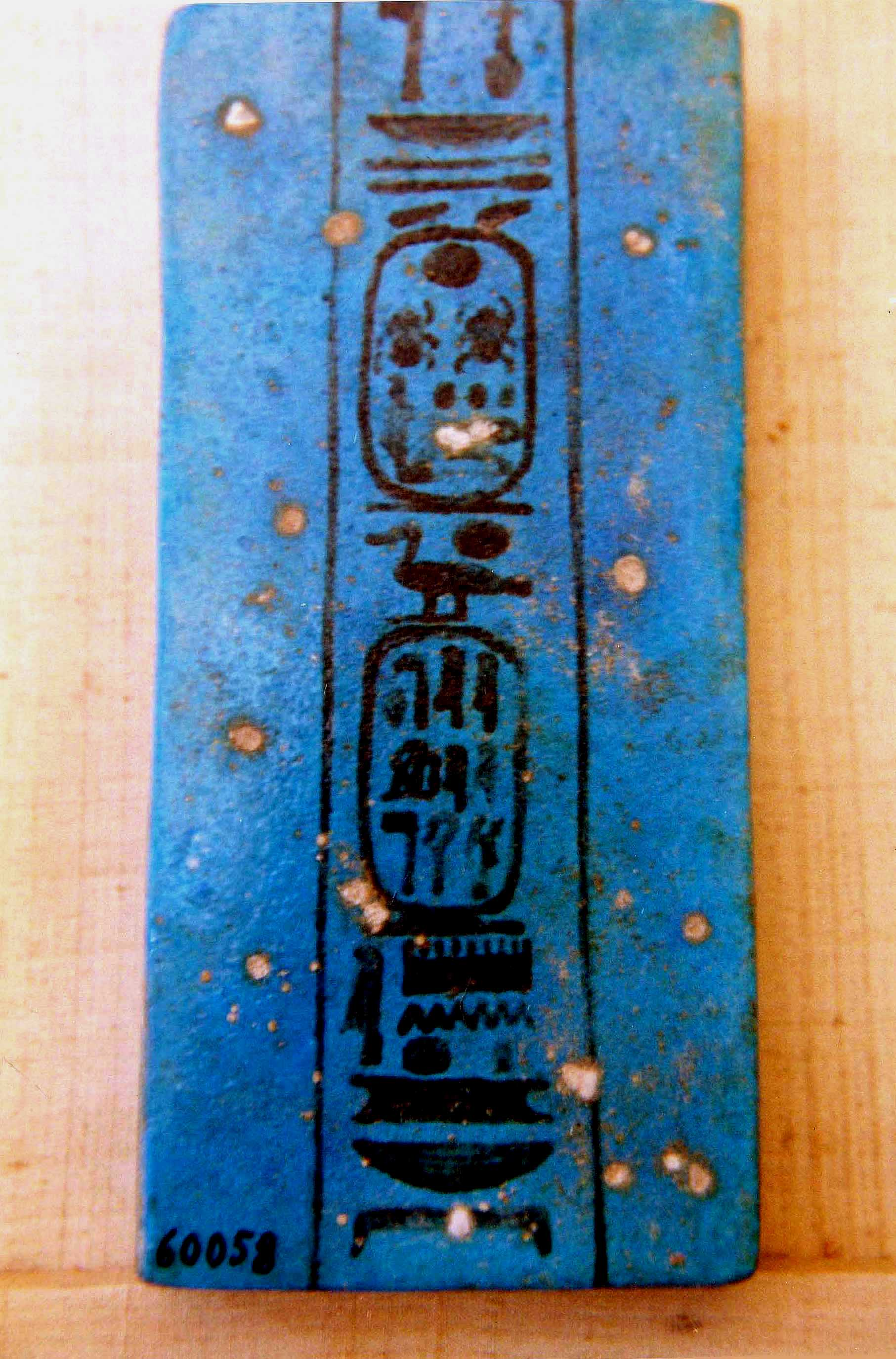
Faience plate with the complete royal titulary of Ay, Egyptian Museum.

Depending on the chronology followed, Ay served as pharaoh between 1323 and 1319 BC, 1327–1323 BC, or 1310–1306 BC. Tutankhamun's death around the age of 18 or 19, together with the fact he had no living children, left a power vacuum that was filled by his advisor Ay. He is depicted conducting the funerary rites for the deceased monarch and assuming the role of the new king. The grounds on which he based his successful claim to power are not entirely clear. The Commander of the Army, Horemheb, had actually been designated as the "Iry-pat" or "hereditary prince" under Tutankhamun and was presumed to be the king's heir and successor. Whether Horemheb was the heir to the throne is a matter of debate. If he had truly been the heir, it could have signified the planned end of the dynasty. Other officers, such as Huy and Sennedjem held the same title but yet did not have a claim to the throne. Ay was crowned as pharaoh, despite other possible claims. He legitimized his claim to the throne by burying Tutankhamun. He may have married Ankhesenamun, Tutankhamun's widow.

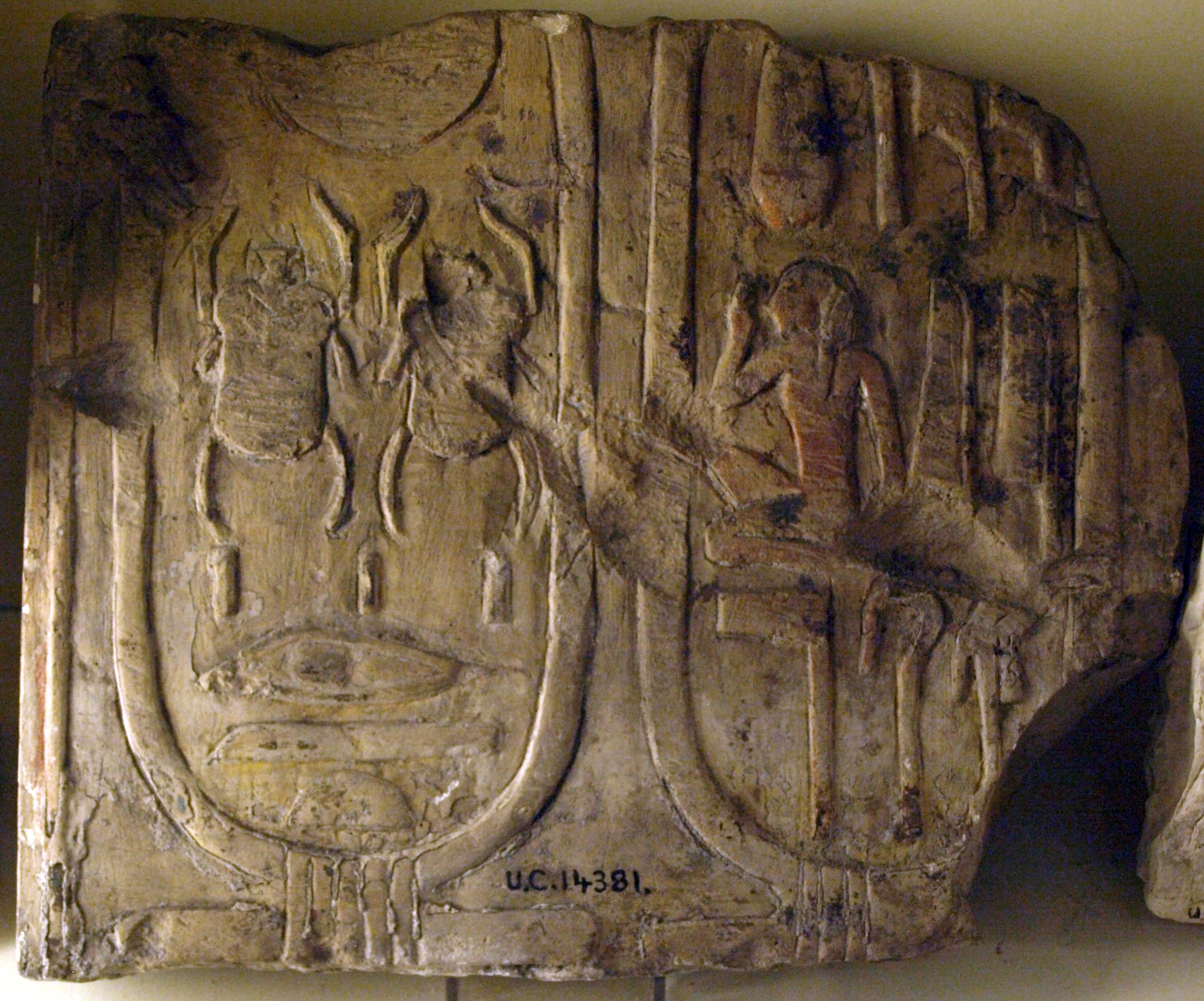
Fragment of a cartouche of Ay in the Petrie Museum

Since Ay was already advanced in age upon his accession, he ruled Egypt in his own right for only four years. During this period, he consolidated the return to the old religious ways that he had initiated as senior advisor and constructed a mortuary temple at Medinet Habu for his own use. A stela of Nakhtmin (Berlin 2074), a military officer under Tutankhamun who was Ay's chosen successor—is dated to "Year 4, IV Akhet day 1" of Ay's reign. Manetho's Epitome assigns a reign length of four years and one month to Horemheb, and this was usually assigned to him based on this Year 4 dated stela; however, it is now believed that figure should be raised by a decade to fourteen years and one month and attributed to Horemheb instead, as Manetho intended. Hence, Ay's precise reign length is unknown and he could have ruled for as long as seven to nine years, since most of his monuments and his funerary temple at Medinet Habu were either destroyed or usurped by his successor, Horemheb.

== Succession ==
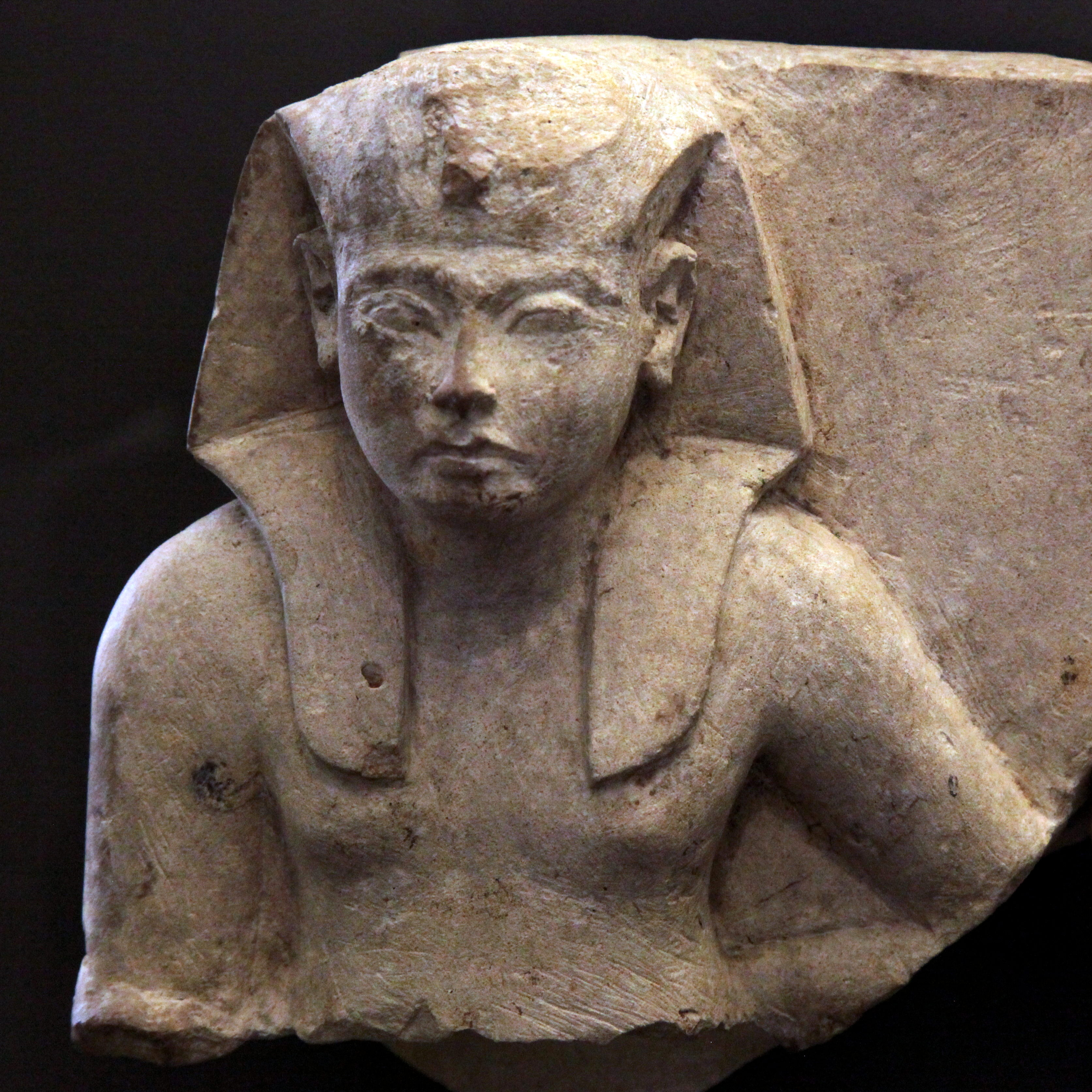
Reproduction of a Portrait of Ay, on display at Musée d'Art et d'Histoire of Geneva. Detail of a statue of the royal couple of king Ay and Queen Tey, the fragment depicting Tey being a reproduction of a piece now located at the Hermitage in Saint-Petersburg (inv 18477).

Prior to his death, Ay attempted to sideline Horemheb from the royal succession. Horemheb, who was the general in charge of Egypt's armies and previously held the title of Iry-pat or "Hereditary Prince" under Tutankhamun, was replaced in the succession by General Nakhtmin under king Ay. In fact, two separate men were designated Iry-pat or "Hereditary Prince" under Ay's short reign namely: Nay and Nakhtmin.

=== Nay Iry-pat ===
Egyptologist Nozomu Kawai writes that

"Nay built his TT271 tomb at the hill of Qurnat Murai, facing Ay's mortuary temple at Medinet Habu where he holds the titles of: "chief physician", "chamberlain", "overseer of the King's private apartment", and "fan bearer on the right of the king", suggesting that he was the highest palace official under King Ay. Moreover, King Ay promoted Nay not only to "Hereditary Prince", but also to "great chief in the entire land", "scribe of the elite troops", and "chief spokesman in the entire land", indicating that he [Nay] outranked all other officials under the king. In fact, these titles were previously held by Horemheb during Tutankhamun's reign. However, it is not likely that Nay took over Horemheb's position. As I have already argued, these titles, including jrj-pꜥt, could have just indicated the heads of the government, not the "designated successor" or "Crown Prince". In fact, Nay's tomb did not suffer from any damnatio memoriae. This suggests that Nay was not the designated successor and he could not have been Horemheb's rival."

=== Nakhtmin Iry-pat ===
In contrast, the case of general Nakhtmin is quite different than that of Nay. As Kawai writes:

"Nakhtmin was a general, probably a subordinate of Horemheb in the military under Tutankhamun, but he had also a close relation to Ay. He is known to have dedicated five shabtis to Tutankhamun's funerary equipment. On these shabtis, he was called "General" and "fan bearer on the right of the king". Then, he appears to have been promoted by King Ay to not only "Hereditary Prince" and "Generalissimo" but also even "King's Son" [(zꜣ-nswt)]– namely the "Crown Prince" of Ay who would succeed the throne. This title is undoubtedly superior to Horemheb's status. Therefore, King Ay intended to relegate Horemheb to a less important position and replace him with Nakhtmin to carry out his functions. We do not know exactly when Nakhtmin was promoted, but this must have created Horemheb's strong hostility against King Ay."

Ay's succession plans went awry, as Horemheb became the last king of Egypt's 18th Dynasty instead of Nakhtmin. The fact that Nakhtmin was Ay's intended political heir is strongly implied by an inscription carved on a dyad funerary statue of Nakhtmin and his spouse which was presumably made during Ay's reign. Nakhtmin is clearly given the titles "Crown Prince" (jrj-pꜥt) and "King's Son" (zꜣ-nswt). The only conclusion which can be drawn here is that Nakhtmin was either a son or an adopted son of Ay's, and that Ay was grooming Nakhtmin for the royal succession instead of Horemheb. The British Egyptologists Aidan Dodson and Dyan Hilton observe that the aforementioned statue:

... is broken after the signs for "King's Son of", and there has been considerable debate as to whether it continued to say "Kush", making Nakhtmin a Viceroy of Nubia, or "of his body", making him an actual royal son. Since there is no other evidence for Nakhtmin as a Viceroy—with another man [Paser I] attested in office at this period as well—the latter suggestion seems the most likely. As Nakhtmin donated items to the burial of Tutankhamun without such a title, it follows that he only became a King's son subsequently, presumably under Ay. This theory is supported by the evidence of intentional damage to Nakhtmin's statue, since Ay was amongst the Amarna pharaohs whose memories were execrated under later rulers.

== Aftermath ==
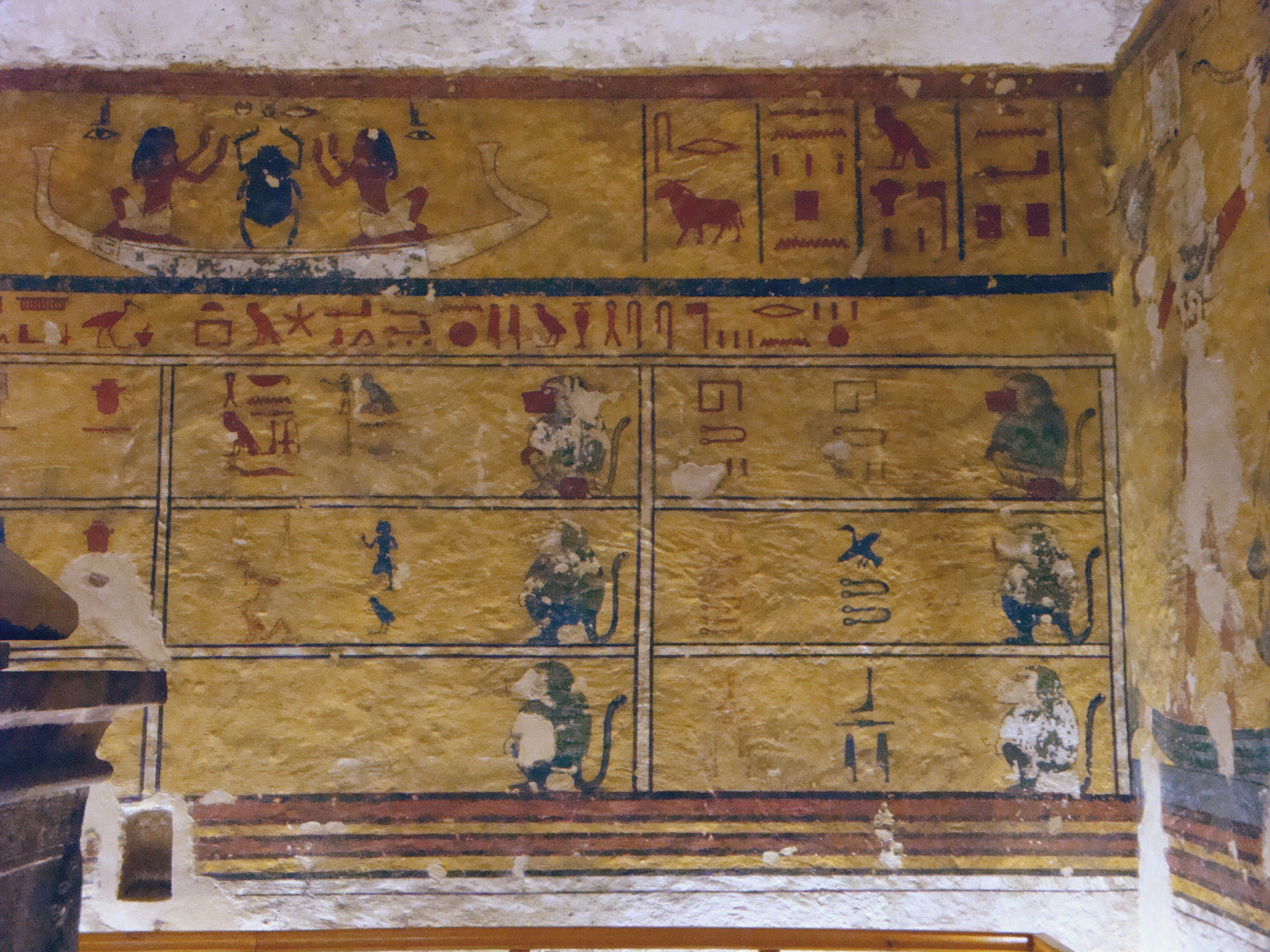
The burial chamber of Ay's tomb in the Valley of the Kings

It appears that one of Horemheb's undertakings as Pharaoh was to eliminate all references to the monotheistic experiment, a process that included expunging the name of his immediate predecessors, especially Ay, from the historical record. Horemheb desecrated Ay's burial and had most of Ay's royal cartouches in his WV23 tomb erased while his sarcophagus was smashed into numerous fragments. However, the intact sarcophagus lid was discovered in 1972 by Otto Schaden. The lid had been buried under debris in this king's tomb and still preserved Ay's cartouche. Horemheb also usurped Ay's mortuary temple at Medinet Habu for his own use. Uvo Hölscher (1878–1963) who excavated the temple in the early 1930s provides these interesting details concerning the state of Ay-Horemheb's mortuary temple:

Wherever a cartouche has been preserved, the name of Eye [i.e., Ay] has been erased and replaced by that of his successor Harmhab. In all but a single instance had it been overlooked and no change made. Thus the temple, which Eye had begun and finished, at least in the rear rooms with their fine paintings, was usurped by his successor and was thenceforth known as the temple of Harmhab. Seals on stoppers of wine jars from the temple magazines read: "Wine from the temple of Harmhab".

Nozomu Kawai describes Horemheb's actions as a damnatio memoriae since once he became king, Horemheb "started erasing all depictions of [king] Ay on the monuments of Tutankhamun, as well as those on Ay's royal monuments and those of his entourage. This action must be understood as damnatio memoriae. Horemheb desecrated Ay's tomb (KV 23) in the Western Valley of the Kings...and removed all other [visible] inscriptions and images of Ay." The rivalry which began when Ay attempted to sideline Horemheb from the royal succession ended in Horemheb's victory.

== In fiction ==
- Ay is a central character in Gwendolyn MacEwen's novel King of Egypt, King of Dreams, where he is portrayed as one of Akhenaten's closest confidants, spiritual antagonists, and supporters.
- Mika Waltari's novel The Egyptian portrays Ay as a power hungry cleric and the father of Nefertiti, who is hinted at having originally introduced the Aten based faith to the adolescent Akhenaten. Later, upon the failures of Akhenaten's reign escalating into widespread popular violence he realigns himself again with the worship of Amun and allies himself with Horemheb and the royal physician Sinuhe against the pharaoh. Later upon usurping the throne he starts growing increasingly delusional over potential assassins, and dies of self-inflicted starvation. His character is omitted in the 1954 film adaptation.
