= Nakhtmin =

Ancient Egyptian scribe, general

N35 M3 Aa1 X1 R22 R12 C8
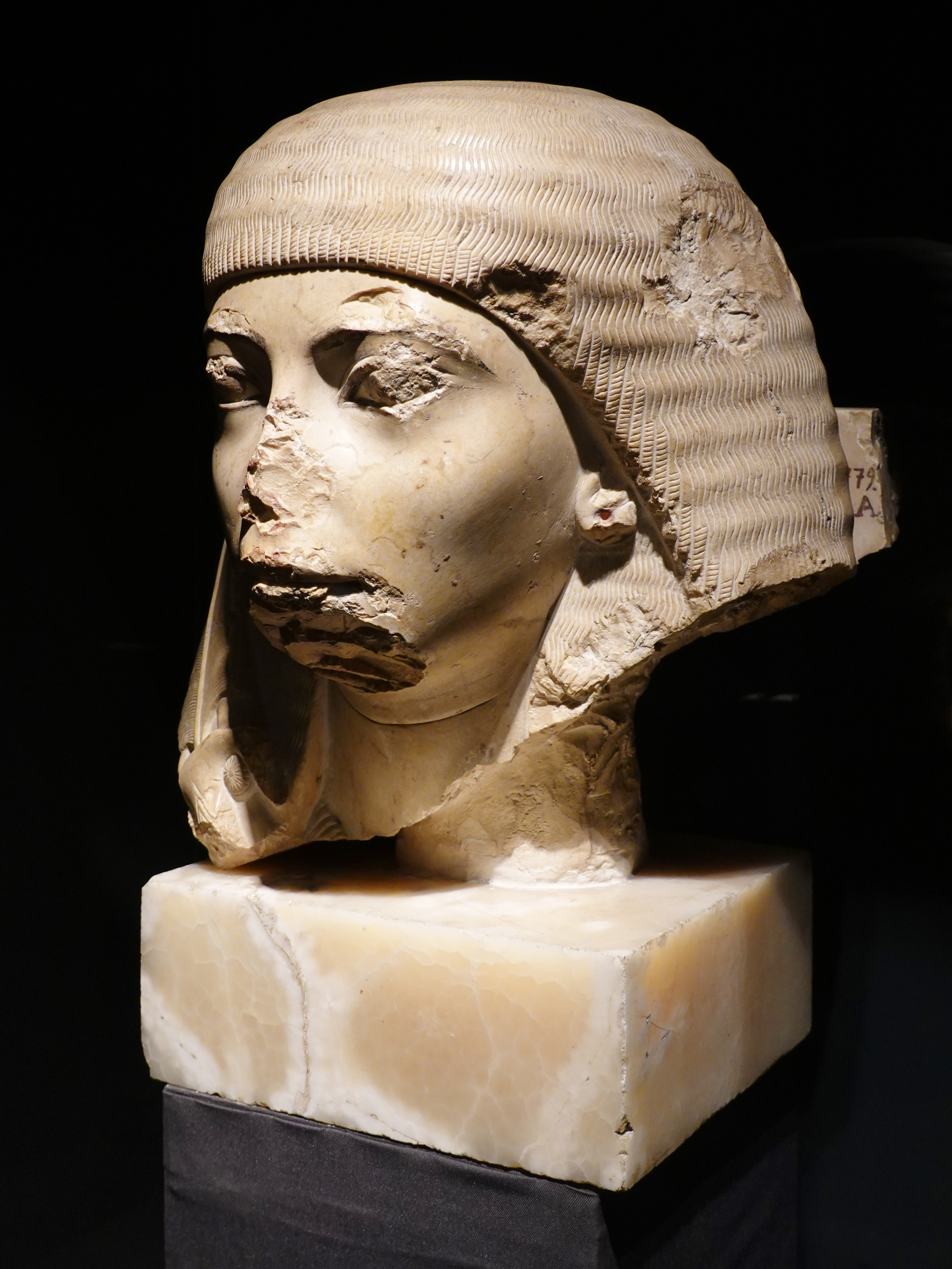
- Statue head of Nakhtmin
- Born: Akhmim, Upper Egypt
- Relatives: Ay (possibly father); Iuy (mother)
- Military career
- Allegiance: 18th Dynasty of Egypt (Tutankhamun)
- Rank: Great overseer of troops (General)

Nakhtmin (also Minnakht) held the position of general during the reign of pharaoh Tutankhamun of the Eighteenth Dynasty of Ancient Egypt. His titles during the reign of Tutankhamun included "the true servant who is beneficial to his lord, the king's scribe," "the servant beloved of his lord," "the Fan-bearer on the Right Side of the King," and "the servant who causes to live the name of his lord." These titles were found on five ushabtis that Nakhtmin offered as funerary presents for pharaoh Tutankhamun.

He was the heir to the throne during the reign of the pharaoh Ay though he never became a pharaoh. It is assumed by scholars that he died towards the end of the reign of Ay (when he seemingly vanished from all records) and Horemheb, the designated heir of Tutankhamun, became pharaoh instead.

== Crown Prince ==
The identity of Nakhtmin's father is not known with certainty. Some scholars suggest that he may have been the son of pharaoh Ay, his mother being known from a statue to be the 'Adoratrix of Min, Songstress of Isis' Iuy. Nakhtmin appears to have been the chosen successor to Ay, but died before he could succeed. On a beautiful statue of Nakhtmin and his wife in the Egyptian Museum in Cairo, Nakhtmin was identified as the "Crown Prince" (jrj-pꜥt) and "King's Son". (zꜣ-nswt) This title could be completed as "King's Son of his own body," which would make him the son of Ay, or it could be completed as the "King's Son of Kush". There is no record of a Viceroy of Kush by the name of Nakhtmin, and it seems that the nobleman Paser I was Viceroy during that time period. This has led to the identification of Nakhtmin as Ay's son, or adopted son.

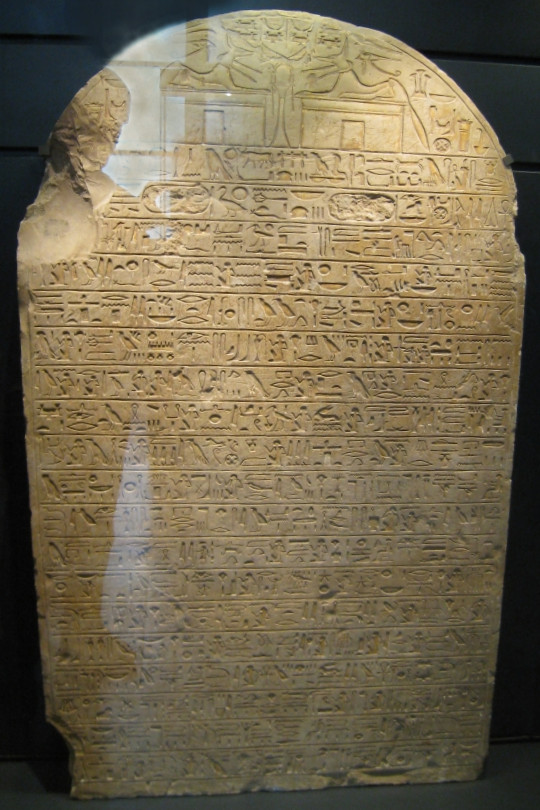
Stela of Nakhtmin

The statue with the inscription has suffered extensive damage. Only two pieces remain, the head and shoulders of Nakhtmin and the upper part of the body and head of his wife. Both statues look as though the eyes, nose and mouth have been deliberately damaged. This has been interpreted as some form of persecution even after death. His stelae—which had been set up at his (and Ay's) native city of Akhmim—were defaced. It is assumed that his tomb, which was never discovered, has been given the same treatment as that of Ay.

Another man called Nakhtmin was married to Mutemnub, the sister of Ay's wife Tey. They had a son named Ay, who was High Priest of Mut and Second Prophet of Amun.
