= Tomb of Ay, Amarna =

Ancient Egyptian tomb

Coordinates: 27.6617°N 30.9056°E

Tomb of Ay at Amarna (Southern Tomb 25)
- Burial site of Ay
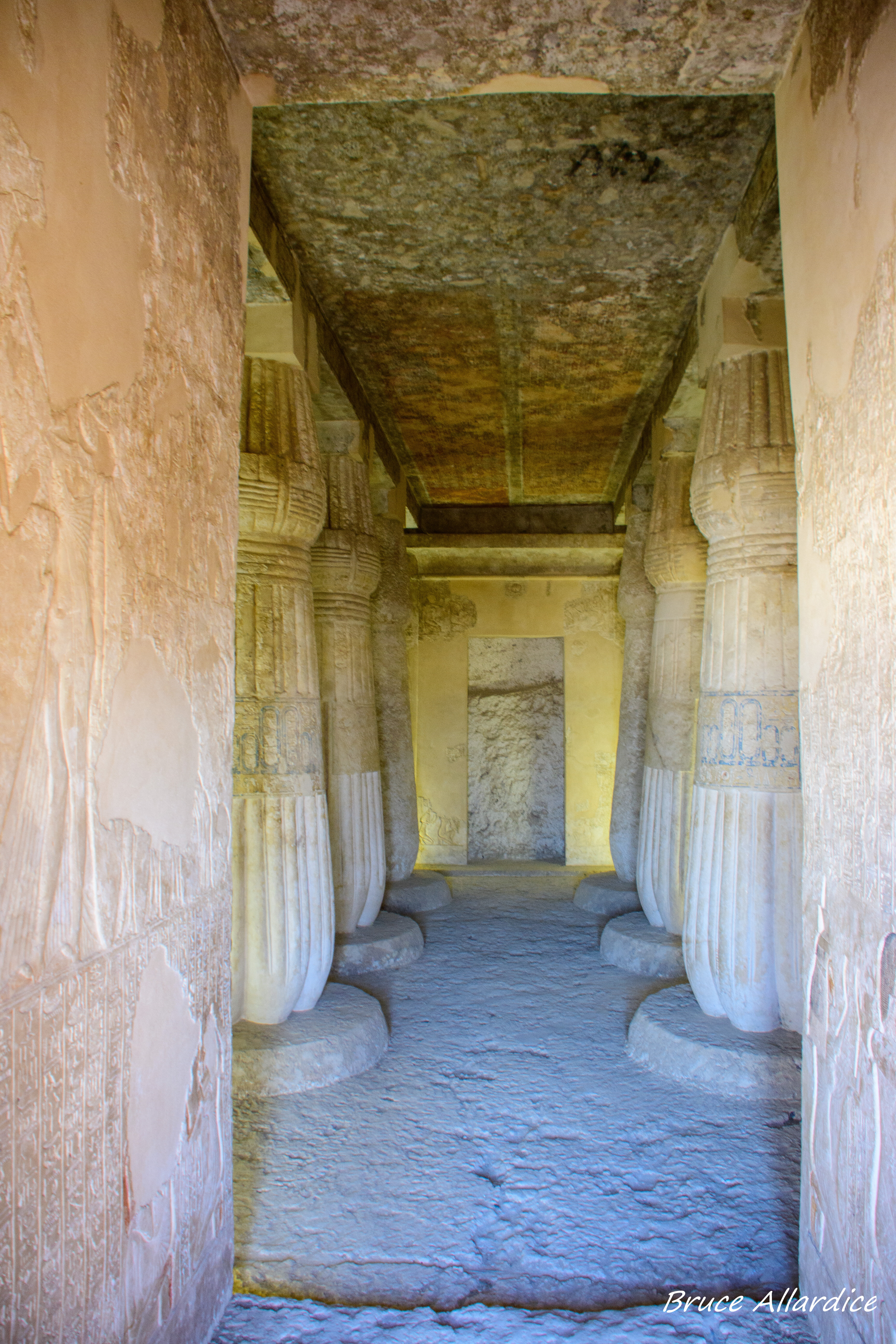
- View from the entrance of Ay's Amarna EA25 tomb

- Location within Egypt
- Location: Southern tombs, Amarna
- ← Previous; Amarna Tomb 24 Next → Southern Tomb 25a

The Tomb of Ay at Amarna is a tomb chapel in Amarna, Egypt. It is the last and southernmost tomb in Amarna and is named Southern Tomb 25. It was intended for the burial of Ay, who later became Pharaoh, after the 18th Dynasty king Tutankhamun. The grave was never finished, and Ay was later interred in the Western Valley of the Valley of the Kings (tomb WV23), in Thebes.

The tomb was only partially carved from the rock, with the first part of the pillared hall approaching completion. It contains depictions of Ay receiving rewards from Akhenaten and Nefertiti.

This Amarna tomb was published after an excavation in 1903 by Norman de Garis Davies. A depiction of a pair of red gloves were interpreted by Davies as "the first" gloves ever. The tomb also contains the longest, most complete version of the Great Hymn to the Aten.

== Ay's Bio ==
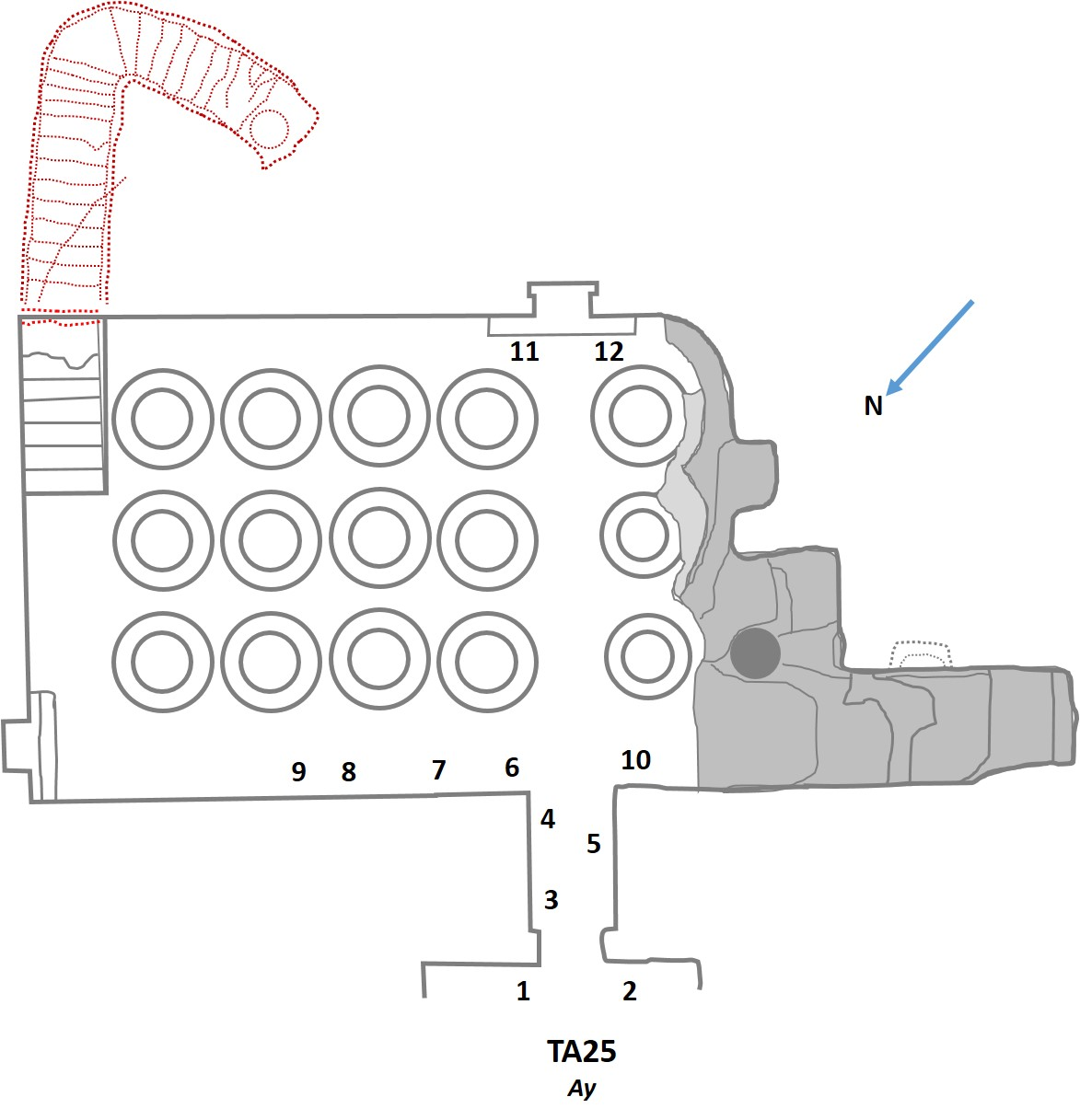
Plan of the Amarna tomb of Ay

On Boundary Stela K, one of the sixteen large granite stelae that set the boundaries of Ahketaten, Akhenaten dictated the tombs beyond the royal necropolis to include "Let there be a tomb made for The God's Father." This tomb could be the evidence of that edict being carried out.

The titles listed in Ay's tomb were: The God's Father; The Favorite of The Good God, Ay; Father of Divinity; Acting Scribe of the King, Beloved by Him; Fanbearer on the Right Hand of the King; Overseer of All the King's Horses of His Majesty; Companion; The General Ay.

== Gallery ==
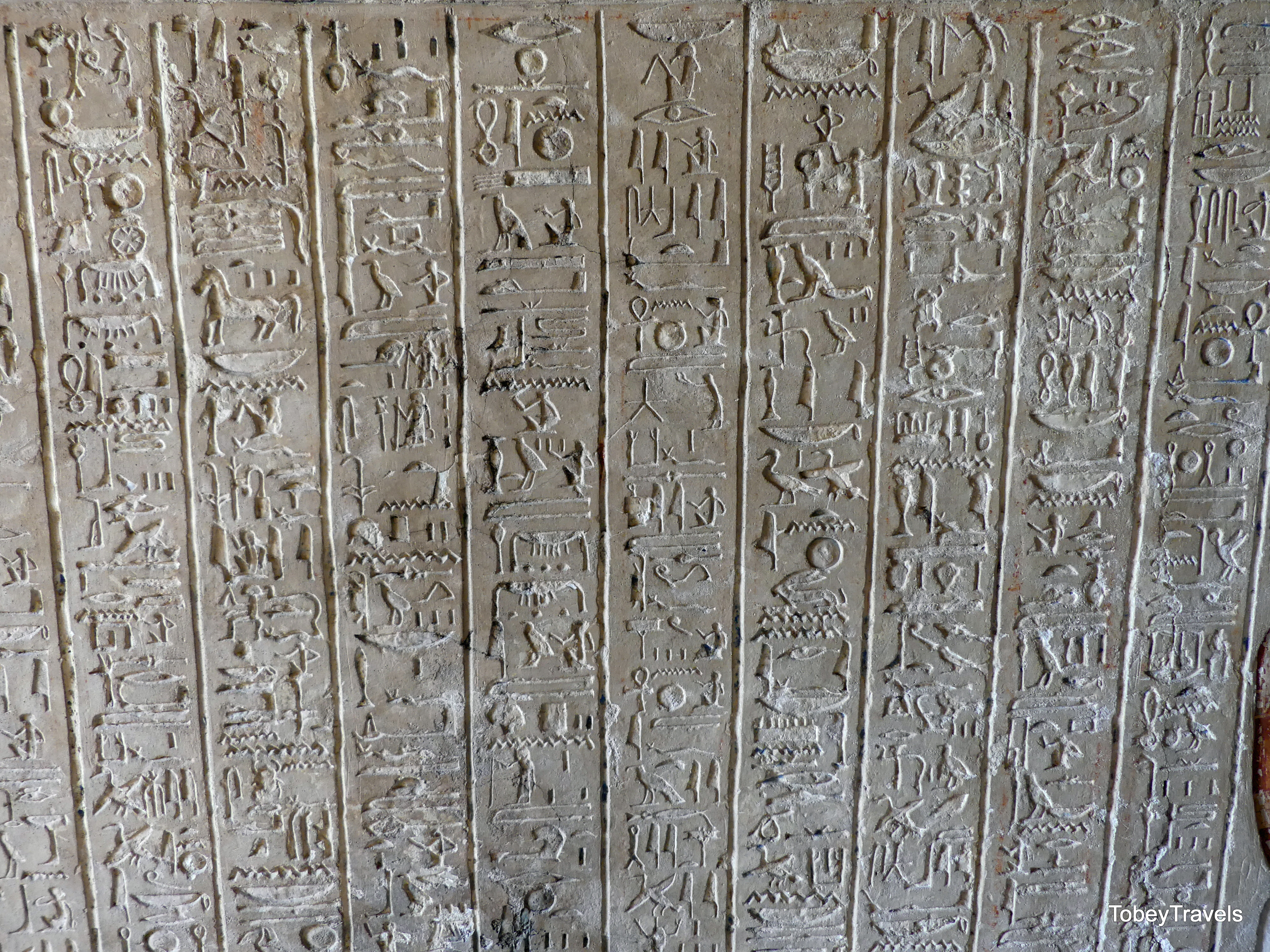
The Great Hymn to the Aten in Ay's tomb

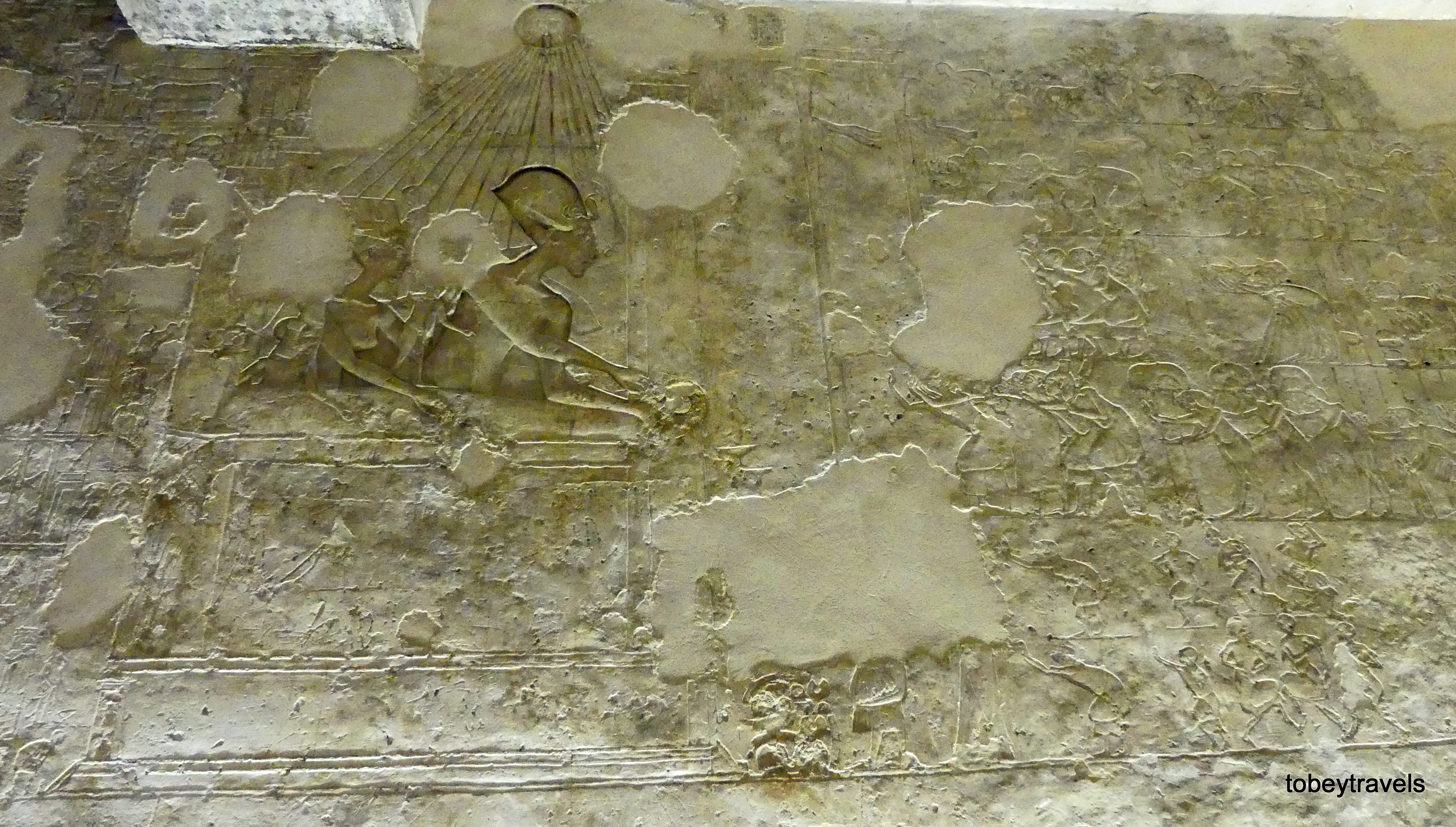
Akhenaten and Nefertiti at the Wall of Appearances of Ay's Amarna tomb

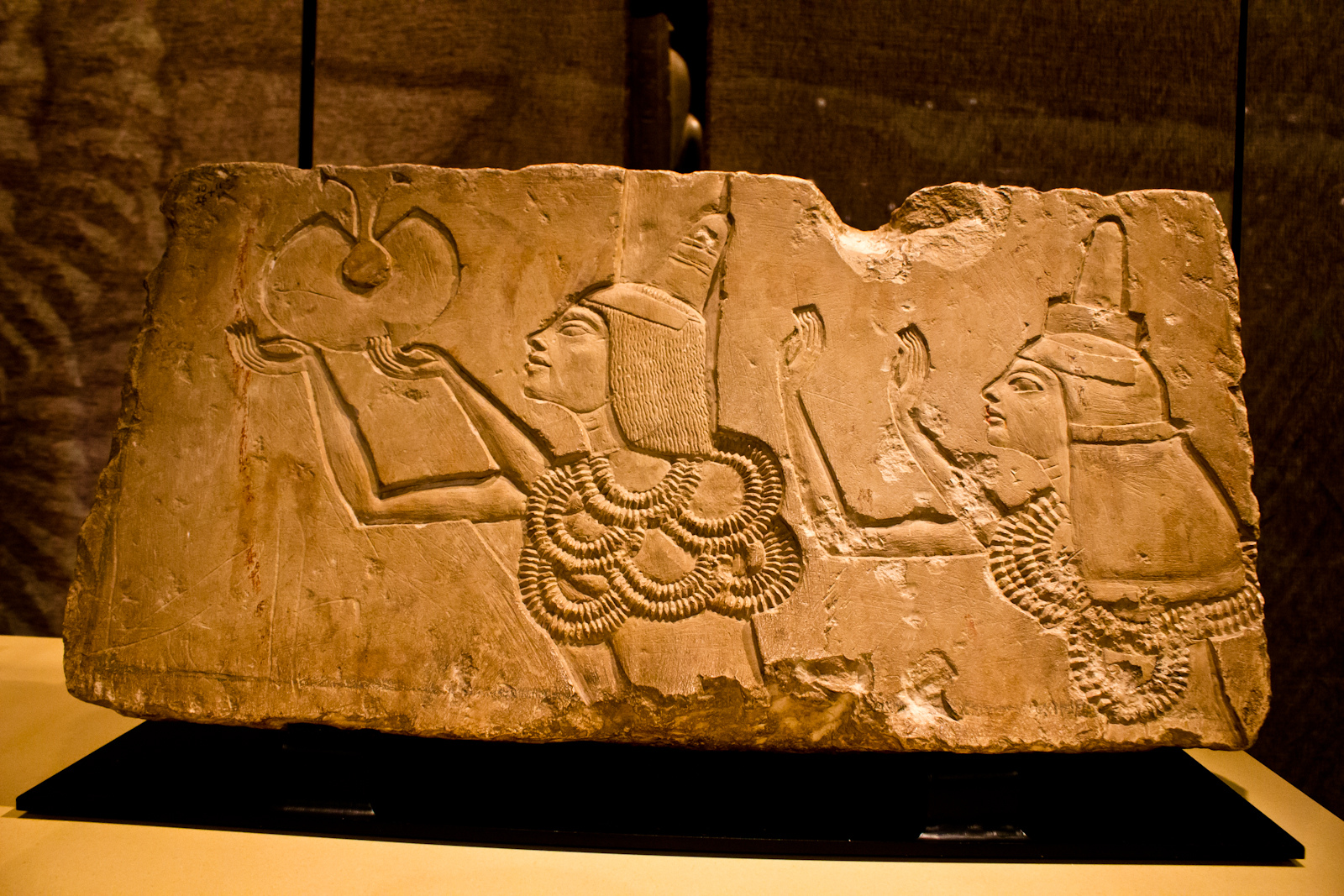
A limestone relief block from the tomb depicting Ay receiving the gold of honor from Akhenaten. His wife Tey is behind him.
