= Mortuary Temple of Ay and Horemheb =

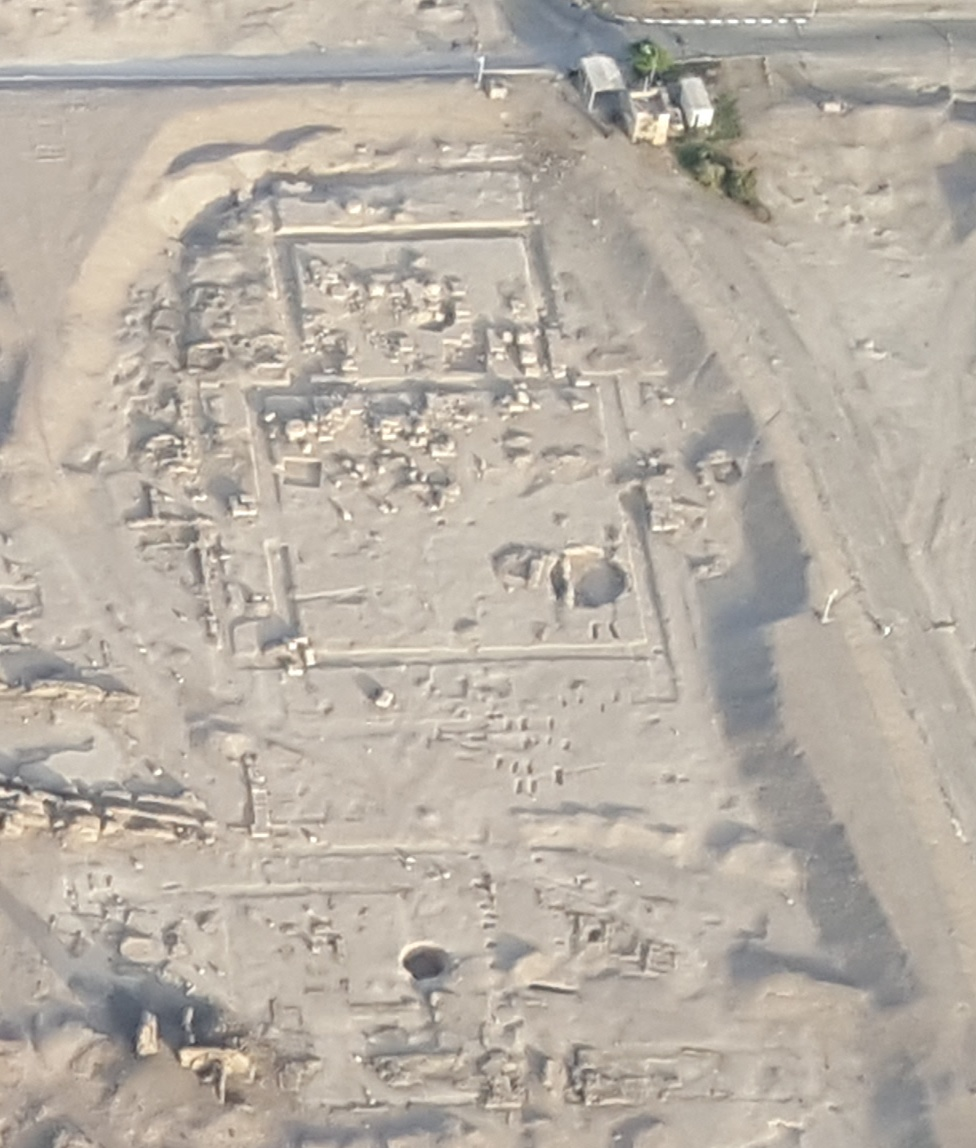
- Aerial view of the temple

- Location within Egypt
- 25°43′18″N 32°36′04″E
- Type: Mortuary temple
- Periods: Eighteenth Dynasty of Egypt
- Cultures: Ancient Egypt
- Location: Medinet Habu, Egypt
- Part of: Theban Necropolis

History
- Built: c. 1320 BC
- Built by: Ay; Horemheb

Site notes
- Excavation dates: 1931/1932
- Archaeologists: Uvo Hölscher
- Public access: No

The Mortuary Temple of Ay and Horemheb is an Ancient Egyptian temple located at Medinet Habu in the Theban Necropolis, on the west bank of the Nile, opposite the city of Luxor. It is the mortuary temple of the pharaohs Ay and Horemheb, successors of Tutankhamun. The monument is now almost completely destroyed.

The ruins of the temple were excavated in 1931 and 1932 by Uvo Hölscher of the Oriental Institute of the University of Chicago.

== Description ==
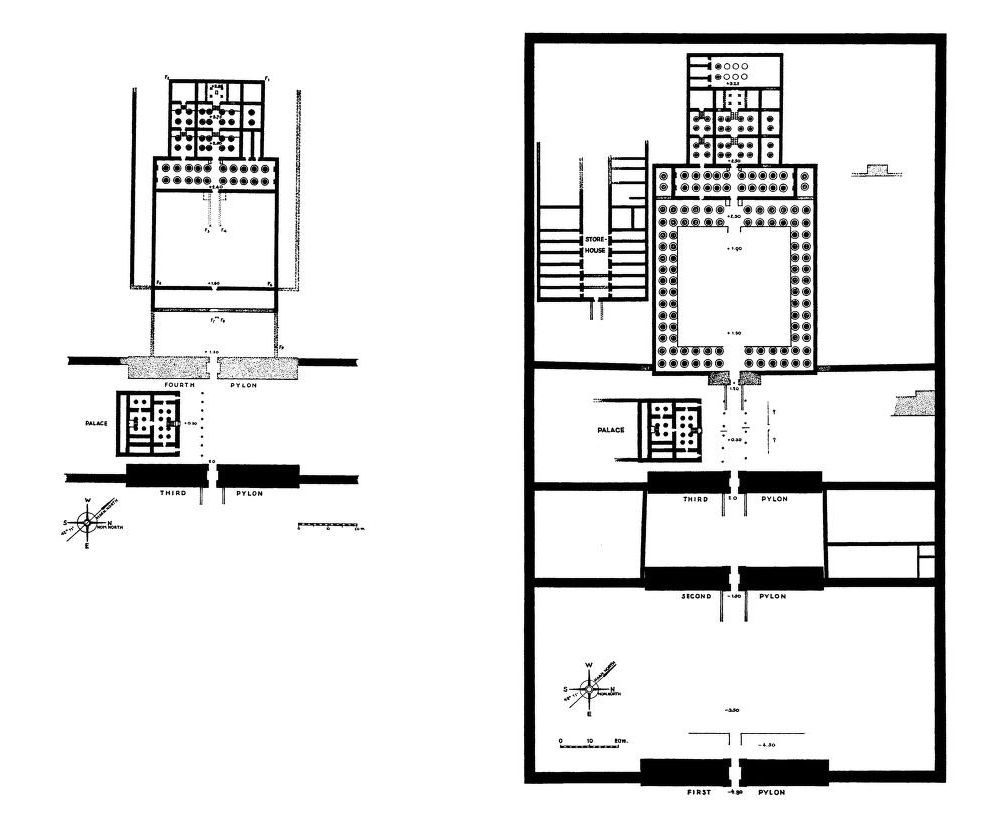
Floor plans of the temple at the time of Ay (left) and completed by Horemheb (right)

The Mortuary Temple of Ay and Horemheb was an Ancient Egyptian temple located in the Theban Necropolis, on the west bank of the Nile. It was situated at Medinet Habu, just north of the Mortuary Temple of Ramesses III.

The funerary complex was built on sloping ground: the rear of the structure stood eight metres higher than the front. As was often the case in such monuments, the temple itself was constructed in stone, here sandstone, while mudbrick was used for the ancillary structures. The temple consisted of three successive courts flanked by pylons, a peristyle court, several hypostyle halls and chambers, and finally the sanctuary. A small palace was also located within the third court.

== History ==
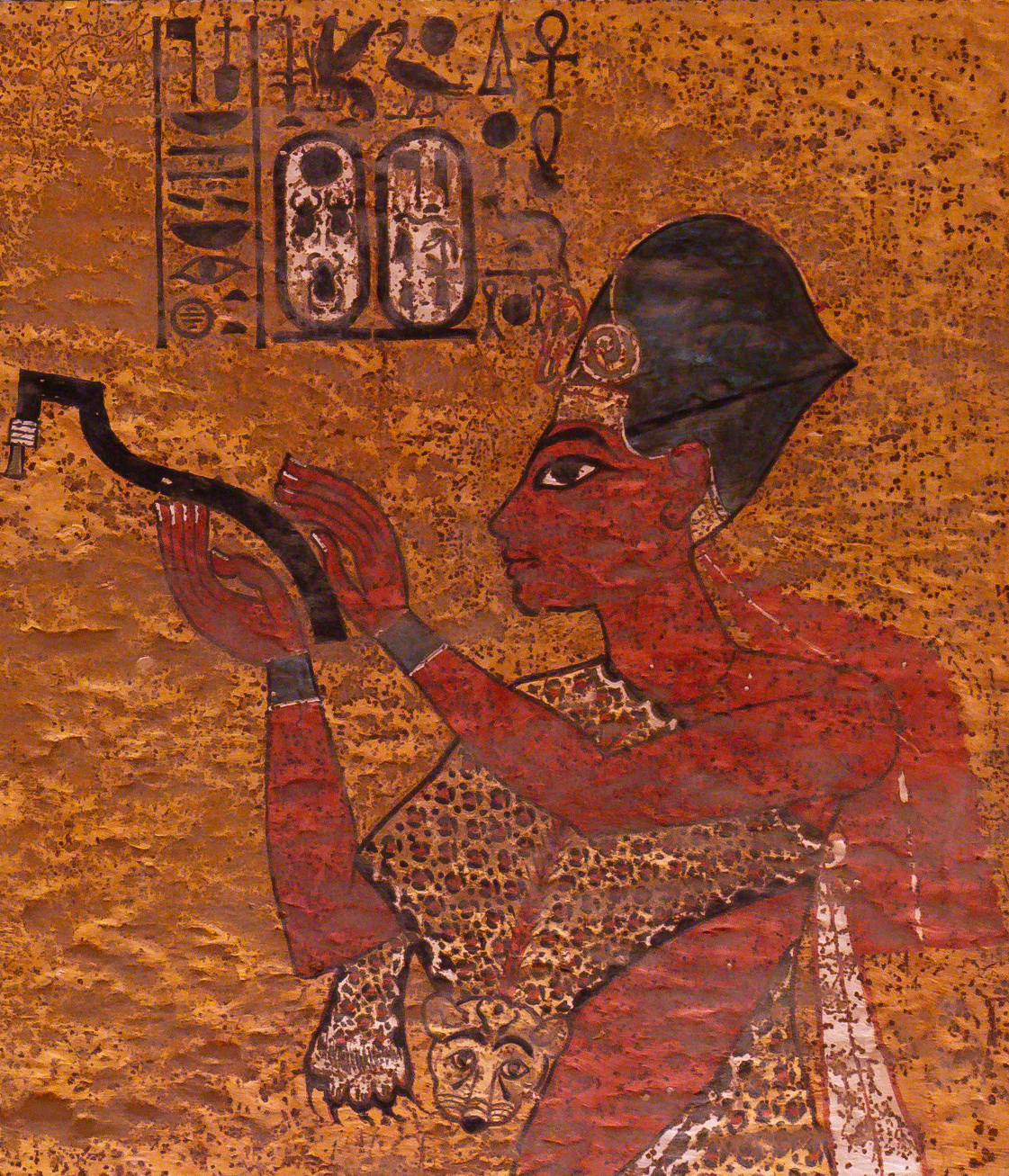
Ay

This mortuary temple was built during the reign of the pharaoh Ay in order to ensure the king's cult after his death. It stood at the southern end of the alignment of royal mortuary temples of the New Kingdom, along the processional route of the Beautiful Festival of the Valley. The building was constructed near the small temple of Amun of Medinet Habu and near the mortuary temple of Amenhotep III, and in front of the Luxor Temple of Thebes (on the opposite bank of the Nile), likely in order to demonstrate Ay's attachment to the newly restored cult of Amun after the Amarna Period and to show his proximity with Amenhotep III and the royal family of the Eighteenth Dynasty of Egypt.

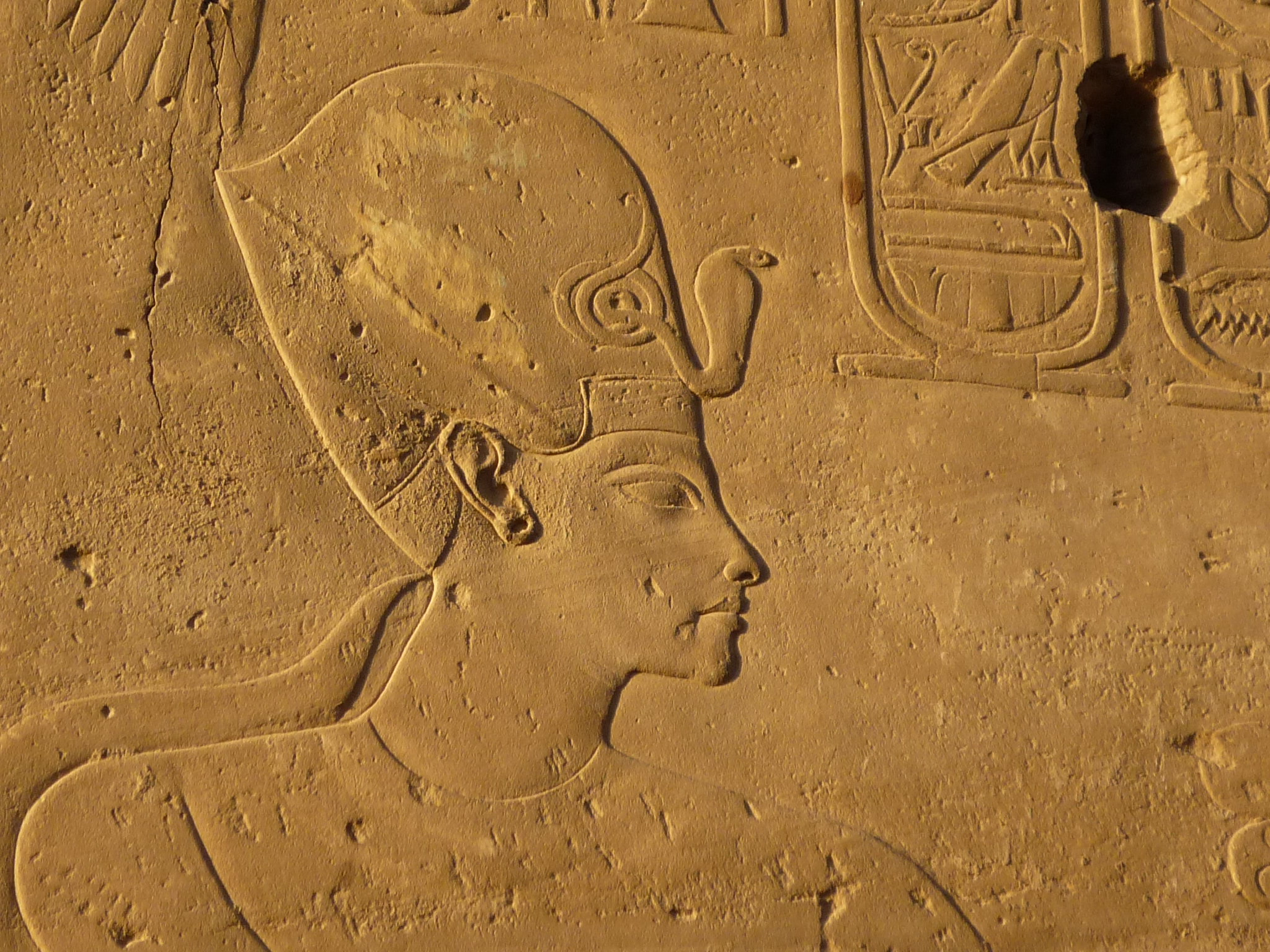
Horemheb

After the death of Ay, his successor Horemheb completed the construction of the funerary complex. Moreover, Horemheb usurped the temple and every trace of Ay's name was erased. The building, originally named "Mansion of Kheperkheperure-Iri-Maat, Enduring is the Memorial in the Place of Eternity”’, was renamed "Mansion of Djeserkheperure-Setepenre".

More than a century after the deaths of Ay and Horemheb, the immense mortuary temple of Ramesses III was built south of Horemheb's mortuary temple, incorporating the small temple of Amun of Medinet Habu and completely bordering the southern enclosure wall of the temple of Ay and Horemheb. The cult of Horemheb was probably still maintained there at that time.

== Bibliography ==
- Nelson, Harold H.; Hölscher, Uvo (1934). Work in Western Thebes, 1931–33. Chicago: University of Chicago Press.
- Hölscher, Uvo (1939). The Excavation of Medinet Habu, Vol II: The Temples of the Eighteenth Dynasty. Chicago: University of Chicago Press.
- Gabolde, Luc; Gabolde, Marc (1989). "Les temples mémoriaux de Thoutmosis II et Toutânkhamon (Un rituel destiné à des statues sur barque)". Bulletin de l'Institut Français d'Archéologie Orientale (in French). 89: 127–178.
- Wilkinson, Richard H. (2000). The Complete Temples of Egypt. London: Thames & Hudson. ISBN 9780500051009.
- Teeter, Emily (2003). Ancient Egypt: Treasures from the Collection of the Oriental Institute. Chicago: Oriental Institute of the University of Chicago. ISBN 9781885923257.
- Kawai, Nozomu (2010). "Ay versus Horemheb: The Political Situation in the Late Eighteenth Dynasty Revisited". Journal of Egyptian History. 3 (2): 261–292. doi:10.1163/187416610X541727.
- Ullmann, Martina (2015). "The Temples of Millions of Years at Western Thebes". In Wilkinson, Richard; Weeks, Kent R. (eds.). The Oxford Handbook of the Valley of the Kings. Oxford: Oxford University Press. pp. 417–432. doi:10.1093/oxfordhb/9780199931637.013.45. ISBN 9780199931637.
- Graham, Angus; Strutt, Kristian D.; Peeters, Jan; Toonen, Willem H. J.; Pennington, Benjamin T.; Emery, Virginia L.; Barker, Dominic S.; Johansson, Carolin (2017). "Theban Harbours and Waterscapes Survey, Spring 2016". Journal of Egyptian Archaeology. 102 (1): 13–22. doi:10.1177/030751331610200103.
- Slinger, Katherine (2022). Tomb Families: Private Tomb Distribution in the New Kingdom Theban Necropolis. Bicester: Archaeopress. ISBN 9781803270364.
