= Sennedjem (18th Dynasty) =

Ancient Egyptian official

Sennedjem was a high ancient Egyptian official living under King Tutankhamun at the end of the 18th Dynasty. Sennedjem was overseer of tutors but also bore several other titles, such as the father of the god, beloved of the god, and fan-bearer on the right side of the king. Sennedjem is so far only known from his decorated tomb at Akhmim. Today, The tomb is heavily destroyed, and much of the decoration is lost. It was never finished, and it is uncertain whether Sennedjem was ever buried here.

Several times, the name of King Tutankhamun appears in the tomb, proving that it was constructed under this king. In the tomb decoration also appears the overseer of nurses, Senqed. The tomb was built for two officials. It seems that the name of Sennedjem was deliberately erased from the tomb decoration. Sennedjem fell out of favour, and his memory was deleted. It is uncertain whether that happened under Tutankhamun or later.
