= Fan-bearer on the Right Side of the King =

Title of ancient Egyptian court official

G47 S37 Hr Z1 R14 a n M23
Fan-bearer on the Right Side of the King
ṯa(.y)-ḫw ḥr wnmy n nsw
in hieroglyphs
Era: New Kingdom
(1550–1069 BC)

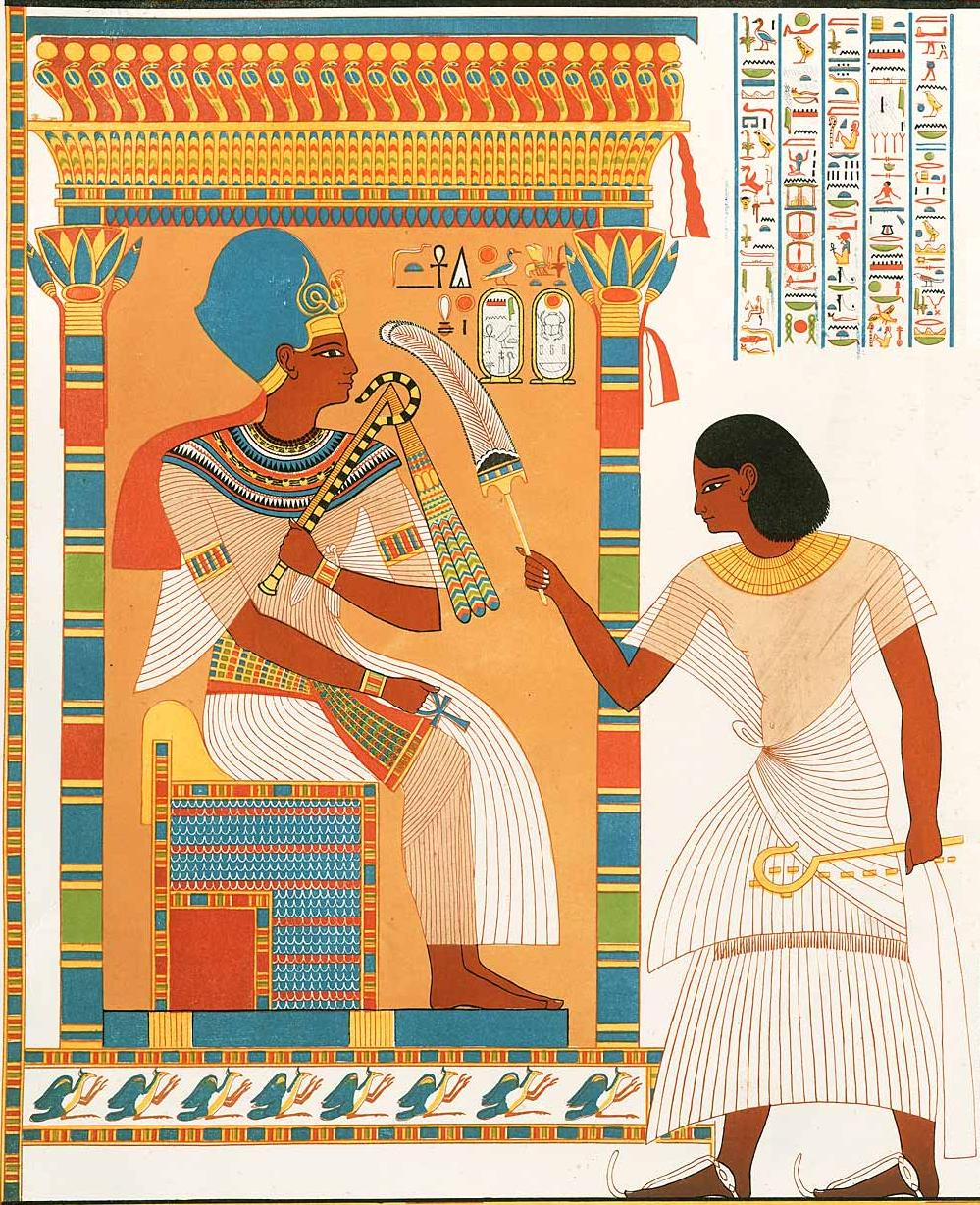
The Viceroy of Kush Amenhotep called Huy holding the long fan with the single feather indicating his rank as fan-bearer

The Fan-bearer on the Right Side of the King – sometimes also translated as Fanbearer on the King's Right Hand – was an office or title given to ancient Egyptian courtiers.

The title implies a very close personal or official relationship with the pharaoh. During the times of Amenhotep II and Tuthmosis IV the title was held by officials like the viceroy of Kush, the chief steward of the king, and several tutors, such as Sennedjem under Tutankhamun. Scenes depicting the fan-bearers show them holding a long fan with a single feather. Other important title holders include Maiherpri, who was buried in the Valley of the Kings.

== See also ==
- Flabellum
