= Edict of Horemheb =

Ancient Egyptian legal text

- Type: Legal text
- Material: Sandstone
- Writing: Ancient Egyptian hieroglyphs
- Period/culture: Eighteenth Dynasty of Egypt; New Kingdom of Egypt
- Discovered: 1882; Karnak Temple Complex, Egypt
- Discovered by: Gaston Maspero
- Present location: Karnak Temple Complex

The Edict of Horemheb, also known as the Great Edict of Horemheb, is an ancient Egyptian legal document commissioned by pharaoh Horemheb (1319-1292 BC). It is the most prominent document from Horemheb other than his coronation inscription. The artifact characterizes itself as a direct dictate from Horemheb himself to his scribes.

Horemheb's Edict was intended to address corruption, curb power abuses, punish crime far more harshly, and to strengthen Horemheb's reign. The text outlines severe repercussions for authority misuse and corruption, creates harsher armed forces penalties, establishes ideas for judicial reform, addresses personal security measures, and clarifies his stances on what the rightful repercussions of crime ought to be. It also establishes capital punishment for corrupt law officials.

Notably, the Edict of Horemheb introduces the criminal punishment of rhinotomy — the cutting off of the malefactor's nose — to Ancient Egypt; the practice was not known there before this. Rhinotomy as the reason the ancient location Tharu (mentioned in Horemheb's Edict as a region of exile) was referred to as Rhinocorura by later Ancient Greek authors. Horemheb is regarded as having built the city. The anci of Tharuent Egyptian remains of Tharu are possibly located within the bounds of the modern-day Tel Habuwa (Tell el-Habua) archaeological site.

== Discovery ==
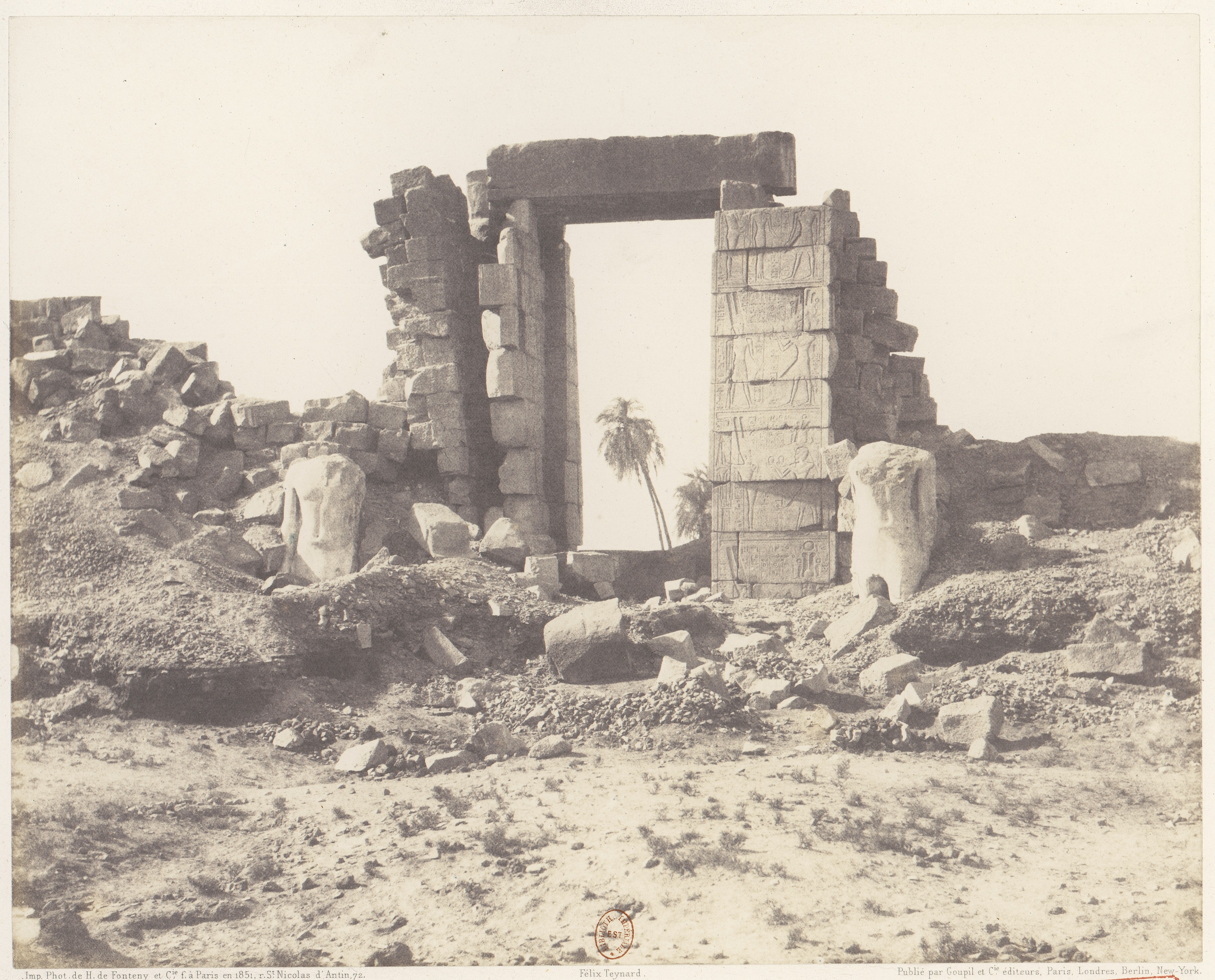
10th Pylon at Karnak

The Edict of Horemheb inscription was discovered by Egyptologist Gaston Maspero (1846-1916) near the 10th pylon at the Karnak Temple Complex in Egypt, some time around February or March, 1882. The artifact was discovered in damaged condition, and missing approximately one third of the text.

The contents of the Edict of Horemheb were first published by Urbain Bouriant (1849-1903), in an incomplete form, in 1885. Wilhelm Max Müller (1862-1919) would publish a somewhat more accurate copy of the Edict in his 1906 book, Egyptological Researches. Results of a Journey in 1904. James Henry Breasted (1865-1935) published a translated version of the text of The Edict of Horemheb within his volume Ancient Records of Egypt, Volume III in 1906, which is probably the most quoted.

== Overview ==
Horemheb was the last pharaoh of the Eighteenth Dynasty of ancient Egypt. He secured the throne, after a brief reign of pharaoh Ay, by receiving an Iry-pat designation by the antepenultimate pharaoh of the dynasty, Tutankhamun. When Tutankhamun came to the throne, ancient Egypt was under a heretic religion Atenism. The country was in a defunct state, and corruption was rife. When Horemheb attained the throne, he sought to address this corruption and crime. The Edict of Horemheb document is the official legal documentation of this proclamation.

The Edict explicitly mentions various corrupt practices that Horemheb felt were derided the state of Ancient Egyptian society. Examples of forms of this corruption are unlawfully seized property, bribery, embezzlement, the collected tax mismanagement of taxes collected and theft of slaves by tax collectors for their own personal use.

The main method Horemheb installed for decreasing this corruption and crime was new tough on crime punishments. Some of the new punishments Horemheb introduced were beatings, whippings and exile out of Ancient Egypt territory for corrupt soldiers. One of the most remarkable new punishments introduced was rhinotomy, the removal of noses, which is mentioned several times in the document. In the most severe cases of corruption, a punishment of the death penalty was established.

Horemheb also addressed the issue of mismotivation amongst government officials by increasing the pay rate for them, including judges and soldiers. This would decrease the financial burden of the employees, dissuading them from taking the risk of corrupt practices for extra money.

The document's style and wording is unique in comparison to other Ancient Egyptian edict writing. Horemheb's writing is very blunt, explicit and juridical. The text's introduction is the only section that contains the ceremonious wordiness typical of similar documents. It is also notable that his Edict refrains from making any explicit attacks on the rulership performance of previous pharaohs, unlike Tutankhamun's Restoration Stela.

== English translation ==
An English translation of the Edict translated by Egyptologist James Breasted is extracted below. The initials L.P.H. stand for "Life, Prosperity, Health". The central theme of Horemheb's text is criminological, specifically focused on criminal punishments. The tone of text is designed to be intimidating and cautioning to potential criminals, while relieving to victims of such crimes. The most prominent punishment, and historically the most significant to Horemheb's legacy as a ruler, was rhinotomy (the cutting off of a criminal's nose). It is referenced twice throughout the document:

...If there be a poor man who pays the dues of the breweries and kitchens of the Pharaoh, L.P.H., to the two deputies, and he be robbed of his goods and his craft, my majesty commands: that every officer who seizes the dues and taketh the craft of any citizen of the army or of any person who is in the whole land, the law shall be executed against him, in that his nose shall be cut off, and he shall be sent to Tharu.

Furthermore, as for those who... and those who bring to the harem, likewise for the offerings of all gods, paying dues to the two deputies of the army and... my majesty commands that if any officer is guilty of extortions or thefts, the law shall be executed against him, in that his nose shall be cut off, and (he) shall be sent to Tharu likewise.

Also notable in this text extract is that the promise of punishment for the commission of the mentioned crimes was being specifically directed at culprits that were corrupt government officers. Horemheb appeared especially concerned about those in positions of influence stealing from those he ruled over (based on their wealth, career, power, or other differential) the ability to fend for themselves, having already done so.

Later in history, Ancient Greek historians would refer to the exile location Tharu (also referred to as Tjaru, Tjarw, and Tharo; in hieroglyph, as ṯꜣrw; in Greek, as Sile) as Rhinocorura — the location's name's prefix the same as the prefix of the rhinotomy punishment itself, which came to be a signature feature in the appearance of those detained at Tharu.

Horemheb's Edict also explicitly gives detail about beatings as criminal punishments:

As for any citizen of the army, (concerning) whom one shall hear, saying: "He goeth about stealing hides," beginning with this day, the law shall be executed against him, by beating him a hundred blows, opening five wounds, and taking from him by force the hides which he took.

The specificity of the beating punishment is notable, as exactly five wounds are to be opened during beating. Horemheb continues on to describe how he has appointed two different judges, one for the Northern region and one for the Southern region, and commands them to not take bribes.

I have sought two officials perfect in speech, excellent in good qualities, knowing how to judge the innermost heart, hearing the words of the palace, the laws of the judgment-hall. I have appointed them to judge the Two Lands, to satisfy those who are in... I have given to each one his seat; I have set them in the two great cities of the South and the North; every land among them cometh to him without exception; I have put before them regulations in the daily register of the palace... I have directed them to the way of life; I led them to the truth, I teach them, saying: "Do not associate with others of the people; do not receive the reward of another, not hearing..." How, then, shall those like you judge others, while there is one among you committing a crime against justice?

Horemheb follows up with the punishment for the malfeasance of a government employee taking a bribe: The death penalty.

Now, as for any official or any priest (concerning whom) it shall be heard, saying: "He sits, to execute judgment among the official staff appointed for judgment, and he commits a crime against justice therein;" it shall be against him a capital crime. Behold, my majesty has done this, to improve the laws of Egypt, in qqaqaato cause that another should not be...

The document culminates by reiterating that new legal rules have been established.

Hear ye these commands which my majesty has made for the first time governing the whole land, when my majesty remembered these cases of oppression which occur before this land.

Horemheb's document has a sense of self-accomplishment to it, as it is clear that Horemheb is expecting these newly installed criminal punishments to be effective historical trends that later followed indicate that they were significantly effective, and Horemheb's legacy as a hard-nosed legal enforcer reigned true.

== See also ==
- Annals of Thutmose III
- Inventory Stela
- Bentresh stela
- Ikhernofret Stela
- Stele of Piye
- Autobiography of Weni
- The Maxims of Ptahhotep
- Instructions of Kagemni
- Hammurabi Code
- Code of Ur-Nammu
- Laws of Eshnunna
- Code of Lipit-Ishtar
- Law of Moses
- Edicts of Ashoka
