= Restoration Stela =

Ancient Egyptian legal text

- Restoration Stela at the Grand Egyptian Museum
- Type: Religious decree
- Material: Red granite
- Size: Height: 2.54m Width: 1.29m Thickness: 0.38m
- Writing: Ancient Egyptian hieroglyphs
- Created: c. 1327 BC (4th year of Tutankhamun reign)
- Period/culture: Eighteenth Dynasty of Egypt; New Kingdom of Egypt
- Discovered: July 1905; Great Hypostyle Hall, Egypt
- Discovered by: George Legrain
- Present location: Egyptian Museum

The Restoration Stela, also known as the Restoration Stela of Tutankhamun, is an ancient Egyptian text from the reign of pharaoh Tutankhamun decreeing the religiopolitical countermand of the Atenism religion of the pharaoh Akhenaten. It is a record of the governmental policy change wherein Atenism was officially repealed, and the original, indigenous religion of ancient Egypt was reinstated. It was discovered in 1905 by Egyptologist Georges Legrain in fragmented condition.

In overview, the writing details the deplorable conditions of the polytheistic religious institutions and society overall during the Atenism era, and how the pharaoh Tutankhamun enacted a system of revitalizing those religious institutions and reharmonizing society. These policies included various architectural and employment renovations.

Egyptologist Ray Johnson referred to Tutankhamun's reign as "one of the greatest periods of restoration in the history of Egypt".

== Discovery ==
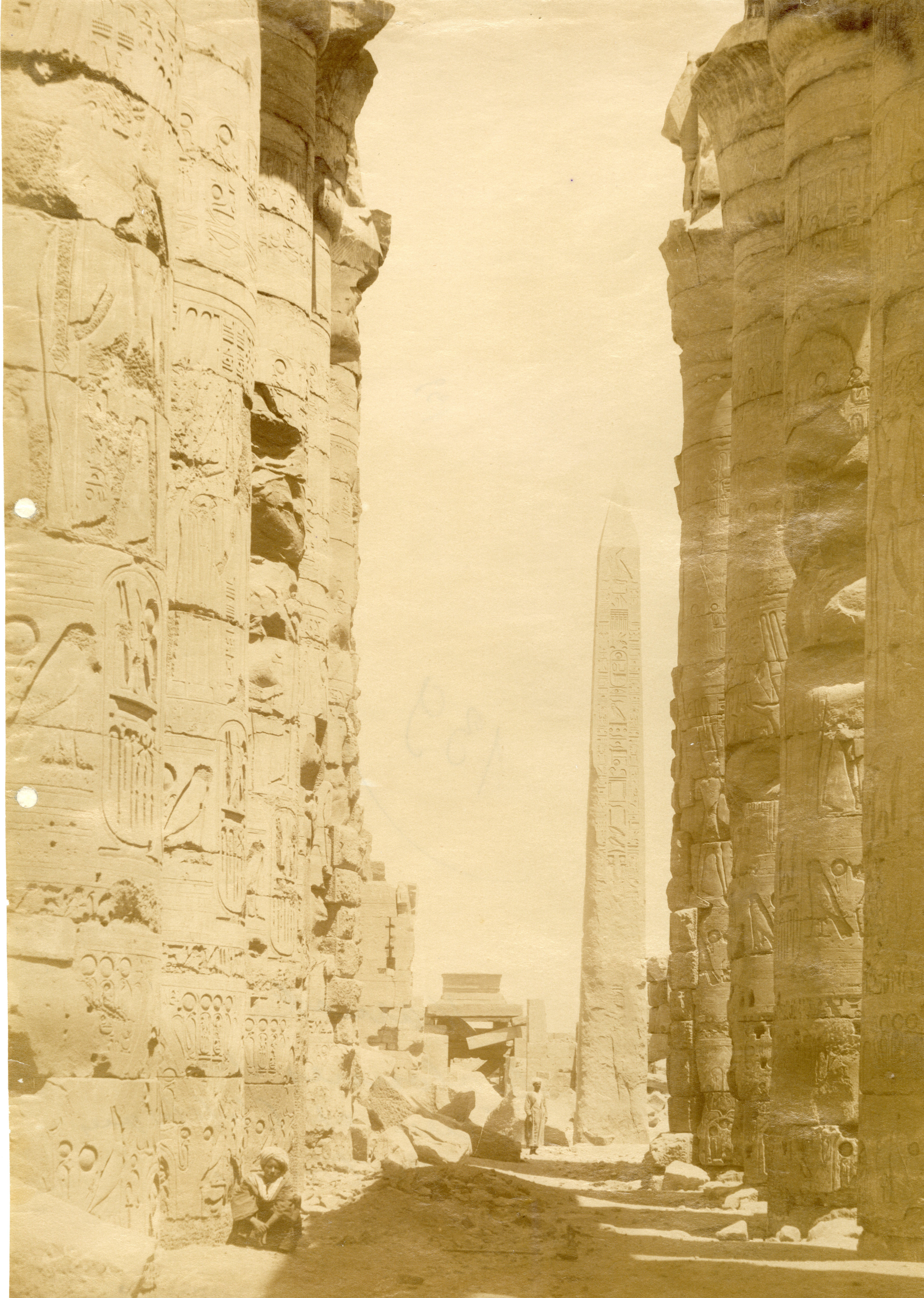
Central corridor of the Great Hypostyle Hall in the Karnak Temple Complex, ending with the Third Pylon (c. 1877)

The Restoration Stela of Tutankhamun was found by the French Egyptologist Georges Legrain in July 1905, temple of Amun at Karnak. The Stela was lying underground about half of a meter, in the North-East corner of the Great Hypostyle Hall before the Third Pylon. As discovered by Legrain, the stela was shattered into five parts because one of the columns of the Hall had fallen on it. At some time it had also been subjected to an attempt to split it by drilling holes down its center line, presumably to utilize the stone, but the attempt was unsuccessful. A fragment of a duplicate was found at the Temple of Montu (Medamud).

The stele at the Egyptian Museum, Cairo

Notably, the Restoration Stela was discovered approximately 17 years before the discovery of the tomb of Tutankhamun.

== Summary ==
The purpose of the Restoration Stela is to document and celebrate of the official governmental reversal of the Atenism religion. Its intention is to theologically contextualize that religiopolitical countermand.

=== Timeframe ===
The artifact dates itself as "fourth month of Akhet, day 19"; the regnal year is damaged. Some researchers date the artifact to "Year 1" of Tutankhamun's reign. However, Egyptologists such as William Murnane have argued that because Tutankhamun began his reign under the name "Tutankhaten", it is impossible to date the stela so early. Aidan Dodson reconstructs the date as "Year 4".

=== Subject matter ===
The Restoration Stela details various aspects of the societal turmoil in Egypt at the time of Atenism, and the actions that Tutankhamun took to repeal and remedy the situation. Egyptologist John Bennett writes:

The grammar and orthography of the inscription are transitional, and seem to reflect the unsettled state of the country after the reign of Akhenaten. As the period is one of struggle between the reactionary party of Amun and the revolutionary followers of the Aten, so the inscription a mixture of old and new words and phrases.

For example, the document purports that the Egyptian military was underperforming during the reign of Akhenaten, as the document reads:

If an army was sent to Djahy to extend the boundaries of Egypt, it would have no success.

This excerpt is historically consistent with pharaoh Akhenaten's unsuccessful attack on Kadesh.

The Restoration Stela also elaborates on how Tutankhamun rebuilt expensive religious properties, increased financial support to religious institutions and their employees that were previously neglected during the Atenism time period. For instance, the stela reads:

He made his father Amun 13 poles long ... although the majesty of this noble god had been only 7 poles long before.

This excerpt articulates that the rebuilt Amun architecture was nearly doubled in length compared to its previous size. This is consistent with how Tutankhamun's revocation of Atenism reemphasized religiosity of the god Amun, the god of his own namesake.

The source of the funding for the reconstructions is also detailed. Notably, wealth tributes from foreign countries, such as gold, are repeatedly mentioned as financial sources for Tutankhamun's reconstructive efforts.

=== Artwork ===
The artifact contains an artistic depiction of Tutankhamun making an offering of lotus and papyrus to the god Amun-Ra. The god is depicted responding affirmatively, while an inscribed caption narrates the ceremony as "giving flowers make a 'given life'". Also, there was an image of Ankhesenamun standing behind Tutankhamun on the stela in its original state. However, when Horemheb usurped the document, he completely erased her replacing the image with an inscription.

== Authorship ==
At the time of the creation of the Restoration Stela, Tutankhamun would have been at least nine years old. As it was customary for an ancient Egyptian prince to receive a comprehensive education, Tutankhamun would have been scholastically capable of authoring the text. Throughout the writing, Tutankhamun is referred to in the third person perspective, as His Majesty, as is customary for such documents. In one sentence of the writing, the first person perspective grammar is used, employing the Egyptian equivalent of the word "I". It refers to how the author is committed to protecting the newly hired servants, musicians and dancers:

I shall have them protected and guarded for my ancestors, the gods, in the hope that they will be contented, by doing what their ka's wish while they protect Egypt.

Generally, Tutankhamun is referred to as the author of the Restoration Stela, overseeing its composition, meaning that that first person usage is self-referent. An alternative interpretation is that Horemheb is the author, as a power behind the throne. However, the writing style is distinct from the writing style of the Edict of Horemheb document, known to be authored by Horemheb, which was more criminologically oriented, recording the establishment of Horemheb's new legalistic authority and penalties for criminal violations. The writing style is also distinct from the writing style of vizier Ay in his authored letters, such as in the Zannanza affair.

=== Usurpation by Horemheb ===
Notably, during Ay's brief two-year reign as pharaoh following the death of Tutankhamun, Ay did not usurp the Restoration Stela. However, as part of a standard damnatio memoriae, the next pharaoh after Ay, Horemheb, later scarcely usurped the stela during his reign, only supplanting Tutankhamun's name with his own. Egyptologist John Bennett writes:

Wherever they occur the nomen and prenomen of Tutankhamun have been erased and replaced by those of Horemheb. In many cases it is possible to distinguish the signs of Tutankhamun's name under those of Horemheb. The only untouched group in the nomina is the name of Amun. Curiously enough, the other names of Tutankhamun's titulary have not been altered.

Nozomu Kawai also points out that Ankhesenamun's name was supplanted with Horemheb's wife, Queen Mutnodjmet, noting that:

On the lunette of the Restoration Stela of Tutankhamun, which was usurped by Horemheb, her figures were completely erased and replaced by an inscription instead of changing her image to that of his [ie. Horemheb's] wife, Queen Mutnodjmet.

Horemheb's usurpation of the stela was relatively gentle, as it generally perseveres the rest of text.

== Analysis ==
Egyptologist Nozomu Kawai has analyzed the Restoration Stela concluding that it highlights four main points, each corresponding to a different stage in the restoration process:

1. Tutankhamun embellished the divine statues of Amun and the other gods of the indigenous Ancient Egypt religion, which were previously ignored or destroyed during Akhenaten’s reign.
2. Tutankhamun installed the children of influential local officials in the priesthood across the ranks.
3. Tutankhamun increased the revenue of the temples and cities including private property.
4. Tutankhamun reconsecrated male and female servants and singers and protected them from all standard requisition of temple property by the state.

== See also ==
- Counter-Reformation – Catholic response to the Protestant Reformation, 16th–17th centuries
- Edict of Horemheb – Ancient Egyptian legal text
- Annals of Thutmose III
- Inventory Stela – Ancient Egyptian commemorative tablet
- Bentresh Stela – Ancient Egyptian sandstone stela with a hieroglyphic text telling the story of Bentresh
- Ikhernofret Stela – Ancient Egyptian stela
- Stele of Piye – Egyptian archaeological artifact
- Autobiography of Weni – Ancient Egyptian official of the 6th Dynasty
- The Maxims of Ptahhotep – Ancient Egyptian literary composition by Vizier Ptahhotep
- Instructions of Kagemni – Ancient Egyptian text
- Hammurabi Code – Babylonian legal text
- Code of Ur-Nammu – Oldest surviving law code, from Mesopotamia
- Laws of Eshnunna – c. 1930 BC law code from Iraq
- Code of Lipit-Ishtar – Collection of laws promulgated by Lipit-Ishtar
- Law of Moses – Torah, or first five books of the Hebrew Bible
- Edicts of Ashoka – 3rd-century BCE inscriptions in South Asia
