= Æbbe the Younger =

Abbess of Coldingham Priory in Scotland

Saint Æbbe of Coldingham
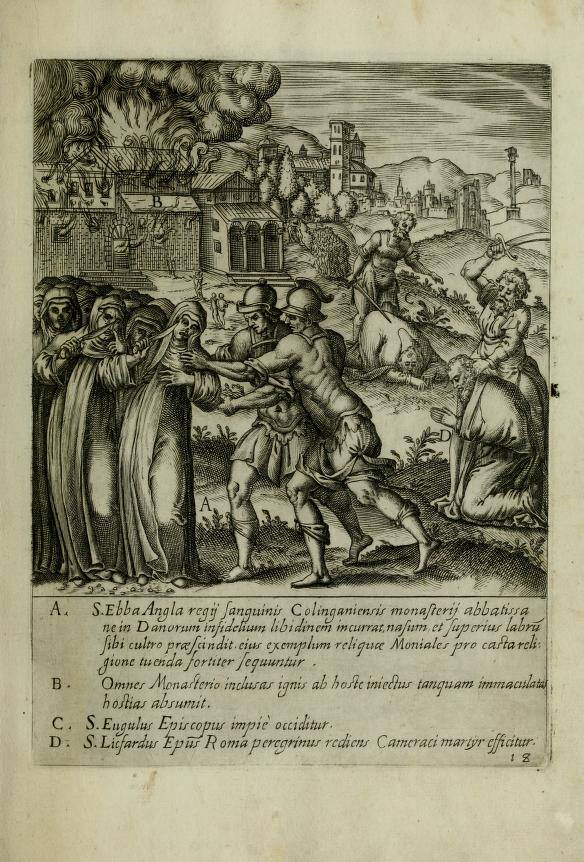
- The self-mutilation of Saint Æbbe and her community. Plate from Ecclesiae Anglicanae Trophae (1584), a collection of engravings by Giovanni Battista de'Cavalieri after murals by Niccolò Circignani in the chapel of the Venerable English College, Rome.
- Born: Unknown
- Died: 2 April 870; Coldingham Monastery, Scotland
- Canonized: Pre-Congregation
- Feast: 2 April

Saint Æbbe of Coldingham (also Ebbe, Aebbe, Abb), also known as Æbbe the Younger, (died 2 April 870) was an Abbess of Coldingham Priory in south-east Scotland.

Like many of her fellow female saints of Anglo-Saxon England, little is known about her life. She presided over the Benedictine Abbey at Coldingham.

She is best known for an act of self-mutilation to avoid rape by Viking invaders: according to a thirteenth-century chronicle, she took a razor and cut off her nose in front of the nuns, who followed her example. Their appearance so disgusted the invaders that the women were saved from rape but not from death, as the Danes soon returned and set fire to the convent, killing Æbbe and her entire community.
