= Thumbing one's nose =

Gesture of insult and defiance

A person thumbing their nose

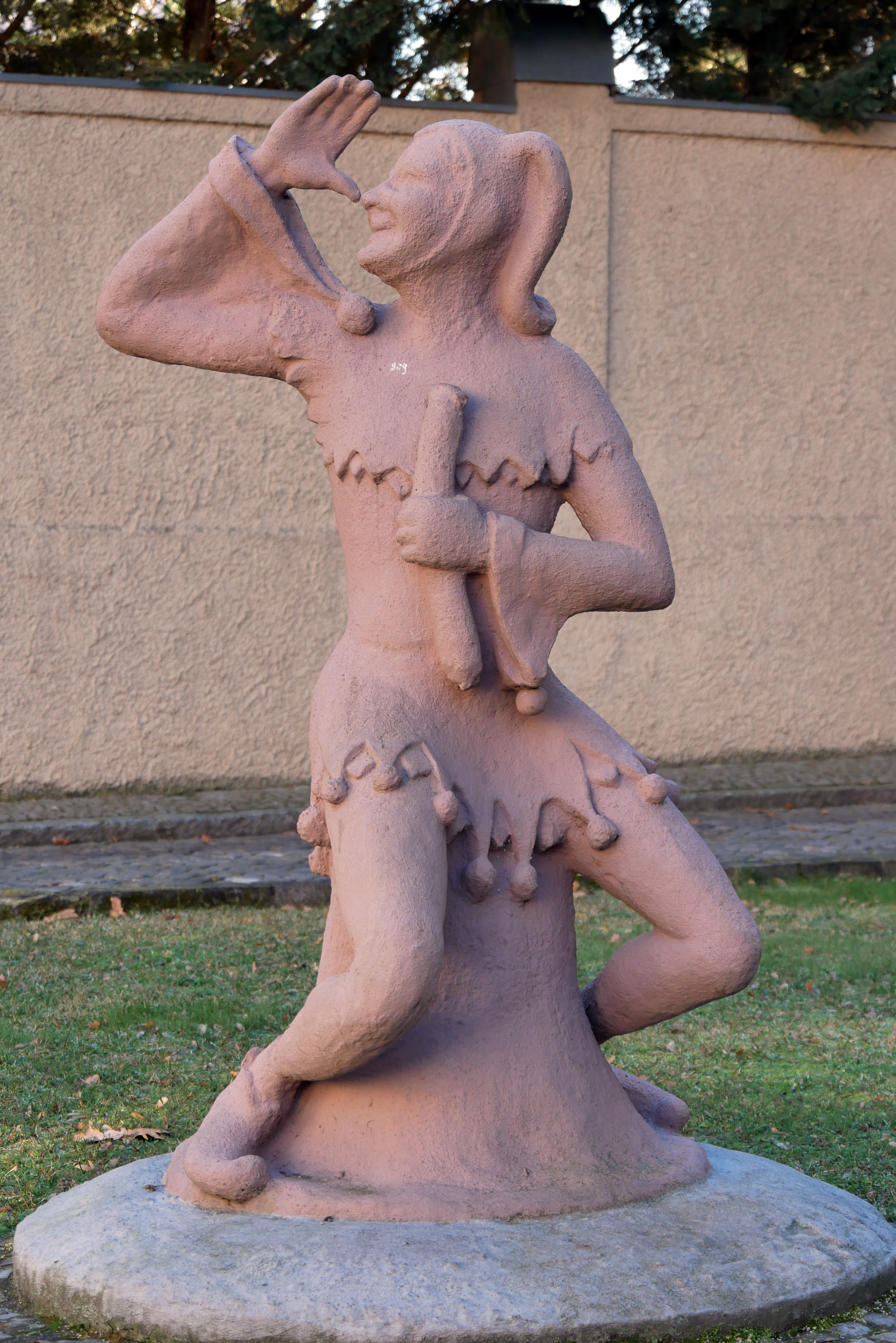
Statue of Till Eulenspiegel thumbing his nose

Thumbing one's nose, also known as cocking a snook, is a sign of derision, disrespect, contempt, or defiance, made by putting the thumb on the nose, holding the palm open and perpendicular to the face, and wiggling the remaining fingers. It is used mostly by schoolchildren. It is also known as thumbing the nose, Anne's Fan or Queen Anne's Fan.

The phrase cocking a snook can be used figuratively: the Oxford English Dictionary cites a 1938 usage by Eric Ambler in his Cause for Alarm, where he writes that the Rome–Berlin axis "cocked the biggest snook yet at the League of Nations idea".

The gesture was commonly used by Charlie Chaplin, especially in his earlier films.

== See also ==
- I've got your nose
- Mooning
- Reverse V sign
- The finger
