= Rhinotomy =

Amputation of the nose

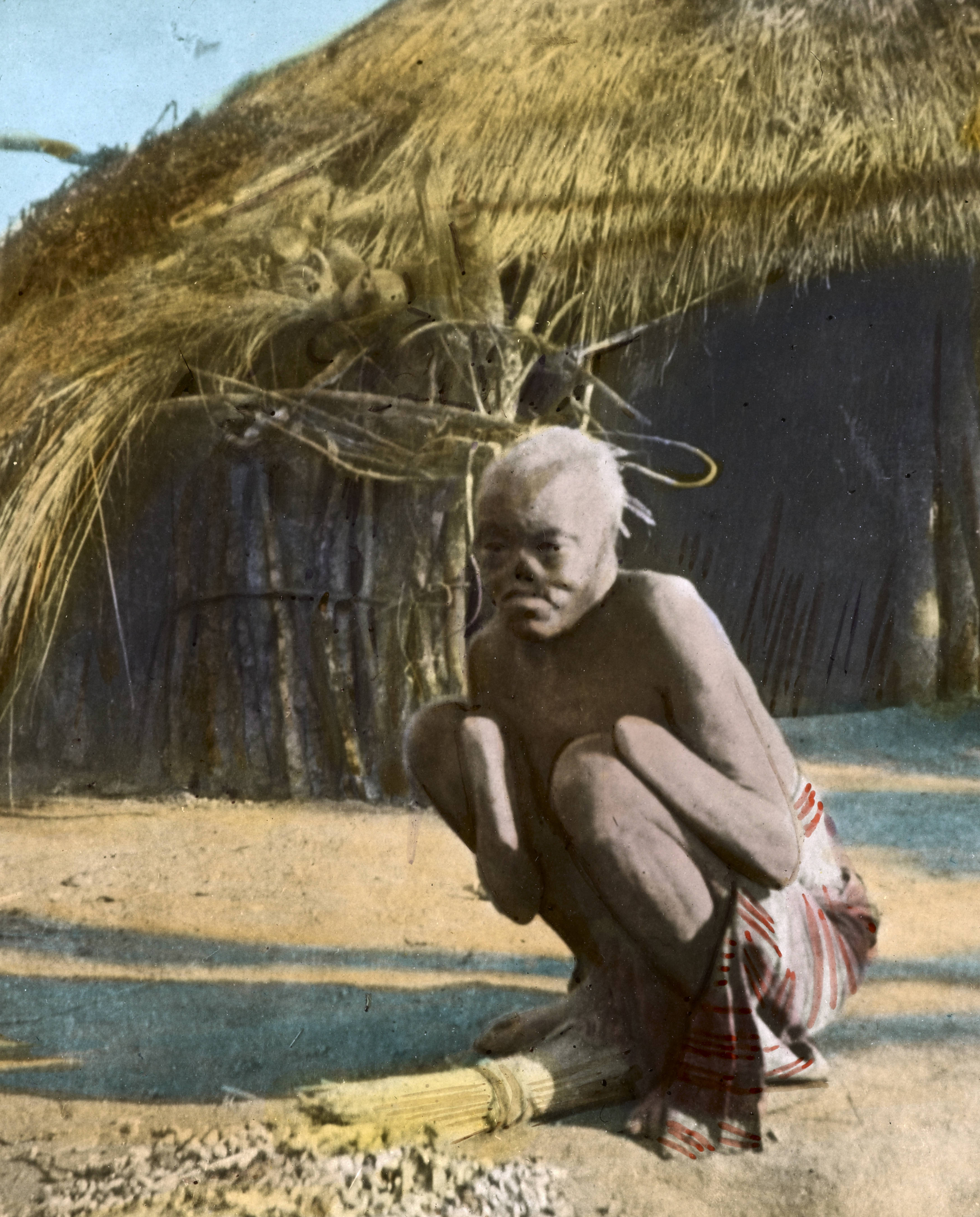
Man without nose and hands, c. 1910

Rhinotomy is mutilation, usually amputation, of the nose. It was a means of judicial punishment throughout the world, particularly for sexual transgressions, but in the case of adultery often applied only to women.

== Ancient usage ==
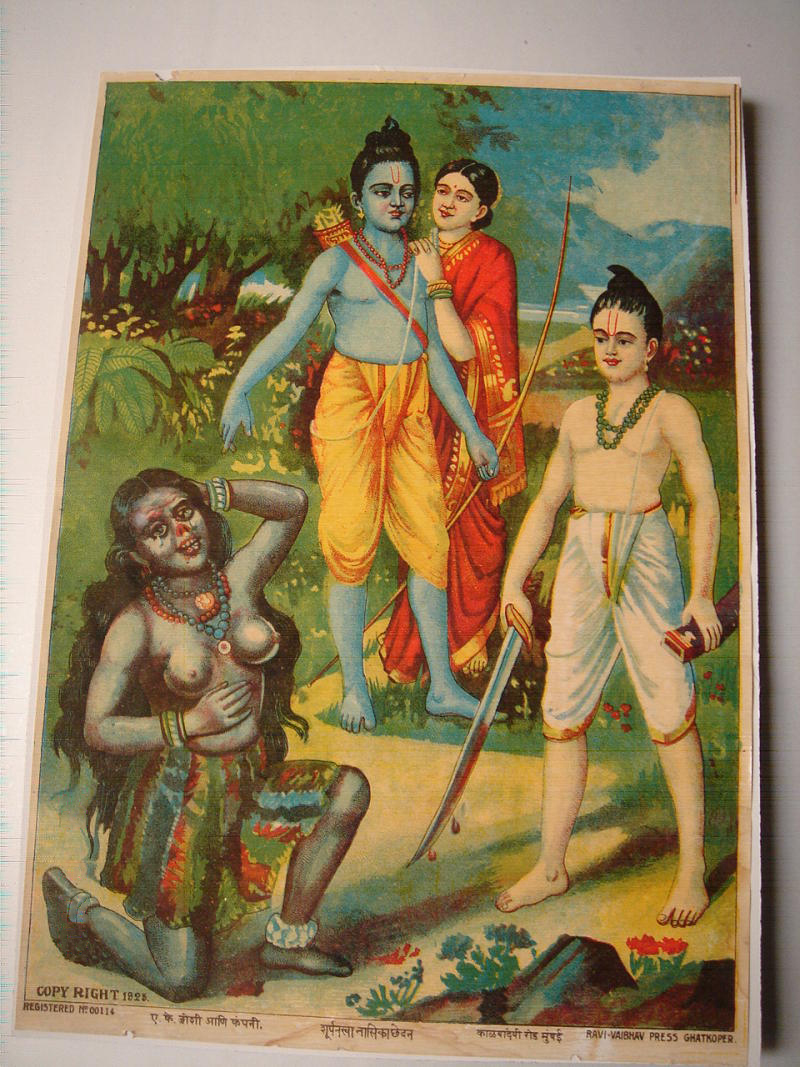
Print of Hindu scene: Shurpanakha (blue woman in foreground) has had her nose cut off by Lakshmana (with sword).

The Code of Hammurabi contains references to amputation of bodily protrusions (such as lips, nose, breasts, etc.), as do the laws of ancient Egypt, and in Hindu medicine the writings of Charaka and the Sushruta Samhita.

Ancient Egyptian pharaoh, Horemheb, authored a legal text, the Edict of Horemheb, which frequently stated rhinotomy as a criminal punishment.

Rhinotomy as a punishment for adultery was customary in early India, and practised by the Greeks and Romans, but only rarely; the practice was more prevalent in Byzantium and among the Arabs, where the unfaithful woman was subjected to it while the man could get away with a flogging—and "often the husband whose wife had been unfaithful was instructed to act as executioner".

== Middle Ages ==
Emperor of the Romans Justinian II had his nose removed by the general who deposed him. He returned with an army of barbarians to reclaim his throne, becoming known as "Rhinotmetos" (ὁ Ῥινότμητος, "the slit-nosed"), before replacing it with a golden replica. In Western Europe, Merovingian king Childebert II, following the customs of his Byzantine allies, condemned conspirators to rhinotomy, according to Gregory of Tours, and exposing them to ridicule.

In 1120, the Council of Nablus established that women who were found committing adultery in the Kingdom of Jerusalem would be punished with a rhinotomy. It also established the rhinotomy as the punishment for Christian women who had consensual sexual relationships with Muslim men and Muslim women who had consensual sexual relationships with Christian men. The implementation of this punishment is thought to have come from traditional Byzantine punishments.

The 12th-century lay "Bisclavret" by Marie de France has a werewolf bite off his unfaithful wife's nose. Geoffroy IV de la Tour Landry's 14th-century manual The Book of the Knight of the Tower has an example of a knight breaking his wife's nose, as an injunction for women to obey their husbands.

Frederick II used the practice to punish adulterers and panderers.

In 14th and 15th-century Poland, rhinotomy (as well as glossectomy) was used to punish crimes committed through speech. The practice is reported in 15th-century Naples.

German surgeon Wilhelm Fabry describes a case from 1590 in which a woman ("Susanne the Chaste") resisted rape and had her nose cut off as a result.

== Self-inflicted ==
Most known cases of self-inflicted rhinotomy concern nuns who mutilated their noses in hopes of avoiding rape. The nuns of the Saint-Cyr monastery in Marseille, in the 9th century, were spared rape but were all killed, and the nuns of the Saint Clare abbey in Acri suffered the same fate in 1291. Such a story is told also of Æbbe the Younger and her nuns at Coldingham, in the 9th century.

== See also ==
- I've got your nose
- Nose tomb, 16th-century Japanese tombs containing amputated noses from Korean soldiers and civilians
  - Mimizuka, the best-known such shrine, containing at least 38,000 noses
- Political mutilation in Byzantine culture
- Rhinoplasty – Surgical procedure to enhance or reconstruct a human nose
- Violence against women
