= Fig sign =

Offensive hand gesture

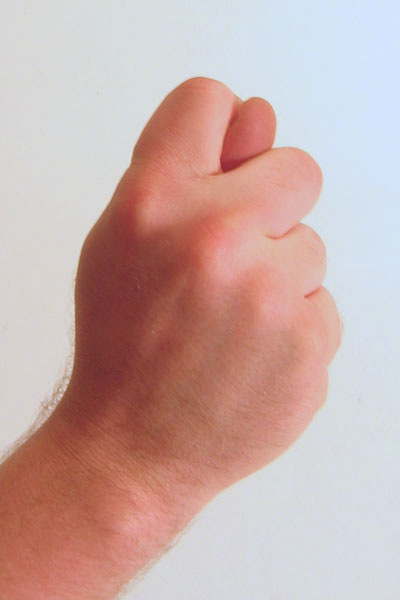
The fig sign

The fig sign is a mildly obscene gesture that uses a thumb wedged in between two fingers. The gesture is most commonly used to ward off the evil eye, insult someone, or deny a request. It has been used at least since the Roman Age in Southern Europe and parts of the Mediterranean region, including in Turkish culture. Some countries in Asia, Slavic cultures and South Africa use it too. It is used playfully in Northwestern Europe and North Africa, countries such as the US, Canada, Australia, Libya, Tunisia and Czech Republic to pretend to take the nose off a child.

The letter "T" in the American manual alphabet is very similar to this gesture.

== Historical usage ==
Among early Christians, it was known as the manus obscena, or 'obscene hand'.

In ancient Rome, the fig sign, or manus fica, was made by the pater familias to ward off the evil spirits of the dead as a part of the Lemuria ritual. It is contextually interesting and worth noting that the fig was a sacred plant for the Romans, especially through the Ficus Ruminalis (Fig of Rumina), a wild fig tree whose life was believed to be critical to the luck of Rome (e.g. its rot and then alleged regrowth during Nero's early reign.)

The ancient Greeks wore amulets of the gesture around the neck to protect from the evil eye, and also used the gesture in artwork. What they considered an overtly sexual gesture was expected to distract evil spirits from causing harm.

The word sycophant comes from the Ancient Greek word συκοφάντης (sykophántēs), meaning "one who shows or reveals figs"; though there is no unequivocal explanation as to the reason why sycophants in Ancient Greece were so called, one explanation is that the sycophant, by making false accusations, insulted the defendant in a manner analogous to making the fig sign.

In Italy, this sign, known as fica in mano ('fig-hand'), or far le fiche ('to make the fig'), was a common and very rude gesture in past centuries, similar to the finger, but has long since fallen out of use. Notably, a remnant of its usage is found in Dante's Divine Comedy (Inferno, Canto XXV), and it is commonly represented in medieval paintings of the Man of Sorrow.

The same hand shape is now frequently used as a joke with children, along with the phrase "I've got your nose". In this context it bears no offensive or sexual meaning.

== International nomenclature ==
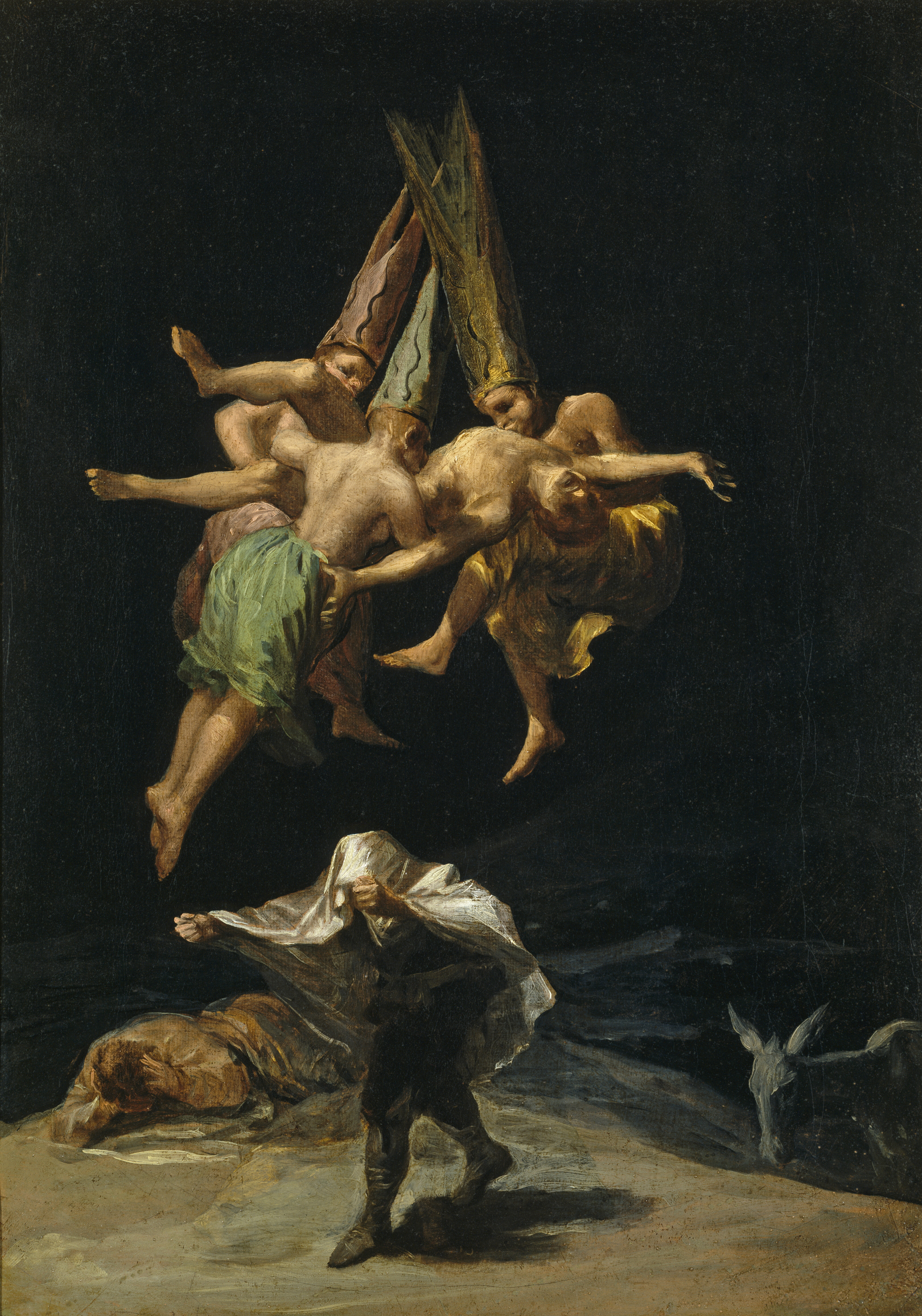
Goya, Witches' Flight. A man folds his fingers into fig sign as a protective gesture.

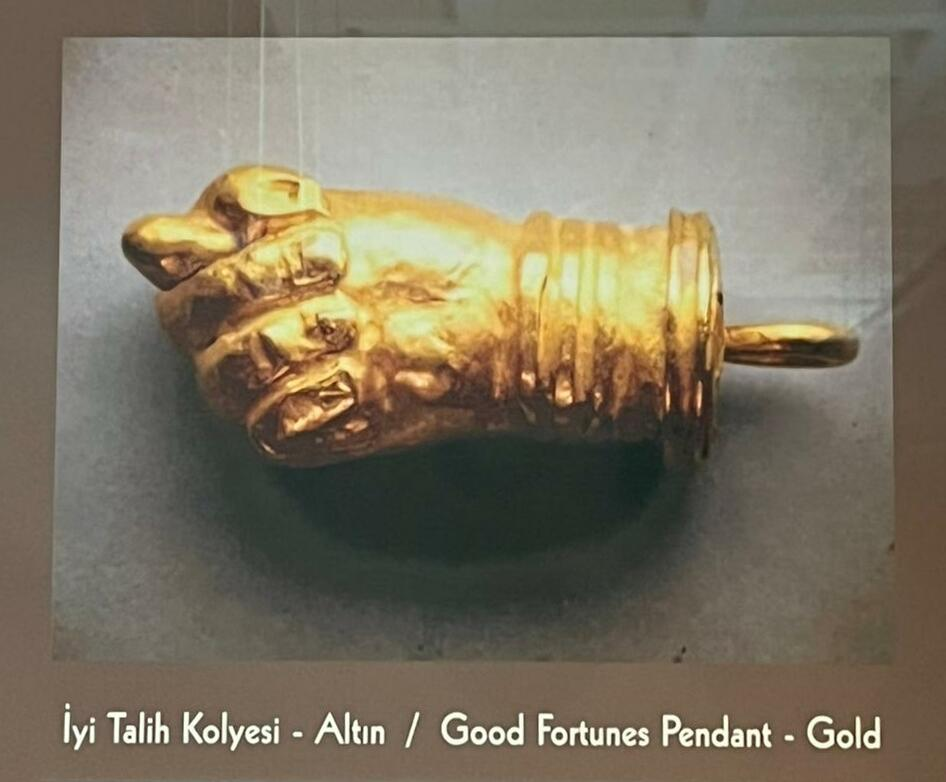
A golden good fortunes pendant shaped as a fig sign from Hellenistic Period (Eskişehir Archaeology Museum)

=== Derogatory ===
- In Greece and particularly in the Ionian Islands, this gesture is still used as an alternative to the moutza. It is known as a "fist-phallus", and can be accompanied by extending the right hand while clasping the left hand under one's armpit in a derogatory manner.
- In Carinthia, it is used to derisively dismiss the size of a man's genitalia.
- In South Africa, it was once known as "the zap sign" and was the equivalent of giving the finger. The sign is nowadays known as the "toffee sign", particularly in Afrikaans culture.
- In Madagascar, the gesture is an insult referring to one's mother's genitalia.
- In Romania and Moldova, the gesture is an insult often referring to "Hai sictir" which means "shut up" or "fuck off."
- In Mongolia, the gesture is called "salaavch" (Mongolian: Салаавч) and means "between the gap". Oftentimes one would say "may!" (Mongolian: май!) meaning something along the line of "get this" or "here you go." Sometimes one could spit at the fig shape before showing it. It is considered to evoke the shape of female genitals and thus has insulting connotations.

=== Sexual ===
- In Indonesia, it is a gesture symbol for sexual intercourse. Where the thumb represent the male genitalia, the middle and index finger act as the female genitalia, this is to replicate the penetration of the male genitalia into the female genitalia. This hand gesture is still popular especially among men.
- In Japan, this sign is called セックス (sekkusu) and means sex.
- In Belgium, Denmark and Germany the gesture is used as an invitation to sex.

=== As disagreement or dismissal ===
- In Armenia, annoyance or disobedience to fulfill a request can be shown with the fig sign. It can also have a sexual meaning, and can even be used as a way to say "Fuck you!".
- In Azerbaijan, it is considered as a rude gesture indicating disagreement and sometimes showing sexual undertones. This gesture is accompanied by the expression Zırt!
- In Russia, Belarus and Ukraine, the sign is also called shish, kukish or dulya (Russian: шиш, Ukrainian: дуля). It is considered rude and conveys refusal with a sense of absoluteness and finality. The expression fig tebe! ("fig to you!") is also used in place of the gesture.
- In Poland, it is used to express refusal to a request. The use of the gesture is referred to as showing someone a fig and may be accompanied with the rhyming phrase figa z makiem, z pasternakiem (lit. "fig with poppyseed, with parsnips"), sometimes in the form of a defiant statement "you'll get a fig (with poppyseed, with parsnips)" in full or in an abbreviated form.
- In Slovakia, it is used to express "nothing at all" or as refusal to a request, usually accompanied by the phrase Figa borová. Although the exact reason for the usage of this phrase is uncertain, an antiquated version of the phrase, Figa drevená or "wooden fig", may link it to the Pine tree—Borovica Lesná—likely associating its seed cones with an inedible or worthless "fruit" of a tree, with its shape—as well as the shape of the gesture—resembling that of a fig.
- In Lithuania, it is called špyga and usually when using it some would say špyga taukuota. As in Russia and Poland it means denying a request and refusing to do it. It is not as commonly used now, but more by the generation born around 1950s–60s as well as their parents' generation.
- In Latvia, it is called figa and it is used by saying either figu!/figa! or figu tev, or that someone will/has gotten a figa. This expression is found among the older (Soviet) generations and those with older generation parents, and it is very rarely used nowadays.
- In Croatia, Serbia and Slovenia, it is used when denying a request or when swearing a false oath. In the request denial case it is called a fig (figa) but also a "rose hip" (Šipak / Шипак). Evo ti figa/Šipak! (here is a fig/rose hip for you!) is a slightly rude but also a humorous way of rejecting someone's request. In addition it is also used when swearing a false oath or falsifying an affirmation to tell the truth. In this case, it is said that a person is taking a false oath by hiding a fig sign in a pocket (figa u džepu).
- In Turkey, it is an obscene gesture equivalent to showing the middle finger, and is also used to show disagreement at a statement or to deny a request. In the latter sense, it is often accompanied by the (rude) nah! conveying negation or disagreement (see wiktionary:nah), or by the imperative al! meaning 'take that!', or the combination of the two: nah alırsın! meaning 'you will get nothing!' Thus, the gesture is often referred to as nah çekmek, meaning to 'draw (show) a nah'. It is used in a similar context in Bulgaria.
- In Korea, it has a likewise meaning as in Turkey as to mean, "Here, have it!", often accompanied by a gesture in which one looks through their pockets as if searching for something, later to reveal the fig sign. It is an old sign and has mostly fallen into disuse.

=== Other uses ===
- In many countries, such as the United Kingdom, Ireland, Canada, France, Germany, Spain, Czech Republic, Argentina, Uruguay, and the United States, this sign has no obscene meaning and is instead used in a game where a player "steals" someone else's nose. This is usually done with small children where the player pretends to take their nose and then say "I've got your nose". The thumb represents the "stolen" nose held between the player's index and middle finger. This innocent meaning may exist alongside the obscene one.
- In Portugal, Brazil, and some places in Spain, such as Galicia and Asturias, it is a gesture of good luck, or even wishing good luck. It is also believed to ward off evil eye and protect oneself from evil. In these countries, an amulet of a hand performing the fig sign is worn as a good luck or protective charm. In Asturias, these amulets are made from Jet, and it is usual to give them to young kids to protect them from evil eye. In Spanish language these amulets are called "Higas". In Galician language and in Portuguese language they are called "Figas", and in Asturleonese language are called "Ciguas".

== See also ==
- Apotropaic magic
