= I've got your nose =

Children's game

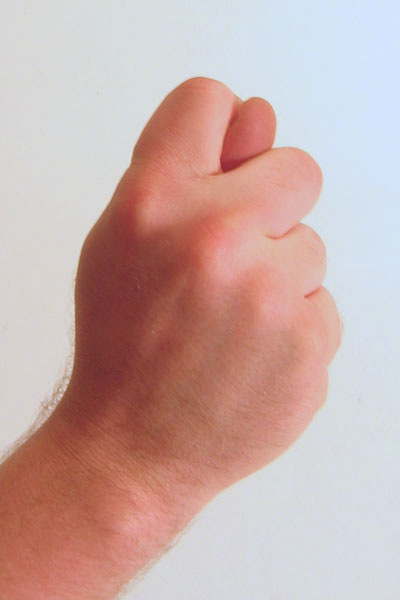
"Got your nose" hand position, with tip of thumb representing the stolen "nose". However, this "fig sign" may be interpreted as offensive or obscene in certain cultures.

I've got your nose is a children's game in which a person pretends to pluck and remove the nose from the face of a toddler by showing an object supposedly representing the stolen body part. The trick or prank is meant as an illusion, since a person cannot easily observe the status of their own nose.

== Description ==
Typically, the performing 'thief' of the act puts the knuckles of the index and middle fingers on either side of a child's nose. The fingers are then withdrawn from the child's face with the thumb of the 'thief' protruding between the index and middle fingers, with the thumb representing the stolen nose. This motion is often accompanied by an exclamation such as, "I've got your nose!"

The child may chase the nose thief to retrieve their nose, or, if they understand the game is a farce, may retaliate by "stealing" the first person's (or someone else's) nose. The 'nose' may then be replaced by pressing the thumb to the child's nose and withdrawing the hand, showing the child that the taker no longer possesses the child's nose.

The hand position used when stealing a nose is also known as the fig sign, which can be viewed as an offensive or obscene gesture in certain cultures such as in Japan, where it refers to copulation, or Turkey, where it is the local version of the Western "middle finger" gesture.

== Characteristics ==
This trick is commonly played by adults or older children (e.g. parents, grandparents, uncles, elder siblings) on their toddler relatives. Young children aged 2 or 3 often find the game amusing, or sometimes mildly distressing if they believe it is real. Cognitively, this is because many two- and three-year-olds have trouble recognizing that a thing may look like one thing yet be another, whereas four-year-olds are twice as likely to have that ability. The game is an example of teaching pro-social lying or playful deception to children.

Young children past toddlerhood may also play this with each other as a game of pretend; in this case they are aware that their nose is not actually being stolen.

This game is found mainly in the English-speaking world, but also exists elsewhere. For instance in France, it is known as je t'ai volé [or piqué] ton nez ! ('I stole your nose').

== See also ==
- "The Nose", 1836 short story by Nikolai Gogol about a St. Petersburg official whose nose leaves his face and develops a life of its own
- Rhinotomy, mutilation of the nose
