= Atenism =

Religion founded by Egyptian pharaoh Akhenaten

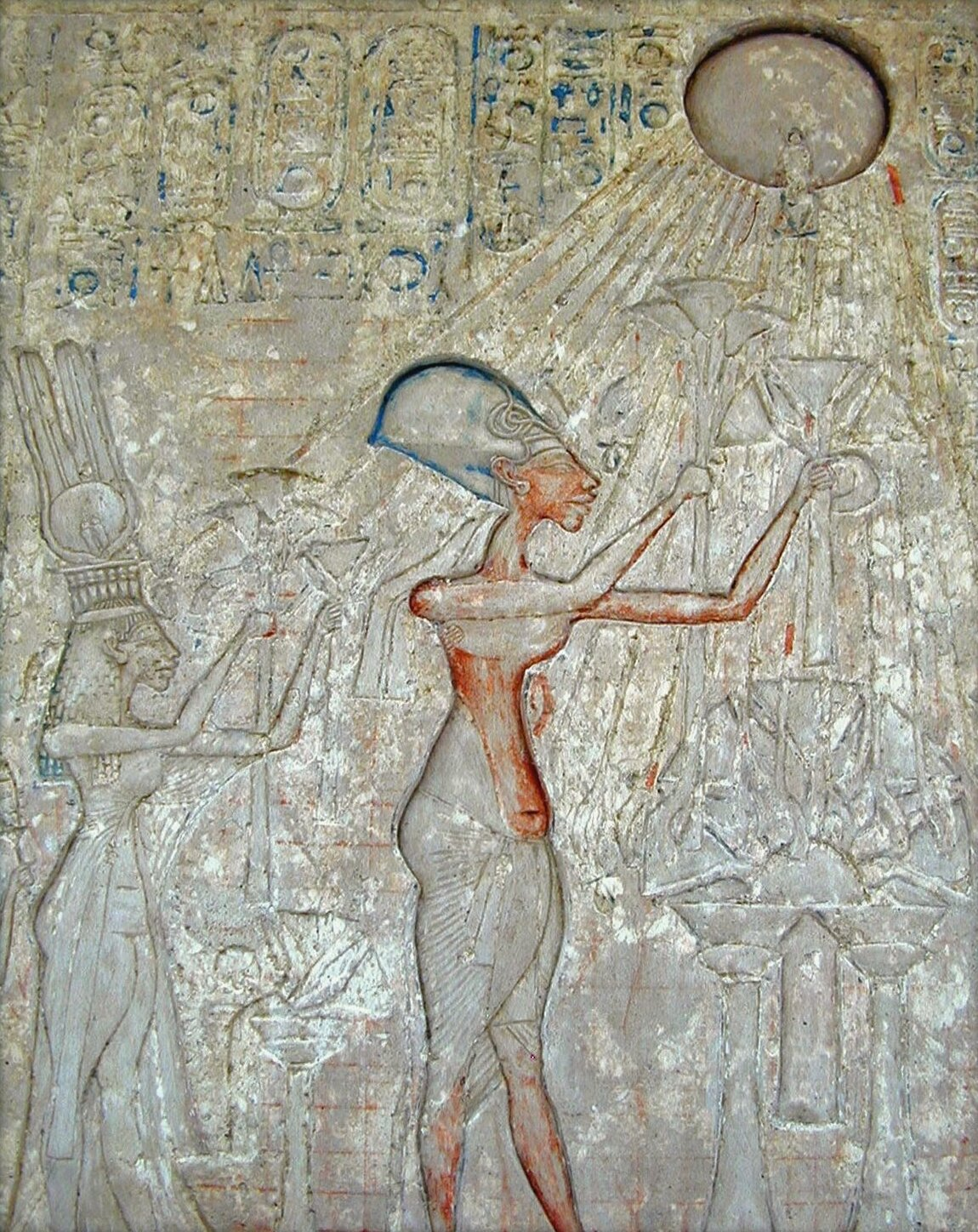
- Limestone relief at Amarna depicting Akhenaten, Nefertiti, and their children adoring Aten, c. 1372–1355 BC
- Language: Ancient Egyptian
- Headquarters: Akhetaten (Amarna)
- Founder: Akhenaten
- Origin: c. 14th century BC; Thebes, Egypt
- Separated from: Ancient Egyptian religion
- Defunct: c. 1319 BC
- Other names: Aten religion, Amarna religion, Amarna heresy

Atenism, also known as the Aten religion, the Amarna religion, and the Amarna heresy, was a religion in ancient Egypt. It was founded by Akhenaten, a pharaoh who ruled the New Kingdom under the Eighteenth Dynasty.

The religion is described as monotheistic or monolatristic, although some Egyptologists argue that it was actually henotheistic. Atenism was centered on the cult of Aten, a god depicted as the disc of the Sun. Aten was originally an aspect of Ra, Egypt's traditional solar deity, though he was later asserted by Akhenaten as being the supreme of all deities.

In the 14th century BC, Atenism was Egypt's state religion for around 20 years, and Akhenaten met the worship of other gods with persecution; he closed many traditional temples, instead commissioning the construction of Atenist temples, and also suppressed religious traditionalists. However, subsequent pharaohs toppled the movement in the aftermath of Akhenaten's death, thereby restoring Egyptian civilization's traditional polytheistic religion. Large-scale efforts were then undertaken to remove from Egypt and Egyptian records any presence or mention of Akhenaten, Atenist temples, and assertions of a uniquely supreme god.

== History ==
=== Solar religion before Akhenaten ===
The traditional form of ancient Egyptian religion was polytheistic, encompassing hundreds of deities. The Egyptians defined these gods by describing their relationships and interactions with one another. As the Egyptologist Jan Assmann put it, "a deity was not conceivable without reference to other deities". The relationships between deities were often expressed through mythological imagery. For instance, the movement of the sun through the sky was often envisioned as a divine king, the sun god Ra, sailing through the heavens in a barque, accompanied by subordinate deities who served as his crew and defended the barque against the forces of chaos. Deities might also be linked, or syncretized, with each other to represent the overlap in their roles. Ra was often syncretized with the sky god Horus as Ra-Horakhty, representing the sun at the horizon, or with the creator god Atum, reflecting Egyptian creation myths, in which the creation of the world coincided with the rising of the sun.

The gods were worshipped in temples in cities across Egypt, and the chief deity of a city's main temple was considered the city's patron deity. Making offerings to the gods, and therefore managing the temples where the offerings took place, was one of the core duties of the pharaoh, the king of Egypt. Over the course of Egyptian history, the more significant temples became major landholders, their activities supported by vast estates worked by thousands of people. These estates were ultimately under royal control, and a king could have a major effect on the economy by revising the distribution of temple resources.

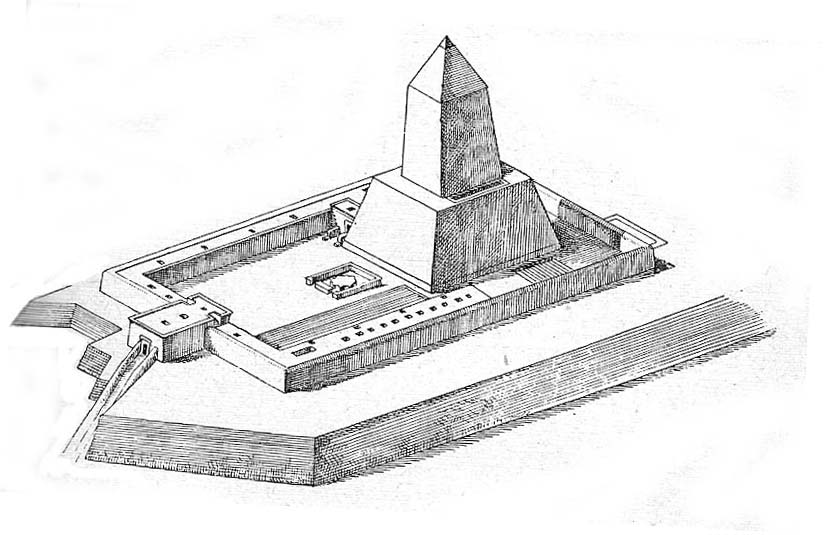
Reconstruction of the sun temple of Nyuserre Ini, twenty-fifth century BC

Over the history of ancient Egypt, deities shifted in their prominence relative to each other. During the Old Kingdom (c. 2686–2181 BC), Ra was the foremost deity. The ideology surrounding Ra, in which the sun god was the father of the pharaoh, became integral to Egyptian kingship, and many Old Kingdom rulers incorporated Ra's name into their own. Whereas other deities were believed to manifest themselves in cult statues in enclosed sanctuaries within temples, Ra's temples and shrines centered on open-air courts, where the focus of worship was either the sun itself or a sacred stone known as the benben. The original temple of this type was at Ra's cult center of Heliopolis in Lower Egypt. Several rulers in the Fifth Dynasty in the late Old Kingdom built their own sun temples, centering on massive obelisks that may have been modeled on the benben of Heliopolis. Many Egyptologists therefore see the Fifth Dynasty as the peak of Ra's worship.

Ra remained one of the most important deities in the pantheon even after the Old Kingdom, and many other major deities developed syncretistic links with him. During the Middle Kingdom (c. 2055–1650 BC), rulers from Thebes in Upper Egypt elevated that city's patron deity, Amun, to national prominence, syncretizing him with Ra as Amun-Ra. Amun was considered a mysterious, unknowable deity, but the theology of Amun-Ra made Ra the visible face of Amun's hidden power.

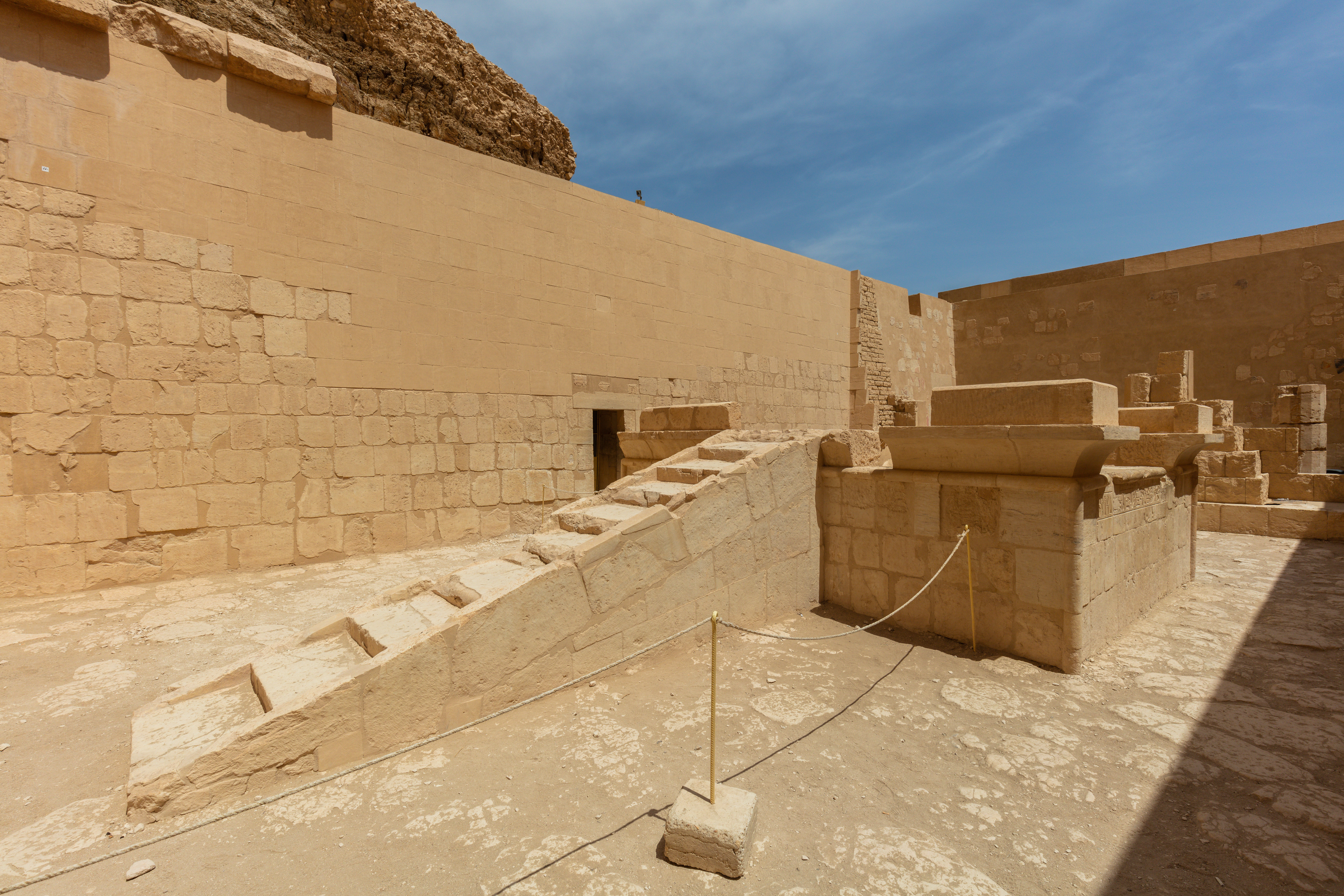
Open-air sun chapel and altar in the mortuary temple of Hatshepsut, fifteenth century BC

Amun assumed even more importance early in the New Kingdom (c. 1550–1070 BC), when the rulers of the Eighteenth Dynasty (c. 1550–1292 BC) conquered large areas of Nubia, Canaan, and Syria and poured much of the wealth from these conquests into temples, especially Amun's main temple at Karnak in Thebes. Thutmose III, for instance, made many additions to Karnak that emphasized Amun's link with the sun, and Thebes itself became known as the "Heliopolis of Upper Egypt".

Some texts from the early New Kingdom, before the emergence of Atenism, characterize Amun-Ra in a novel way, which Assmann dubbed the "new solar theology". In these texts, primarily hymns found in tombs of the period, the sun god's actions in the daily movement through the sky are characterized as his alone, ignoring the deities who were traditionally said to assist him. The hymns stressed that the sun's light gave life to all living things, and in the multiethnic empire of the New Kingdom, even foreign peoples—traditionally considered agents of chaos in Egyptian ideology—could be thought of as the subjects of the sun god's beneficent rule.

At the same time, another term for the sun god was growing increasingly prominent. The word jtn, or "aten", originally referred to a circle or a disk and, in the Coffin Texts near the beginning of the Middle Kingdom, began to be used specifically for the disk of the sun. It was originally treated as an inanimate object, in contrast with the sun god, who was thought of as sitting within or shining through the Aten. But the Aten increasingly came to be treated as a deity, and in the early New Kingdom solar hymns, it was increasingly closely connected with the sun god, whether Ra or Amun.

The Aten attained particular importance under Amenhotep III, who reigned for 38 years in the early fourteenth century BC, when Egypt was at a peak of power and prosperity. Amenhotep's personal name means "Amun is satisfied", and while he built monuments to many deities across Egypt, he especially concentrated on Amun's temples in Thebes. At the same time, he used, even more frequently than most pharaohs, royal titles that connected him with the sun god. One of his most-used titles was a novel one: aten-tjehen or "the dazzling sun disk". After the first of his sed festivals, a ritual that took place after 30 years on the throne and at three-year intervals afterward, Amenhotep began to be portrayed in ways that seem to indicate he had divine status while still living. Some Egyptologists have interpreted this evidence as proclaiming him to be a solar deity: the king united with the sun god.

=== Atenism under Akhenaten ===
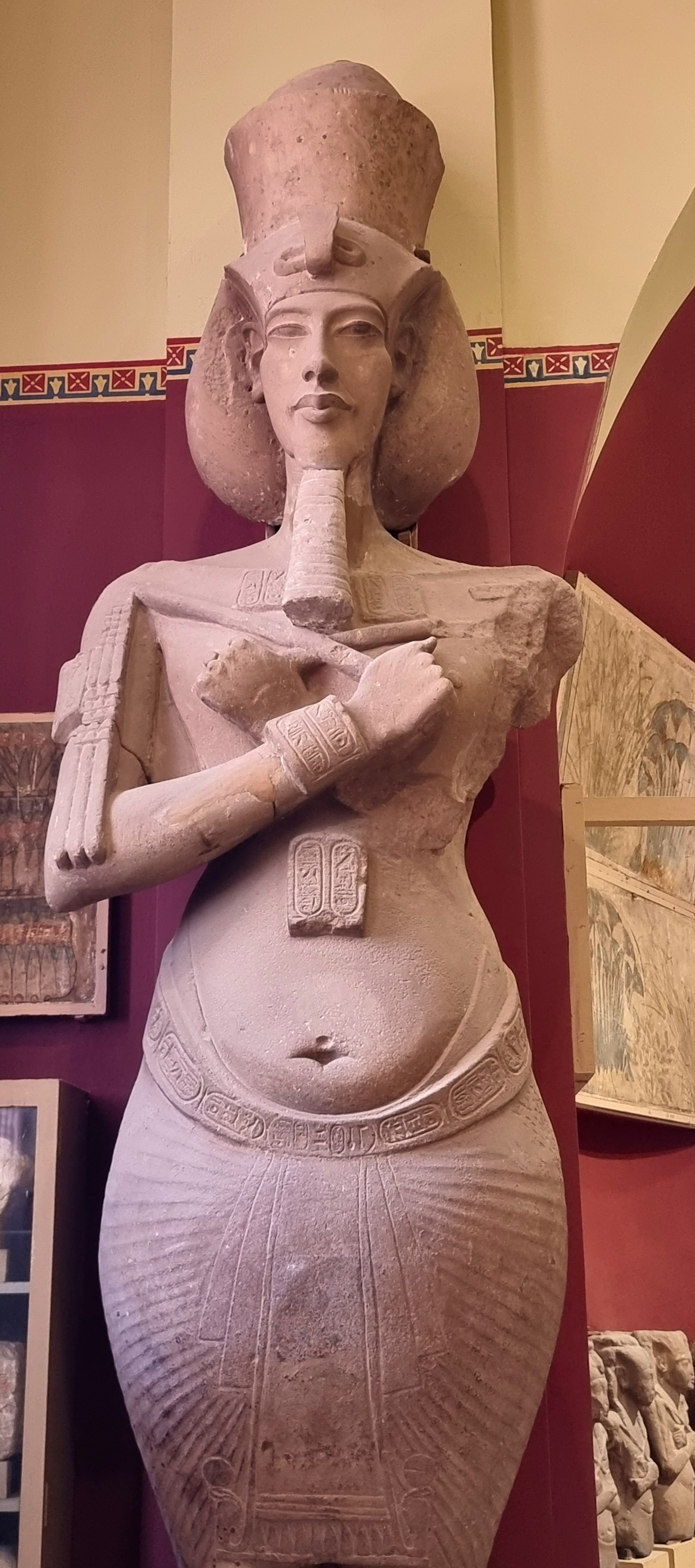
Colossal statue of Amenhotep IV (Akhenaten) from the temple of the Aten at Karnak

Amenhotep IV, the son of Amenhotep III, was crowned king c. 1353 BC. Some Egyptologists have argued that Amenhotep IV spent several years as coregent alongside his father, although this hypothesis is increasingly considered obsolete. In the set of royal names he adopted upon his accession, the new king made no mention of Amun except in his preexisting personal name, and texts from the first years of his reign acknowledge Amun but give greater prominence to the Aten, which they treat as synonymous with the sun god.

Amenhotep IV's first royal building project was a new temple at Karnak dedicated to this deity, who was referred to in its inscriptions as both Ra-Horakhty and Aten. The temple was decorated in a new art style, today known as Amarna art, that emphasized movement and portrayed human figures, especially the king's own, with exaggerated proportions. While the temple was still being decorated, possibly in Year 3 of Amenhotep's reign, the Aten began to be given a pair of names enclosed in cartouches, similar to the names of a pharaoh, and the Aten began to be portrayed by a sun disk with rays, instead of the falcon-headed man found in the earliest depictions. Around this time or shortly afterward, Amenhotep celebrated a sed festival, despite not having reigned for the traditional 30 years. Whereas a normal sed festival entailed offerings to many deities, during his festival Amenhotep IV made offerings to the Aten alone.

Resources were diverted from older temples to fund the construction of the new Aten temple, and a tomb inscription from early in the king's reign implies that the Aten was given far more offerings than other deities. But the temples of traditional deities continued to function at least as late as Year 5 of the reign, when an official in the city of Memphis wrote to the king to say that all the gods in the temples there had been given their offerings.

In that year, the king adopted a new set of names, referring to no deities except Ra and the Aten and replacing even his personal name with "Akhenaten", meaning something like "effective spirit (akh) of the Aten". The name change coincided with the founding of a new capital, Akhet-aten or "Horizon of the Aten" in Middle Egypt, now known by the modern name of the site, Amarna. The site gave its name to the Amarna Period, the term often applied to Akhenaten's entire reign and those of his immediate successors. The city centered on two temples to the Aten and the major palace, on the east bank of the Nile.

Akhenaten made other cultural changes alongside his religious ones. Amarna art was more emotional and expressive than conventional Egyptian art, placing new emphasis on the king's family—especially his Great Royal Wife, Nefertiti—and showing them in scenes of everyday life. Royal decrees began to use a dialect closer to the language of common speech, Late Egyptian, as opposed to the archaic and formal Middle Egyptian used in previous reigns. In the words of the Egyptologist James P. Allen, "All of these changes reflect Akhenaten’s emphasis on the visible, tangible, here-and-now rather than the more spiritual and timeless forms of traditional Egyptian art."

Many of the key developments in Atenism are difficult to date. At some point, workmen began chiseling out the names and images of Amun and other deities in reliefs and inscriptions across the country. Sometime after Year 8—often dated to Year 9, although some Egyptologists put it as late as Year 14—the two names of the Aten were reformulated, removing the names of the gods Ra-Horakhty and Maat, as well as a word for "light" (šw) that was a homophone for the name of the air god Shu.

=== Under later pharaohs ===
Akhenaten died in Year 17 of his reign. Two other pharaohs appeared near the end of his reign, one or both of whom may have served as coregents with him: Smenkhkare and Neferneferuaten. Neferneferuaten was a woman and is often thought to have been Nefertiti raised to pharaonic status. (Note: Smenkhkare and Neferneferuaten used the same throne name, Ankhkheperure, leading some scholars to treat them as the same person, but Neferneferuaten used the epithet "effective for her husband" while Smenkhkare was married to Akhenaten's daughter Meritaten, so many scholars regard them as distinct individuals.) A graffito from Thebes shows that Neferneferuaten reigned at least three years. This graffito was left by a "scribe of the divine offerings of Amun" in the temple of a king (either Smenkhkare or Neferneferuaten). The text is often taken to indicate that the cult of Amun had been restored by that time, and thus that the court began moving away from Akhenaten's religious exclusivity either toward the end of his reign or after his death.

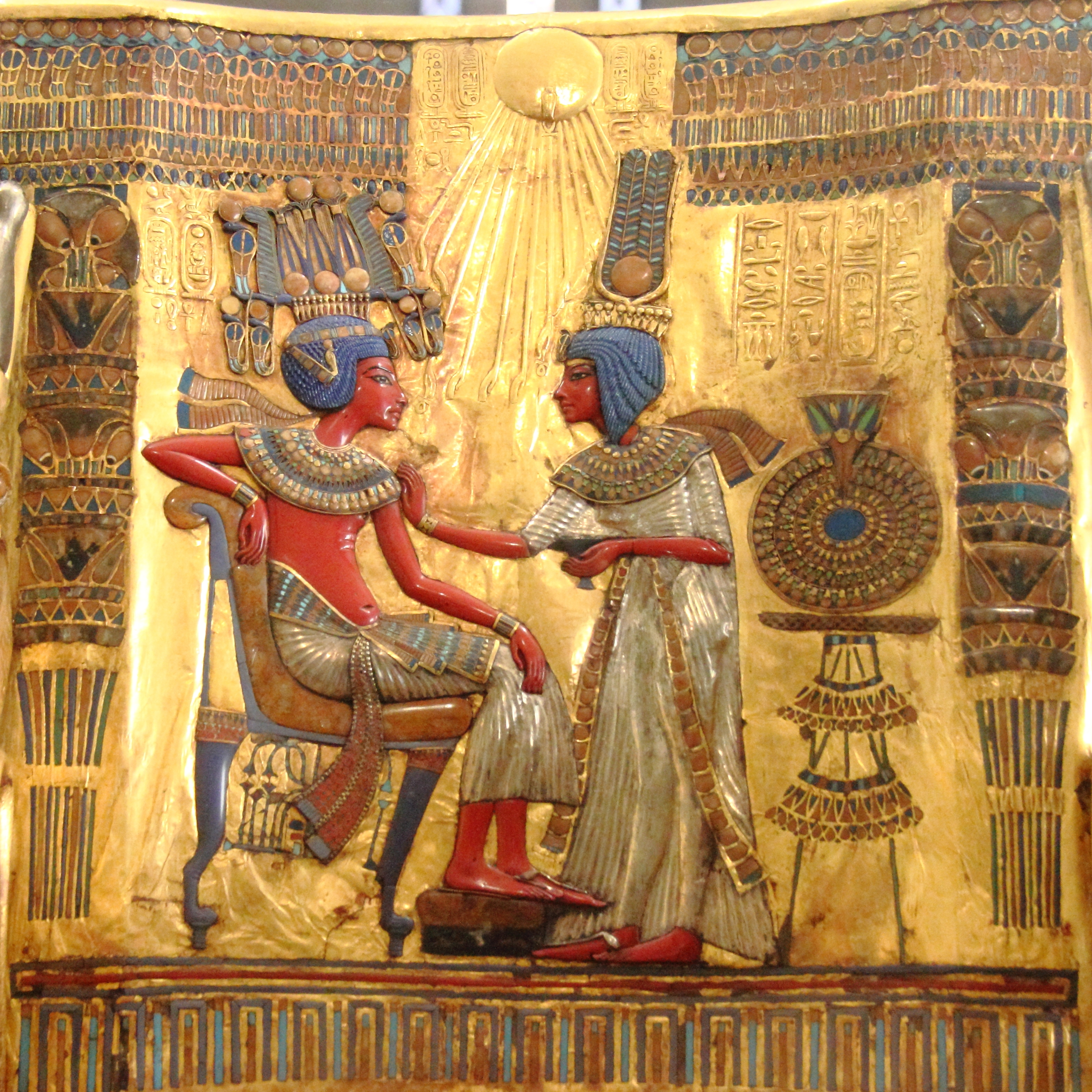
Backrest of a throne of Tutankhamun, portraying him and his queen Ankhesenamun beneath the rays of the Aten

A more explicit return to tradition took place under the next king, Tutankhaten, who came to the throne as a child and was probably Akhenaten's son. In the early years of his reign, presumably guided by adult advisors, Tutankhaten changed his name to Tutankhamun and issued a decree, now known as the Restoration Stela, denouncing the decay of the temples of the traditional gods and proclaiming his donations to restore them. Activity at Amarna gradually decreased as the functions of government moved back to Memphis and Thebes, the traditional centers of power.

Some of the burial goods from Tutankhamun's tomb indicate that worship of the Aten survived in some form for at least part of his reign. A throne from the tomb portrays Tutankhamun and his queen Ankhesenamun in the Amarna art style beneath the rays of the Aten. Inscriptions on the throne give both forms of the king's name—"Tutankhaten" and "Tutankhamun"—indicating that the throne was created near the beginning of his reign and was adapted as his policies changed. A sceptre from the tomb bears an inscription mentioning both the Aten and Amun, implying an attempt to integrate the two religious systems. But some dismantling of Akhenaten's monuments must have taken place under Tutankhamun, as blocks from the Aten temple at Karnak were used as interior fill in Tutankhamun's own constructions at Thebes.

Tutankhamun died young and without children, and the throne passed to two of his advisors: first Ay, who had been an important figure in the courts of Akhenaten and Tutankhamun, and then Horemheb, who had been a military leader under Tutankhamun. There is little evidence about the cult of the Aten during their reigns. Fragments of monuments inscribed by Horemheb have been found at the Great Temple of the Aten, but ultimately he accelerated the demolition of Akhenaten's monuments across Egypt, so that both Amarna and the Aten temples elsewhere were erased within a few generations. Official king-lists from later times ignored every ruler between Amenhotep III and Horemheb, and when later texts had to date events specifically to Akhenaten's reign, they called it "the rebellion" or "the time of the enemy of Akhet-aten".

== Contrast with traditional Egyptian religion ==
Akhenaten carried out a radical program of religious reform. For about twenty years, he largely supplanted the age-old beliefs and practices of the Egyptian state religion, and deposed its religious hierarchy, headed by the powerful priesthood of Amun at Thebes. For fifteen centuries, the Egyptians had worshiped an extended family of gods and goddesses, each of which had its own elaborate system of priests, temples, shrines and rituals. A key feature of the cults was the veneration of images and statues of the gods, which were worshipped in the dark confines of the temples.

The pinnacle of the religious hierarchy was the Pharaoh, both king and living god. The administration of the Egyptian kingdom was thus inextricably bound up with and largely controlled by the power and influence of the priests and scribes. Akhenaten's reforms cut away both the philosophical and economic bases of priestly power, abolishing the cults of all other deities and, with them, the large and lucrative industry of sacrifices and tributes that the priests controlled.

At the same time, he strengthened the role of the Pharaoh. Dominic Montserrat, analyzing the various versions of the hymns to the Aten, argues that all versions of the hymns focus on the king; he suggests that the real innovation is to redefine the relationship of god and king in a way that benefited Akhenaten, quoting a statement of Egyptologist John Baines: "Amarna religion was a religion of god and king, or even of king first and then god".

Initially, Akhenaten presented Aten to the Egyptian people as a variant of the familiar supreme deity Amun-Ra (itself the result of an earlier rise to prominence of the cult of Amun, resulting in Amun becoming merged with the sun god Ra), in an attempt to put his ideas in a familiar religious context. 'Aten' is the name given to the solar disc, and the god's full title on boundary steles of the new capital was "Ra-Horus, who rejoices in the horizon in his name of the light which is in the sun disc".

However, in the ninth year of his reign, Akhenaten declared a more radical version of his new religion by declaring Aten not merely the supreme god but the only god, and Akhenaten as the son of Aten was the only intermediary between the Aten and his people. He ordered the defacing of Amun's temples throughout Egypt. Key features of Atenism included a ban on idols and other images of the Aten, with the exception of a rayed solar disc in which the rays, commonly depicted as ending in hands, appear to represent the unseen spirit of Aten. Later still, even this was done away with.

== Amarna art ==
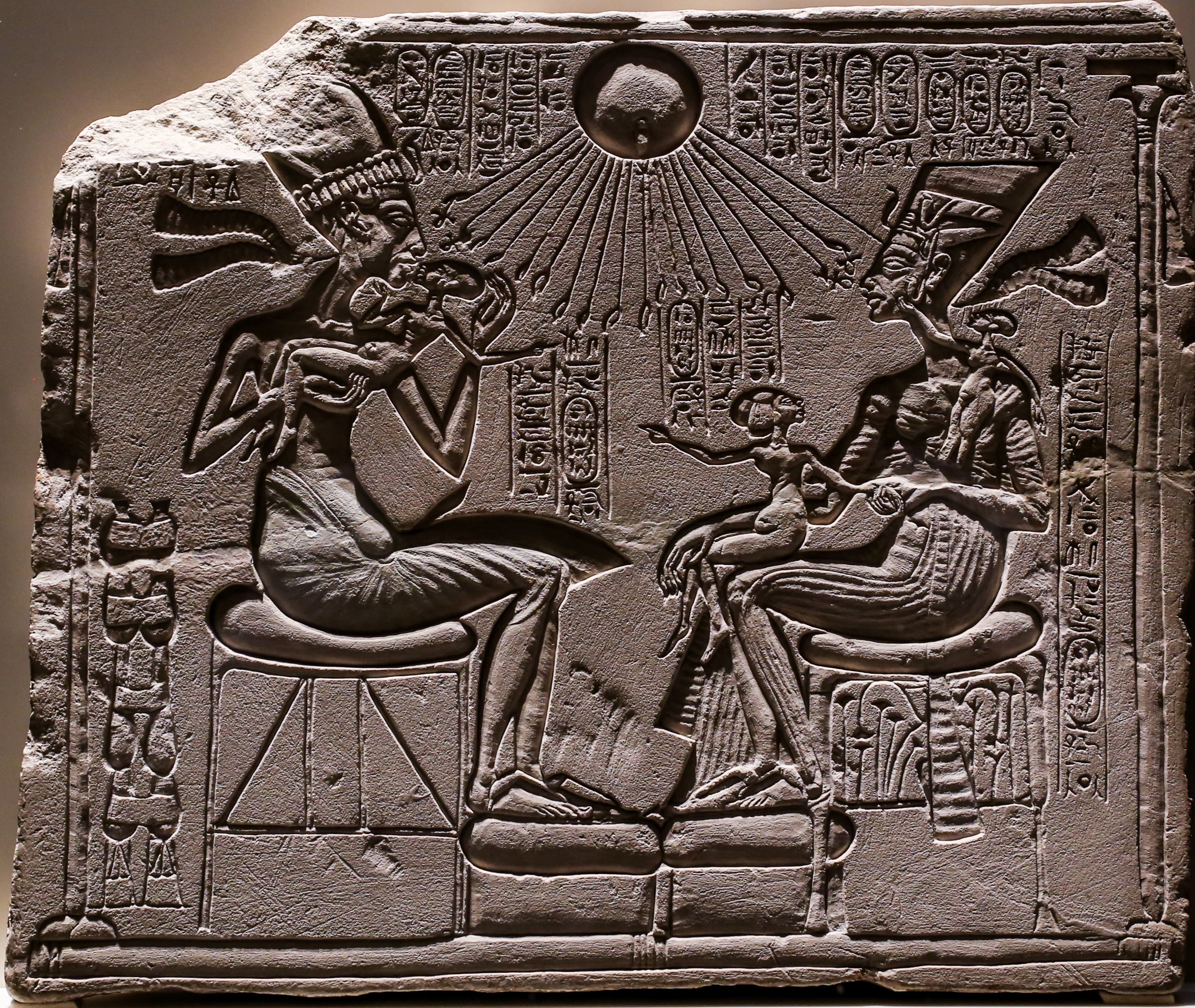
Relief depicting Akhenaten and Nefertiti with three of their daughters under the rays of Aten.

Styles of art that flourished during the brief period are markedly different from other Egyptian art. They bear a variety of affectations, from elongated heads to protruding stomachs, exaggerated ugliness, and the beauty of Nefertiti. Significantly, for the only time in the history of Egyptian royal art, Akhenaten's family was depicted in a decidedly naturalistic manner. It is clearly shown displaying affection.

Images of Akhenaten and Nefertiti usually depict the Aten prominently above that pair, with the hands of the Aten closest to each offering Ankhs. Unusually for New Kingdom art, the Pharaoh and his wife are depicted as approximately equal in size, with Nefertiti's image used to decorate the lesser Aten temple at Amarna. That may suggest that she also had a prominent official role in Aten worship.

Artistic representations of Akhenaten usually give him an unusual appearance, with slender limbs, a protruding belly and wide hips. Other leading figures of the Amarna period, both royal and otherwise, are also shown with some of these features, suggesting a possible religious connotation, especially as some sources suggest that private representations of Akhenaten, as opposed to official art, show him as quite normal. It is also suggested by Brier that the family suffered from Marfan's syndrome, which is known to cause elongated features, which may explain Akhenaten's appearance.

== Link to Abrahamic monotheism ==
Because of the monolatristic or monotheistic character of Atenism, a link to Judaism (or other monotheistic religions) has been suggested by various writers. For example, psychoanalyst Sigmund Freud assumed Akhenaten to be the pioneer of monotheistic religion and Moses as Akhenaten's follower in his book Moses and Monotheism.

The modern Druze regard their religion as being descended from and influenced by older monotheistic and mystic movements, including Atenism. In particular, they attribute the Tawhid's first public declaration to Akhenaten.

== See also ==
- Joseph and His Brothers
- Osarseph
- Kurozumikyō, a Japanese Shinto sect that exclusively worships the sun daily
- Reformation
- Counter-Reformation
