= Giovanni Battista de' Cavalieri =

Italian engraver (1526–1597)

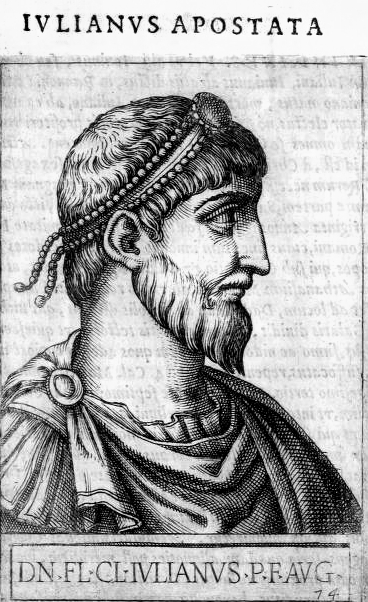
from Portraits of Roman Emperors, engraving by Giovanni Battista de'Cavalieri, 1592

Giovanni Battista de' Cavalieri (1526–1597), an Italian engraver, was born at Villa Lagarina and died at Rome. His style of engraving resembles that of Enea Vico. Many of his plates are copies after the great Italian masters; they are etched, and finished with the graver. He was very laborious, and his plates number nearly 380. The following are those most worthy of notice.

- The Frontispiece, and Heads of the Popes, for the Vite de' Pontifici.
- Thirty-three plates of the Ruins of Rome; after Dossio. 1579.
- Fifty-eight plates of the Ancient statues of Rome Antiquarum statuarum urbis Romae. 1561
- A series of plates entitled Beati Apollinaris Martyris primi Ravennatum episcopi Res gestae; after N. Circignani. 1586.
- Ecclesiae Anglicanae Trophae; after the same.
- Christ among the Doctors; supposed to be from his own design.
- The Last Supper; the same.
- The Image of the Virgin of Loreto. 1566.
- The House of Loreto, and the Miracles wrought there. 1569.
- The Jubilee in 1585, with a view of the old Church of St. Peter's.
- A Sea-fight against the Turks; for Chacon's Historia utriusque Belli Dacici, 1576.
- The Virgin, called 'Le Silence' ; after Michelangelo.
- The Dead Christ in the lap of the Virgin; after the same.
- The Conversion of St. Paul; after the same.
- The Martyrdom of St. Peter; after the same.
- The Animals coming out of the Ark; after Raphael.
- Moses showing the Tables of the Law; after the same.
- The Miracle of the Loaves; after the same.
- Christ appearing to St. Peter; after the same.
- The Battle of Constantino with Maxentius; after the same.
- The Murder of the Innocents; after the same.
- Susannah and the Elders; after Titian. 1586.
- St. John preaching in the Wilderness: after A. del Sarto.
- The Descent from the Cross; after Daniele da Volterra.
- The Virgin and Infant in the Clouds; after Livio Agresti.
- The Elevation of the Cross; after the same.

== Sources ==
- Witcombe, Christopher L. C. E., 2004: Copyright in the Renaissance: Prints and the Privilegio in Sixteenth-Century Venice and Rome. No. 100, Studies in Medieval and Reformation Traditions
