= Bentresh stela =

Ancient Egyptian sandstone stela with a hieroglyphic text telling the story of Bentresh

Bentresh Stela
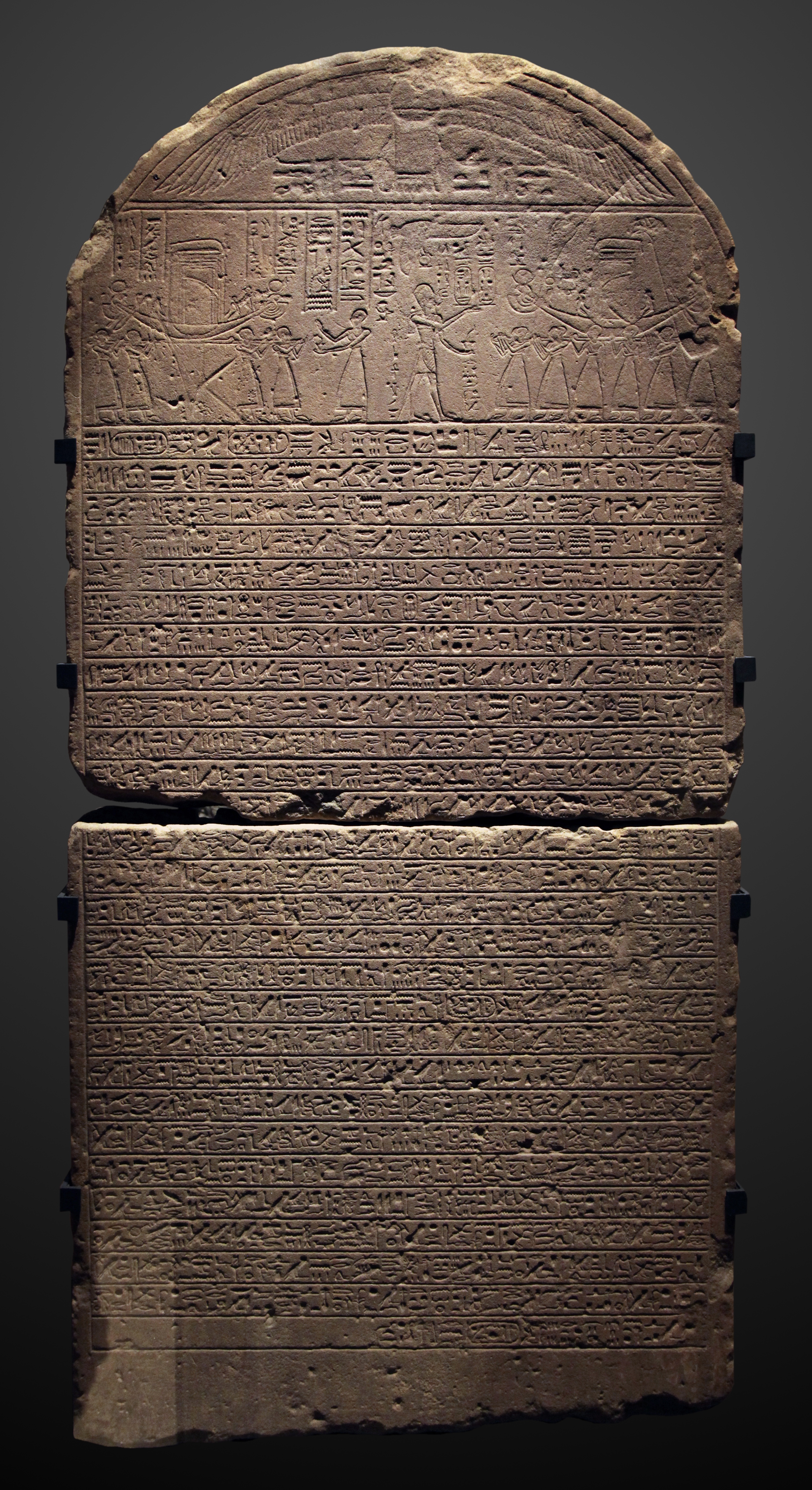
- Material: Sandstone
- Height: 222 cm
- Width: 109 cm
- Writing: Egyptian hieroglyphs
- Created: c. 525 BCE - 300 BCE
- Discovered: Temple of Khonsu (1829)
- Present location: Louvre
- Identification: C 284

The Bentresh Stela or Bakhtan Stela is an ancient Egyptian sandstone stela with a hieroglyphic text telling the story of Bentresh, daughter of the prince of Bakhtan (possibly Bactria or more likely a corruption of the land of the Hittites), who fell ill and was healed by the Egyptian god Khonsu.

== Dating ==
The narrative is set during the reign of Ramesses II (Bentresh is his sister-in-law in the story), but the text is commonly regarded as pseudo-epigraphical; despite being carefully composed and carved in the New Kingdom fashion, the text itself betrays a much later execution.
Adolf Erman suggested an early Ptolemaic datation for the stela, an opinion shared by Kim Ryholt; others scholars instead interpreted the text as anti-Persian propaganda and dated the stela to the 27th Dynasty (reigned 525 –404 BC).

== Purpose ==
Its purpose might have been to reminisce on Egypt's old glory during foreign Persian or Ptolemaic rule, or to glorify Khonsu-Neferhotep, "the merciful" and Khonsu-Pairsekher, "the provider", the two aspects of the god worshiped in Thebes, or was inspired by the rivalry of their respective priesthoods.

The alleged marriage between Ramesses II and the daughter of the prince of Bactria has recently been interpreted as an example of imitatio alexandri, i.e. the imitation of Alexander the Great. However, the reading of Bakhtan may be a corruption of the Egyptian hieroglyphs for the Hatti-Land.. If so, the legend perhaps more closely reflects Ramessid interactions with the Hittites and the "continuity of the fame of Ramesses II and his high deeds in later popular tradition."

== Description ==
The stela is made of black sandstone; its proportions are 222×109 cm. It was found in 1829 in a small Ptolemaic shrine that stood next to the Khonsu temple of Ramesses III in Karnak. It is now in the Louvre (Louvre C 284).

=== Lunette ===
The lunette shows Ramesses II giving incense offerings to Khonsu of Thebes.

=== Text ===
The text consists of 28 lines, begins with the titles of Ramesses, then recounts the story: When His Majesty traveled to Naharin, the Prince of Bakhtan gave him his eldest daughter in marriage. The pharaoh named the girl Neferure (she was possibly modeled on Ramesses' foreign Great Royal Wife Maathorneferure) and made her his queen. In the 23rd regnal year the Pharaoh received news that Neferure's younger sister Bentresh became ill. Ramesses sent her the wise scribe Djehutyemheb to heal her, but he didn't succeed, because the girl was seized by a demon. The Prince of Bakhtan asked the Pharaoh to send a god. Ramesses asked the help of Khonsu-Neferhotep who gave his magical protection to Khonsu-Pairsekher, whose statue was then dispatched to Bakhtan. The god expelled the demon and healed the princess. The Prince of Bakhtan failed to send the god back to Egypt, thus Khonsu spent 3 years and 9 months in Bakhtan, but one night the Prince saw a dream: the god changed into a golden falcon, left his shrine and flew back to Egypt. The Prince understood that he had to let the god go, and ordered the statue to be taken back to Egypt.

The story of Bentresh has been suggested to have inspired the Christian Legend of Hilaria. There are, however, major differences between the two stories.

== Literature ==
- Michèle Broze: La Princesse de Bakhtan. Essai d'analyse stylistique. Monographies Reine Élisabeth, Bruxelles 1989.
- Günter Burkard: Medizin und Politik: Altägyptische Heilkunst am persischen Königshof. In: SAK 21, 1994, S. 35–55 (insb. S. 47–55).
- Jean-François Champollion: Monuments de l'Égypte et de la Nubie. Notices descriptives conforme aux manuscrits autographes, rédigés sur les lieux. Band II, Paris 1844, S. 280–290.
- Marc Coenen: A propos de la stèle de Bakhtan. In: Göttinger Miszellen (GM) 142, 1994, S. 57–59.
- D. Devauchelle: Fragments de décrets ptolémaïques en langue égyptienne conservés au Musée du Louvre. In: RdE 37, 1986, 149 f.
- Sergio Donadoni: Per la data della Stele di Bentres. In: MDIK 15, 1957.
- Frank Kammerzell: Ein ägyptischer Gott reist nach Bachatna, um die von einem Dämonen besessene Prinzessin Bintrischji zu heilen (Bentresch-Stele). In: Texte aus der Umwelt des Alten Testaments. Band III: Weisheitstexte, Mythen und Epen. Mythen und Epen III. S. 955–969.
- Hugo Greßmann: Altorientalische Texte zum Alten Testament. 1926, S. 77–79.
- Kenneth Anderson Kitchen: Ramesside Inscriptions. Historical and Biographical, Band II. Oxford 1979, S. 284–287.
- Scott N. Morschauser: Using History: Reflections on the Bentresh Stela. In: Studien für Altägyptische Kultur (SAK) 15, 1988, S. 203–223.
- Georges Posener: A propos de la stèle de Bentresh. In: Bulletin de l'Institut français d'archéologie orientale (BIFAO) 34, 1934, S. 75–81.
- Joachim Friedrich Quack: Importing and Exporting Gods? On the Flow of Deities between Egypt and its Neighboring Countries. In: A. Flüchter, J. Schöttli (Ed.), The Dynamics of Transculturality. Concepts and Institutions in Motion (Cham, Heidelberg, New York, Dordrecht, London 2015), S. 255-277.
- Wilhelm Spiegelberg: Zu der Datierung der Bentresch-Stele. In: Recueil de travaux relatifs à la philologie et à l'archéologie égyptienne et assyrienne 28, 1906.
- Wolfhart Westendorf: Bentresch-Stele. In: Wolfgang Helck, Eberhard Otto: Lexikon der Ägyptologie, Band I, 1975, Sp. 698-700.
