= Inventory Stela =

Ancient Egyptian commemorative tablet

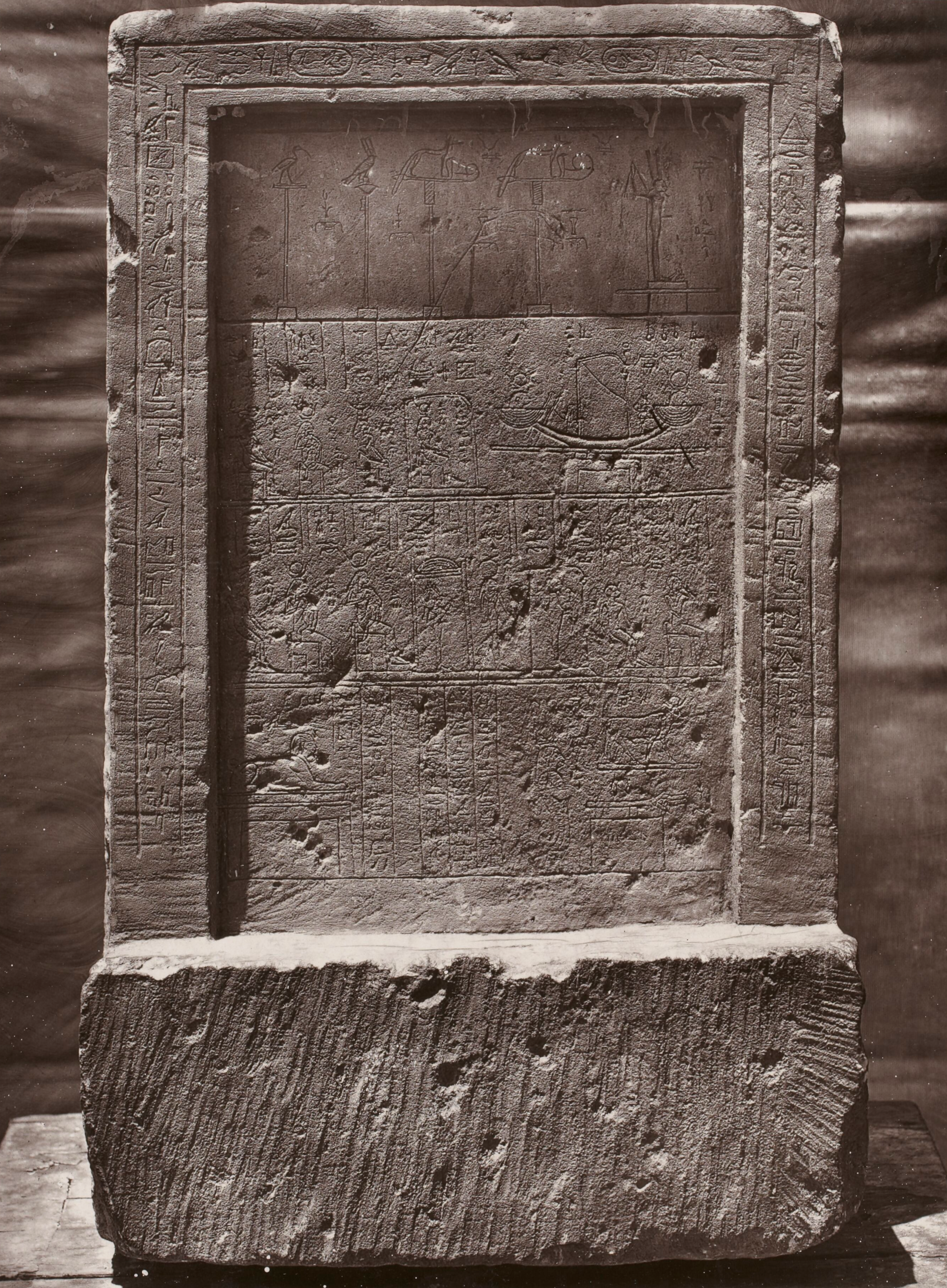
- Type: Stela
- Material: Limestone
- Height: 70 centimetres (28 in)
- Width: 42 centimetres (17 in)
- Writing: Egyptian hieroglyphs
- Period/culture: Saite Period
- Discovered: 1858; Giza Plateau, Egypt; 29.97786°N 31.13645°E
- Discovered by: Auguste Mariette
- Present location: Egyptian Museum
- Registration: JE 2091

The Inventory Stela, also known as the Stela of Khufu's Daughter, is an ancient Egyptian commemorative tablet dating back to the 26th Dynasty (circa 670 BC). It was discovered in Giza during the 19th century. The stela lists 22 divine statues belonging to a Temple of Isis and asserts that the temple existed long before the reign of Khufu (circa 2580 BC).

== Discovery ==
The stela was discovered in 1858 at Giza by the French archaeologist Auguste Mariette, during excavations of the Isis temple, next to queen's pyramid G1-c. The tablet was found close to the Great Sphinx of Giza.

== Description ==
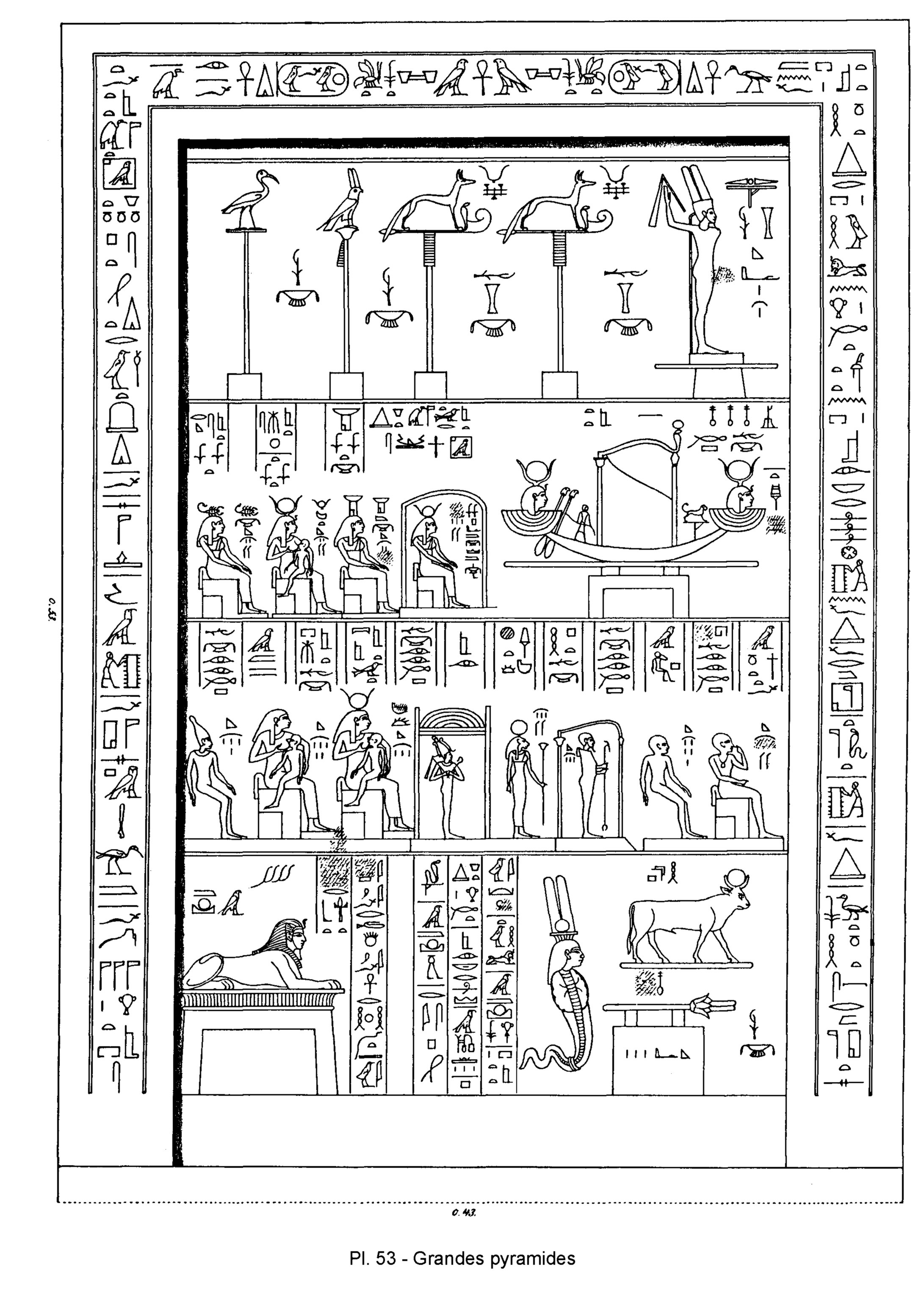
Inscriptions on the Inventory Stela

The original size of the tablet is unknown, since it was already damaged at the time of its discovery. The creation of the stela can be dated back to the 26th Dynasty, the Saite period, around 670 BC. The Inventory Stela is made of limestone and decorated with a commemorative inscription and a so-called apparition window. The apparition window names 22 divine statues of different deities, the statues are claimed to have been part of the temple's belongings. The statues are figuratively depicted and their material and size are also described.

The commemorative text is engraved on the U-shaped frame around the apparition window. It praises the gods Isis, Mistress of the pyramids and Osiris, Lord of Rosta. After this, the inscription claims that the Isis temple was already at its place before the pyramids had been erected and that the temple was discovered by Khufu east of the Great Pyramid, beside the "house of Harmakhis" (the Sphinx). Then it claims that Khufu first "built the temple of Isis anew" and then built a pyramid for the "king's daughter Henutsen". Finally, the goddess Isis is praised and again entitled as "mistress of the pyramids".

== Historical importance ==
The credibility of the Inventory Stela is viewed by historians and Egyptologists with great caution. The text contains many anachronisms and its elaboration is poor. It is likely the text on the stela, which says the Temple of Isis was older than the pyramids, was fabricated by temple priests in order to give the temple a false but important history. Such an act became common when religious institutions such as temples, shrines and priests' domains where fighting for political attention and for financial and economic donations.

The Isis temple was built on the remains of the mortuary temple of queen's pyramid G1-c, which is today believed to be queen Henutsen's tomb. Already in ruins at the end of the Middle Kingdom, the mortuary temple was first rebuilt and enlarged in the Eighteenth Dynasty. Further reconstruction took place in the Twenty-first and Twenty-sixth Dynasty, when it served as a place of worship for the cult of Isis, Mistress of the Pyramid.

A first, direct proof for fakery is the circumstance that Khufu is introduced by his Horus name first, not by his birth name inside a cartouche, as was actually common at the time the stela was erected. Secondly, it mentions the goddess Isis. But Isis' name does not verifiably occur before king (pharaoh) Nyuser-Rê of the 5th Dynasty and she never had the title "mistress of the pyramid(s)". Lastly, Henutsen was a queen consort. Her actual parents are unknown and she is not known to be the daughter of a king.

Despite these scholarly conclusions, psuedoarchaeologists who believe the Sphinx and Pyramids are older than they are generally thought, consider the stela as proof supporting such claims.
