= Annals of Thutmose III =

The Annals of Thutmose III are composed of numerous inscriptions of ancient Egyptian military records gathered from the 18th Dynasty campaigns of Thutmose III's armies in Syro-Palestine, from regnal years 22 (1458 BCE) to 42 (1438 BCE). These recordings can be found on the inside walls of the chamber housing the "holy of holies" at the great Karnak Temple of Amun. Measuring just 25 meters in length and 12 meters wide, the space containing these inscriptions presents the largest and most detailed accounts concerning military exploits of all Egyptian kings.

The most detailed and extravagant inscription on the wall at Karnak describes the first campaign, in year 23, of Thutmose III, which was the Battle of Megiddo. Before his death, Thutmose III would partake in a total of seventeen campaigns. The remainder of Thutmose III's campaign inscriptions contain only brief information and one can clearly see a difference in their descriptive styles. While the Megiddo campaign focuses heavily on details, the other campaign inscriptions seem to focus on the prizes of war. As the years of Thutmose III's reign pass, the inscriptions on the wall at Karnak become less descriptive.

While the Annals of Thutmose III help researchers to piece together ancient Egypt's past, Spalinger makes a good point in examining the literary aspects of the inscriptions as well as the historical aspects. As the years of Thutmose III's reign progress for example, Spalinger describes the less descriptive, list-like inscriptions as society becoming more organized. Using this less historical approach, he describes how a constant flow of war loot and foodstuffs most likely played a part in seemingly missing segments. These inscriptions could not be seen by the general public because of their placement in the Karnak Temple of Amun.

== Bibliography ==
- Breasted, James H. (1906). Ancient Records of Egypt: The eighteenth dynasty. Chicago: The University of Chicago Press.
- Redford, Donald B. (2003). The Wars in Syria and Palestine of Thutmose III. Culture and history of the ancient Near East. Vol. 16. Netherlands: Brill.
- Spalinger, Anthony (1977). "A Critical Analysis of the 'Annals' of Thutmose III (Stücke V-VI)". Journal of the American Research Center in Egypt. 14: 41–54. JSTOR 40000366.
- Spalinger, Anthony (January 1978). "A New Reference to an Egyptian Campaign of Thutmose III in Asia". Journal of Near Eastern Studies. 37 (1): 35–41. JSTOR 544293.
- Wente, Edward F. (October 1975). "Thutmose III's Accession and the Beginning of the New Kingdom". Journal of Near Eastern Studies. 34 (4): 265–272. JSTOR 544149.
